= Select Committee on the Taxation of Gas Resources =

Select committee of the Australian Senate

- 48th Parliament of Australia

Type
- Type: Select committee of the Australian Senate

History
- Founded: 30 March 2026

Leadership
- Chair: Steph Hodgins-May, Greens
- Deputy Chair: Varun Ghosh, Labor

Structure
- Seats: 6
- Political groups: Government (2): Labor (2); Opposition (2): Liberal (1); Liberal National (1); Crossbench (2): Independent (1); Greens (1)

Meeting place
- Parliament House; Canberra, Australian Capital Territory; Australia

Website
- Select Committee on the Taxation of Gas Resources

Rules
- Standing Orders of the House of Representatives

The Select Committee on the Taxation of Gas Resources was a select committee of the Australian senate, tabled on 7 May 2026. It was established to investigate the tax treatment of Australian oil and gas, among other issues related to gas taxation. The committee consisted of 6 members, and 5 participating members and 6 secretariats.

== Background ==
A movement advocating for a significant increase in taxes of Australia's liquefied natural gas to a 25% tax levy on export revenue had garnered significant support online before the establishment of the committee. This followed The Australia Institute report that Australia raises more money from beer excise than it does from the Petroleum Resource Rent Tax. Independent Senator David Pocock received almost 10 million views on Instagram in campaigning for the gas tax, and the movement was supported by conservative billionaire Clive Palmer, the Greens, a progressive political party, among others.

== Members ==
Member	Party	State
Steph Hodgins-May Chair	Greens	Victoria
Varun Ghosh Deputy Chair	Labor	Western Australia
Lisa Darmanin	Labor	Victoria
Susan McDonald	Liberal National	Queensland
David Pocock	Independent	Australian Capital Territory
Dean Smith	Liberal	Western Australia

=== Participating members ===
Member	Party	State
Sarah Hanson-Young	Greens	South Australia
Fatima Payman	Australia's Voice	Western Australia
Andrew McLachlan	Liberal	South Australia
Larissa Waters	Greens	Queensland
Peter Whish-Wilson	Greens	Tasmania

=== Hearings ===
Organisation	Person	Role
21 April, 2026
The Australia Institute	Richard Denniss	Executive Director
Punter's Politics	Konrad Benjamin	Founder
Institute for Energy Economics and Financial Analysis	Joshua Runciman	Lead Australian Gas Analyst
Australian Council of Social Service	Kellie Caught	Program Director for Climate and Energy
Australian Council of Social Service	Peter Davidson	Principal Advisor
The Superpower Institute	Baethan Mullen	Chief Executive Officer
Centre for Policy Development	Toby Phillips	Economic Director
Centre for Policy Development	Miles Prosser	Energy Transition Lead
Climate Council of Australia	Greg Bourne	Councillor
Australian Conservation Foundation	Adam Bandt	Chief Executive Officer
Australian Conservation Foundation	Annika Reynolds	Head of Climate Policy
Greenpeace Australia Pacific	Joe Rafalowicz	Head of Climate and Energy
Labor Environment Action Network	Janaline Oh	National Secretary
Future Group	Christina Hobbs	Policy and Advocacy Manager
Private capacity	Ken Henry	—N/a
Private capacity	Ketan Joshi	—N/a
22 April, 2026
Queensland Resources Council	Janette Hewson	Chief Executive Officer
Queensland Resources Council	Jana Dore	Policy Director External Affairs and Policy Director Economics
Shell Australia	Celia Wake	Country Chair and EVP Integrated Gas Australia
Shell Australia	Coralie Trotter	Head of Tax Asia Pacific and Middle East
Business Council of Australia	Bran Black	Chief Executive Officer
Business Council of Australia	Steven Wright	Director of Energy and Climate Change
ConocoPhillips	James Matthews	General Manager of Government Affairs
ConocoPhillips	Natalie Wallach	Head of Tax & Governance
Origin Energy	Tim O'Grady	General Manager of Government Engagement
Origin Energy	Catherine Feng	Head of Tax
Tax Justice Network – Australia	Mark Zirnsak	Spokesperson
Centre for International Corporate Tax Accountability and Research	Jason Ward	Principal Analyst
Treasury	Marty Robinson	First Assistant Secretary
Treasury	Susan Bultitude	Assistant Secretary
Treasury	Freya Carlton	Assistant Secretary for Domestic Demand, International and Trade Branch
Australian Taxation Office	Michelle Sams	Deputy Commissioner on Public Groups Engagement
Australian Taxation Office	Suzie Emery	Assistant Commissioner on Public Groups Engagement
Australian Taxation Office	Rhys Manley	Assistant Commissioner on Policy, Analysis and Legislation
Australian Competition and Consumer Commission	Anna Brakey	Commissioner
Australian Competition and Consumer Commission	Angela Woo	General Manager for Gas Markets Branch
Australian Competition and Consumer Commission	Wallace Starl	Director for Gas Markets Branch
Department of Industry, Science and Resources	Sam Chard	Head of Oil and Gas Division
Department of Industry, Science and Resources	Norelle Laucher	General Manager of Offshore Strategy Branch
Department of Industry, Science and Resources	Crystal Ossolinski	General Manager, Resources and Energy Insights
Department of Climate Change, Energy, the Environment and Water	Linda McGrath	Head of National Energy Transformation Division
Department of Climate Change, Energy, the Environment and Water	Hew Atkin	Acting Head of Gas Markets Division
Department of Climate Change, Energy, the Environment and Water	Andrew Pankowski	Head of Gas Transformation Strategy Branch
24 April 2026
Centre for Mining, Energy and Natural Resources Law, University of Western Australia	John Chandler	Professor
Climate Analytics	Bill Hare	Chief Executive Officer
Climate Analytics	James Bowen	Climate & Energy Policy Analyst
Climate Analytics	Thomas Houlie	Climate & Energy Policy Analyst
Woodside Energy	Graham Tiver	Chief Financial Officer and Executive Vice President
Woodside Energy	Tony Cudmore	Executive Vice President in Sustainability, Policy and External Affairs
Chevron Australia	Maggie McCourt	General Manager of Finance
Kynan Scarr	General Manager of Asset Development	
Australian Energy Producers	Samantha McCulloch	Chief Executive Office
Australian Energy Producers	Matthew Steen	Principal Advisor - Economic Policy
INPEX Australia	Bill Townsend	Senior Vice President Corporate
INPEX Australia	Mike Gardiner	Vice President Finance, Treasury and Technology
INPEX Australia	Cameron McPhie	General Manager Decarbonisation
Conservation Council of Western Australia	Matt Roberts	Executive Director
Conservation Council of Western Australia	Liam Lilly	Research Coordinator
Conservation Council of Western Australia	Greta Carroll	Fossil Fuels Senior Campaigner
Chamber of Minerals and Energy of Western Australia	Aaron Morey	Chief Executive Officer
Chamber of Minerals and Energy of Western Australia	Steven Mills	Manager of Climate and Energy
Private Capacity	Bill Johnston	—N/a
Asia Natural Gas and Energy Australia	David Wawn	Senior Advisor
Santos Limited	Tracey Winters	Chief Strategy Officer

== Events ==
During the committee, former treasury secretary Ken Henry urged the government to implement the 25% levy tax.
