= Australian Senate committees =

The committees of the Australian Senate are committees of Senators, established by the Australian Senate, for purposes determined by that body. Senate committees are part of the operation of the Australian parliament, and have for some decades been involved in maintenance of government accountability to the Australian parliament, particularly through hearings to scrutinise the budget, and through public inquiries on policy questions.

== History of the committees ==
A short video on Australian Parliamentary Committees

The existence of parliamentary committees is mentioned in section 49 of the Constitution of Australia, which makes reference to 'The powers, privileges, and immunities of the Senate and of the House of Representatives, and of the members and the committees of each House...' However, the Senate had few committees, engaged in limited activities, until 1970. A number of domestic committees had operated since the establishment of the parliament, but prior to 1970 the only significant committee to be established was the Regulations and Ordinances Committee in 1932, one of the legislative scrutiny committees (see below).

In 1970, the present committee system was created, with a series of standing (permanent) committees established that mirrored the portfolio activities of government. These reforms significantly enhanced the expertise and power of the Senate:

The Senate is now undergoing the most fundamental and dramatic changes witnessed in the Commonwealth Parliament since the States decided to federate 70 years ago. The introduction of a wide-ranging committee system will make the red-carpeted Upper House potentially the most powerful parliamentary chamber in Australia.

These reforms were also significant in that they gave to Senate committees the role of examining the budget (what is referred to as the estimates process or estimates hearings), which had hitherto been confined to the Senate and its committee of the whole. The role of the committees was enhanced by three subsequent developments. First, in 1982 the Scrutiny of Bills Committee was established, which, in examining all bills, played a role that complemented that of the examination of all delegated legislation by the Regulations and Ordinances Committee. Second, in 1989 the Senate adopted procedures for the systematic referral of bills to committees, increasing the level of legislative scrutiny taking place within parliament. Third, in 1993, the committees adopted a more extensive procedure for consideration of the budget, creating a second opportunity each year for Senators to follow up issues identified during the initial budget estimates hearings. These second hearings are referred to as supplementary budget estimates. Though the committee system was restructured in 1994, 2006 and again in 2009, the range of functions has remained essentially the same.

== Purposes of committees ==
The functions of committees depend on the type of committee and on the work it is undertaking. Most of the committees are established under the Senate's Standing Orders.

=== Standing committees ===
The Legislative and General Purpose Standing Committees (often referred to simply as 'standing committees') are established by Standing Order 25. The standing committees are actually made up of pairs of committees – a legislation committee and a references committee. The legislation committees are responsible for scrutinising bills referred to them by the chamber; examining the government's budget and activities (in what is called the budget estimates process); and for examining departmental annual reports and activities. The references committees are responsible for conducting inquiries into topics referred to them by the chamber.

=== Select committees ===
Select committees are temporary committees, established by the Senate to deal with particular issues. This may occur when a particular group of Senators wishes to examine an issue in depth, or where there is no existing committee suited to addressing a particular topic. Australian Senate select committees have included ones set up to examine the Administration of Indigenous Affairs, and Mental Health. Select committees usually cease to exist upon reporting back to the chamber. One exception to this was the Senate Select Committee on Superannuation which in various forms existed for a decade.

=== Domestic committees ===
Domestic committees are responsible for administering aspects of the Senate's own affairs. The selection of bills committee meets each sitting fortnight to consider which of the bills coming before the Senate will be referred to committees for detailed consideration. The procedure committee considers "any matter relating to the procedures of the Senate referred to it by the Senate or by the President". This committee thus regularly examines and reports back to the chamber on suggested changes to the operation of the Senate and its committees, such as what times of day the chamber will sit and what rules should govern its order of business.

Established by Standing Order 18 of the Senate, the privileges committee is responsible for reporting on matters of parliamentary privilege referred to it by the Senate. The protections afforded by parliamentary privilege are essential to parliament and its committees to be able to operate effectively. The bulk of the work of the privileges committee's work is associated with facilitating a 'right of reply' for people adversely named in the Senate, as well as involving investigations of unauthorised disclosures of Senate committee proceedings, complaints from witnesses in connection with evidence given to committees, and allegedly misleading evidence given to committees.

=== Legislative scrutiny committees ===
The purpose of the scrutiny of bills committee is to assess "legislative proposals against a set of accountability standards that focus on the effect of proposed legislation on individual rights, liberties and obligations, and on parliamentary propriety". The Standing Committee for the Scrutiny of Delegated Legislation performs a similar task, but for all subordinate legislation.

=== Other committees ===
Senators may be members of joint committees: committees jointly established by both chambers of the Australian parliament. An example of this is the Joint Standing Committee on Northern Australia, appointed by resolution by the House of Representatives on 4 July 2019 and the Senate on 22 July 2019. The inquiry into the destruction of 46,000-year-old caves at the Juukan Gorge in the Pilbara region of Western Australia was referred to this Committee in June 2020.

Political parties will often have caucus committees comprising members of the parliamentary party; these committees will often have a policy focus, but are not committees of the parliament and are not bound by any of parliament's rules of procedures.

== List of committees ==
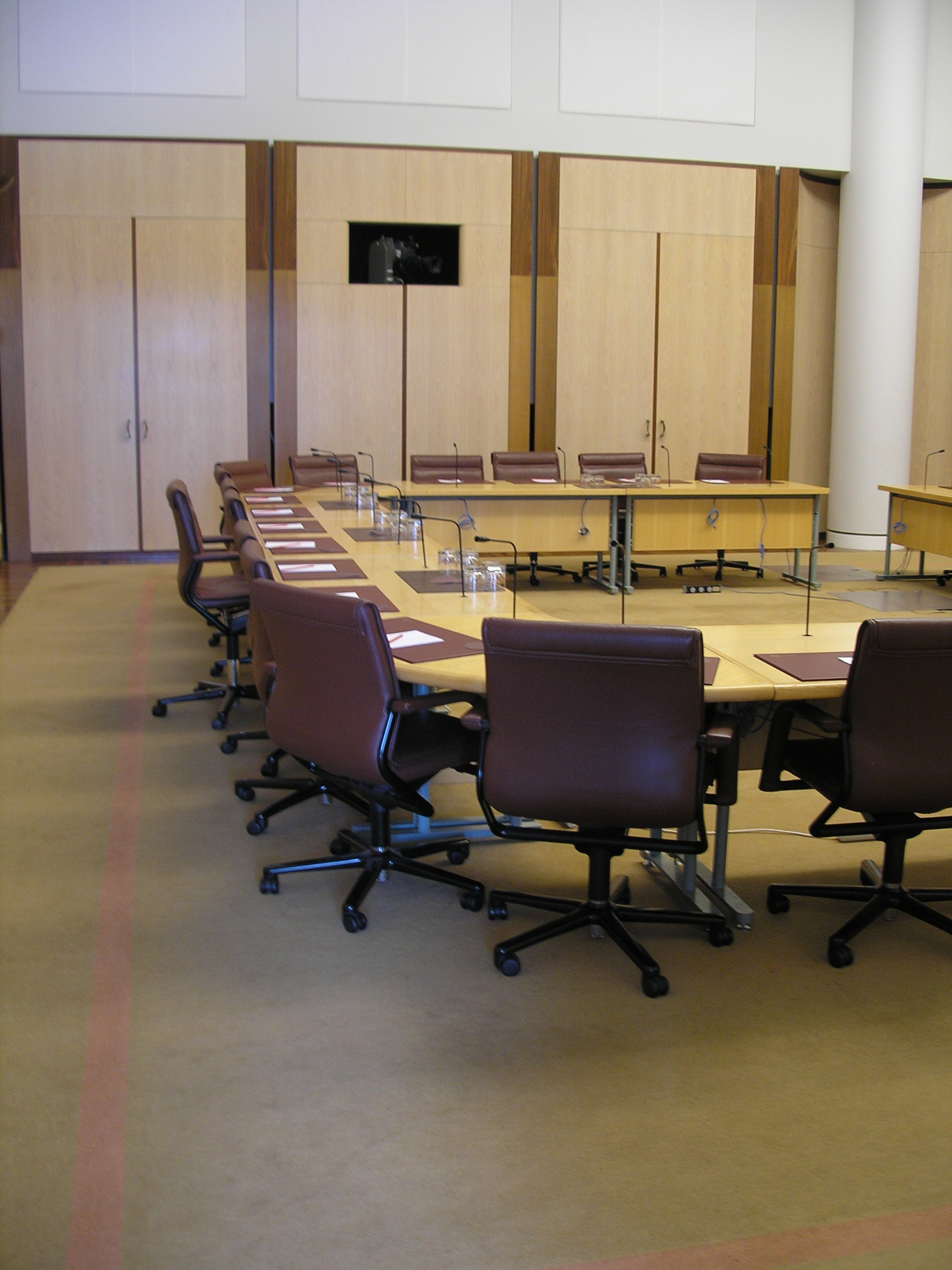
A Senate committee room in Parliament House, Canberra

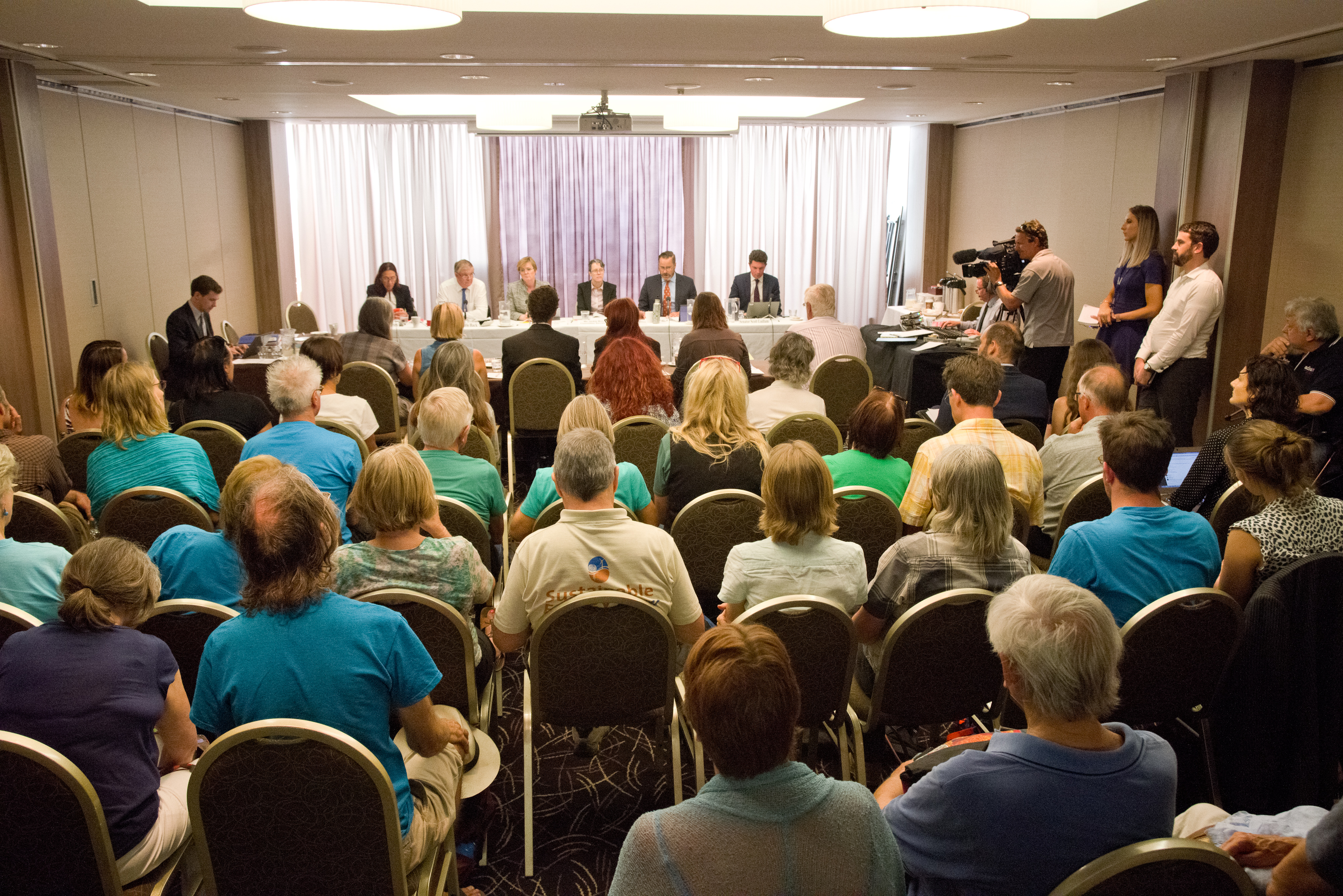
a public Senate Committee hearing into the Roe 8 environmental compliance held in Perth 23 March 2017

These are the committees of the 47th Parliament that exist within each category:

Committee	Chair	Deputy Chair
Standing committees
Community Affairs
Legislation	Marielle Smith (SA)	Janet Rice (VIC)
References	Janet Rice (VIC)	Marielle Smith (SA)
Economics
Legislation	Jess Walsh (VIC)	Andrew Bragg (NSW)
References	Andrew Bragg (NSW)	Jess Walsh (VIC)
Education and Employment
Legislation	Tony Sheldon (NSW)	Matt O'Sullivan (WA)
References	Matt O'Sullivan (WA)	Tony Sheldon (NSW)
Environment and Communications
Legislation	Karen Grogan (SA)	Sarah Hanson-Young (SA)
References	Sarah Hanson-Young (SA)	Karen Grogan (SA)
Finance and Public Administration
Legislation	Louise Pratt (WA)	Richard Colbeck (TAS)
References	Richard Colbeck (TAS)	Louise Pratt (WA)
Foreign Affairs, Defence and Trade
Legislation	Raff Ciccone (VIC)	Claire Chandler (TAS)
References	Claire Chandler (TAS)	Raff Ciccone (VIC)
Legal and Constitutional Affairs
Legislation	Nita Green (QLD)	Paul Scarr (QLD)
References	Paul Scarr (QLD)	Nita Green (QLD)
Rural and Regional Affairs and Transport
Legislation	Glenn Sterle (WA)	Matthew Canavan (QLD)
References	Matthew Canavan (QLD)	Glenn Sterle (WA)
Select committees
Australia’s Disaster Resilience	Jacqui Lambie (TAS)	Tony Sheldon (NSW)
Final Report due 8 August 2024		
Cost of Living	Jane Hume (VIC)	Penny Allman-Payne (QLD)
Final Report due 31 May 2024		
Perth Mint and Commonwealth regulatory compliance	Dean Smith (WA)	Dorinda Cox (WA)
Final Report due 28 March 2024		
Supermarket Prices	Nick McKim (TAS)	Glenn Sterle (WA)
Final Report due 7 May 2024		
Taxation of Gas Resources	Steph Hodgins-May (VIC)	Varun Ghosh (WA)
Final Report due 7 May 2026		
Domestic committees
Appropriations, Staffing and Security	Sue Lines (WA)	Andrew McLachlan (SA)
Privileges	Slade Brockman (WA)	Deborah O'Neill (NSW)
Procedure	Andrew McLachlan (SA)	
Publications	Fatima Payman (WA)	Wendy Askew (TAS)
Selection of Bills	Anne Urquhart (TAS)	
Senators' Interests	Linda Reynolds (WA)	
Legislative scrutiny committees
Scrutiny of Bills	Dean Smith (WA)	Raff Ciccone (VIC)
Scrutiny of Delegated Legislation	Vacant	Linda Reynolds (WA)
Joint Statutory Committees
Broadcasting of Parliamentary Proceedings	Milton Dick MP	Senator Sue Lines
Corporations and Financial Services	Senator Deborah O'Neill	Alex Hawke MP
Intelligence and Security	Peter Khalil MP	Andrew Wallace MP
Law Enforcement	Senator Helen Polley	Llew O'Brien MP
Human Rights	Josh Burns MP	Henry Pike MP
Public Accounts and Audit	Julian Hill MP	Senator Linda Reynolds
Public Works	Graham Perrett MP	Keith Pitt MP
Joint Standing Committees
Aboriginal and Torres Strait Islander Affairs	Senator Jana Stewart	Melissa Price MP
Electoral Matters	Kate Thwaites MP	Senator James McGrath
Foreign Affairs, Defence and Trade	Shayne Neumann MP	Senator David Fawcett
Implementation of the National Redress Scheme	Senator Catryna Bilyk	Senator Dean Smith
Migration	Maria Vamvakinou MP	Anne Webster MP
National Anti-Corruption Commission	Senator Karen Grogan	Helen Haines MP
National Capital and External Territories	Alicia Payne MP	Nola Marino MP
National Disability Insurance Scheme	Libby Coker MP	Senator Hollie Hughes
Northern Australia	Marion Scrymgour MP	Warren Entsch MP
Parliamentary Library	Senator Slade Brockman	Anne Stanley MP
Publications	Fiona Phillips MP	Senator Fatima Payman
Trade and Investment Growth	Steve Georganas MP	Scott Buchholz MP
Treaties	Josh Wilson MP	Phillip Thompson MP

== Membership and rules of committees ==
The Senate's committees are formed at the commencement of each new parliament, in accordance with rules set out in the Standing Orders. The committees exist until the first day of the following parliament, in contrast to the lower house committees, which cease to exist as soon as parliament is prorogued for an election.

The most important and high profile of the committees are the pairs of standing committees. These each have six members. The chairman of each legislation committee is chosen from amongst the government members, the deputy chair from amongst non-government members. The reverse is the case for the references committees. Because the chair has a casting vote in the event of a committee vote being tied, the government effectively controls the legislation committees, while the non-government parties control the references committees.

The membership and rules of committees, including those that operated during the Coalition's period of control, are shown below:

Feature of committees	Current (and before September 2006)	Between September 2006 and May 2009
Structure of committees	Eight pairs of committees with overlapping but distinct membership: Legislation committees examined bills, budget estimates and annual reports; References committees examined references made by Senate	Eight Legislation and General Purpose Standing committees performing all functions of both Legislation and References committees
Scope of each committee	Varies: between 1 and 3 government portfolios	
Number of members	Six	Eight
Composition	Legislation committees: 3 government 2 opposition 1 minor party; References committees: 3 opposition 2 government 1 minor party	All Legislation and General Purpose Standing committees: 4 government 3 opposition 1 minor party
Chairing	Legislation committees: government chair; References committees: opposition chair (six committees); minor party chair (two committees)	All chaired by government members
Voting	Chair has a casting vote if votes tied	
Effective control	Legislation committees: government parties; References committees: non-government parties	Government parties
Quorum	1 government, 1 opposition OR; Majority of members	

Committees have two types of members: full members and participating members. In the case of standing committees, full members are the six outlined above. In addition, however, any Senator may arrange for the Senate to agree to their being made a participating member of the committee. This gives them the same rights as full members, with the important exception of being unable to vote on motions in private meetings of the committees.

The committees are governed by the Standing Orders of the Senate, as well as being able to pass their own resolutions to govern certain aspects of their operations (such as the processing of correspondence and submissions to inquiries).

Committees are designed to assist the Senate as a whole. Thus the main formal structure of their work is that the Senate refers something to a committee for examination, and the committee reports back to the Senate on that matter. These reports are tabled during parliamentary sittings, but can also be presented when the Senate is not in session. Committees can gather evidence and will often hold public hearings to assist this process. To gather their evidence committees can (with exceptions) travel from place to place to hear evidence. Committees are able to order the production of documents and the appearance of witnesses (powers that are in practice used very sparingly). Most evidence taken by committees (both written submissions and transcripts of public hearings) is published, however committees have the power to take evidence confidentially (in camera), and regularly do so. Committees hold both public hearings and conduct business at private meetings. The minutes of private meetings are confidential (in contrast, for example, to those of New South Wales parliamentary committees).

The rules governing committees are slightly different when conducting budget estimates hearings. In particular, during estimates hearings,

- any Senator may ask questions of the officials appearing before the committee (normally only members can ask questions)
- no evidence can be taken on a confidential basis (normally this is an option available to a committee)
- under Standing Orders, Senators may direct questions to any government agency, but only within the portfolio areas for which the committee has oversight. The committee cannot restrict the agencies to which Senators may direct questions (although the committee can control whether this happens at the public hearing, or whether it must be done in writing afterwards).

== The work of Senate committees ==
A typical year in the life of a Senate legislation committee will see it conduct eight days of hearings around budget estimates, in three sessions: February (additional estimates), May/June (the main budget estimates) and October/November (supplementary budget estimates). In addition, it will typically conduct several inquiries into pieces of legislation being considered by the parliament. A references committee will conduct inquiries into policy issues referred to it by the Senate. Each of these inquiries will usually result in a report tabled in the Senate (there may be exceptions if an election intervenes during the committee's deliberations). A consolidated list of the reports prepared by all Senate committees since 1970 is published by the Department of the Senate.

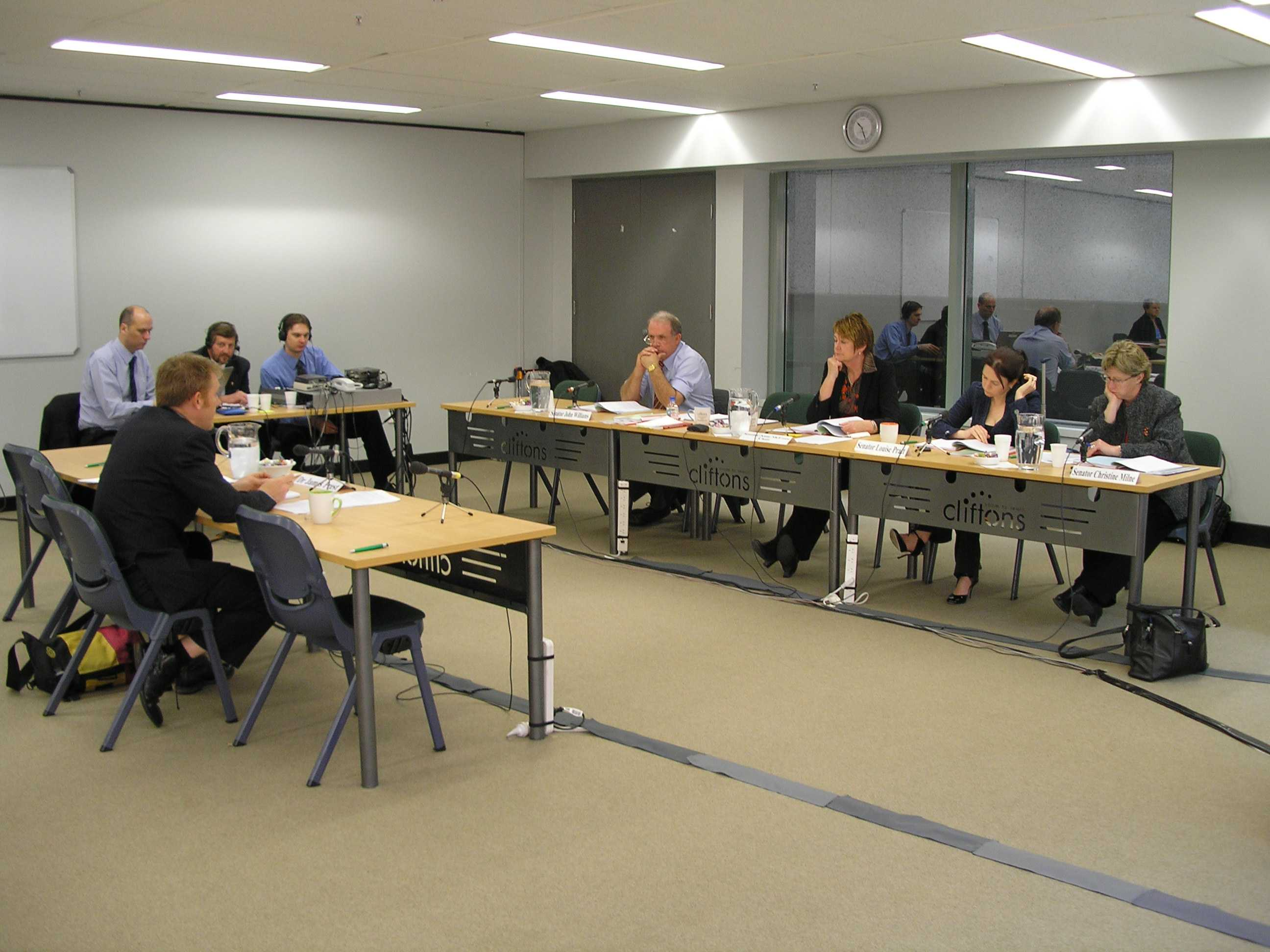
A Senate committee hearing, showing witness (left), transcription and broadcasting staff (back) and Senators (right)

=== Inquiries into topics and bills ===
Committee inquiries typically begin with the reference of an issue or a proposed law to the committee for inquiry and report back to the Senate. The committee will make a call for submissions, seeking public input on the matter referred to the committee. It will often publish those submissions to help inform stakeholders of the views that are being put to the committee. A committee will often hold one or more public hearings, at which committee members ask questions of key stakeholders interested in the issue under inquiry. These hearings may be held anywhere in Australia, are often broadcast, and result in a published transcript (Hansard) that records the evidence taken. The opportunity to make submissions, and the greater accessibility of the committees compared to parliament itself, can provide disadvantaged individuals and organisations valued opportunities to engage in democratic processes. Committees also frequently ask relevant government agencies to respond to issues raised by submissions or evidence given to the inquiry. Once evidence has been gathered there usually follows a period of research and analysis by the committee. It will then deliver a report to the Senate, which will generally include recommendations. The Commonwealth government is then expected to table a response to the report, stating responses to any recommendations the committee may have made.

=== Scrutiny of the budget ===
Following the introduction of appropriation bills into the Parliament, the expenditure proposed in those bills is referred to Senate legislation committees for inquiry. Such referrals result in what are generally known as budget estimates hearings. Senate standing committees will usually conduct eight days of hearings around budget estimates, in three sessions: February (additional estimates), May/June (the main budget estimates) and October/November (supplementary budget estimates).

During these hearings ministers, assisted by senior public servants, answer questions put to them by any Senator that relate to the operations and expenditure of departments and agencies that receive federal government funding. In such hearings, ministers from the House of Representatives are represented by a minister who is also a Senator.

Budget and management reforms in the 1980s and 1990s saw a change in budgeting, including a greater emphasis on outcomes, and decreasing emphasis on inputs. This has been reflected in the activities of Senate committees, with Senators' questions being increasingly focussed on the 'results of government activities and away from a concern with inputs'.

== Impact ==
The impact of the Senate's committees varies and has been the subject of debate. The work of the committees is frequently more consensual and less partisan than activity in the parliamentary chambers, and unanimous committee reports that agree recommendations across party lines are not uncommon. As a result, these recommendations may contribute to subsequent government policy announcements and occasionally to changes in government actions. The work of the regulations and ordinances committee has led to revisions of subordinate legislation in significant respects. Committee scrutiny of bills has contributed to them being amended or withdrawn. The impact of committees on legislation overall has however been described as 'rather limited', particularly as the committees that review bills are controlled by a government majority.

Senate committees can be affected by the party composition of the Senate. The Clerk of the Senate, Harry Evans, argued that a government majority of seats in the Senate resulted in limitations on what the committees inquired into, and how readily governments responded to their queries and requests for information. Statistics published by centrist political party the Australian Democrats have been used to support the contention that committee operations have been inhibited by government control of the Senate, particularly in respect of selection of topics for committee inquiry. However Senator Minchin, the leader of the government in the Senate in the mid-2000s, pointed out that their political rivals had previously cut off debate on more bills in the Senate than had his government.

=== Prominent inquiries ===
One of the most high-profile Senate committee inquiries was the Senate Select Committee on a Certain Maritime Incident, which in 2002 investigated what became known as the Children Overboard Affair. The events and subsequent Senate committee inquiries were widely reported, and the transcripts of the inquiry formed the basis of a play, A Certain Maritime Incident. Other high-profile inquiries included the Community Affairs committee's inquiry into Children in Institutional Care, which brought to wide public notice the experiences of children who had been placed in care in sometimes inhumane circumstances and was directly responsible for state governments and churches making public apologies to the victims of abuse or neglect; the Select Committee on Mental Health, which contributed to widespread discussion of mental health issues and to a major funding boost for services in 2006; and the 2006 inquiry into the Migration Amendment (Designated Unauthorised Arrivals) Bill, which contributed to a government decision not to proceed with controversial migration legislation.

== See also ==
- Australian House of Representatives committees
