= Punt =

Punt or punting may refer to:

== Boats ==
- Punt (boat), a flat-bottomed boat with a square-cut bow developed on the River Thames
- Falmouth Quay Punt, a small sailing vessel hired by ships anchored in Falmouth harbour
- Norfolk Punt, a type of racing dinghy developed in Norfolk
- Cable ferry, known as a punt in Australian English

== Places ==
- Land of Punt, a trading partner of Ancient Egypt, considered by many scholars to be in the Horn of Africa
- Puntland, a region in northeastern Somalia, centered on Garowe in the Nugaal province

== Sports and recreation ==
- Punt (gridiron football), a way of kicking a ball in the American or Canadian varieties of football
- Punt (Australian football), a way of kicking a ball in the Australian variety of football
- A type of goalkeeper kick in association football

== Other uses ==
- Punt (surname), a surname
- Punt, Punt Éireannach or Irish pound, pre-euro currency
- El Punt, a Catalan newspaper
- Punt gun, a type of extremely large shotgun, mounted directly on punt boats
- A punt or punty, a tool used in glassblowing
- A punt mark or pontil mark, left by the glassblowing tool
- Punt (wine bottle), the indented bottom of a wine bottle
- Punt, a colloquial term in British English for bet or wager in gambling
- PUNT, the Spanish acronym of the United National Workers' Party, a former political party in Equatorial Guinea

== See also ==
- Punter (disambiguation)
- Pundt
