= Parliament of Australia =

Federal bicameral legislature of Australia

Coordinates: 35°18′25″S 149°07′32″E

- 48th Parliament of Australia
- Commonwealth Coat of Arms

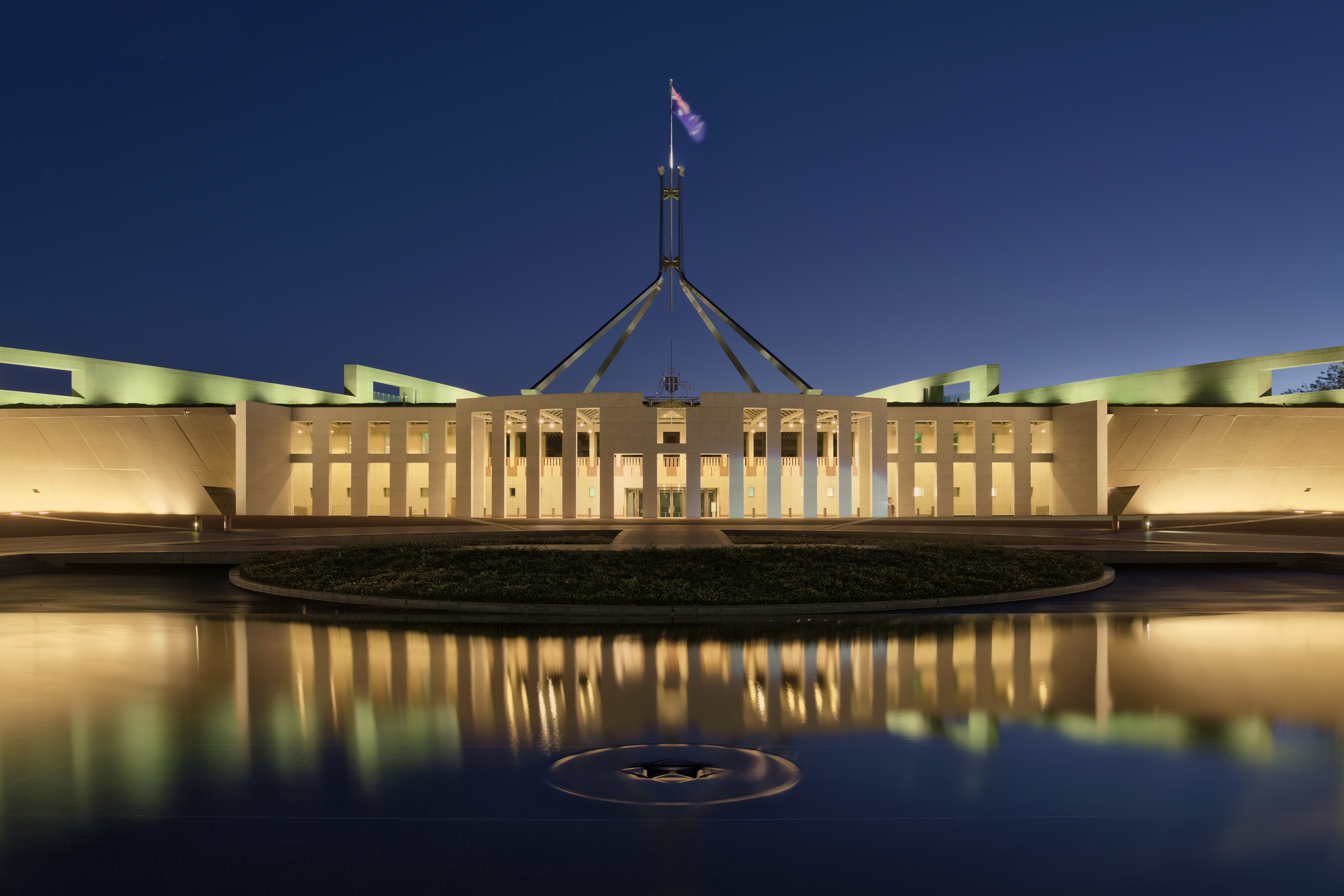
- Parliament House; Canberra, Australian Capital Territory

Type
- Type: Bicameral
- Houses: Senate; House of Representatives

History
- Founded: 1 January 1901; 125 years ago

Leadership
- Monarch: Charles III
- Governor-General: Sam Mostyn since 1 July 2024
- President of the Senate: Sue Lines, Labor since 26 July 2022
- Speaker of the House: Milton Dick, Labor since 26 July 2022
- Prime Minister: Anthony Albanese, Labor since 23 May 2022
- Leader of the Opposition: Angus Taylor, Liberal since 13 February 2026

Structure
- Seats: 226 (76 Senators, 150 MPs)
- House of Representatives political groups: Government (94): Labor (94); Opposition (41); Coalition: Liberal (27) (Note: Including 10 Liberal National Party of Queensland (LNP) MPs who sit in the Liberal party room); National (14) (Note: Including 6 Liberal National Party of Queensland (LNP) MPs who sit in the National party room); Crossbench (15): One Nation (2); Community Strong (2); Greens (1); Katter's Australian (1); Centre Alliance (1); Independent (8) (Note: Nicolette Boele (Bradfield, NSW); Kate Chaney (Curtin, WA); Andrew Gee (Calare, NSW); Helen Haines (Indi, Vic); Dai Le (Fowler, NSW); Monique Ryan (Kooyong, Vic); Sophie Scamps (Mackellar, NSW); Andrew Wilkie (Clark, TAS))
- Senate political groups: Government (30): Labor (30); Opposition (27); Coalition: Liberal (23) (Note: Including two Liberal National Party of Queensland (LNP) senators and one Country Liberal Party senator who sit in the Liberal party room.); National (4) (Note: Including two Liberal National Party of Queensland (LNP) senators who sit in the National party room.); Crossbench (19): Greens (10); One Nation (4); Lambie Network (1); United Australia (1); Australia's Voice (1); Independent (2) (Note: David Pocock (ACT); Lidia Thorpe (Vic))
- Length of term: House: 3 years (maximum); Senate: 6 years for state senators, 3 years for territory senators (fixed except under double dissolution)

Elections
- House of Representatives voting system: Full preferential voting
- Senate voting system: Single transferable vote (proportional representation)
- Last House of Representatives election: 3 May 2025
- Last Senate election: 3 May 2025 (half)
- Next House of Representatives election: On or before 23 September 2028
- Next Senate election: On or before 20 May 2028 (half)
- Redistricting: Redistributions at least every seven years by the Redistribution Committee

Meeting place
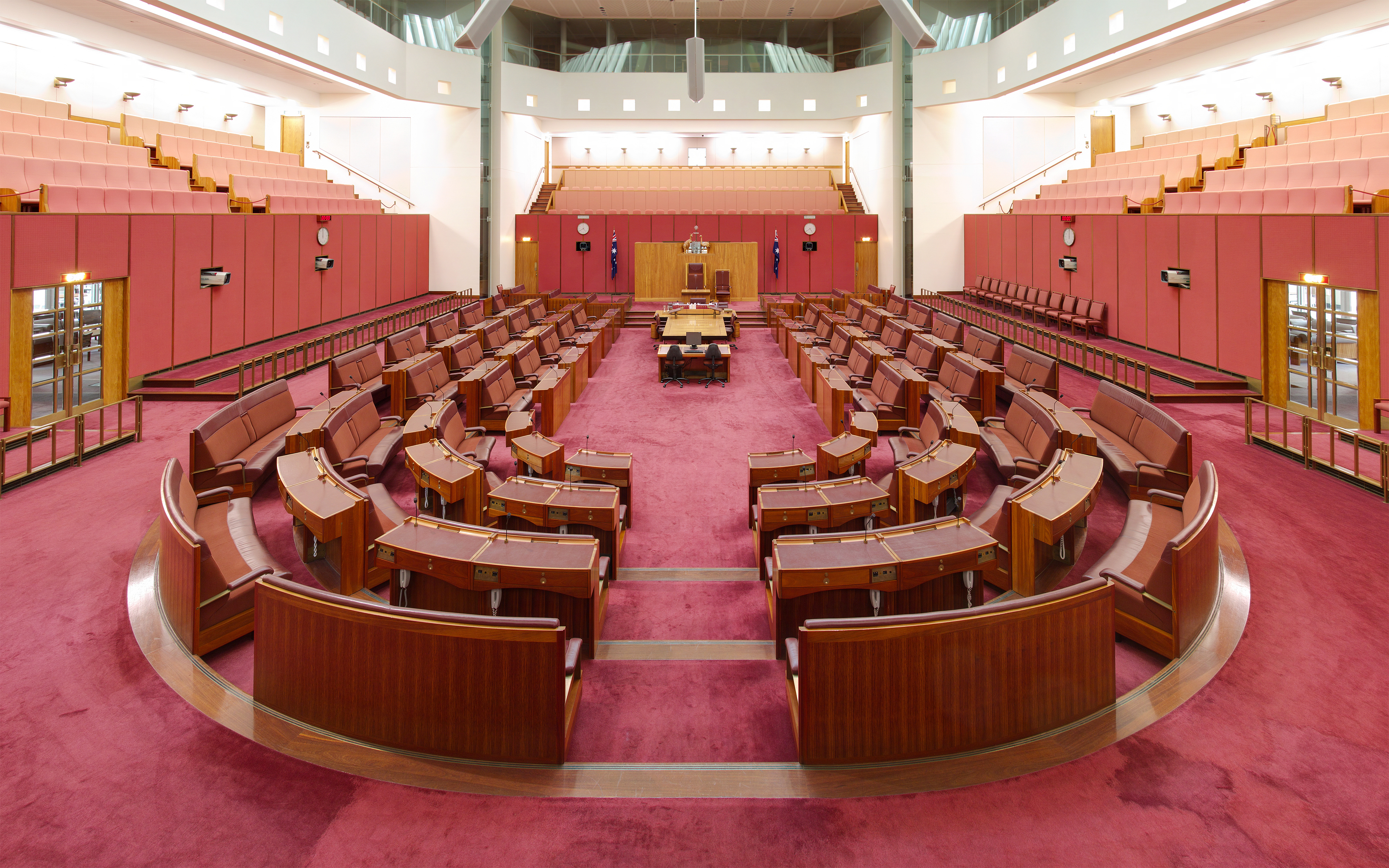
- Senate Chamber
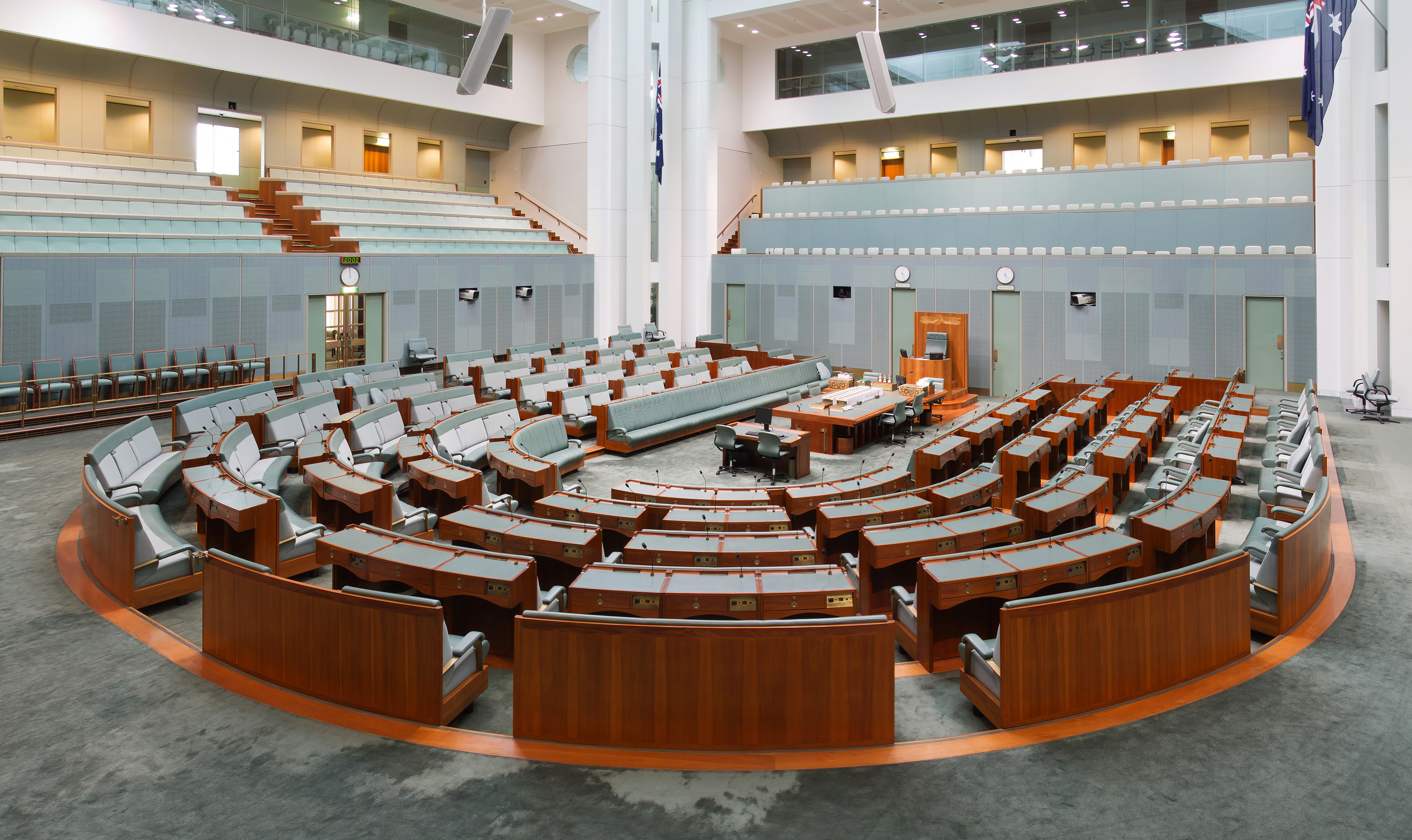
- House of Representatives Chamber

Website
- aph.gov.au

The Parliament of Australia (officially the Parliament of the Commonwealth and also known as the Federal Parliament) is the federal legislature of Australia. It consists of three elements: the monarch of Australia (represented by the governor-general), the Senate (the upper house), and the House of Representatives (the lower house). The Parliament combines elements from the British Westminster system, in which the party or coalition with a majority in the lower house is entitled to form a government, and the United States Senate, which affords equal representation to each of the states, and scrutinises legislation before it can be signed into law.

The upper house, the Senate, consists of 76 members: 12 for each state, and two for each of the two self-governing territories. Senators are elected using the single transferable vote; as a result the chamber features a multitude of parties vying for legislative control. No party or coalition has held a majority in the Senate since 2007, and this usually necessitates negotiation with either the opposition or crossbench to pass legislation.

The lower house, the House of Representatives, consists of 150 members, each elected via full preferential voting from single-member electorates (also known as divisions or seats). This tends to result in the chamber being dominated by two major political groups, the centre‑right to right‑wing Coalition (consisting of the Liberal and National parties) and the centre‑left Labor Party. The government of the day must command the confidence of the House of Representatives in order to gain and remain in power.

The House of Representatives has a maximum term of three years, although it can be dissolved early. The Senate has fixed terms, with half of the state senators' terms expiring every three years (the terms of the four territory senators are linked to House elections, that is, three years). House and Senate elections almost always coincide. A deadlock-breaking mechanism known as a double dissolution can be used to dissolve the full Senate as well as the House if the Senate refuses to pass a piece of legislation passed by the House.

The two houses of Parliament meet in separate chambers at Parliament House (except in rare joint sittings), which itself is located on Capital Hill in Canberra, Australian Capital Territory. Members of the House of Representatives usually convene in the so-called Green Room, while Senators convene in the adjacent Red Room.

== History ==
=== Temporary home in Melbourne (1901–1927) ===
The Commonwealth of Australia came into being on 1 January 1901 with the federation of the six Australian colonies. The inaugural election took place on 29 and 30 March and the first Australian Parliament was opened on 9 May 1901 in Melbourne by Prince George, Duke of Cornwall and York, later King George V. The only building in Melbourne that was large enough to accommodate the 14,000 guests was the western annexe of the Royal Exhibition Building. (Note: The western annexe was later demolished in the 1960s.) After the official opening, from 1901 to 1927 the Parliament met in Parliament House, Melbourne, which it borrowed from the Parliament of Victoria (which sat, instead, in the Royal Exhibition Building until 1927). During this time, Sir Frederick Holder became the first speaker and also the first (and thus far only) parliamentarian to die during a sitting. On 23 July 1909, during an acrimonious debate that had extended through the night to 5 am, Holder exclaimed: "Dreadful, dreadful!" before collapsing as a result of a cerebral haemorrhage.

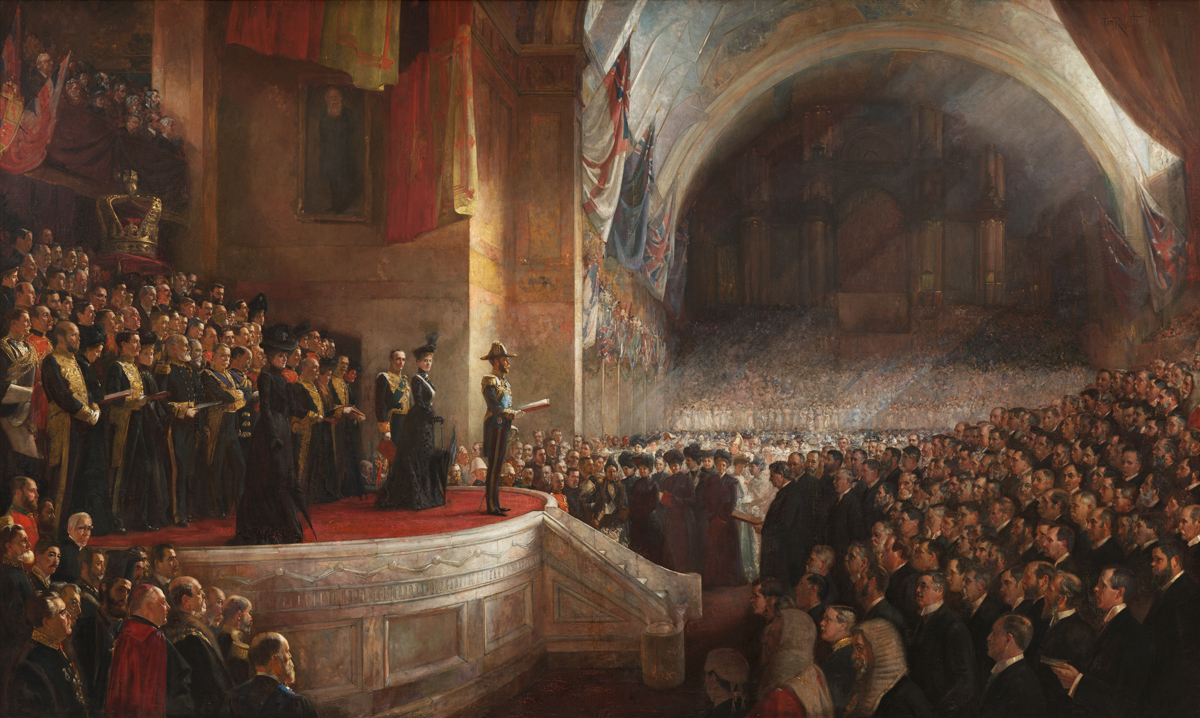
The Big Picture, opening of the Parliament of Australia, 9 May 1901, by Tom Roberts

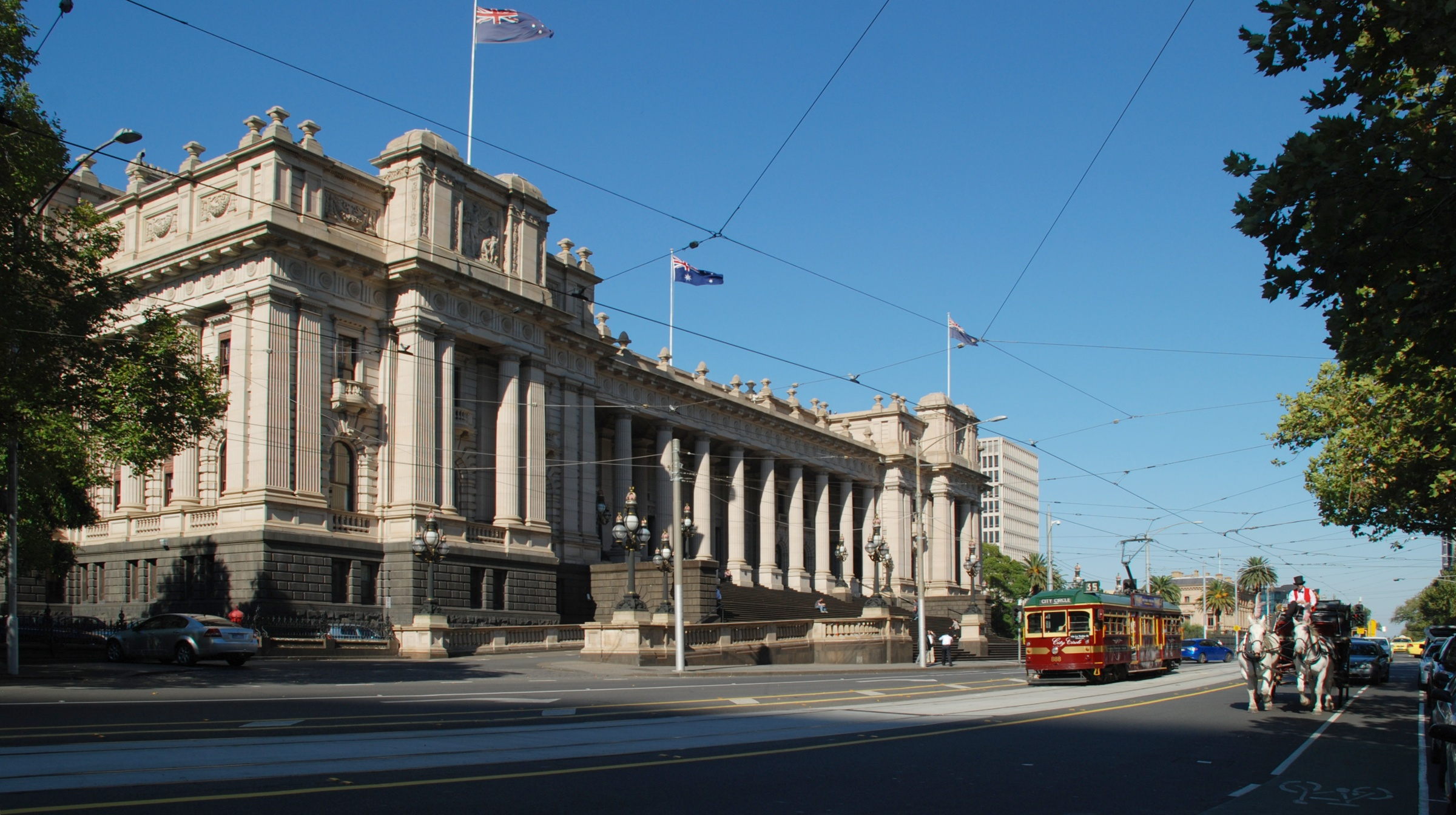
Victorian Parliament House, where the Federal Parliament met until 1927

=== Old Parliament House (1927–1988) ===
The Constitution provided that a new national capital would be established for the nation. This was a compromise at Federation due to the rivalry between the two largest Australian cities, Sydney and Melbourne, which both wished to become the new capital. The site of Canberra was selected for the location of the nation's capital city in 1908. A competition was announced on 30 June 1914 to design Parliament House, with prize money of £7,000. However, due to the start of World War I the next month, the competition was cancelled. It was re-announced in August 1916, but again postponed indefinitely on 24 November 1916. In the meantime, John Smith Murdoch, the Commonwealth's chief architect, worked on the design as part of his official duties. He had little personal enthusiasm for the project, as he felt it was a waste of money and expenditure on it could not be justified at the time. Nevertheless, he designed the building by default.

The construction of Old Parliament House, as it is called today, commenced on 28 August 1923 and was completed in early 1927. It was built by the Commonwealth Department of Works, using workers and materials from all over Australia. The final cost was about £600,000, which was more than three times the original estimate. It was designed to house the parliament for a maximum of 50 years until a permanent facility could be built, but was actually used for more than 60 years.

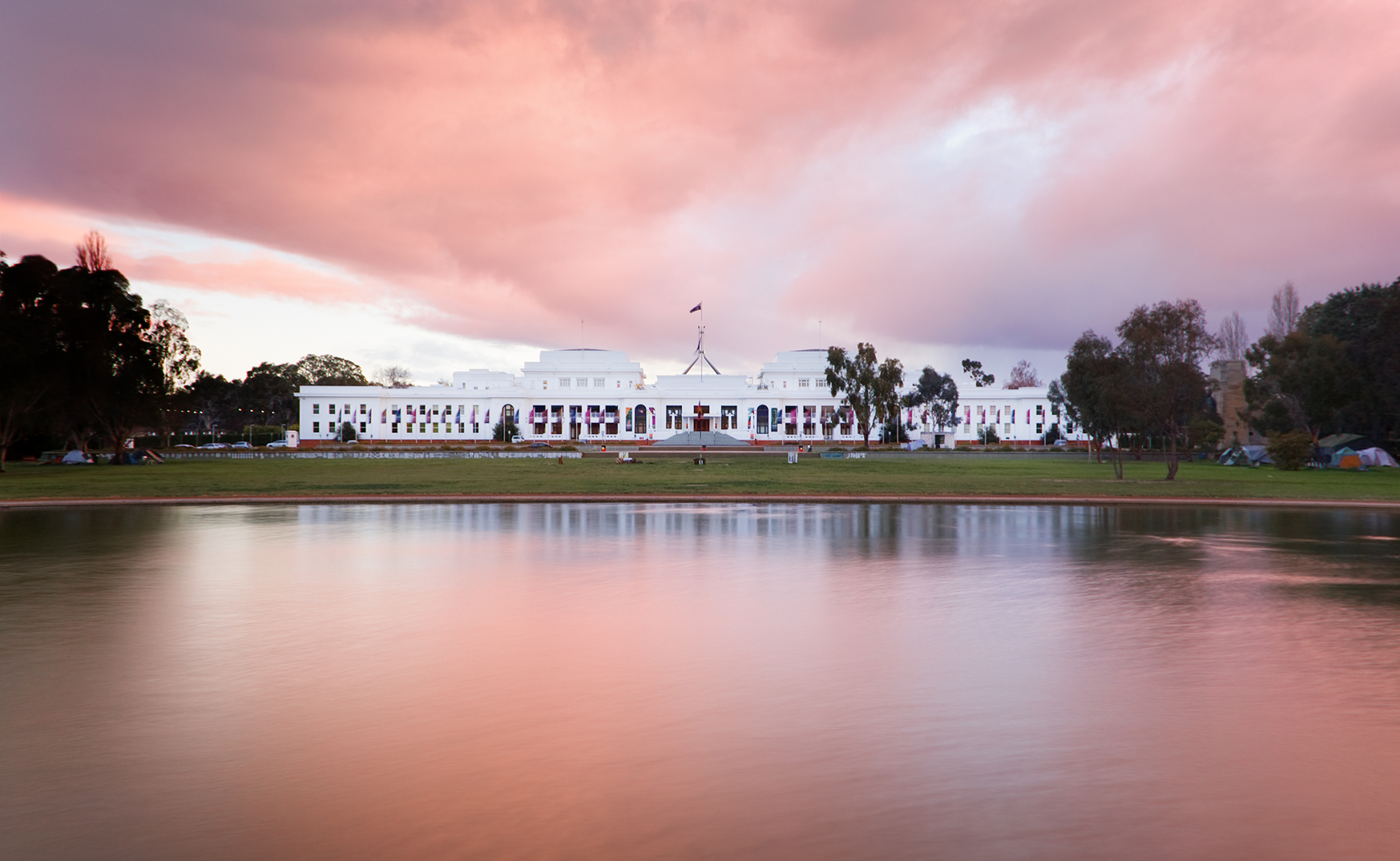
Old Parliament House as viewed from the front

The building was opened on 9 May 1927 by the Duke and Duchess of York (later King George VI and Queen Elizabeth The Queen Mother). The opening ceremonies were both splendid and incongruous, given the sparsely built nature of Canberra of the time and its small population. The building was extensively decorated with Union Jacks and red or blue Australian ensigns. Temporary stands were erected bordering the lawns in front of the Parliament and these were filled with crowds. A Wiradjuri elder, Jimmy Clements, was one of only two Aboriginal Australians present, having walked for about a week from Brungle Station (near Tumut) to be at the event. Dame Nellie Melba sang "God Save the King". The Duke of York unlocked the front doors with a golden key, and led the official party into King's Hall where he unveiled the statue of his father, King George V. The Duke then opened the first parliamentary session in the new Senate Chamber.

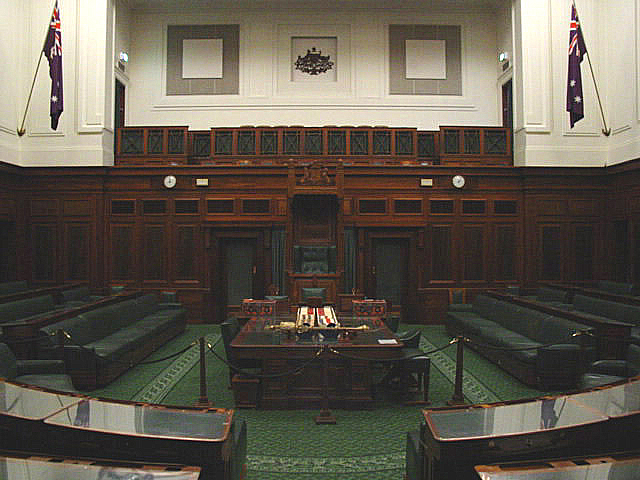
The House of Representatives chamber at Old Parliament House

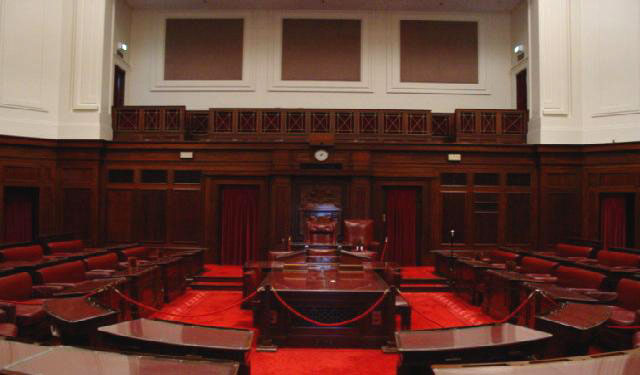
The Senate chamber at Old Parliament House

=== New Parliament House (1988–present) ===
In 1978 the Fraser government decided to proceed with a new building on Capital Hill, and the Parliament House Construction Authority was created. A two-stage competition was announced, for which the Authority consulted the Royal Australian Institute of Architects and, together with the National Capital Development Commission, made available to competitors a brief and competition documents. The design competition drew 329 entries from 29 countries.

The competition winner was the Philadelphia-based architectural firm of Mitchell/Giurgola, with the on-site work directed by the Italian-born architect Romaldo Giurgola, with a design which involved burying most of the building under Capital Hill, and capping the edifice with an enormous spire topped by a large Australian flag. The façades, however, included deliberate imitation of some of the patterns of the Old Parliament House, so that there is a slight resemblance despite the massive difference of scale. The building was also designed to sit above Old Parliament House when seen from a distance.

Construction began in 1981, and the House was intended to be ready by Australia Day, 26 January 1988, the 200th anniversary of European settlement in Australia. It was expected to cost $220 million. Neither the deadline nor the budget was met. In the end it cost more than $1.1 billion to build.

New Parliament House was finally opened by Elizabeth II, Queen of Australia, on 9 May 1988, the anniversary of the opening of both the first Federal Parliament in Melbourne on 9 May 1901 and the Provisional Parliament House in Canberra on 9 May 1927.

In March 2020, the 46th Parliament of Australia was suspended due to the COVID-19 pandemic in Australia; an adjournment rather than prorogation. Its committees would continue to operate using technology. This unprecedented move was accompanied by two motions raised by the Attorney-General of Australia, Christian Porter, and passed on 23 March 2020. One motion was designed to allow MPs to participate in parliament by electronic means, if agreed by the major parties and the speaker; the second determined that with the agreement of the two major parties, the standing orders could be amended without requiring an absolute majority.

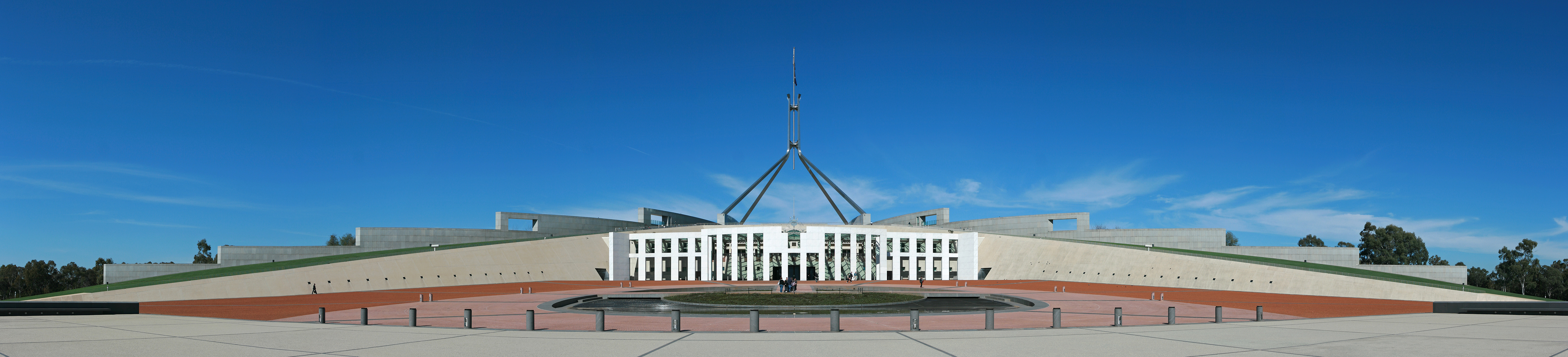
New Parliament House, opened in 1988, was built into Capital Hill behind Old Parliament House

== Composition and electoral systems ==
The Constitution establishes the Commonwealth Parliament, consisting of three components: the King of Australia, the Senate and the House of Representatives.

=== Monarch ===
All of the constitutional functions of the King are exercisable by the governor-general (except the power to appoint the governor-general), whom the King appoints as his federal representative in Australia on the advice of the prime minister. However, by convention, the governor-general exercises these powers only upon the advice of ministers, except for limited circumstances covered by the reserve powers.

In Parliament, the monarch legally shares co-equally the law making powers of the Commonwealth with the Senate and House of Representatives. As such their royal assent (usually expressed by the governor-general) is required for a bill to become an act and thus part of the law. The government does not formally advise the governor-general to grant assent, but it is expected that they will act in accordance with the democratically elected houses of Parliament and assent has never been refused.

=== Senate ===
The upper house of the Australian Parliament consists of 76 members and is called the Senate,. It has founding principles dervied from both the British 'Westminster' traditions and the US 'Washington' models structure, often referred to as the "Wash-minster' model. Drawing inspiration from the United States Senate fundamental structure, the Australian Senate includes an equal number of senators from each state, regardless of population. Conversely the Australian Senate draws many of its traditions and symbols from the British House of Lords (which does not elect members), such as the Red Chamber and the Usher of the Black Rod.

The Constitution allows Parliament to determine the number of senators by legislation, provided that the six original states are equally represented. Furthermore, the Constitution provides that each original state is entitled to at least six senators. However, neither of these provisions applies to any newly admitted states, or to territories. Since an act was passed in 1974, senators have been elected to represent the territories. Currently, the two Northern Territory senators represent the residents of the Northern Territory as well as the Australian external territories of Christmas Island and the Cocos (Keeling) Islands. The two Australian Capital Territory senators represent the Australian Capital Territory, the Jervis Bay Territory and since 1 July 2016, Norfolk Island. Only half of the state Senate seats go up for re-election each three years (except in the case of a double dissolution) as they serve six-year terms; however territory Senators do not have staggered terms and hence face re-election every three years.

Until 1949, each state elected the constitutional minimum of six senators. This number increased to ten from the 1949 election, and was increased again to twelve from the 1984 election. The system for electing senators has changed several times since Federation. The original arrangement used a first-past-the-post block voting, on a state-by-state basis. This was replaced in 1919 by preferential block voting. Block voting tended to produce landslide majorities. For instance, from 1920 to 1923 the Nationalist Party had 35 of the 36 senators, and from 1947 to 1950, the Australian Labor Party had 33 of the 36 senators.

In 1948, single transferable vote proportional representation on a state-by-state basis became the method for electing senators. This change has been described as an "institutional revolution" that has led to the rise of a number of minor parties such as the Democratic Labor Party, the Democrats and the Greens who have taken advantage of this system to achieve parliamentary representation and the balance of power. From the 1984 election, Group voting tickets were introduced in order to reduce a high rate of informal voting but in 2016, group tickets were abolished to end the influence that preference deals amongst parties had on election results and a form of optional preferential voting was introduced.

Section 15 of the Constitution provides that a casual vacancy of a senator shall be filled by the state Parliament. If the previous senator was a member of a particular political party the replacement must come from the same party, but the state Parliament may choose not to fill the vacancy, in which case section 11 requires the Senate to proceed regardless. If the state Parliament happens to be in recess when the vacancy occurs, the Constitution provides that the state governor (acting on the advice of the respective state government) can appoint someone to fill the place until fourteen days after the state Parliament resumes sitting. The state Parliament can also be recalled to ratify a replacement.

=== House of Representatives ===
The lower house of the Australian Parliament, the House of Representatives, is made up of single member electorates with a population of roughly equal size. As is convention in the Westminster system, the party or coalition of parties that has the majority in this House forms the government with the leader of that party or coalition becoming the prime minister. If the government loses the confidence of the House, they are expected to call a new election or resign.

Parliament may determine the number of members of the House of Representatives but the Constitution provides that this number must be "as nearly as practicable, twice the number of Senators"; this requirement is commonly called the "nexus clause". Hence, the House presently consists of 150 members. Each state is allocated seats based on its population; however, each original state, regardless of size, is guaranteed at least five seats. The Constitution does not guarantee representation for the territories. Parliament granted a seat to the Northern Territory in 1922, and to the Australian Capital Territory in 1948; these territorial representatives, however, had only limited voting rights until 1968. Federal electorates have their boundaries redrawn or redistributed whenever a state or territory has its number of seats adjusted, if electorates are not generally matched by population size or if seven years have passed since the most recent redistribution.

From 1901 to 1949, the House consisted of either 74 or 75 members (the Senate had 36). Between 1949 and 1984, it had between 121 and 127 members (the Senate had 60 until 1975, when it increased to 64). In 1977, the High Court ordered that the size of the House be reduced from 127 to 124 members to comply with the nexus provision. In 1984, both the Senate and the House were enlarged; since then the House has had between 148 and 151 members (the Senate has 76).

First-past-the-post voting was used to elect members of the House of Representatives until in 1918 the Nationalist Party government, a predecessor of the modern-day Liberal Party of Australia, changed the lower house voting system to full preferential voting for the subsequent 1919 election. This was in response to Labor unexpectedly winning the 1918 Swan by-election with the largest primary vote, due to vote splitting among the conservative parties. This system has remained in place ever since, allowing the Coalition parties to safely contest the same seats. Full-preferential voting re-elected the Bob Hawke government at the 1990 election, the first time in federal history that Labor had obtained a net benefit from preferential voting.

=== Both houses ===
It is not possible to be simultaneously a member of both the Senate and the House of Representatives, but a number of people have been members of both houses at different times in their parliamentary career.

Only Australian citizens are eligible for election to either house. They must not also be a subject or citizen of a "foreign power". When the Constitution was drafted, all Australians (and other inhabitants of the British empire) were British subjects, so the word "foreign" meant outside the Empire. But, in the landmark case Sue v Hill (1999), the High Court of Australia ruled that, at least since the passage of the Australia Act 1986, Britain has been a "foreign power", so that British citizens are also excluded.

Compulsory voting was introduced for federal elections in 1924. The immediate justification for compulsory voting was the low voter turnout (59.38%) at the 1922 federal election, down from 71.59% at the 1919 federal election. Compulsory voting was not on the platform of either the Stanley Bruce-led Nationalist/Country party coalition government or the Matthew Charlton-led Labor opposition. The actual initiative for change was made by Herbert Payne, a backbench Tasmanian Nationalist Senator who on 16 July 1924 introduced a private Senator's bill in the Senate. Payne's bill was passed with little debate (the House of Representatives agreeing to it in less than an hour), and in neither house was a division required, hence no votes were recorded against the bill. The 1925 federal election was the first to be conducted under compulsory voting, which saw the turnout figure rise to 91.4%. The turnout increased to about 95% within a couple of elections and has stayed at about that level since.

Since 1973, citizens have had the right to vote upon turning 18. Prior to this it was 21.

Australian Federal Police officers armed with assault rifles have been situated in the Federal Parliament since 2015. It is the first time in Australian history that a parliament has possessed armed personnel.

== Procedure ==
Each of the two Houses elects a presiding officer. The presiding officer of the Senate is called the President; that of the House of Representatives is the Speaker. Elections for these positions are by secret ballot. Both offices are conventionally filled by members of the governing party, but the presiding officers are expected to oversee debate and enforce the rules in an impartial manner.

The Constitution authorises Parliament to set the quorum for each chamber. The quorum of the Senate is one-quarter of the total membership (nineteen); that of the House of Representatives is one-fifth of the total membership (thirty-one). In theory, if a quorum is not present, then a House may not continue to meet. In practice, members usually agree not to notice that a quorum is not present, so that debates on routine bills can continue while other members attend to other business outside the chamber. Sometimes the Opposition will "call a quorum" as a tactic to annoy the Government or delay proceedings, particularly when the Opposition feels it has been unfairly treated in the House. Proceedings are interrupted until a quorum is present. It is the responsibility of the government whip to ensure that, when a quorum is called, enough government members are present to form a quorum.

Both Houses may determine motions by voice vote: the presiding officer puts the question, and, after listening to shouts of "Aye" and "No" from the members, announces the result. The announcement of the presiding officer settles the question, unless at least two members demand a "division", or a recorded vote. In that case the bells are rung throughout Parliament House summoning Senators or Members to the chamber. During a division, members who favour the motion move to the right side of the chamber (the side to the Speaker's or President's right), and those opposed move to the left. They are then counted by "tellers" (government and opposition whips), and the motion is passed or defeated accordingly. In the Senate, in order not to deprive a state of a vote in what is supposed to be a states' house, the president is permitted a vote along with other senators (however, that right is rarely exercised); in the case of a tie, the president does not have a casting vote and the motion fails. In the House of Representatives, the Speaker does not vote, but has a casting vote if there is a tie.

Most legislation is introduced into the House of Representatives and goes through a number of stages before it becomes law. The legislative process occurs in English, although other Australian parliaments have permitted use of Indigenous languages with English translation. Government bills are drafted by the Office of Parliamentary Counsel.

The first stage is a first reading, where the legislation is introduced to the chamber, then there is a second reading, where a vote is taken on the general outlines of the bill. Although rare, the legislation can then be considered by a House committee, which reports back to the House on any recommendations. This is followed by a consideration in detail stage, where the House can consider the clauses of the bill in detail and make any amendments. This is finally followed by a third reading, where the bill is either passed or rejected by the House. If passed, the legislation is then sent to the Senate, which has a similar structure of debate and passage except that consideration of bills by Senate committees is more common than in the House and the consideration in detail stage is replaced by a committee of the whole. Once a bill has been passed by both Houses in the same form, it is then presented to the governor-general for royal assent.

== Functions ==
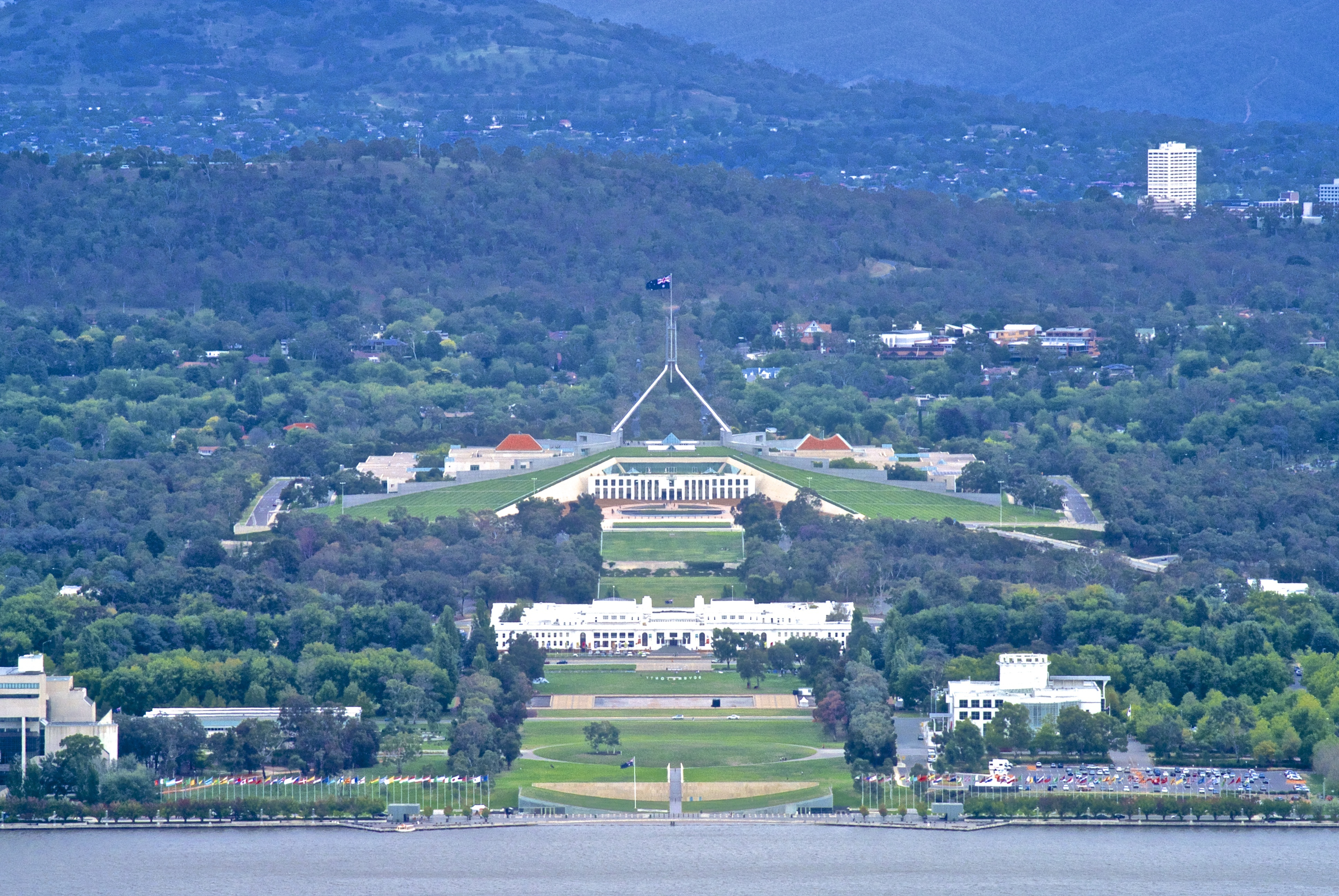
Canberra from Mount Ainslie: across the lake is Old Parliament House and behind it the new Parliament House

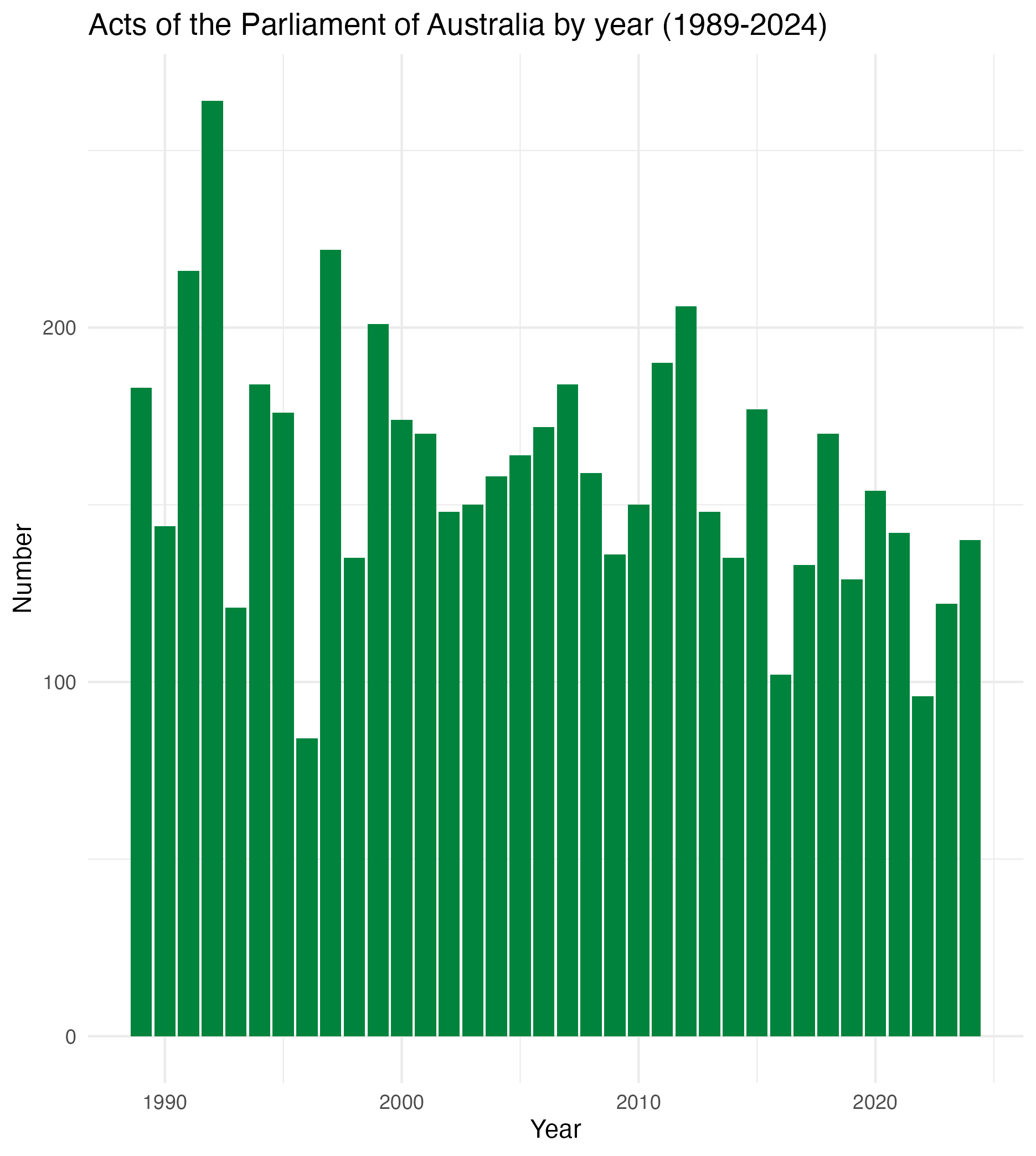
Bar chart showing the number of acts of the Parliament of Australia by year (1989–2024)

The principal function of the Parliament is to pass laws, or legislation. Any parliamentarian may introduce a proposed law (a bill), except for a money bill (a bill proposing an expenditure or levying a tax), which must be introduced in the House of Representatives. In practice, the great majority of bills are introduced by ministers. Bills introduced by other members are called private members' bills. All bills must be passed by both houses and assented to by the governor-general to become law. The Senate has the same legislative powers as the House, except that it may not amend or introduce money bills, only pass or reject them. The enacting formula for acts of Parliament since 1990 is simply "The Parliament of Australia enacts:".

Commonwealth legislative power is limited to that granted in the Constitution. Powers not specified are considered "residual powers", and remain the domain of the states. Section 51 grants the Commonwealth power over areas such as taxation, external affairs, defence and marriage. Section 51 also allows state parliaments to refer matters to the Commonwealth to legislate.

Section 96 of the Australian Constitution gives the Commonwealth Parliament the power to grant money to any State, "on such terms and conditions as the Parliament thinks fit". In effect, the Commonwealth can make grants subject to states implementing particular policies in their fields of legislative responsibility. Such grants, known as "tied grants" (since they are tied to a particular purpose), have been used to give the federal parliament influence over state policy matters such as public hospitals and schools.

The Parliament performs other functions besides legislation. It can discuss urgency motions or matters of public importance: these provide a forum for debates on public policy matters. Senators and members can move motions on a range of matters relevant to their constituents, and can also move motions of censure against the government or individual ministers. On most sitting days in each house there is a session called question time in which senators and members address questions without notice to the prime minister and other ministers. Senators and members can also present petitions from their constituents. Both houses have an extensive system of committees in which draft bills are debated, matters of public policy are inquired into, evidence is taken and public servants are questioned. There are also joint committees, composed of members from both houses.

== Conflict between the houses ==
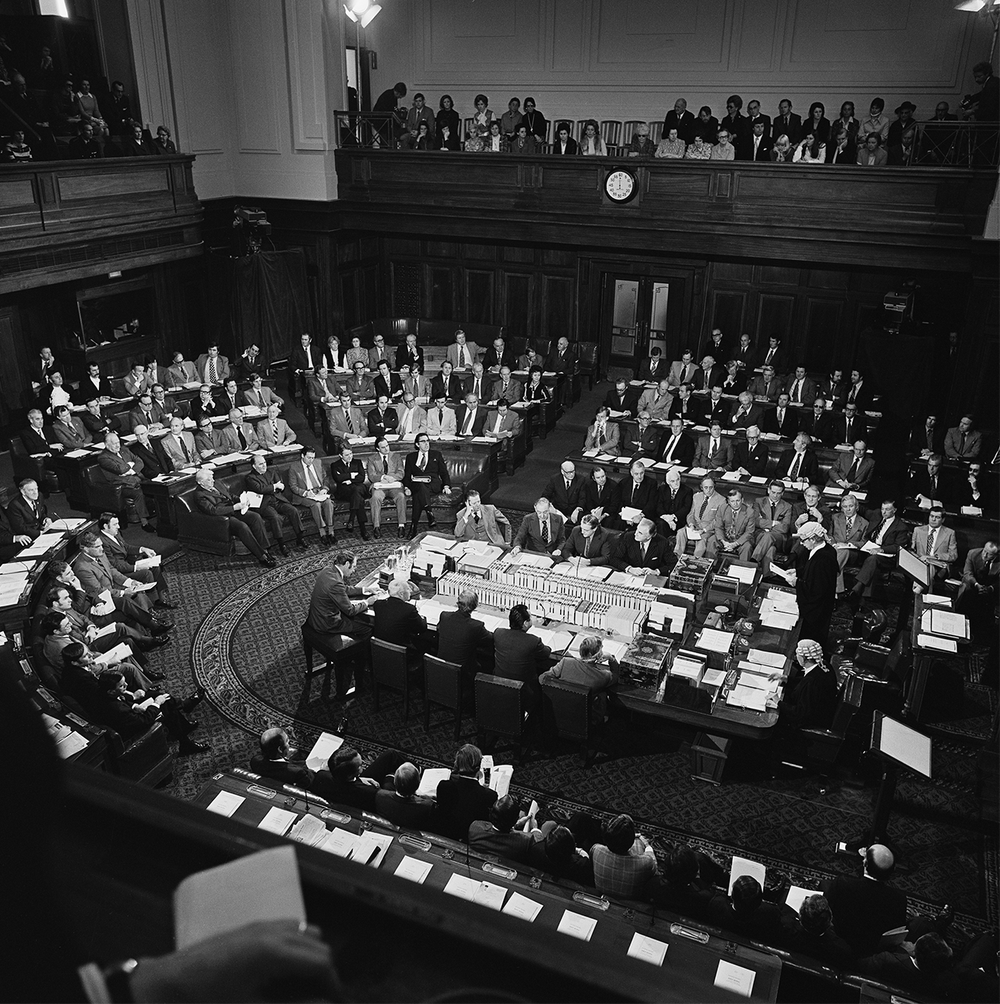
The Joint Sitting of the Australian Parliament of 1974

In the event of conflict between the two houses over the final form of legislation, the Constitution provides for a simultaneous dissolution of both houses – known as a double dissolution. Section 57 of the Constitution states that,

If the House of Representatives passes any proposed law, and the Senate rejects or fails to pass it, or passes it with amendments to which the House of Representatives will not agree, and if after an interval of three months the House of Representatives, in the same or the next session, again passes the proposed law with or without any amendments which have been made, suggested, or agreed to by the Senate, and the Senate rejects or fails to pass it, or passes it with amendments to which the House of Representatives will not agree, the Governor-General may dissolve the Senate and the House of Representatives simultaneously.

In an election following a double dissolution, each state elects their entire 12-seat Senate delegation, while the two territories represented in the Senate each elect their two senators as they would in a regular federal election. Because all seats are contested in the same election, it is easier for smaller parties to win seats under the single transferable vote system: the quota for the election of each senator in each Australian state in a full Senate election is 7.69% of the vote, while in a normal half-Senate election the quota is 14.28%.

If the conflict continues after such an election, the governor-general may convene a joint sitting of both houses to consider the bill or bills, including any amendments which have been previously proposed in either house, or any new amendments. If a bill is passed by an absolute majority of the total membership of the joint sitting, it is treated as though it had been passed separately by both houses, and is presented for royal assent. With proportional representation, and the small majorities in the Senate compared to the generally larger majorities in the House of Representatives, and the requirement that the number of members of the lower house be "nearly as practicable" twice that of the Senate, a joint sitting after a double dissolution is more likely than not to lead to a victory for the lower house over the Senate. This provision has only been invoked on one occasion, after the election following the 1974 double dissolution. However, there are other occasions when the two houses meet as one.

== Committees ==
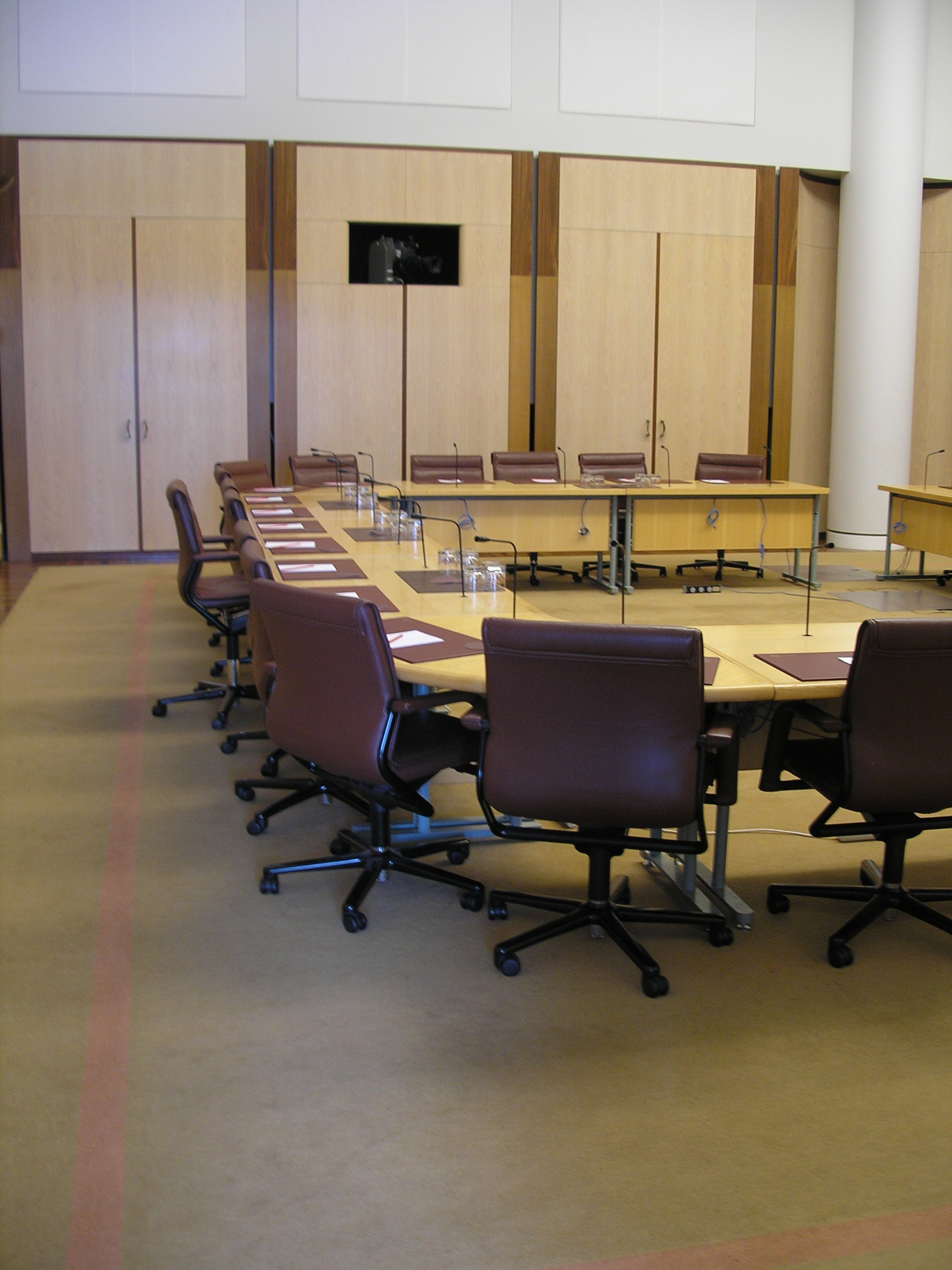
A Senate committee room in Parliament House, Canberra

A short video on Australian Parliamentary Committees

In addition to the work of the main chambers, both the Senate and the House of Representatives have a large number of investigatory and scrutiny committees which deal with matters referred to them by their respective houses or ministers. They provide the opportunity for all members and senators to ask questions of witnesses, including ministers and public officials, as well as conduct inquiries, and examine policy and legislation. Once a particular inquiry is completed the members of the committee can then produce a report, to be tabled in Parliament, outlining what they have discovered as well as any recommendations that they have produced for the government or house to consider.

The ability of the houses of Parliament to establish committees is referenced in section 49 of the Constitution, which states that,

The powers, privileges, and immunities of the Senate and of the House of Representatives, and of the members and the committees of each House, shall be such as are declared by the Parliament, and until declared shall be those of the Commons House of Parliament of the United Kingdom, and of its members and committees, at the establishment of the Commonwealth.

Parliamentary committees can be given a wide range of powers. One of the most significant powers is the ability to summon people to attend hearings in order to give evidence and submit documents. Anyone who attempts to hinder the work of a Parliamentary committee may be found to be in contempt of Parliament. There are a number of ways that witnesses can be found in contempt, these include; refusing to appear before a committee when summoned, refusing to answer a question during a hearing or to produce a document, or later being found to have lied to or misled a committee. Anyone who attempts to influence a witness may also be found in contempt. Other powers include, the ability to meet throughout Australia, to establish subcommittees and to take evidence in both public and private hearings.

Proceedings of committees are considered to have the same legal standing as proceedings of Parliament, they are recorded by Hansard, except for private proceedings, and also operate under the protections of parliamentary privilege. Every participant, including committee members and witnesses giving evidence, is protected from being prosecuted under any civil or criminal action for anything they may say during a hearing. Written evidence and documents received by a committee are also protected.

Types of committees include:

Standing committees, which are established on an ongoing basis and are responsible for scrutinising bills and topics referred to them by the chamber or minister; examining the government's budget and activities (in what is called the budget estimates process); and for examining departmental annual reports and activities.

Select committees, which are temporary committees, established in order to consider a particular matter. A select committee expires when it has published its final report on an inquiry.

Domestic committees, which are responsible for administering aspects of the Parliament's own affairs. These include the Selection Committees of both Houses that determine how the Parliament will deal with particular pieces of legislation and private members' business, and the Privileges Committees that deal with matters of parliamentary privilege.

Legislative scrutiny committees, which examine legislation and regulations to determine their impact on individual rights and accountability.

Joint committees are also established to include both members of the House of Representatives and the Senate. Joint committees may be standing (ongoing) or select (temporary) in nature.

== Relationship with the government ==
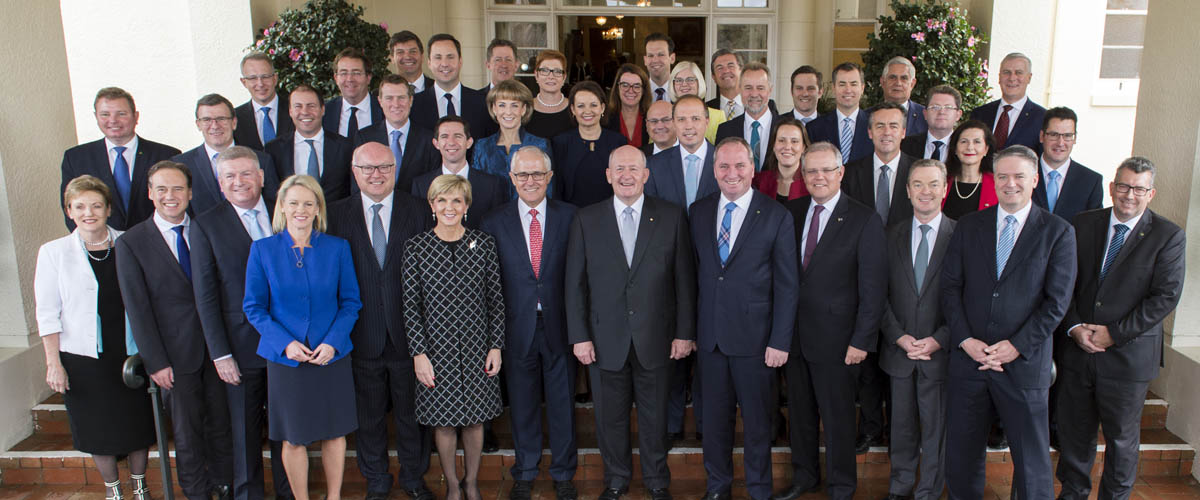
Governor-General Sir Peter Cosgrove with members of the Second Turnbull Ministry

Under the Constitution, the governor-general has the power to appoint and dismiss ministers who administer government departments. In practice, the governor-general chooses ministers in accordance with the traditions of the Westminster system. The governor-general appoints as prime minister the leader of the party that has a majority of seats in the House of Representatives; the governor-general then, on the advice of the prime minister, appoints the other ministers, chosen from the majority party or coalition of parties.

These ministers then meet in a council known as cabinet. Cabinet meetings are strictly private and occur once a week where vital issues are discussed and policy formulated. The Constitution does not recognise the Cabinet as a legal entity; it exists solely by convention. Its decisions do not in and of themselves have legal force. However, it serves as the practical expression of the Federal Executive Council, which is Australia's highest formal governmental body. In practice, the Federal Executive Council meets solely to endorse and give legal force to decisions already made by the Cabinet. All members of the Cabinet are members of the executive council. The governor-general is bound by convention to follow the advice of the executive council on almost all occasions, giving it de facto executive power. A senior member of the Cabinet holds the office of vice-president of the executive council and acts as presiding officer of the executive council in the absence of the governor-general. The Federal Executive Council is the Australian equivalent of the executive councils and privy councils in other Commonwealth realms such as the King's Privy Council for Canada and the Privy Council of the United Kingdom.

A minister is not required to be a senator or member of the House of Representatives at the time of their appointment, but their office is forfeited if they do not become a member of either house within three months of their appointment. This provision was included in the Constitution (section 64)Australian Constitution (Cth) s 64 to enable the inaugural ministry, led by Edmund Barton, to be appointed on 1 January 1901, even though the first federal elections were not scheduled to be held until 29 and 30 March.

After the 1949 election, John Spicer and Bill Spooner became ministers in the Menzies Government on 19 December, despite their terms in the Senate not beginning until 22 February 1950.

The provision was also used after the disappearance and presumed death of the Liberal prime minister Harold Holt in December 1967. The Liberal Party elected John Gorton, then a senator, as its new leader, and he was sworn in as prime minister on 10 January 1968 (following an interim ministry led by John McEwen). On 1 February, Gorton resigned from the Senate to stand for the 24 February by-election in Holt's former House of Representatives electorate of Higgins due to the convention that the prime minister be a member of the lower house. For 22 days (2 to 23 February inclusive) he was prime minister while a member of neither house of parliament.

On a number of occasions when ministers have retired from their seats prior to an election, or stood but lost their own seats in the election, they have retained their ministerial offices until the next government is sworn in.

== Role of the Senate ==
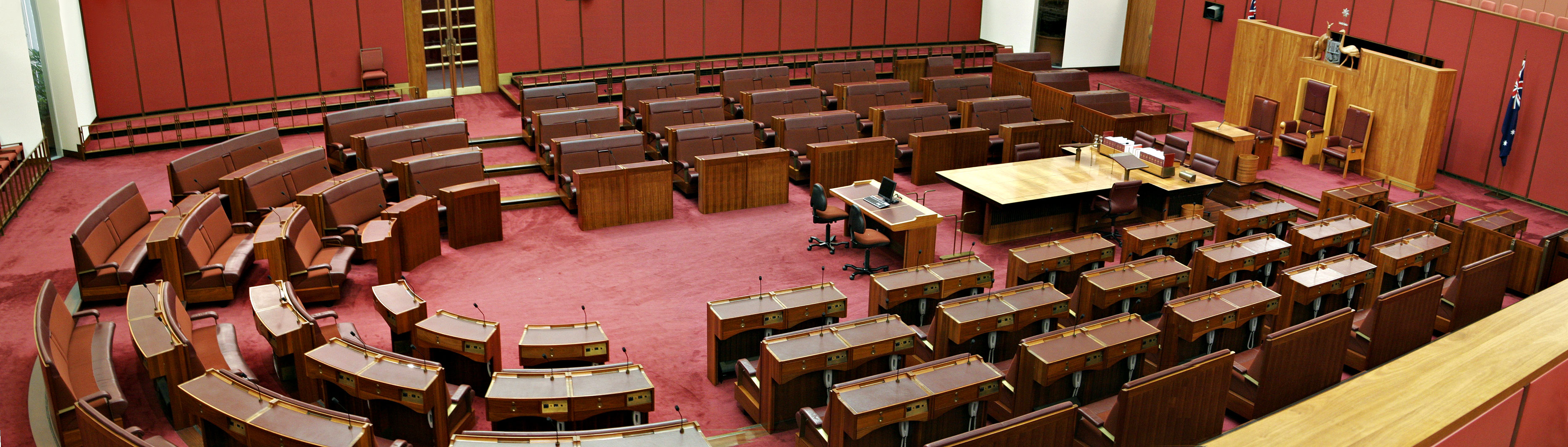
The Australian Senate

Unlike upper Houses in other Westminster system governments, the Senate is not a vestigial body with limited legislative power. Rather it was intended to play – and does play – an active role in legislation. Rather than being modelled solely after the House of Lords, as the Canadian Senate was, the Australian Senate was in part modelled after the United States Senate, by giving equal representation to each state. The Constitution intended to give less populous states added voice in a federal legislature, while also providing for the revising role of an upper house in the Westminster system.

One of the functions of the Senate, both directly and through its committees, is to scrutinise government activity. The vigour of this scrutiny has been fuelled for many years by the fact that the party in government has seldom had a majority in the Senate. Whereas in the House of Representatives the government's majority has sometimes limited that chamber's capacity to implement executive scrutiny, the opposition and minor parties have been able to use their Senate numbers as a basis for conducting inquiries into government operations.

The Constitution prevents the Senate from originating or amending the annual appropriation bills "for the ordinary annual services of the Government"; they may only defer or reject them. As a result, whilst the framers of the Constitution intended that the executive government would require the support of the House of Representatives, the text of the Constitution also effectively allows the Senate to bring down the government once a year by blocking the annual appropriations bills, also known as blocking supply.

The ability to block supply was the origin of the 1975 Australian constitutional crisis. The Opposition used its numbers in the Senate to defer supply bills, refusing to deal with them until an election was called for both houses of parliament, an election which it hoped to win. The prime minister, Gough Whitlam, contested the legitimacy of the blocking and refused to resign. The prime minister argued that a government may continue in office for as long as it has the support of the lower house, while the opposition argued that any government who has been denied supply is obliged to either call new elections or resign. In response to the deadlock, the governor-general Sir John Kerr dismissed Whitlam's government and appointed Malcolm Fraser as caretaker prime minister on the understanding that he could secure supply and would immediately call new elections. This action in itself was a source of controversy and debate continues on the proper usage of the Senate's ability to block supply and on whether such a power should even exist.

The blocking of supply alone cannot force a double dissolution. There must be legislation repeatedly blocked by the Senate which the government can then choose to use as a trigger for a double dissolution.

== Parliamentary departments ==
There are four parliamentary departments supporting the Australian Parliament:

- Department of the Senate, which consists of seven Offices and whose work is determined by the Senate and its committees.
- Department of the House of Representatives, which provides various services to support the smooth operation of the House of Representatives, its committees and certain joint committees.
- Department of Parliamentary Services (DPS), which performs diverse support functions, such as research; the Parliamentary Library of Australia; broadcasting on radio and TV; Hansard transcripts; computing services; and general maintenance and security.
- Parliamentary Budget Office (PBO), which "improves transparency around fiscal and budget policy issues" and provides costing services to parliamentarians.

== Privileges ==
Members of the Australian Parliament do not have legal immunity: they can be arrested and tried for any offence. They do, however, have parliamentary privilege: they cannot be sued for anything they say in Parliament about each other or about persons outside the Parliament. This privilege extends to reporting in the media of anything a senator or member says in Parliament. The proceedings of parliamentary committees, wherever they meet, are also covered by privilege, and this extends to witnesses before such committees.

From the beginning of Federation until 1987, parliamentary privilege operated under section 49 of the Constitution, which established the privileges of both houses and their members to be the same as the House of Commons of the United Kingdom at the time of the Constitution's enactment. The Parliament was also given the power to amend its privileges. In 1987, the Parliament passed the Parliamentary Privileges Act, which clarified the meaning and extent of privilege as well as how the Parliament deals with breaches.

There is a legal offence called contempt of Parliament. A person who speaks or acts in a manner contemptuous of the Parliament or its members can be tried and, if convicted, imprisoned. The Parliament previously had the power to hear such cases itself, and did so in the Browne–Fitzpatrick privilege case, 1955. This power has now been delegated to the courts. There have been few convictions. In May 2007, Harriet Swift, an anti-logging activist from New South Wales was convicted and reprimanded for contempt of Parliament, after she wrote fictitious press releases and letters purporting to be from Federal MP Gary Nairn as an April Fools' Day prank.

== Salaries of parliamentarians ==
The salaries of parliamentarians and other parliamentary office holders are determined by the Remuneration Tribunal, an independent statutory body. Since 1 July 2025, the basic annual salary of a federal parliamentarian is $239,270. Parliamentarians are also paid allowances (such as for travel and post-retirement), superannuation and expenses. Parliamentarians who are ministers or who hold another parliamentary office are also entitled to an additional salary, being a certain percentage of the base salary. These are listed below:

Parliamentarian salary Rounded to the nearest $10 (list incomplete)
Office	Additional %	Additional $	Total annual salary
Prime Minister	160%	$382,830	$622,100
Deputy Prime Minister	105%	$251,230	$490,500
Treasurer	87.5%	$209,360	$448,630
Senate Leader of Government	87.5%	$209,360	$448,630
House Leader of Government	75%	$179,450	$418,720
Cabinet Minister	72.5%	$173,470	$412,740
Non-Cabinet Minister	57.5%	$137,580	$376,850
Parliamentary Secretary/Assistant Minister	25%	$59,820	$299,090
Leader of the Opposition	85%	$203,380	$442,650
Speaker	75%	$179,450	$418,720
President	75%	$179,450	$418,720
Shadow Minister	25%	$59,820	$299,090

== Broadcasting ==
Radio broadcasts of parliamentary proceedings began on 10 July 1946. They were originally broadcast on Radio National. Since August 1994 they have been broadcast on ABC News, a government-owned channel set up specifically for this function. It operates 24 hours a day and broadcasts other news items when parliament is not sitting.

The first televised parliamentary event was the historic 1974 Joint Sitting. Regular free-to-air television broadcasts of question time began in August 1990 from the Senate and February 1991 from the House of Representatives. Question time from the House of Representatives is televised live, and the Senate question time is recorded and broadcast later that day. Other free-to-air televised broadcasts include: the Treasurer's Budget speech and the Leader of the Opposition's reply to the Budget two days later; the opening of Parliament by the governor-general; the swearing-in of governors-general; and addresses to the Parliament by visiting heads of state.

In 2009, the pay TV company Foxtel launched A-SPAN, now called News24 World, which broadcasts live sittings of the House of Representatives and the Senate, parliamentary committee meetings and political press conferences.

The Parliament House official website provides free extensive daily proceedings of both chambers as well as committee hearings live on the Internet.

== Historical compositions ==
=== Senate compositions ===
The Senate has included representatives from a range of political parties, including several parties that have seldom or never had representation in the House of Representatives, but which have consistently secured a small but significant level of electoral support, as the table shows.

Results represent the composition of the Senate after the elections. The full Senate has been contested on eight occasions; the inaugural election and seven double dissolutions. These are highlighted in puce.

Election Year		ALP Labor	LIB Liberal (Note: Includes results for the Free Trade Party for 1901 and 1903, the Anti-Socialist Party for 1906, the Commonwealth Liberal Party for 1910—1914, the Nationalist Party for 1917—1929, and the United Australia Party for 1931—1943.)		NAT National (Note: Includes results for the Country Party for 1919—1974 and the National Country Party for 1975—1980.)	DLP Labor DLP	DEM Democrats	GRN Greens	CLP CLP	IND Independent	Other parties		Total seats	Electoral system
Election Year		ALP Labor	LIB Liberal		NAT National	DLP Labor DLP	DEM Democrats	GRN Greens	CLP CLP	IND Independent	Name	Seats	Total seats	Electoral system
1st	1901	8	11 (Note: Protectionist Party)	17	—N/a	—N/a	—N/a	—N/a	—N/a	—N/a	—N/a	—N/a	36	(Note: Plurality-at-large voting)
2nd	1903	8	12	14	—N/a	—N/a	—N/a	—N/a	—N/a	1	Revenue Tariff	1	36	
3rd	1906	15	6	13	—N/a	—N/a	—N/a	—N/a	—N/a	2	—N/a	—N/a	36	
4th	1910	22	14		—N/a	—N/a	—N/a	—N/a	—N/a	—N/a	—N/a	—N/a	36	
5th	1913	29	7		—N/a	—N/a	—N/a	—N/a	—N/a	—N/a	—N/a	—N/a	36	
6th	1914	31	5		—N/a	—N/a	—N/a	—N/a	—N/a	—N/a	—N/a	—N/a	36	
7th	1917	12	24		—N/a	—N/a	—N/a	—N/a	—N/a	—N/a	—N/a	—N/a	36	
8th	1919	1	35		—N/a	—N/a	—N/a	—N/a	—N/a	—N/a	—N/a	—N/a	36	(Note: Preferential block voting)
9th	1922	12	24		—N/a	—N/a	—N/a	—N/a	—N/a	—N/a	—N/a	—N/a	36	
10th	1925	8	25		3	—N/a	—N/a	—N/a	—N/a	—N/a	—N/a	—N/a	36	
11th	1928	7	24		5	—N/a	—N/a	—N/a	—N/a	—N/a	—N/a	—N/a	36	
12th	1931	10	21		5	—N/a	—N/a	—N/a	—N/a	—N/a	—N/a	—N/a	36	
13th	1934	3	26		7	—N/a	—N/a	—N/a	—N/a	—N/a	—N/a	—N/a	36	
14th	1937	16	16		4	—N/a	—N/a	—N/a	—N/a	—N/a	—N/a	—N/a	36	
15th	1940	17	15		4	—N/a	—N/a	—N/a	—N/a	—N/a	—N/a	—N/a	36	
16th	1943	22	12		2	—N/a	—N/a	—N/a	—N/a	—N/a	—N/a	—N/a	36	
17th	1946	33	2		1	—N/a	—N/a	—N/a	—N/a	—N/a	—N/a	—N/a	36	
18th	1949	34	21		5	—N/a	—N/a	—N/a	—N/a	—N/a	—N/a	—N/a	60	
19th	1951	28	26		6	—N/a	—N/a	—N/a	—N/a	—N/a	—N/a	—N/a	60	(Note: Single transferable vote)
20th	1953	29	26		5	—N/a	—N/a	—N/a	—N/a	—N/a	—N/a	—N/a	60	
21st	1955	28	24		6	2	—N/a	—N/a	—N/a	—N/a	—N/a	—N/a	60	
22nd	1958	26	25		7	2	—N/a	—N/a	—N/a	—N/a	—N/a	—N/a	60	
23rd	1961	28	24		6	1	—N/a	—N/a	—N/a	1	—N/a	—N/a	60	
24th	1964	27	23		7	2	—N/a	—N/a	—N/a	1	—N/a	—N/a	60	
25th	1967	27	21		7	4	—N/a	—N/a	—N/a	1	—N/a	—N/a	60	
26th	1970	26	21		5	5	—N/a	—N/a	—N/a	3	—N/a	—N/a	60	
27th	1974	29	23		6	—N/a	—N/a	—N/a	—N/a	1	Liberal Movement	1	60	
28th	1975	27	26		8	—N/a	—N/a	—N/a	1	1	Liberal Movement	1	64	
29th	1977	27	27		6	—N/a	2	—N/a	1	1	—N/a	—N/a	64	
30th	1980	27	27		3	—N/a	5	—N/a	1	1	—N/a	—N/a	64	
31st	1983	30	23		4	—N/a	5	—N/a	1	1	—N/a	—N/a	64	
32nd	1984	34	27		5	—N/a	7	—N/a	1	1	Nuclear Disarmament	1	76	(Note: Preferential block voting (Group voting ticket))
33rd	1987	32	26		7	—N/a	7	—N/a	1	2	Nuclear Disarmament	1	76	
34th	1990	32	28		5	—N/a	8	—N/a	1	1	Greens (WA)	1	76	
35th	1993	30	29		6	—N/a	7	—N/a	1	1	Greens (WA)	2	76	
36th	1996	29	31		5	—N/a	7	—N/a	1	1	Greens (WA)	1	76	
36th	1996	29	31		5	—N/a	7	—N/a	1	1	Greens (Tas)	1	76	
36th	1996	29	31		5	—N/a	7	—N/a	1	1	Total	2	76	
37th	1998	29	31		3	—N/a	9	1	1	1	One Nation	1	76	
38th	2001	28	31		3	—N/a	8	2	1	2	One Nation	1	76	
39th	2004	28	33		5	—N/a	4	4	1	—N/a	Family First	1	76	
40th	2007	32	32		4	—N/a	—N/a	5	1	1	Family First	1	76	
41st	2010	31	28 (+3 LNP)		2	1	—N/a	9	1	1	—N/a	—N/a	76	
42nd	2013	25	23 (+5 LNP)		3 (+1 LNP)	1	—N/a	10	1	1	Family First	1	76	
42nd	2013	25	23 (+5 LNP)		3 (+1 LNP)	1	—N/a	10	1	1	Liberal Democrats	1	76	
42nd	2013	25	23 (+5 LNP)		3 (+1 LNP)	1	—N/a	10	1	1	Motoring Enthusiast	1	76	
42nd	2013	25	23 (+5 LNP)		3 (+1 LNP)	1	—N/a	10	1	1	Palmer United	3	76	
42nd	2013	25	23 (+5 LNP)		3 (+1 LNP)	1	—N/a	10	1	1	Total	6	76	
43rd	2016	26	21 (+3 LNP)		3 (+2 LNP)	—N/a	—N/a	9	1	—N/a	Family First	1	76	(Note: Single transferable vote (Optional preferential voting))
43rd	2016	26	21 (+3 LNP)		3 (+2 LNP)	—N/a	—N/a	9	1	—N/a	Liberal Democrats	1	76	(Note: Single transferable vote (Optional preferential voting))
43rd	2016	26	21 (+3 LNP)		3 (+2 LNP)	—N/a	—N/a	9	1	—N/a	Jacqui Lambie	1	76	(Note: Single transferable vote (Optional preferential voting))
43rd	2016	26	21 (+3 LNP)		3 (+2 LNP)	—N/a	—N/a	9	1	—N/a	Justice Party	1	76	(Note: Single transferable vote (Optional preferential voting))
43rd	2016	26	21 (+3 LNP)		3 (+2 LNP)	—N/a	—N/a	9	1	—N/a	Nick Xenophon Team	3	76	(Note: Single transferable vote (Optional preferential voting))
43rd	2016	26	21 (+3 LNP)		3 (+2 LNP)	—N/a	—N/a	9	1	—N/a	One Nation	4	76	(Note: Single transferable vote (Optional preferential voting))
43rd	2016	26	21 (+3 LNP)		3 (+2 LNP)	—N/a	—N/a	9	1	—N/a	Total	11	76	(Note: Single transferable vote (Optional preferential voting))
44th	2019	26	26 (+4 LNP)		2 (+2 LNP)	—N/a	—N/a	9	1	1	Jacqui Lambie	1	76	
44th	2019	26	26 (+4 LNP)		2 (+2 LNP)	—N/a	—N/a	9	1	1	Centre Alliance	2	76	
44th	2019	26	26 (+4 LNP)		2 (+2 LNP)	—N/a	—N/a	9	1	1	One Nation	2	76	
44th	2019	26	26 (+4 LNP)		2 (+2 LNP)	—N/a	—N/a	9	1	1	Total	5	76	
45th	2022	26	23 (+5 LNP)		3	—N/a	—N/a	12	1	1	United Australia	1	76	(Note: Single transferable vote (Proportional representation))
45th	2022	26	23 (+5 LNP)		3	—N/a	—N/a	12	1	1	Jacqui Lambie	2	76	(Note: Single transferable vote (Proportional representation))
45th	2022	26	23 (+5 LNP)		3	—N/a	—N/a	12	1	1	One Nation	2	76	(Note: Single transferable vote (Proportional representation))
45th	2022	26	23 (+5 LNP)		3	—N/a	—N/a	12	1	1	Total	5	76	(Note: Single transferable vote (Proportional representation))
46th	2025	28	26		9	—N/a	—N/a	11	1	4	Jacqui Lambie	1	76	
46th	2025	28	26		9	—N/a	—N/a	11	1	4	United Australia	1	76	
46th	2025	28	26		9	—N/a	—N/a	11	1	4	Australia's Voice	1	76	
46th	2025	28	26		9	—N/a	—N/a	11	1	4	People First	1	76	
46th	2025	28	26		9	—N/a	—N/a	11	1	4	One Nation	2	76	
46th	2025	28	26		9	—N/a	—N/a	11	1	4	Total	6	76	

=== House of Representatives compositions ===
A two-party system has existed in the Australian House of Representatives since the two non-Labor parties merged in 1909 and continued with the creation of the Coalition in 1922. The 1910 election was the first to elect a majority government, with the Australian Labor Party concurrently winning the first Senate majority. Prior to 1909 a three-party system existed in the chamber. In 1919, the voting system changed from first-past-the-post to preferential voting. The two-party-preferred vote (2PP) has been commonly used since the 1970s to analyse how voting patterns relate to the seats won. ALP = Australian Labor Party, L+NP = grouping of Liberal/National/LNP/CLP Coalition parties (and predecessors), Oth = other parties and independents.

House of Representatives results
Election Year		Labor	Free Trade	Protectionist	Independent	Other parties		Total seats
1st	1901	14	28	31	2			75
Election Year		Labor	Free Trade	Protectionist	Independent	Other parties		Total seats
2nd	1903	23	25	26		1	Revenue Tariff	75
Election Year		Labor	Anti-Socialist	Protectionist	Independent	Other parties		Total seats
3rd	1906	26	26	21	1	1	Western Australian	75

	Primary vote			2PP vote		Seats			
Election	ALP	L+NP	Oth.	ALP	L+NP	ALP	L+NP	Oth.	Total
1901	19.4%	–	80.6% (Note: Protectionist (44.4%), Free Trade (34.2%), Independent Labor (0.6%), Others (2%))	–	–	14	–	61 (Note: Protectionist (31), Free Trade (28), Independent Labor (1), Other (1))	75
1903	31.0%	–	69% (Note: Protectionist (29.7%), Free Trade (34.4%), Others (5%))	–	–	23	–	52 (Note: Protectionist (26), Free Trade (25), Revenue Tariff (1))	75
1906	36.6%	–	63.4% (Note: Protectionist (16.4%), Anti-Socialists (38.2%), Others (8.7%))	–	–	26	–	49 (Note: Protectionist (16), Anti-Socialists (27), Others (6))	75
1910	50.0%	45.1%	4.9%	–	–	42	31	2	75
1913	48.5%	48.9%	2.6%	–	–	37	38	0	75
1914	50.9%	47.2%	1.9%	–	–	42	32	1	75
1917	43.9%	54.2%	1.9%	–	–	22	53	0	75
1919	42.5%	54.3%	3.2%	45.9%	54.1%	26	38	1	75
1922	42.3%	47.8%	9.9%	48.8%	51.2%	29	40	6	75
1925	45.0%	53.2%	1.8%	46.2%	53.8%	23	50	2	75
1928	44.7%	49.6%	5.8%	48.4%	51.6%	31	42	2	75
1929	48.8%	44.2%	7.0%	56.7%	43.3%	46	24	5	75
1931	37.8% (Note: 27.1% (ALP) + 10.6% (Lang Labor))	48.4%	24.5%	41.5%	58.5%	14	50	11	75
1934	41.2% (Note: 26.8% (ALP) + 14.4% (Lang Labor))	45.6%	27.6%	46.5%	53.5%	18	42	14	74
1937	43.1%	49.3%	7.5%	49.4%	50.6%	29	43	2	74
1940	40.1%	43.9%	15.9%	50.3%	49.7%	32	36	6	74
1943	49.9%	31.3%	18.6%	58.2%	41.8%	49	23	2	74
1946	49.7%	39.3%	11.0%	54.1%	45.9%	43	26	5	74
1949	46.0%	50.3%	3.7%	49.0%	51.0%	47	74	0	121
1951	47.7%	50.3%	2.1%	49.3%	50.7%	52	69	0	121
1954	50.1%	46.8%	3.2%	50.7%	49.3%	57	64	0	121
1955	44.7%	47.6%	7.8%	45.8%	54.2%	47	75	0	122
1958	42.9%	46.6%	10.6%	45.9%	54.1%	45	77	0	122
1961	48.0%	42.1%	10.0%	50.5%	49.5%	60	62	0	122
1963	45.5%	46.0%	8.5%	47.4%	52.6%	50	72	0	122
1966	40.0%	50.0%	10.0%	43.1%	56.9%	41	82	1	124
1969	47.0%	43.3%	9.7%	50.2%	49.8%	59	66	0	125
1972	49.6%	41.5%	8.9%	52.7%	47.3%	67	58	0	125
1974	49.3%	44.9%	5.8%	51.7%	48.3%	66	61	0	127
1975	42.8%	53.1%	4.1%	44.3%	55.7%	36	91	0	127
1977	39.6%	48.1%	12.2%	45.4%	54.6%	38	86	0	124
1980	45.1%	46.3%	8.5%	49.6%	50.4%	51	74	0	125
1983	59.5%	43.6%	6.9%	53.2%	46.8%	75	50	0	125
1984	47.5%	45.0%	7.4%	51.8%	48.2%	82	66	0	148
1987	45.8%	46.1%	8.1%	50.8%	49.2%	86	62	0	148
1990	39.4%	43.5%	17.1%	49.9%	50.1%	78	69	1	148
1993	44.9%	44.3%	10.7%	51.4%	48.6%	80	65	2	147
1996	38.8%	47.3%	14.0%	46.4%	53.6%	49	94	5	148
1998	40.1%	39.5%	20.4%	51.0%	49.0%	67	80	1	148
2001	37.8%	43.0%	19.2%	49.0%	51.0%	65	82	3	150
2004	37.6%	46.7%	15.7%	47.3%	52.7%	60	87	3	150
2007	43.4%	42.1%	14.5%	52.7%	47.3%	83	65	2	150
2010	38.0%	43.3%	18.7%	50.1%	49.9%	72	72	6	150
2013	33.4%	45.6%	21.0%	46.5%	53.5%	55	90	5	150
2016	34.7%	42.0%	23.3%	49.6%	50.4%	69	76	5	150
2019	33.3%	41.4%	25.2%	48.5%	51.5%	68	77	6	151
2022	32.6%	35.7%	31.7%	52.1%	47.9%	77	58	16	151
2025	34.6%	31.8%	33.6%	55.2%	44.8%	94	43	13	150

== See also ==
- 2025 Australian federal election
- Chronology of Australian federal parliaments
- Expansion of the Australian Parliament
- List of legislatures by country
- List of official openings by Elizabeth II in Australia
- Members of the Australian House of Representatives, 2025–2028
- Members of the Australian Senate, 2025–2028
- List of longest-serving members of the Parliament of Australia
