= Punter (surname) =

Punter is an occupational surname of English origin, denoting a keeper (toll-collector) of a bridge .

== People with the name ==
- Blaize Punter (born 1996), Antigua and Barbudan footballer
- Brian Punter (born 1935), English footballer
- David Punter (born 1949), English academic
- John Punter (born 1949), English record producer
- Kevin Punter (born 1993), American basketball player
- Steve Punter (born 1958), Canadian computer programmer

== See also ==
- Punt (surname)
- Punter (disambiguation)
