= Punter =

Punter may refer to:

== Personal roles ==
- Punter (card game), person who lays bets in a banking game
- Punter (gridiron football), a position in American and Canadian football
- Someone who uses a punt (boat)
- Client (prostitution), in British English
- Gambler, in Australian and New Zealand English and British English

== People ==
- Punter (surname)
- Punter Humphreys (1881–1949), English cricketer
- Ricky Ponting (born 1974), nicknamed Punter, Australian cricketer

== Other uses ==
- Punter (protocol), a file-transfer protocol
- Punternet, an escort rating service
- Punter's Politics, an Australian political commentary podcast and associated movement

== See also ==
- Punt (disambiguation)
- Punta (disambiguation)
