= Matter of public importance =

A matter of public importance (MPI) is a term used in the Australian Parliament where a subject is put forward for debate by the parliament. The opportunity is defined under standing order 75.

It can be put forward by a Senator in the Senate or a member of the House of Representatives. This must be supported by a certain number of Senators or Members before the discussion can begin. In the Australian Senate, five Senators are required to provide support by standing.

MPI's are often used by opposition parties to draw attention to government failures or areas that are politically sensitive for the government.

In 2007, the conservative Liberal-National coalition government signalled controversial changes the MPI procedure, formalizing speaking times and reducing the amount of time that independents have to speak. A single Senator is limited to 10 minutes discussion.
