= Pundt =

Pundt is a surname. Notable people with this surname include:

- Hermann Pundt (1928–2000), American architect
- Lockett Pundt (born 1982), American musician

== See also ==
- Punt (surname)
