= Punter's Politics =

Australian political podcast

- Podcast cover art
- Genre: Political commentary
- Country of origin: Australia

Cast and voices
- Hosted by: Konrad Benjamin

Related
- Website: punterspolitics.com

Punter's Politics is an Australian political commentary podcast and associated political movement with the goal of making Australian politics simpler for everyday people. The podcast was launched in June 2024 by former economics teacher Konrad Benjamin, and has since gained traction for exposing corporate influence in Australian politics.

Among other political issues, Benjamin has been particularly outspoken on the issue of taxation of exported Australian liquefied natural gas. He appeared in an April 2026 Senate Select Committee on Taxation of Gas Resources.
