= Australia's Voice =

Australian political party

- Abbreviation: AV
- Leader: Fatima Payman
- Founder: Fatima Payman
- Founded: 9 October 2024; 2 years ago
- Registered: 17 December 2024; 22 months ago
- Split from: Labor
- Ideology: Progressivism; Republicanism
- Colours: Maroon
- House of Representatives: 0 / 151
- Senate: 1 / 76

Website
- www.australiasvoice.com.au

Australia's Voice (AV) is an Australian political party founded in 2024 by independent and former Labor senator Fatima Payman. The party supports recognition of Palestinian statehood, as well as progressive policies. As of mid-2025, the party has run candidates in one federal election (in May 2025). None were successful in getting more than 1% of the primary vote.

== History ==
Party founder Fatima Payman was elected to the Senate in May 2022 on the Australian Labor Party (ALP) ticket for Western Australia. She sat with the party until resigning in July 2024 following her crossing the floor on a Senate resolution supporting Australian recognition of Palestinian statehood, and subsequent caucus suspension. She subsequently sat as an independent senator until 9 October 2024, when she announced the formation of Australia's Voice.

At a press conference launching the party, Payman stated that any elected AV MPs would be allowed conscience votes on any bill before parliament. When asked about where the party sits within the Overton window, Payman said: "The ideological spectrum of whether you sit on the left or right, this is not what we're talking about here. This is a party for all Australians. We're going to ensure that everyone is represented, whether it's the mums and dads who are trying to make ends meet, or the young students out there, or whether it's the grandparents who want to have, you know, dignity and respect as they age." Payman stated that the party would advocate for "progressive reform" on issues such as housing, education, taxation, and cost of living.

The choice of the party's name was criticised by multiple Indigenous Australian leaders on the grounds the party had appropriated the name from the proposed Aboriginal and Torres Strait Islander Voice, and had done so close to the anniversary (14 October) of the unsuccessful 2023 Australian Indigenous Voice referendum. Uluru Dialogue co-chair Megan Davis criticised the name and timing as "extraordinarily insensitive", Uphold and Recognise chair Sean Gordon criticised the name as a "further attempt by the pro-Palestinian movement to leverage off the back of Aboriginal and Torres Strait Islander people", and former Labor Senator Nova Peris stated the name "is breathtakingly disrespectful, and a complete misappropriation of yet another aspect of my people’s story and emblems". Payman stated she had consulted broadly with First Nations people about the name and that she would not be changing it. Payman also stated she was not concerned that the party name was similar to the defunct anti-Islam Australian Voice Party, which was associated with her chief of staff, Glenn Druery.

The party was officially registered with the Australian Electoral Commission on 17 December 2024.

Australia's Voice ran candidates for the Senate in each state (except for Tasmania) in the 2025 Australian federal election, none were successful in getting more than 1% of the vote. Its founder, Payman, was not up for election, as she is serving a term which expires in 2028.

In August 2025, Payman signalled her intention to rename the party after herself, stating the current party name was a factor in the party's performance at the election.

== Structure ==
According to the party constitution, it is governed by a National Executive Committee made up of a minimum of four office bearers and a Registered Officer who is currently Fatima Payman. The Registered Officer can overrule any decision made by the executive if it "threaten the integrity, survival or core values of the party". It is unclear how the Executives and Registered Officer are appointed. Candidates are selected by an undefined "democratic process involving members". Candidates must then be approved by the Executive and finally the Registered Officer. Policy is discussed at the state and territory levels with the Registered Officer having the final say.

== Policies ==
The party supports the immediate recognition of Palestinian statehood by Australia. It also supports progressive reform on housing, education, taxation, and cost of living. Australia's Voice also supports the abolishment of the Australian monarchy.
