= Punt (surname) =

Punt is a surname. Notable people with the surname include:

- Anita Punt (born 1987), New Zealand field hockey player
- Harald Punt (born 1952), Dutch rower
- Jos Punt (born 1946), Dutch bishop
- Piet Punt (1909–1973), Dutch footballer
- Steve Punt (born 1962), British comedian, of Punt and Dennis
- Terry L. Punt (1949–2009), American (Pennsylvanian) politician

== See also ==
- Pundt
