= Fatima Payman =

Australian politician (born 1995)

Senator Fatima Payman
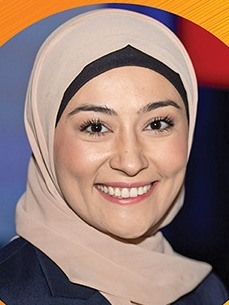
- Payman in 2022

Leader of Australia's Voice
- Incumbent
- Assumed office 9 October 2024
- Preceded by: Office established

Senator for Western Australia
- Incumbent
- Assumed office 1 July 2022

Personal details
- Born: 1995 (age 30–31) Kabul, Afghanistan
- Citizenship: Australia (2005–present); Afghanistan (de jure, see § 2022 election)
- Party: Australia's Voice (since 2024)
- Other political affiliations: Independent (2024); Labor (2014–2024)
- Spouse: Jacob Stokes (m. 2024)
- Education: University of Western Australia

Fatima Payman (Dari: فاطمه پیمان; born 1995) is an Australian politician who has served as a senator for Western Australia (WA) since 2022, first for the Labor Party and then as an independent, before launching her own political party – Australia's Voice – in October 2024.

Payman was born in Kabul, Afghanistan, and migrated to Perth with her family in 2003. She attended the Australian Islamic College and studied pharmacy at the University of Western Australia. Payman was president of Young Labor WA and an organiser for the United Workers Union, before becoming an electorate officer for WA Labor politician Pierre Yang. At the 2022 Australian federal election, Payman was elected to the Australian Senate as a senator for Western Australia. She was the fifth-youngest member to have been elected to the Senate and the first member of parliament to wear a hijab.

In May and June 2024, Payman's statements in support of Palestine during the Gaza war and criticism of the Albanese government's response to the war brought her out of step with the rest of her party. On 25 June 2024, Payman crossed the floor to support a Greens resolution to recognise a Palestinian state, leading to her being indefinitely suspended from the Labor caucus. On 4 July 2024, Payman quit the Labor Party to sit as an independent, and on 9 October 2024, she launched her own political party, Australia's Voice.

== Early life and education ==
Fatima Payman was born in Kabul, Afghanistan in 1995. She is of paternal Tajik heritage and her mother is Uzbek. Her maternal grandparents hailed from Uzbekistan. She is the daughter of Abdul Wakil Payman (d. 2018) and Shogufa Payman. She is the eldest of four children. Payman's grandfather was a member of parliament in Afghanistan.

Payman's family fled the Taliban for Pakistan when she was five years old. Her father arrived in Australia by boat in 1999 and spent time in immigration detention. He then worked as a security guard, kitchen hand and taxi driver, so he could afford to sponsor the migration of his wife and four children. The rest of the family arrived in Australia in 2003, when Fatima was eight, and settled in Perth. Once in Australia, her mother started a business giving driving lessons.

In 2013, Payman graduated as head girl from the Australian Islamic College in Perth. She attended the University of Western Australia, obtaining a Bachelor of Arts in Anthropology and Sociology and a Graduate Diploma of Pharmaceutical Science.

Payman worked as a pharmacy assistant and chemist at Terry White's from February 2018 until February 2020.

== Political career ==
Payman joined the United Workers Union (UWU) in 2018 as an organiser and was president of Young Labor WA, having been a member of the Labor Party since 2014. She recalled her observation of her father's experiences of workplace abuse and exploitation as a main motivation for joining the two organisations. She worked as electorate officer for Pierre Yang from 30 May 2019 to 23 December 2020.

=== 2022 election ===
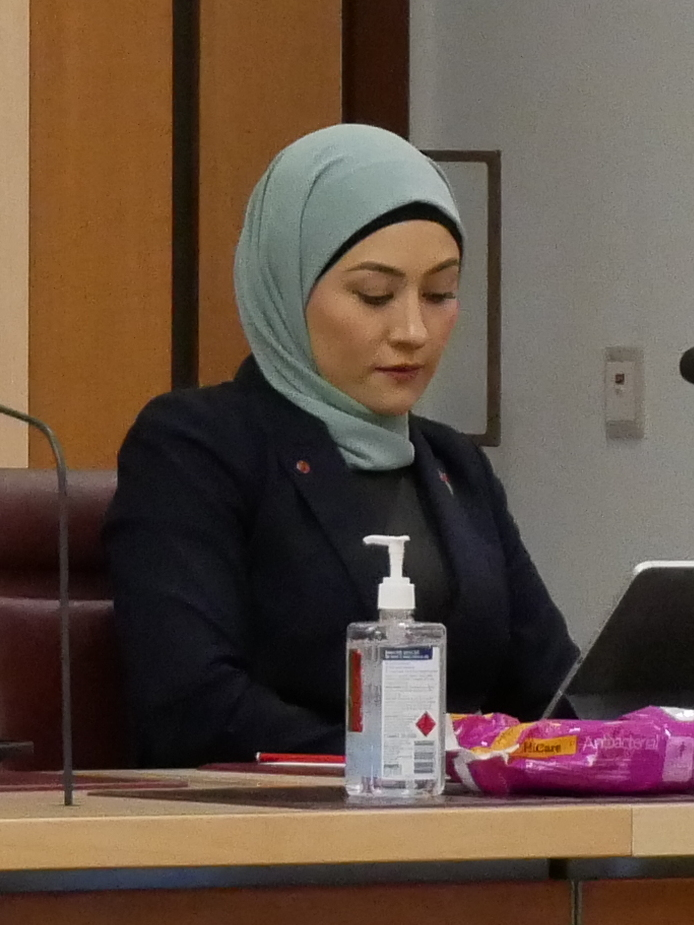
Payman in 2023

Payman was third on the Labor Party's Western Australian ticket for the Senate at the 2022 Australian federal election and was not expected to win a seat. She intended to use the 2022 election campaign as "practice" before seriously running in 2025.

Payman was naturalised as an Australian citizen in 2005, although this did not automatically revoke her Afghan citizenship according to Afghan law. The 1992 High Court ruling Sykes v Cleary in regards to Section 44 of the Constitution of Australia determined that a political candidate must take "all reasonable steps" to renounce other citizenships. Payman says she approached the Afghan embassy in Australia in October 2021 to renounce her Afghan citizenship, and that the embassy could not proceed with the formal process because it had no contact with the new Taliban government following the 2021 Taliban offensive. The Labor Party received legal advice that Payman was nevertheless still eligible to be elected, deeming that she had taken "all reasonable steps" to renounce her Afghan citizenship. She noted that the Afghan embassy in Australia did not know whether the departments and officers responsible for processing her application in Kabul even existed.

At the 2022 Australian federal election, Payman won the sixth and final Senate vacancy after a swing of 6.92% to Labor and a 9.24% swing against the Liberal party in Western Australian Senate voting. Her election was the first time the ALP won three Senate seats in WA since the Senate had been expanded in 1984. Elected at age 27, she is the third-youngest senator in Australian history and as of April 2025, the youngest-serving senator. Payman is also the first female member of parliament to wear a hijab. She has said her priorities include "getting more people from diverse backgrounds involved in politics, improving early childhood education, and climate change". She has also said she wants to "normalise hijab wearing".

On 4 December 2022, Payman was awarded "Australian Muslim Role Model of the Year" at the 15th Australian Muslim Achievement Awards at the Sydney Opera House.

=== Crossing the floor and move to the crossbench ===
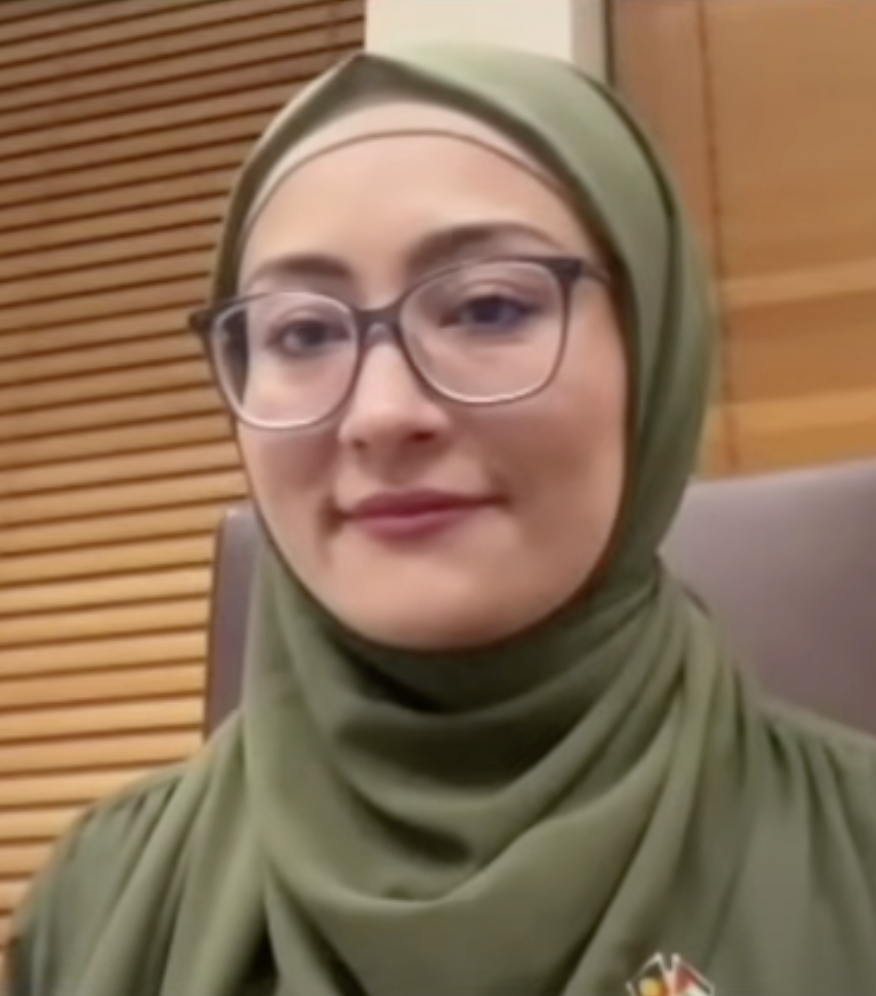
Payman in 2024

In a May 2024 speech to the Senate, Payman broke ranks with the Labor Party and accused Israel of committing genocide against Palestinians in the Gaza Strip, criticised the Australian Government for failing to sufficiently respond to Israel's war crimes in the Gaza war, and called for sanctions and divestment against Israel. Payman's speech was noted by The Guardian as a "significant rupture with the Labor party position". On 17 June 2024 Payman wrote an article in Al Jazeera English supportive of recognition of Palestine by Australia and argued "Such a move would support the peace efforts, not undermine them, as some have argued". On 25 June 2024, Payman crossed the floor to vote in favour of a resolution supporting Australian recognition of Palestinian statehood, voting with the crossbench against the government and opposition. Payman stated "My decision to cross the floor was the most difficult decision I have had to make". She then stepped down from two parliamentary foreign affairs committees and was suspended from caucus for the remainder of that parliamentary sitting week. Later, on 30 June 2024, Payman was suspended indefinitely from the Labor caucus after stating in an interview that she would cross the floor again if a similar resolution was before the Senate and can no longer participate in any parliamentary meetings of the caucus. Prime Minister and Labor Leader Anthony Albanese stated Payman could return if she "respect[ed] the caucus and members". On 1 July, Payman stated in a Facebook post that she had been "exiled" from the party, that she would abstain from voting in the Senate for the rest of the week, and that "some members are attempting to intimidate [her] into resigning from the Senate".

Payman received support for crossing the floor from the Labor Friends of Palestine, who stated Payman's actions were "entirely consistent with Labor principles and policy". The Australian National Imams Council and Australian Greens leader Adam Bandt both praised Payman's act as courageous. On 3 July 2024, the Leichhardt branch of the Labor Party, which is within Albanese's electorate of Grayndler, passed a motion supporting Payman. Five other Labor branches had also passed similar motions. Former Labor politician Harry Quick stated his admiration for Payman and urged her to not "bend or waver".

Minister for Foreign Affairs Penny Wong criticised Payman's decision, stating that party disagreements should be handled "internally", and that she herself (Penny Wong) had previously voted against same-sex marriage in keeping with party policy despite her own personal support of it. On 1 July 2024, Albanese said that Payman's actions had disrupted the government's messaging "the day before the most significant assistance that has been given to working people in a very long period of time", referring to the stage three tax cuts and energy bill relief which came into effect that day. Deputy Liberal leader Sussan Ley stated that Payman crossing the floor was a sign of Anthony Albanese's "weak leadership".

Labor MP Anne Aly, who had often disagreed with party positions regarding the Gaza conflict, said in an interview that she did not agree with Payman's approach. Referring to Payman's abstention on Labor's proposed amendment to a Greens motion calling for recognition of a Palestinian state, Aly said "I choose to do things in a way I think will make a material difference on the ground to people in Palestine. Fatima chooses to do it her way". Payman said her choice to abstain on Labor's amendment and to vote for the final Greens motion was consistent with Labor's platform which endorsed a two-state solution and made Palestinian recognition "an important priority". Aly said that Payman "could have voted for [the Labor amendment] if she held Labor values". Labor MP for Higgins, Michelle Ananda-Rajah, criticised Payman by saying that there had been "numerous opportunities" for Payman to raise her concerns internally.

On 4 July 2024, Payman quit the Labor Party to sit as an independent in the Senate. Independent senator Lidia Thorpe praised Payman as being on the "right side of history". Labor party president Wayne Swan stated that Payman's defection would "empower Labor's opponents on the far right". Upon returning to WA on 6 July, Payman was met by a cheering crowd of supporters at Perth Airport.

On 18 July, The Guardian reported two resignations among Multicultural Labor, a super-regional branch of WA Labor. The group's treasurer and vice-president had quit the Labor Party on 4 July "in protest" against the treatment of Fatima Payman. The resigning vice-president, Adam Demir, called the party a "spineless jellyfish".

=== Bankstown Hospital video ===
In February 2025, Payman commented on the reaction to a viral video involving two nurses from Bankstown-Lidcombe Hospital in Sydney. The video, recorded on a video-chat platform by an Israeli influencer, appeared to show the nurses making antisemitic remarks and stating they would refuse to treat, or would "kill," Israeli patients. Payman said that while the nurses' comments were "wrong" and that "no one should ever be denied medical care", the "intensity and uniformity" of the political and media response demonstrated a double standard compared to reactions to instances of Islamophobia or attacks against Palestinians.

=== Subsequent activities ===
In August 2024, Payman appointed political strategist Glenn Druery as her chief of staff.

In September 2024, Payman delivered a two-minute critique of government failure to accommodate young voters, who she believed feel "disenfranchised" by the two major parties. The speech gained notoriety due to its usage of slang words directed at the younger audiences of Generation Z and Generation Alpha, with Payman saying, "it is for this reason that I shall now render the remainder of my statement in a language they can understand". Payman used colloquialisms such as sigmas, goofy ahh, Ohio, gyatt, fanum tax, aura, capping/yapping, and skibidi. The speech was characterised as an example of "brainrot", a term for a certain style of Generation Alpha online content.

On 3 October 2024, Druery encouraged speculation that Payman would launch her own party, stating "watch this space". Albanese suggested that Payman should resign from the Senate, giving her seat to Labor, and contest the election with her new party instead of remaining to serve her full Senate term. Payman rejected this and suggested her new party could run a candidate in Albanese's electorate of Grayndler at the next federal election. On 9 October, Payman announced the creation of a new political party, Australia's Voice, and became its leader. In launching the party, Payman stated that Australia's Voice would be "a new political party for the disenfranchised, the unheard, and those yearning for real change", and that the ALP had "lost its way".

In November 2024, Payman clashed with Senator Pauline Hanson, accusing her of racism after she wanted Senator Payman to prove her eligibility to take a seat in the Senate under Section 44c of the Constitution. Hanson moved a proposal for there to be an investigation into Payman's eligibility for the Senate, claiming issues with her Afghan citizenship. The Senate voted down the investigation proposal 35–3.

In February 2025, Payman attended an International Women's Day event organised by the Benevolent Iranian Women's Association, which said it aimed "to provide factual information, first-hand experiences, and authentic observations about Iran, women in Iran, and expose the skewed and incomplete narrative represented in Western media". At the event, Payman spoke to Iranian state media outlet Press TV, during which she praised Iran for supposedly allowing women to participate in the workforce and have a voice as part of the democratic process. She dismissed Western criticism of Iran as propaganda. She was criticised for her comments, including by Australian United Solidarity for Iran, which accused Payman of aligning with the rhetoric of the Iranian government, which has been widely condemned for human rights abuses against women. Payman later apologised, stating her comments reflected experiences shared by others at the event and not her personal opinion, and stated she was unaware of Press TV's political affiliations. Siamak Ghahreman, president of the Australian Iranian Community Organisation, wrote to Home Affairs minister Tony Burke to request an investigation into whether Payman's remarks were influenced by foreign entities.

In May 2025, Payman reported a male Parliamentary colleague to the Parliamentary Workplace Support Service after alleged inappropriate comments at an official parliament social function.

Payman's party, Australia's Voice, ran candidates for the Senate at the May 2025 federal election; none received more than 1% of the primary vote. In August 2025, Payman suggested the name of the party had been a factor in the party's poor electoral performance, and signalled she would rename it after herself.

In October 2026, Payman cancelled an upcoming People's Bench event due to heightened safety concerns following the attack on Helen Haines. This occurred following Payman accusing the government on not acting on the requests of her and other MPs for safety. In a statement, Payman apologised to those planning to attend the event and said that her family and staff's security takes priority. The AFP was requested to police the event but declined.

== Other activities ==
Payman has worked as a program coordinator at the Edmund Rice Centre WA.

She was listed as a board member of the Australian Islamic College as of 2022.

== Personal life ==
In 2018, Payman's father died of leukaemia. Payman married Labor staffer Jacob Stokes in February 2024. Stokes resigned from his job, but not the party, following Payman's defection.

Payman is a Muslim. In January 2026, Payman announced she was pregnant with a girl.

== Sources ==
- Scott, Leisa; Rousset, Olivia; Powell, Robyn (19 August 2024). "Former Labor Senator Fatima Payman Defied Her Own Party and Crossed the Floor. Her Husband's Career Was Collateral Damage". ABC News.
- Grattan, Michelle (5 July 2024). "Labor's Fatima Payman Defects to Crossbench As Government Worries About Muslim Vote". ABC News.
