= Candidates of the 1970 Australian Senate election =

This article provides information on candidates who stood for the 1970 Australian Senate election. The election was held on 21 November 1970.

== Retiring Senators ==
=== Labor ===
- Senator Felix Dittmer (Qld)
- Senator Bert Hendrickson (Vic)
- Senator Pat Kennelly (Vic)
- Senator James Ormonde (NSW)
- Senator Clem Ridley (SA)
- Senator Jim Toohey (SA)

=== Liberal ===
- Senator George Branson (WA)
- Senator Sir Alister McMullin (NSW)
- Senator Malcolm Scott (WA)
- Senator Dame Ivy Wedgwood (Vic)

=== Country ===
- Senator Douglas Scott (NSW)

== Senate ==
Sitting Senators are shown in bold text. Tickets that elected at least one Senator are highlighted in the relevant colour. Successful candidates are identified by an asterisk (*).

=== New South Wales ===
Six seats were up for election. One of these was a short-term vacancy caused by Country Party Senator Colin McKellar's death; this was held in the interim by Douglas Scott. The Labor Party was defending two seats. The Liberal-Country Coalition was defending four seats. Senators Bob Cotton (Liberal), Joe Fitzgerald (Labor), Doug McClelland (Labor) and Lionel Murphy (Labor) were not up for re-election.

Labor candidates	Coalition candidates	DLP candidates	Australia candidates	Democratic candidates	NSP candidates
1. **Tony Mulvihill***; 2. Jim McClelland*; 3. Arthur Gietzelt*	1. **Sir Kenneth Anderson*** (Lib); 2. John Carrick* (Lib); 3. **Tom Bull** (CP)	1. Jack Kane*; 2. Peter Keogh; 3. Jan Van Der Rijt	1. Diana Ward; 2. Gordon Barton; 3. George Black	1. Dick Bourke; 2. George Matchett	1. John Stewart; 2. Michael McCormick
PPA candidates	Ungrouped candidates				
1. Sidney Sheedy; 2. Wendy Reed	Brian Kilby				

=== Queensland ===
Five seats were up for election. The Labor Party was defending two seats. The Liberal-Country Coalition was defending two seats. The Democratic Labor Party was defending one seat. Senators Condon Byrne (Democratic Labor), George Georges (Labor), Ron Maunsell (Country), Bertie Milliner (Labor) and Dame Annabelle Rankin (Liberal) were not up for re-election.

Labor candidates	Coalition candidates	DLP candidates	NSP candidates	PPA candidates	Ungrouped candidates
1. **Jim Keeffe***; 2. Ron McAuliffe*; 3. Mal Colston	1. **Ian Wood*** (Lib); 2. **Ellis Lawrie*** (CP); 3. Neville Bonner (Lib)	1. **Vince Gair***; 2. Jack Williams; 3. Brian O'Brien	1. Ken Gibbett; 2. Kevin Thompson	1. Harold Asmith; 2. Gary Cowburn; 3. Arthur Marshall	Jean Reville

=== South Australia ===
Five seats were up for election. The Labor Party was defending four seats. The Liberal Party was defending one seat. Senators Reg Bishop (Labor), Nancy Buttfield (Liberal), Jim Cavanagh (Labor), Condor Laucke (Liberal) and Harold Young (Liberal) were not up for re-election.

Labor candidates	Liberal candidates	DLP candidates	Australia candidates	BEC candidates
1. **Arnold Drury***; 2. **Don Cameron***; 3. Geoff McLaren*	1. **Gordon Davidson***; 2. Don Jessop*; 3. Martin Cameron	1. Mark Posa; 2. George Basisovs	1. Colin Lawton; 2. Patrick Gethin; 3. Carl Nilsson	1. Bob Harris; 2. Laures Chester

=== Tasmania ===
Five seats were up for election. The Labor Party was defending three seats. The Liberal Party was defending two seats. Senators Bob Poke (Labor), Peter Rae (Liberal), Reg Turnbull (Independent), Ken Wriedt (Labor) and Reg Wright (Liberal) were not up for re-election.

Labor candidates	Liberal candidates	DLP candidates	Ungrouped candidates
1. **Justin O'Byrne***; 2. **Don Devitt***; 3. **Bert Lacey**	1. **John Marriott***; 2. **Elliot Lillico***; 3. David Gunn	1. Michael Delaney; 2. Dudley McNamara	Brian Broadby; Thomas McDonald; Charles Matysek; Michael Townley*; Peter Wood; Walter Crispin

=== Victoria ===
Six seats were up for election. One of these was a short-term vacancy caused by Labor Senator Sam Cohen's death; this had been filled in the interim by Bill Brown. The Labor Party was defending three seats. The Liberal Party was defending two seats. The Democratic Labor Party was defending one seat. Senators Sir Magnus Cormack (Liberal), Jack Little (Democratic Labor), George Poyser (Labor) and James Webster (Country) were not up for re-election.

Labor candidates	Liberal candidates	DLP candidates	Australia candidates	DOGS candidates	NSP candidates
1. **Bill Brown***; 2. Cyril Primmer*; 3. Cyril Sudholz	1. **Ivor Greenwood***; 2. Margaret Guilfoyle*; 3. George Hannan*	1. **Frank McManus***; 2. Frank Dowling; 3. Jim Marmion	1. Ted Hamilton; 2. Dorothy Buchanan; 3. Frederick Wyke	1. Ray Nilsen; 2. Lance Hutchinson; 3. Jeffrey Davis	1. Cass Young; 2. Katrina Young
Group B candidates	Ungrouped candidates				
1. Linden Cameron; 2. Robert McCosh	George Samargis; Joe Schillani; Morris Revelman; Fred Farrall; Walter Wilson; Edward Birley				

=== Western Australia ===
Five seats were up for election. The Labor Party was defending two seats. The Liberal Party was defending two seats. The Country Party was defending one seat. Senators Edgar Prowse (Country), Peter Sim (Liberal), Don Willesee (Labor), Laurie Wilkinson (Labor) and Reg Withers (Liberal) were not up for re-election.

Labor candidates	Liberal candidates	Country candidates	DLP candidates	CIM candidates	Group C candidates
1. **John Wheeldon***; 2. **Harry Cant***; 3. Mal Bryce	1. Peter Durack*; 2. Jim Samson; 3. Margaret McAleer	1. **Tom Drake-Brockman***; 2. June Bunce; 3. Terry McDonnell	1. John Martyr; 2. George Gaunt	1. David Smith; 2. Eric Langhorn	1. Syd Negus*; 2. Olga Negus

== Summary by party ==
Beside each party is an indication of whether the party contested the Senate election in each state.

Party	NSW	Vic	Qld	WA	SA	Tas	Total
Australian Labor Party	*	*	*	*	*	*	6
Liberal Party of Australia	*	*	*	*	*	*	6
Australian Country Party	*		*	*			3
Democratic Labor Party	*	*	*	*	*	*	6
Australia Party	*	*			*		3
National Socialist Party of Australia	*	*	*				3
Pensioner Power Association of Australia	*		*				2
Democratic Party of Australia	*						1
Defence of Government Schools		*					1
Conservative Immigration Movement				*			1
Better Education Committee					*		1

== See also ==
- 1970 Australian Senate election
- Members of the Australian Senate, 1968–1971
- Members of the Australian Senate, 1971–1974
- List of political parties in Australia
