= Members of the Australian Senate, 1968–1971 =

Senate composition at 1 July 1968
Government (29) - (2 seat minority)
Liberal (23) (Note: At the October 1969 House of Representatives election Liberal Senator Martin Cameron was defeated for a casual vacancy by Labor candidate Don Cameron.)
Country Party (6) (Note: At the November 1970 half Senate election Country Party Senator Douglas Scott was defeated for a casual vacancy by DLP candidate Jack Kane.)

Opposition (26)
Labor (26) (Note: At the November 1970 half Senate election Labor Senator Bill Brown was defeated for a casual vacancy by Liberal candidate George Hannan.)

Crossbench (5)
DLP (4)
Independents (1)

Changes in composition

This is a list of members of the Australian Senate from 1968 to 1971. Half of its members were elected at the 5 December 1964 half Senate election and had terms due to finish on 30 June 1971; the other half were elected at 25 November 1967 half Senate election and had terms due to finish on 30 June 1974. The process for filling casual vacancies was complex. While senators were elected for a six-year term, people appointed to a casual vacancy only held office until the earlier of the next election for the House of Representatives or the Senate.

Senator	Party	State	Term ending	Years in office
Ken Anderson	Liberal	New South Wales	1971	1953–1975
Reg Bishop	Labor	South Australia	1974	1961–1981
George Branson	Liberal	Western Australia	1971	1958–1971
Bill Brown (Note: Labor Senator Sam Cohen died on 7 October 1969; Labor member Bill Brown was appointed to fill the ensuing vacancy on 19 November but he was defeated for the seat at the November 1970 half Senate election by Liberal candidate George Hannan to complete the term until 30 June 1974.)	Labor	Victoria	1970 (Note: Appointed to a casual vacancy and only held office until the earlier of the next election for the House of Representatives or the Senate.)	1969–1970, 1971–1978
Tom Bull	Country	New South Wales	1971	1965–1971
Nancy Buttfield	Liberal	South Australia	1974	1955–1965, 1968–1974
Condon Byrne	Democratic Labor	Queensland	1974	1951–1959, 1968–1974
Don Cameron (Note: Liberal Senator Keith Laught died on 13 May 1969; Liberal member Martin Cameron was appointed to fill the ensuing vacancy on 23 May but he was defeated for the seat at the October 1969 House of Representatives election by Labor candidate Don Cameron to complete the term until 30 June 1971.)	Labor	South Australia	1971	1969–1978
Martin Cameron	Liberal	South Australia	1969	1969
Harry Cant	Labor	Western Australia	1971	1959–1974
Jim Cavanagh	Labor	South Australia	1974	1961–1981
Sam Cohen	Labor	Victoria	1974	1962–1969
Sir Magnus Cormack	Liberal	Victoria	1974	1951–1953, 1962–1978
Bob Cotton	Liberal	New South Wales	1974	1965–1978
Gordon Davidson	Liberal	South Australia	1971	1961, 1962, 1965–1981
Don Devitt	Labor	Tasmania	1971	1965–1978
Felix Dittmer	Labor	Queensland	1971	1959–1971
Tom Drake-Brockman	Country	Western Australia	1971	1958, 1959–1978
Arnold Drury	Labor	South Australia	1971	1959–1975
Joe Fitzgerald	Labor	New South Wales	1974	1962–1974
Vince Gair	Democratic Labor	Queensland	1971	1965–1974
George Georges	Labor	Queensland	1974	1967–1987
Ivor Greenwood (Note: Liberal Senator John Gorton resigned from the Senate on 1 February 1968. Liberal member Ivor Greenwood was appointed to fill the ensuing Senate vacancy on 21 February until a special election at the October 1969 House of Representatives election, when he was elected to complete the term until 30 June 1971.)	Liberal	Victoria	1971	1968–1976
George Hannan	Liberal	Victoria	1974	1956–1965, 1970–1974
Bert Hendrickson (Note: Father of the Senate)	Labor	Victoria	1971	1947–1971
Jack Kane (Note: Country Party Senator Colin McKellar died on 13 April 1970; Country Party member Douglas Scott was appointed to fill the ensuing vacancy on 6 August but he was defeated for the seat at the November 1970 half Senate election by DLP candidate Jack Kane to complete the term until 30 June 1974.)	Democratic Labor	New South Wales	1974	1970–1974
Jim Keeffe	Labor	Queensland	1971	1964–1983
Pat Kennelly	Labor	Victoria	1971	1953–1971
Bert Lacey	Labor	Tasmania	1971	1965–1971
Condor Laucke	Liberal	South Australia	1974	1967–1981
Keith Laught	Liberal	South Australia	1971	1951–1969
Ellis Lawrie	Liberal	Queensland	1971	1965–1975
Elliot Lillico	Liberal	Tasmania	1971	1959–1974
Jack Little	Democratic Labor	Victoria	1974	1968–1974
John Marriott	Liberal	Tasmania	1971	1953–1975
Ron Maunsell	Country	Queensland	1974	1967–1981
Doug McClelland	Labor	New South Wales	1974	1961–1987
Jim McClelland (Note: Labor Senator James Ormonde died on 30 November 1970; Labor member Jim McClelland was appointed to fill the ensuing vacancy on 16 March to complete the term until 30 June 1971. McClelland had been elected to the Senate at the 1970 election for a term from 1 July 1971 to 30 June 1977)	Labor	New South Wales	1971	1970–1978
Colin McKellar	Country	New South Wales	1974	1958–1970
Frank McManus	Democratic Labor	Victoria	1971	1956–1962, 1965–1974
Alister McMullin	Liberal	New South Wales	1971	1951–1971
Bertie Milliner	Labor	Queensland	1974	1968–1975
Tony Mulvihill	Labor	New South Wales	1971	1964–1983
Lionel Murphy	Labor	New South Wales	1974	1962–1975
Justin O'Byrne	Labor	Tasmania	1971	1947–1981
James Ormonde	Labor	New South Wales	1971	1958, 1959–1970
Bob Poke	Labor	Tasmania	1974	1956–1974
George Poyser	Labor	Victoria	1974	1966–1975
Edgar Prowse	Country	Western Australia	1974	1962–1973
Peter Rae	Liberal	Tasmania	1974	1968–1986
Dame Annabelle Rankin	Liberal	Queensland	1974	1947–1971
Clem Ridley	Labor	South Australia	1971	1959–1971
Douglas Scott	Country	New South Wales	1970	1970, 1974–1985
Malcolm Scott	Liberal	Western Australia	1971	1950–1971
Peter Sim	Liberal	Western Australia	1974	1964–1981
Jim Toohey	Labor	South Australia	1971	1953–1971
Reg Turnbull	Independent	Tasmania	1974	1962–1974
James Webster	Country	Victoria	1974	1964–1981
Dame Ivy Wedgwood	Liberal	Victoria	1971	1950–1971
John Wheeldon	Labor	Western Australia	1971	1964–1981
Laurie Wilkinson	Labor	Western Australia	1974	1966–1974
Don Willesee	Labor	Western Australia	1974	1950–1975
Reg Withers	Liberal	Western Australia	1974	1966, 1967–1987
Ian Wood	Liberal	Queensland	1971	1950–1978
Ken Wriedt	Labor	Tasmania	1974	1964–1980
Reg Wright	Liberal	Tasmania	1974	1950–1978
Harold Young	Liberal	South Australia	1974	1968–1981
