= Candidates of the 1967 Australian Senate election =

This article provides information on candidates who stood for the 1967 Australian Senate election. The election was held on 25 November 1967.

== Retiring Senators ==
=== Labor ===
- Senator Archie Benn (Qld)
- Senator Nick McKenna (Tas)
- Senator Theo Nicholls (SA)

=== Liberal ===
- Senator Marie Breen (Vic)
- Senator Denham Henty (Tas)
- Senator Ted Mattner (SA)
- Senator Kenneth Morris (Qld)

=== Country ===
- Senator Sir Walter Cooper (Qld)

== Senate ==
Sitting Senators are shown in bold text. Tickets that elected at least one Senator are highlighted in the relevant colour. Successful candidates are identified by an asterisk (*).

=== New South Wales ===
Five seats were up for election. The Labor Party was defending three seats. The Liberal-Country Coalition was defending two seats. Senators Ken Anderson (Liberal), Tom Bull (Country), Sir Alister McMullin (Liberal), Tony Mulvihill (Labor) and James Ormonde (Labor) were not up for re-election.

Labor candidates	Coalition candidates	DLP candidates	ARM candidates	Communist candidates	Ungrouped candidates
1. **Doug McClelland***; 2. **Lionel Murphy***; 3. **Joe Fitzgerald***	1. **Bob Cotton*** (Lib); 2. **Colin McKellar*** (CP); 3. David Arblaster (Lib)	1. Jack Kane; 2. Jan Van Der Rijt; 3. Michael Fitzpatrick	1. Gordon Barton; 2. Ken Thomas; 3. Paul Allsop; 4. Peter Mason; 5. Harry Seidler	1. Harry Hatfield; 2. Barbara Curthoys	John Wall; Lillian Muir

=== Queensland ===
Five seats were up for election. The Labor Party was defending one seat. The Liberal-Country Coalition was defending four seats. Senators Felix Dittmer (Labor), Vince Gair (Democratic Labor), Jim Keeffe (Labor), Ellis Lawrie (Country) and Ian Wood (Liberal) were not up for re-election.

Labor candidates	Coalition candidates	DLP candidates
1. Bertie Milliner*; 2. George Georges*; 3. Ron McAuliffe	1. **Dame Annabelle Rankin*** (Lib); 2. Ron Maunsell* (CP); 3. **Bill Heatley** (Lib)	1. Condon Byrne*; 2. Rogers Judge; 3. Brian O'Brien

=== South Australia ===
Five seats were up for election. The Labor Party was defending three seats. The Liberal Party was defending two seats. Senators Gordon Davidson (Liberal), Arnold Drury (Labor), Keith Laught (Liberal), Clem Ridley (Labor) and Jim Toohey (Labor) were not up for re-election.

Labor candidates	Liberal candidates	DLP candidates	Communist candidates	Ungrouped candidates
1. **Reg Bishop***; 2. **Jim Cavanagh***; 3. Robert Nielsen	1. **Condor Laucke***; 2. Nancy Buttfield*; 3. Harold Young*	1. Mark Posa; 2. Patrick Coffey	1. Alan Finger; 2. Hal Alexander	Denis McEvoy

=== Tasmania ===
Five seats were up for election. The Labor Party was defending two seats. The Liberal Party was defending two seats. Independent Senator Reg Turnbull was defending one seat. Senators Don Devitt (Labor), Bert Lacey (Labor), Elliot Lillico (Liberal), John Marriott (Liberal) and Justin O'Byrne (Labor) were not up for re-election.

Labor candidates	Liberal candidates	DLP candidates	Ungrouped candidates
1. **Bob Poke***; 2. Ken Wriedt*; 3. Ray Sherry	1. **Reg Wright***; 2. Peter Rae*; 3. Geoffrey Lemprière	1. George Cole; 2. Kenneth Bennet; 3. Richard Delany	Bill Wedd; **Reg Turnbull***

=== Victoria ===
Five seats were up for election. The Labor Party was defending two seats. The Liberal-Country Coalition was defending three seats. Senators John Gorton (Liberal), Bert Hendrickson (Labor), Pat Kennelly (Labor), Frank McManus (Democratic Labor) and Dame Ivy Wedgwood (Liberal) were not up for re-election.

Labor candidates	Coalition candidates	DLP candidates	ARM candidates	Communist candidates	Ungrouped candidates
1. **Sam Cohen***; 2. **George Poyser***; 3. Cyril Primmer	1. **Magnus Cormack*** (Lib); 2. **James Webster*** (CP); 3. George Hannan (Lib)	1. Jack Little*; 2. Frank Dowling; 3. Bob Joshua	1. Jim Vickers-Willis; 2. Leonard Weber	1. Ralph Gibson; 2. Vic Williams	Alan Milne; George Brunning

=== Western Australia ===
Five seats were up for election. The Labor Party was defending three seats. The Liberal Party was defending one seat. The Country Party was defending one seat. Senators George Branson (Liberal), Harry Cant (Labor), Tom Drake-Brockman (Country), Malcolm Scott (Liberal) and John Wheeldon (Labor) were not up for re-election.

Labor candidates	Liberal candidates	Country candidates	DLP candidates	Ungrouped candidates
1. **Don Willesee***; 2. **Laurie Wilkinson***; 3. **Dorothy Tangney**	1. **Peter Sim***; 2. Reg Withers*; 3. Victor Garland	1. **Edgar Prowse***; 2. Stephen Errington; 3. Ernest Twine	1. Frank Pownall; 2. John Martyr	Frederick Simpson

== Summary by party ==
Beside each party is an indication of whether the party contested the Senate election in each state.

Party	NSW	Vic	Qld	WA	SA	Tas	Total
Australian Labor Party	*	*	*	*	*	*	6
Liberal Party of Australia	*	*	*	*	*	*	6
Australian Country Party	*	*	*	*			4
Democratic Labor Party	*	*	*	*	*	*	6
Communist Party of Australia	*	*			*		3
Australian Reform Movement	*	*					2

== See also ==
- 1967 Australian Senate election
- Members of the Australian Senate, 1965–1968
- Members of the Australian Senate, 1968–1971
- List of political parties in Australia
