= Candidates of the 1964 Australian Senate election =

This article provides information on candidates who stood for the 1964 Australian Senate election. The election was held on 5 December 1964.

== Retiring senators ==
=== Labor ===
- Senator Stan Amour (NSW)
- Senator James Arnold (NSW)
- Senator Bill Aylett (Tas)
- Senator Gordon Brown (Qld)

=== Liberal ===
- Senator Roy Kendall (Qld)

=== Country ===
- Senator Ted Maher (Qld)

== Senate ==
Sitting senators are shown in bold text. Tickets that elected at least one senator are highlighted in the relevant colour. Successful candidates are identified by an asterisk (*).

=== New South Wales ===
Five seats were up for election. The Labor Party was defending three seats. The Liberal-Country Coalition was defending two seats. Senators Joe Fitzgerald (Labor), Doug McClelland (Labor), Colin McKellar (Country), Lionel Murphy (Labor) and Sir William Spooner (Liberal) were not up for re-election.

Labor candidates	Coalition candidates	DLP candidates	Communist candidates	Group D candidates	Ungrouped candidates
1. **James Ormonde***; 2. Tony Mulvihill*; 3. Les Haylen	1. **Sir Alister McMullin*** (Lib); 2. **Ken Anderson*** (Lib); 3. Tom Bull* (CP)	1. Jack Kane; 2. Jan Van Der Rijt; 3. Colin MacNaught	1. Pat Clancy; 2. Barbara Curthoys; 3. Les Kelton	1. Ronald Sarina; 2. Norman Ericson; 3. John Wyllie	Ronald Batey

=== Queensland ===
Five seats were up for election. The Labor Party was defending two seats. The Liberal-Country Coalition was defending three seats. Senators Archie Benn (Labor), Sir Walter Cooper (Country), Kenneth Morris (Liberal), Dame Annabelle Rankin (Liberal) and Bob Sherrington (Liberal) were not up for re-election.

Labor candidates	Coalition candidates	DLP candidates	Communist candidates	Group D candidates	Group F candidates
1. **Felix Dittmer***; 2. Jim Keeffe*; 3. George Whiteside	1. **Ian Wood*** (Lib); 2. Ellis Lawrie* (CP); 3. Ron Witham (Lib)	1. Vince Gair*; 2. Jack Williams; 3. Anne Wenck	1. Claude Jones; 2. Pat Pastourel; 3. Frank Bishop	1. Christopher Melville; 2. Paul Kenealy	1. Patrick Curtis; 2. Frederick Thomas

=== South Australia ===
Five seats were up for election. The Labor Party was defending three seats. The Liberal Party was defending two seats. Senators Reg Bishop (Labor), Jim Cavanagh (Labor), Clive Hannaford (Liberal), Ted Mattner (Liberal) and Theo Nicholls (Labor) were not up for re-election.

Labor candidates	Liberal candidates	DLP candidates	Communist candidates	Group C candidates	Ungrouped candidates
1. **Jim Toohey***; 2. **Clem Ridley***; 3. **Arnold Drury***	1. **Keith Laught***; 2. Gordon Davidson*; 3. **Nancy Buttfield**	1. Charles Coffey; 2. Brian Nash; 3. George Basisovs	1. Alan Finger; 2. Hal Alexander; 3. Beryl Miller	1. Marcus Dodd; 2. Brian Waters	Joseph Pertl

=== Tasmania ===
Five seats were up for election. The Labor Party was defending two seats. The Liberal Party was defending two seats. The Democratic Labor Party was defending one seat. Senators Denham Henty (Liberal), Nick McKenna (Labor), Bob Poke (Labor), Reg Turnbull (Independent) and Reg Wright (Liberal) were not up for re-election.

Labor candidates	Liberal candidates	DLP candidates	Ungrouped candidates
1. Don Devitt*; 2. **Justin O'Byrne***; 3. Bert Lacey*	1. **Elliot Lillico***; 2. **John Marriott***; 3. Geoffrey Lemprière	1. **George Cole**; 2. Harold Senior; 3. Alastair Davidson	Max Bound (CPA)

=== Victoria ===
Five seats were up for election. The Labor Party was defending two seats. The Liberal Party was defending three seats. Senators Marie Breen (Liberal), Sam Cohen (Labor), Magnus Cormack (Liberal), Charles Sandford (Labor) and Harrie Wade (Country) were not up for re-election.

Labor candidates	Liberal candidates	DLP candidates	Communist candidates	Group B candidates	Group F candidates	Ungrouped candidates
1. **Pat Kennelly***; 2. **Bert Hendrickson***; 3. Cyril Sudholz	1. **John Gorton***; 2. **Ivy Wedgwood***; 3. **George Hannan**	1. Frank McManus*; 2. Jack Little; 3. Bob Joshua	1. Ralph Gibson; 2. Agnes Doig; 3. Barrie Blears	1. John Murray; 2. Frances Murray	1. James Davies; 2. Godfrey Gauci	Leslie Rubinstein; John Dunstan; Louis Cole; Robert Parry

=== Western Australia ===
Five seats were up for election. The Labor Party was defending two seats. The Liberal Party was defending two seats. The Country Party was defending one seat. Senators Shane Paltridge (Liberal), Edgar Prowse (Country), Dorothy Tangney (Labor), Seddon Vincent (Liberal) and Don Willesee (Labor) were not up for re-election.

Labor candidates	Liberal candidates	Country candidates	DLP candidates	Communist candidates
1. **Harry Cant***; 2. John Wheeldon*; 3. **Joe Cooke**	1. **Malcolm Scott***; 2. **George Branson***; 3. Hugh Halbert	1. **Tom Drake-Brockman***; 2. Jessie Robertson; 3. Ray McPharlin	1. Bernard Flanagan; 2. Frank Pownall; 3. Francis Dwyer	1. Jack Marks; 2. Joan Williams; 3. John Gandini

== Summary by party ==
Beside each party is an indication of whether the party contested the Senate election in each state.

Party	NSW	Vic	Qld	WA	SA	Tas	Total
Australian Labor Party	*	*	*	*	*	*	6
Liberal Party of Australia	*	*	*	*	*	*	6
Australian Country Party	*		*	*			3
Democratic Labor Party	*	*	*	*	*	*	6
Communist Party of Australia	*	*	*	*	*	*	6

== See also ==
- 1964 Australian Senate election
- Members of the Australian Senate, 1962–1965
- Members of the Australian Senate, 1965–1968
- List of political parties in Australia
