= Members of the Australian Senate, 1971–1974 =

Senate composition at 1 July 1971
Coalition (26) - (5 seat minority) (Note: The Coalition government was defeated by Labor at the December 1972 House of Representatives election)
Liberal (22)
Country Party (4)

Labor (26) - (5 seat minority)

Crossbench (8)
Democratic Labour (5)
Independents (3)

Notes

This is a list of members of the Australian Senate from 1971 to 1974. Half of its members were elected at the 25 November 1967 half Senate election and had terms due to finish on 30 June 1974; the other half were elected at the 21 November 1970 half Senate election and had terms due to finish on 30 June 1977. In fact, the term for all of them was terminated by the double dissolution for the 18 May 1974 election.

The government changed during the Senate term as the election cycles of the Senate and the House of Representatives had been out of synchronisation since 1963 and the Coalition government, led by Prime Minister William McMahon, was defeated by the Labor Party, led by Gough Whitlam, at the December 1972 House of Representatives election.

== Members ==
Senator	Party	State	Term ending	Years in office
Ken Anderson	Liberal	New South Wales	1977	1953–1975
Reg Bishop	Labor	South Australia	1974	1961–1981
Neville Bonner (Note: First Indigenous Australian to be a member of the Parliament of Australia) (Note: Liberal Party Senator Dame Annabelle Rankin resigned on 24 May 1971; Liberal Party Neville Bonner was appointed to fill the ensuing vacancy on 11 June 1971 until a special election at the December 1972 House of Representatives election, when he was elected to complete the term until 30 June 1974.)	Liberal	Queensland	1972, (Note: Appointed to a casual vacancy and only held office until the earlier of the next election for the House of Representatives or the Senate.) 1974	1971–1983
Bill Brown	Labor	Victoria	1977	1969–1970, 1971–1978
Nancy Buttfield	Liberal	South Australia	1974	1955–1965, 1968–1974
Condon Byrne	Democratic Labour	Queensland	1974	1951–1959, 1968–1974
Don Cameron	Labor	South Australia	1977	1969–1978
Harry Cant	Labor	Western Australia	1977	1959–1974
John Carrick	Liberal	New South Wales	1977	1971–1987
Jim Cavanagh	Labor	South Australia	1974	1961–1981
Sir Magnus Cormack	Liberal	Victoria	1974	1951–1953, 1962–1978
Bob Cotton	Liberal	New South Wales	1974	1965–1978
Gordon Davidson	Liberal	South Australia	1977	1961, 1962, 1965–1981
Don Devitt	Labor	Tasmania	1977	1965–1978
Tom Drake-Brockman	Country	Western Australia	1977	1958, 1959–1978
Arnold Drury	Labor	South Australia	1977	1959–1975
Peter Durack	Liberal	Western Australia	1977	1971–1993
Joe Fitzgerald	Labor	New South Wales	1974	1962–1974
Vince Gair	Democratic Labour	Queensland	1977	1965–1974
George Georges	Labor	Queensland	1974	1967–1987
Arthur Gietzelt	Labor	New South Wales	1977	1971–1989
Ivor Greenwood	Liberal	Victoria	1977	1968–1976
Margaret Guilfoyle	Liberal	Victoria	1977	1971–1987
George Hannan (Note: Hannan resigned from the Liberal Party on 20 March 1974 to form the National Liberal Party in protest at the Liberals' perceived social liberalism.)	Liberal/National Liberal	Victoria	1974	1956–1965, 1970–1974
Don Jessop	Liberal	South Australia	1977	1971–1991
Jack Kane	Democratic Labour	New South Wales	1974	1970–1974
Jim Keeffe	Labor	Queensland	1977	1964–1983
Sir Condor Laucke	Liberal	South Australia	1974	1967–1981
Ellis Lawrie	Liberal	Queensland	1977	1965–1975
Elliot Lillico	Liberal	Tasmania	1977	1959–1974
Jack Little	Democratic Labour	Victoria	1974	1968–1974
John Marriott	Liberal	Tasmania	1977	1953–1975
Ron Maunsell	Country	Queensland	1974	1967–1981
Ron McAuliffe	Labor	Queensland	1977	1971–1981
Doug McClelland	Labor	New South Wales	1974	1961–1987
Jim McClelland	Labor	New South Wales	1977	1971–1978
Geoff McLaren	Labor	South Australia	1977	1971–1983
Frank McManus	Democratic Labour	Victoria	1977	1956–1962, 1965–1974
Bertie Milliner	Labor	Queensland	1974	1968–1975
Tony Mulvihill	Labor	New South Wales	1977	1964–1983
Lionel Murphy	Labor	New South Wales	1974	1962–1975
Syd Negus	Independent	Western Australia	1977	1971–1974
Justin O'Byrne (Note: Father of the Senate)	Labor	Tasmania	1977	1947–1981
Bob Poke	Labor	Tasmania	1974	1956–1974
George Poyser	Labor	Victoria	1974	1966–1975
Cyril Primmer	Labor	Victoria	1977	1971–1985
Edgar Prowse (Note: Country Party Senator Edgar Prowse resigned on 31 December 1973; Country Party member David Reid was appointed to fill the ensuing vacancy on 16 January 1974 to complete the term until 30 June 1974.)	Country	Western Australia	1974	1962–1973
Peter Rae	Liberal	Tasmania	1974	1967–1986
David Reid	Country	Western Australia	1974	1974
Peter Sim	Liberal	Western Australia	1974	1964–1981
Michael Townley	Independent	Tasmania	1977	1971–1987
Reg Turnbull	Independent	Tasmania	1974	1962–1974
James Webster	Country	Victoria	1974	1964–1981
John Wheeldon	Labor	Western Australia	1977	1964–1981
Laurie Wilkinson	Labor	Western Australia	1974	1966–1974
Don Willesee	Labor	Western Australia	1974	1950–1975
Reg Withers	Liberal	Western Australia	1974	1966, 1967–1987
Ian Wood	Liberal	Queensland	1977	1950–1978
Ken Wriedt	Labor	Tasmania	1974	1964–1980
Reg Wright	Liberal	Tasmania	1974	1950–1978
Harold Young	Liberal	South Australia	1974	1968–1981

== Bibliography ==
- Journal of the Senate. Parliament of Australia. 1974.
- "Members of the Senate since 1901". Parliamentary Handbook. Parliament of Australia. Archived from the original on 25 July 2008.
