= Members of the Australian Senate, 1962–1965 =

Senate composition at 1 July 1962
Government (30) - (1 seat minority) (Note: At the November 1963 House of Representatives election Labor Senator George Whiteside was defeated for a casual vacancy by Liberal candidate Kenneth Morris, giving the Government a majority in the Senate.)
Liberal (24)
Country Party (6)

Opposition (28)
Labor (28)

Crossbench (2)
DLP (1)
Independents (1)

Changes in composition

This is a list of members of the Australian Senate from 1962 to 1965. Half of its members were elected at the 22 November 1958 election and had terms starting on 1 July 1959 and finishing on 30 June 1965; the other half were elected at the 9 December 1961 election and had terms starting on 1 July 1962 and finishing on 30 June 1968. The process for filling casual vacancies was complex. While senators were elected for a six-year term, people appointed to a casual vacancy only held office until the earlier of the next election for the House of Representatives or the Senate.

Senator	Party	State	Term ending	Years in office
Stan Amour	Labor	New South Wales	1965	1938–1965
Ken Anderson	Liberal	New South Wales	1965	1953–1975
James Arnold	Labor	New South Wales	1965	1941–1965
Bill Aylett	Labor	Tasmania	1965	1938–1965
Archie Benn	Labor	Queensland	1968	1950–1968
Reg Bishop	Labor	South Australia	1968	1962–1981
George Branson	Liberal	Western Australia	1965	1958–1971
Marie Breen	Liberal	Victoria	1968	1962–1968
Gordon Brown (Note: Father of the Senate)	Labor	Queensland	1965	1932–1965
Nancy Buttfield	Liberal	South Australia	1965	1955–1965, 1968–1974
Harry Cant	Labor	Western Australia	1965	1959–1974
Jim Cavanagh	Labor	South Australia	1968	1962–1981
Sam Cohen	Labor	Victoria	1968	1962–1969
George Cole	Democratic Labor	Tasmania	1965	1950–1965
Joe Cooke	Labor	Western Australia	1965	1947–1951, 1952–1965
Walter Cooper	Country	Queensland	1968	1928–1932, 1935–1968
Magnus Cormack	Liberal	Victoria	1968	1951–1953, 1962–1978
Felix Dittmer	Labor	Queensland	1965	1959–1971
Tom Drake-Brockman	Country	Western Australia	1965	1958, 1959–1978
Arnold Drury	Labor	South Australia	1965	1959–1975
Joe Fitzgerald	Labor	New South Wales	1968	1962–1974
John Gorton	Liberal	Victoria	1965	1950–1968
Clive Hannaford	Liberal	South Australia	1968	1950–1967
George Hannan	Liberal	Victoria	1965	1956–1965, 1970–1974
Bert Hendrickson	Labor	Victoria	1965	1947–1971
Denham Henty	Liberal	Tasmania	1968	1950–1968
Roy Kendall	Liberal	Queensland	1965	1950–1965
Pat Kennelly	Labor	Victoria	1965	1953–1971
Keith Laught	Liberal	South Australia	1965	1951–1969
Elliot Lillico	Liberal	Tasmania	1965	1959–1974
Ted Maher	Country	Queensland	1965	1950–1965
John Marriott	Liberal	Tasmania	1965	1953–1975
Ted Mattner	Liberal	South Australia	1968	1944–1946, 1950–1968
Doug McClelland	Labor	New South Wales	1968	1962–1987
Colin McKellar	Country	New South Wales	1968	1958–1970
Nick McKenna	Labor	Tasmania	1968	1944–1968
Alister McMullin	Liberal	New South Wales	1965	1951–1971
Kenneth Morris (Note: Labor Senator Max Poulter died on 2 September 1962; Labor member George Whiteside was appointed to fill the ensuing vacancy on 9 October but he was defeated for the seat at the November 1963 House of Representatives election by Liberal candidate Kenneth Morris.)	Liberal	Queensland	1968	1963–1968
Lionel Murphy	Labor	New South Wales	1968	1962–1975
Theo Nicholls	Labor	South Australia	1968	1944–1968
Justin O'Byrne	Labor	Tasmania	1965	1947–1981
James Ormonde	Labor	New South Wales	1965	1958, 1959–1970
Shane Paltridge	Liberal	Western Australia	1968	1951–1966
Bob Poke	Labor	Tasmania	1968	1956–1974
Max Poulter	Labor	Queensland	1968	1962
Edgar Prowse	Country	Western Australia	1968	1962–1973
Dame Annabelle Rankin	Liberal	Queensland	1968	1947–1971
Clem Ridley	Labor	South Australia	1965	1959–1971
Charles Sandford	Labor	Victoria	1968	1947–1956, 1957–1966
Malcolm Scott	Liberal	Western Australia	1965	1950–1971
Bob Sherrington	Liberal	Queensland	1968	1962–1966
Peter Sim (Note: Liberal Party Senator Seddon Vincent died on 9 November 1964; Liberal Party member Peter Sim was appointed to fill the ensuing vacancy on 26 November until a special election at the November 1966 House of Representatives election, when he was elected to complete the term until 30 June 1968.)	Liberal	Western Australia	1964, (Note: Appointed to a casual vacancy and only held office until the earlier of the next election for the House of Representatives or the Senate.) 1968	1964–1981
Bill Spooner	Liberal	New South Wales	1968	1950–1965
Dame Dorothy Tangney	Labor	Western Australia	1968	1943–1968
Jim Toohey	Labor	South Australia	1965	1953–1971
Reg Turnbull	Independent	Tasmania	1968	1962–1974
Seddon Vincent	Liberal	Western Australia	1968	1950–1964
Harrie Wade (Note: Country Party Senator Harrie Wade died on 18 November 1964; Country Party member James Webster was appointed to fill the ensuing vacancy on 9 December until a special election at the November 1966 House of Representatives election, when he was elected to complete the term until 30 June 1968.)	Country	Victoria	1968	1956–1964
James Webster	Country	Victoria	1966, 1968	1964–1981
Dame Ivy Wedgwood	Liberal	Victoria	1965	1950–1971
George Whiteside	Labor	Queensland	1963	1962–1963
Don Willesee	Labor	Western Australia	1968	1950–1975
Ian Wood	Liberal	Queensland	1965	1950–1978
Reg Wright	Liberal	Tasmania	1968	1950–1978
