= Members of the Australian Senate, 1959–1962 =

Senate composition at 1 July 1959
Government (32) - (1 seat majority)
Liberal (25)
Country Party (7)

Opposition (26)
Labor (26)

Crossbench (2)
DLP (2)

This is a list of members of the Australian Senate from 1959 to 1962. Half of its members were elected at the 10 December 1955 election and had terms starting on 1 July 1956 and finishing on 30 June 1962; the other half were elected at the 22 November 1958 election and had terms starting on 1 July 1959 and finishing on 30 June 1965. The process for filling casual vacancies was complex. While senators were elected for a six-year term, people appointed to a casual vacancy only held office until the earlier of the next election for the House of Representatives or the Senate.

Senator	Party	State	Term ending	Years in office
Stan Amour	Labor	New South Wales	1965	1938–1965
Ken Anderson	Liberal	New South Wales	1965	1953–1975
John Armstrong	Labor	New South Wales	1962	1938–1962
James Arnold	Labor	New South Wales	1965	1941–1965
Bill Aylett	Labor	Tasmania	1965	1938–1965
Archie Benn	Labor	Queensland	1962	1950–1968
George Branson	Liberal	Western Australia	1965	1958–1971
Gordon Brown (Note: Father of the Senate)	Labor	Queensland	1965	1932–1965
Nancy Buttfield (Note: Liberal Senator Rex Pearson died on 11 September 1961; Liberal member Gordon Davidson was appointed to fill the ensuing vacancy on 28 September. He did not stand at the 9 December 1961 election and his position was won by Liberal candidate Nancy Buttfield. In order to take up the seat with a term finishing on 30 June 1965, Buttfield resigned her pre-existing seat won at the 1955 election and scheduled to expire on 30 June 1962; Davidson was appointed to that position on 8 February 1962.)	Liberal	South Australia	1962, 1965	1955–1965, 1968–1974
Don Cameron	Labor	Victoria	1962	1938–1962
Harry Cant	Labor	Western Australia	1965	1959–1974
George Cole	Democratic Labor	Tasmania	1965	1950–1965
Joe Cooke	Labor	Western Australia	1965	1947–1951, 1952–1965
Walter Cooper	Country	Queensland	1962	1928–1932, 1935–1968
Ben Courtice	Labor	Queensland	1962	1937–1962
Gordon Davidson	Liberal	South Australia	1961, (Note: Appointed to a casual vacancy and only held office until the earlier of the next election for the House of Representatives or the Senate.) 1962	1961, 1962, 1965–1981
Felix Dittmer	Labor	Queensland	1965	1959–1971
Tom Drake-Brockman	Country	Western Australia	1965	1958, 1959–1978
Arnold Drury	Labor	South Australia	1965	1959–1975
John Gorton	Liberal	Victoria	1965	1950–1968
Clive Hannaford	Liberal	South Australia	1962	1950–1967
George Hannan	Liberal	Victoria	1965	1956–1965, 1970–1974
Bert Hendrickson	Labor	Victoria	1965	1947–1971
Denham Henty	Liberal	Tasmania	1962	1950–1968
Roy Kendall	Liberal	Queensland	1965	1950–1965
Pat Kennelly	Labor	Victoria	1965	1953–1971
Keith Laught	Liberal	South Australia	1965	1951–1969
Elliot Lillico	Liberal	Tasmania	1965	1959–1974
Ted Maher	Country	Queensland	1965	1950–1965
John Marriott	Liberal	Tasmania	1965	1953–1975
Ted Mattner	Liberal	South Australia	1962	1944–1946, 1950–1968
John McCallum	Liberal	New South Wales	1962	1950–1962
Colin McKellar	Country	New South Wales	1962	1958–1970
Nick McKenna	Labor	Tasmania	1962	1944–1968
Frank McManus	Democratic Labor	Victoria	1962	1956–1962, 1965–1974
Alister McMullin	Liberal	New South Wales	1965	1951–1971
Theo Nicholls	Labor	South Australia	1962	1944–1968
Justin O'Byrne	Labor	Tasmania	1965	1947–1981
Sid O'Flaherty	Labor	South Australia	1962	1944–1962
James Ormonde	Labor	New South Wales	1965	1958, 1959–1970
Neil O'Sullivan	Liberal	Queensland	1962	1947–1962
Shane Paltridge	Liberal	Western Australia	1962	1951–1966
Rex Pearson	Liberal	South Australia	1965	1951–1961
Bob Poke	Labor	Tasmania	1962	1956–1974
Dame Annabelle Rankin	Liberal	Queensland	1962	1947–1971
Albert Reid	Country	New South Wales	1962	1950–1962
Clem Ridley	Labor	South Australia	1965	1959–1971
Agnes Robertson	Country	Western Australia	1962	1950–1962
Charles Sandford	Labor	Victoria	1962	1947–1956, 1957–1966
Malcolm Scott	Liberal	Western Australia	1965	1950–1971
Jim Sheehan	Labor	Victoria	1962	1938–1940, 1944–1962
Bill Spooner	Liberal	New South Wales	1962	1950–1965
Dame Dorothy Tangney	Labor	Western Australia	1962	1943–1968
Jim Toohey	Labor	South Australia	1965	1953–1971
Seddon Vincent	Liberal	Western Australia	1962	1950–1964
Harrie Wade	Country	Victoria	1962	1956–1964
Robert Wardlaw	Liberal	Tasmania	1962	1953–1962
Dame Ivy Wedgwood	Liberal	Victoria	1965	1950–1971
Don Willesee	Labor	Western Australia	1962	1950–1975
Ian Wood	Liberal	Queensland	1965	1950–1978
Reg Wright	Liberal	Tasmania	1962	1950–1978
