= Members of the Australian Senate, 1956–1959 =

Senate composition at 1 July 1956
Government (30) - (1 seat minority) (Note: At the November 1958 election Labor senator James Ormonde was elected to a full term seat, from 1 July 1959 to 30 June 1965 and Country Party candidate Colin McKellar was elected to fill the casual vacancy ending on 30 June 1962, giving the government a majority in the Senate.)
Liberal (24)
Country Party (6) (Note: At the November 1958 election Country Party Senator Tom Drake-Brockman was elected to a full term from 1 July 1959 to 30 June 1965 and Liberal candidate George Branson was elected to fill the balance of the casual vacancy ending on 30 June 1959.)

Opposition (28)
Labor (28) (Note: Condon Byrne split from the Labor Party in 1957, joining the Queensland Labor Party.)

Crossbench (2)
ALP (Anti-Communist)/DLP (2) (Note: The Australian Labor Party (Anti-Communist) changed its name to the Democratic Labour Party in 1957.)

Changes in composition

This is a list of members of the Australian Senate from 1956 to 1959. Half of its members were elected at the 9 May 1953 election and had terms starting on 1 July 1953 and finishing on 30 June 1959; the other half were elected at the 10 December 1955 election and had terms starting on 1 July 1956 and finishing on 30 June 1962. The process for filling casual vacancies was complex. While senators were elected for a six-year term, people appointed to a casual vacancy only held office until the earlier of the next election for the House of Representatives or the Senate.

Senator	Party	State	Term ending	Years in office
Stan Amour	Labor	New South Wales	1959	1938–1965
Ken Anderson	Liberal	New South Wales	1959	1953–1975
John Armstrong	Labor	New South Wales	1962	1938–1962
James Arnold	Labor	New South Wales	1959	1941–1965
Bill Ashley (Note: Labor Senator Bill Ashley died on 27 June 1958; Labor member James Ormonde was appointed to fill the ensuing vacancy on 30 July, expiring at the November 1958 election. At the 1958 election, Ormonde was elected to a full term seat, from 1 July 1959 to 30 June 1965 and Country Party candidate Colin McKellar was elected to fill the casual vacancy ending on 30 June 1962.)	Labor	New South Wales	1962	1938–1958
Bill Aylett	Labor	Tasmania	1959	1938–1965
Archie Benn	Labor	Queensland	1962	1950–1968
George Branson (Note: Country Party Senator Harrie Seward died on 23 July 1958; Country Party member Tom Drake-Brockman was appointed to fill the ensuing vacancy on 12 August, expiring at the November 1958 election. Liberal candidate George Branson was elected to fill the balance of the casual vacancy ending on 30 June 1959. Drake-Brockman was elected to a full term from 1 July 1959 to 30 June 1965.)	Liberal	Western Australia	1959	1958–1971
Gordon Brown (Note: Father of the Senate)	Labor	Queensland	1959	1932–1965
Nancy Buttfield	Liberal	South Australia	1962	1955–1965, 1968–1974
Condon Byrne	Labor/Queensland Labor (Note: Condon Byrne split from the Labor Party in 1957, joining the Queensland Labor Party.)	Queensland	1959	1951–1959, 1968–1974
Don Cameron	Labor	Victoria	1962	1938–1962
George Cole	Labor (A-C)/Democratic Labor (Note: The Australian Labor Party (Anti-Communist) changed its name to the Democratic Labour Party in 1957.)	Tasmania	1959	1950–1965
Joe Cooke	Labor	Western Australia	1959	1947–1951, 1952–1965
Walter Cooper	Country	Queensland	1962	1928–1932, 1935–1968
Ben Courtice	Labor	Queensland	1962	1937–1962
Jack Critchley	Labor	South Australia	1959	1947–1959
Jack Devlin (Note: Labor Senator Jack Devlin died on 26 May 1957; former Labor Senator Charles Sandford was appointed to fill the ensuing vacancy on 6 June, expiring at the November 1958 election, when he was elected to fill the balance of the vacancy ending on 30 June 1962.)	Labor	Victoria	1959	1946–1957
Tom Drake-Brockman	Country	Western Australia	1958 (Note: Appointed to a casual vacancy and only held office until the earlier of the next election for the House of Representatives or the Senate.)	1958, 1959–1978
James Fraser	Labor	Western Australia	1959	1938–1959
John Gorton	Liberal	Victoria	1959	1950–1968
Donald Grant	Labor	New South Wales	1959	1944–1959
Clive Hannaford	Liberal	South Australia	1962	1950–1967
George Hannan (Note: Liberal Senator John Spicer resigned on 13 August 1956 to be appointed to the Commonwealth Industrial Court; Liberal member George Hannan was appointed to fill the ensuing vacancy on 28 August, expiring at the November 1958 election, when he was elected to fill the balance of the vacancy ending on 30 June 1962.)	Liberal	Victoria	1958	1956–1965, 1970–1974
John Harris	Labor	Western Australia	1959	1947–1951, 1953–1959
Bert Hendrickson	Labor	Victoria	1959	1947–1971
Denham Henty	Liberal	Tasmania	1962	1950–1968
Roy Kendall	Liberal	Queensland	1959	1950–1965
Pat Kennelly	Labor	Victoria	1959	1953–1971
Keith Laught	Liberal	South Australia	1959	1951–1969
Ted Maher	Country	Queensland	1959	1950–1965
John Marriott	Liberal	Tasmania	1959	1953–1975
Ted Mattner	Liberal	South Australia	1962	1944–1946, 1950–1968
John McCallum	Liberal	New South Wales	1962	1950–1962
Colin McKellar	Country	New South Wales	1962	1958–1970
Nick McKenna	Labor	Tasmania	1962	1944–1968
Frank McManus	Labor (A-C)/Democratic Labor	Victoria	1962	1956–1962, 1965–1974
Alister McMullin	Liberal	New South Wales	1959	1951–1971
Theo Nicholls	Labor	South Australia	1962	1944–1968
Justin O'Byrne	Labor	Tasmania	1959	1947–1981
Sid O'Flaherty	Labor	South Australia	1962	1944–1962
James Ormonde	Labor	New South Wales	1958	1958, 1959–1970
Neil O'Sullivan	Liberal	Queensland	1962	1947–1962
Shane Paltridge	Liberal	Western Australia	1962	1951–1966
Rex Pearson	Liberal	South Australia	1959	1951–1961
Bob Poke	Labor	Tasmania	1962	1956–1974
Dame Annabelle Rankin	Liberal	Queensland	1962	1947–1971
Albert Reid	Country	New South Wales	1962	1950–1962
Agnes Robertson	Country	Western Australia	1962	1950–1962
John Ryan	Labor	South Australia	1959	1950–1959
Charles Sandford	Labor	Victoria	1958, 1962	1947–1956, 1957–1966
Malcolm Scott	Liberal	Western Australia	1959	1950–1971
Harrie Seward	Country	Western Australia	1959	1951–1958
Jim Sheehan	Labor	Victoria	1962	1938–1940, 1944–1962
John Spicer	Liberal	Victoria	1962	1940–1944, 1950–1956
Bill Spooner	Liberal	New South Wales	1962	1950–1965
Dame Dorothy Tangney	Labor	Western Australia	1962	1943–1968
Jim Toohey	Labor	South Australia	1959	1953–1971
Seddon Vincent	Liberal	Western Australia	1962	1950–1964
Harrie Wade	Country	Victoria	1962	1956–1964
Robert Wardlaw	Liberal	Tasmania	1962	1953–1962
Dame Ivy Wedgwood	Liberal	Victoria	1959	1950–1971
Don Willesee	Labor	Western Australia	1962	1950–1975
Ian Wood	Liberal	Queensland	1959	1950–1978
Robert Wordsworth	Liberal	Tasmania	1959	1950–1959
Reg Wright	Liberal	Tasmania	1962	1950–1978
