= Sudholz =

Sudholz is a German surname.

People with this name include:

- Cyril Sudholz, politician who contested various elections, including as a Labor candidate for the Australian Senate in 1970
- Johann Sudholz (J. W. A. Sudholz; 1821–1903) pioneer German colonist and Australian politician
- John Sudholz (born 1946), Australian rules footballer
- Judy Sudholz, politician in Western Australia who stood for the Citizens Electoral Council in the 2016 Australian federal election, and earlier elections
- Maxwell Sudholz, Australian para-cyclist
- Reg Sudholz, top goalkicker in the Wangaratta Football Club in 1939
