= Douglas Scott (politician) =

Australian politician

The Honourable Douglas Scott
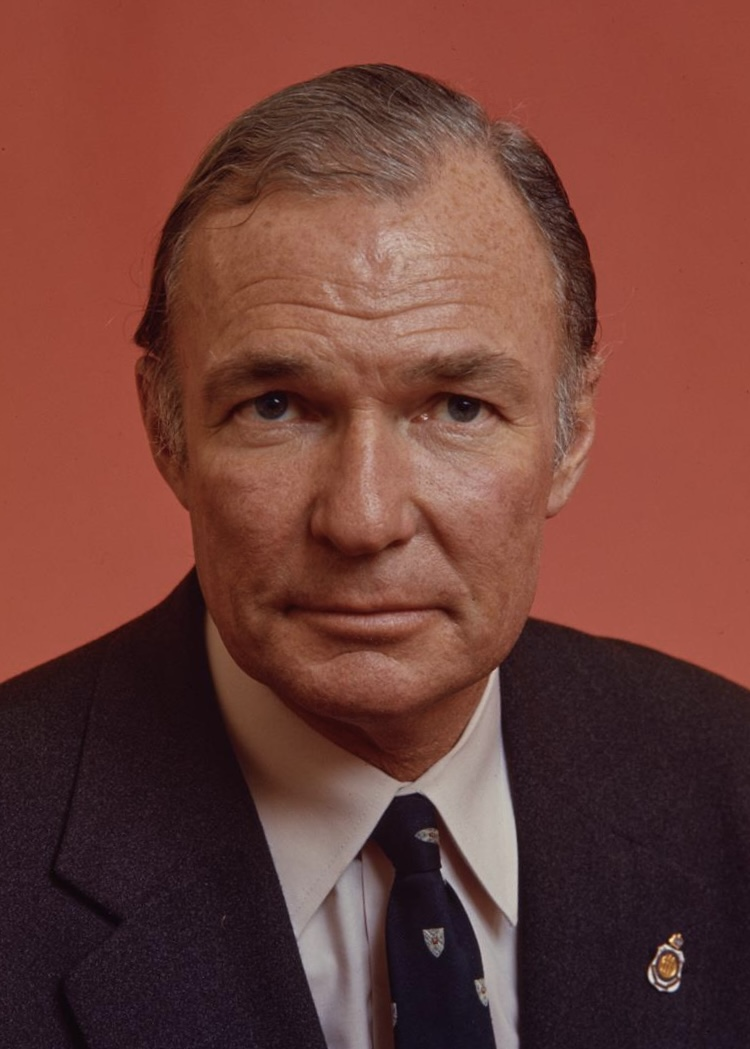
- Scott in 1974

Minister for Special Trade Representations
- In office 8 December 1979 – 19 August 1980
- Prime Minister: Malcolm Fraser
- Preceded by: Victor Garland
- Succeeded by: Ian Sinclair

Senator for New South Wales
- In office 6 August 1970 – 20 November 1970
- Preceded by: Colin McKellar
- Succeeded by: Jack Kane
- In office 18 May 1974 – 30 June 1985
- Preceded by: Jack Kane

Personal details
- Born: 12 May 1920 Prospect, South Australia, Australia
- Died: 12 March 2012 (aged 91) Forbes, New South Wales, Australia
- Party: National
- Spouse: Pamela McLean (m. 1948)
- Education: University of Sydney
- Occupation: Grazier

Douglas Barr Scott (12 May 1920 – 12 March 2012) was an Australian politician. He was a Senator for New South Wales from 1974 to 1985 and also briefly filled a casual vacancy in 1970. He was Minister for Special Trade Representations in the Fraser government from 1979 to 1980. He was a member of the National Party – earlier known as the Country Party and National Country Party – and was his party's Senate leader from 1980 to 1985.

== Early life ==
Scott was born on 12 May 1920 in Prospect, South Australia. He was the son of Clara Josephine (née White) and James Barr Scott.

Scott spent his early years on his father's sheep and wheat property "Glenview" near Grenfell, New South Wales. He was educated via correspondence until the age of nine, when his family moved to Adelaide to live with his maternal grandparents. Scott attended Scotch College, Adelaide, for seven years including two years as a boarder. He was the top South Australian student in Latin in 1938 and, after briefly returning to Grenfell to work on the family property, matriculated to the University of Sydney in 1939, studying a combined arts-law degree.

Scott was a member of the Royal Australian Naval Volunteer Reserve and interrupted his university studies to serve in the military during World War II. He was promoted lieutenant in 1943 and served onshore at HMAS Moreton and HMAS Kuttabul. He later served on the New Guinea campaign before being discharged in October 1945.

After the war's end, Scott returned to the University of Sydney and graduated Bachelor of Arts in 1946 with majors in economic and history. He returned to manage the family property at Grenfell and was active in the Farmers' and Settlers' Association of New South Wales.

== Politics ==
Scott joined the Country Party in the 1950s and soon became chairman of the party's Grenfell branch. He later served on the party's state council and state executive.

On 6 August 1970, Scott was elected by the parliament of New South Wales to fill the casual vacancy caused by the death of Country Party senator Colin McKellar. He chose not to recontest the vacancy at the 1970 Senate election to aid the chances of incumbent Country Party senator Tom Bull, running on third position on the Coalition ticket. His first term consequently ended on 20 November 1970, with Democratic Labor Party candidate Jack Kane defeating Bull for the final vacancy.

Scott was re-endorsed by the Country Party in 1973 and at the 1974 federal election was elected to a six-year term beginning on 1 July 1974. His term was cut short by a double dissolution, but he was re-elected to further terms at the 1975, 1980 and 1983 elections. He chose not to recontest his seat at the 1984 election, with his term ending on 30 June 1985.

== Personal life ==
In 1948, Scott married Pamela McLean, with whom he had two children. After leaving the Senate he retired to his property near Grenfell. He died on 12 March 2012 in Forbes, New South Wales, aged 91.

== Notes ==
Political offices
Preceded by Victor Garland	Minister for Special Trade Representations; 1979–1980	Succeeded by Ian Sinclair
