= Jim Vickers-Willis =

Australian journalist

- Born: 16 July 1918
- Died: 30 December 2008 (aged 90)
- Occupations: Square dance caller, author

Jim Vickers-Willis (16 July 1918 – 30 December 2008) was a popular Australian journalist and square dance caller in the 1950s. He was also an author of a best selling book and a campaigner for social change.

== Biography ==
The son of John Vickers-Willis by his second wife Mildred Amelia, the daughter of journalist Horace Whitcomb, James Vickers-Willis was born in Mill Hill, England, and migrated to Australia with his parents at the age of seven. He was educated in Melbourne at Brighton Grammar School and Haileybury after the family moved to Australia in 1925. He had an elder sister and a younger brother, as well as two older half-brothers from his father's first marriage.

He worked as a cadet journalist for the Sun Herald, Melbourne, and during World War II served as an RAAF instructor and Spitfire pilot. Embarking on a new career, he became the most popular square dance caller of the day, and at one stage one of Australia's highest paid entertainers. At the age of 36 he contracted polio. This ended his career as a square dance caller and this signalled the end of the square dance boom. The doctors gave him around 5 to 10 years to live but he defied medical opinion and lived for another 50 plus years.

In addition to being a square dance caller he was also an avid nudist. Vickers-Willis and his wife Beth (née Parkinson) were regulars at the River Valley Nudist Holiday Resort near Echuca.

He was an Australian Senate candidate in 1967.

=== Later years ===
Along with his wife Beth, he was featured in a broadcast of Retirement Home on the ABC, having been interviewed by ABC reporter Alex Tarney. He died aged 90.

== Organisations and memberships ==
- Quality Of Life Association (President)

== Political ==
Vickers-Willis was a member of the Australian Reform Movement. When he ran as a Senate candidate for Victoria in the 1967 Australian Senate election, his election platform was "Vote Us Out Of Vietnam".

== Publications ==
- The Magic Of Life ISBN 1-921030-76-3
- Are You (really) Fun To Live With?
- The Australian Standard Square Dance
- The War Diary
