= Don Cameron (South Australian politician) =

Australian politician

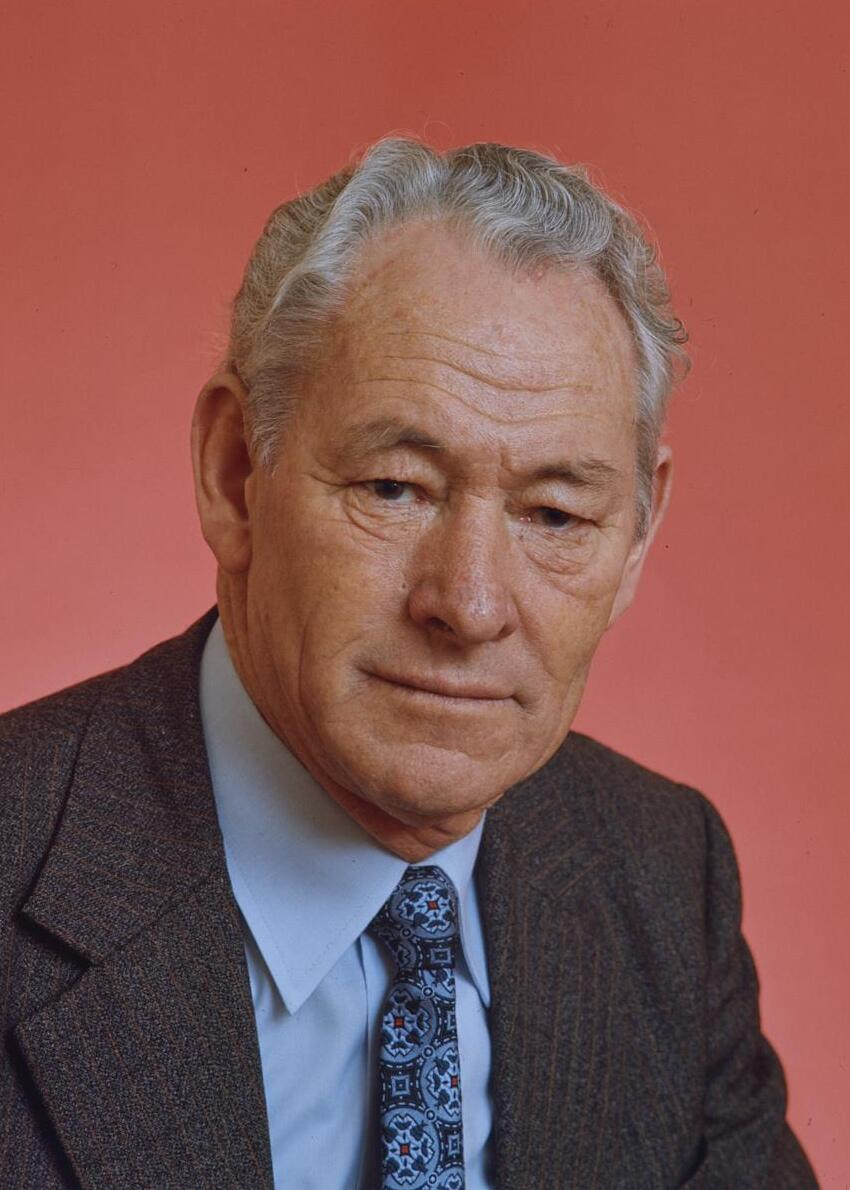
- Cameron in 1974

Senator for South Australia
- In office 25 October 1969 – 30 June 1978
- Preceded by: Martin Cameron

Personal details
- Born: 13 January 1914 Murray Bridge, South Australia
- Died: 5 June 1998 (aged 84) Adelaide, South Australia
- Party: Labor
- Relations: Clyde Cameron (brother)
- Occupation: Shearer, trade unionist

Donald Newton Cameron (13 January 1914 – 5 June 1998), Australian politician, was born in Murray Bridge, South Australia, and was educated at Gawler. Like his brother Clyde Cameron, he became a shearer and an official of the Australian Workers' Union, and was also active in the Australian Labor Party. From 1965 to 1969 he was South Australian state secretary of the AWU and a member of the Labor State Executive. He was elected to the Australian Senate in 1969 and served until his retirement in 1978.

== Early life ==
Cameron was born on 13 January 1914 in Murray Bridge, South Australia. He was the second of four sons born to Adelaide (née Hilder) and Robert Cameron. His father worked as a shearer and dairyman, while his mother was a squatter's daughter.

Cameron grew up in McLaren Vale and Loos, briefly attending Gawler High School before leaving school to work as a shearer. He was close with his brother Clyde and the two lived together in New Zealand from 1938 to 1939. They later both became officials with the Australian Workers' Union (AWU), with Clyde becoming state secretary in 1941.

== Personal life ==
Cameron married Colleen Venables in 1945, with whom he had two sons, including Terry who served in state parliament. He died at his home in Adelaide on 5 June 1998, aged 84.
