= Don Devitt =

Australian politician

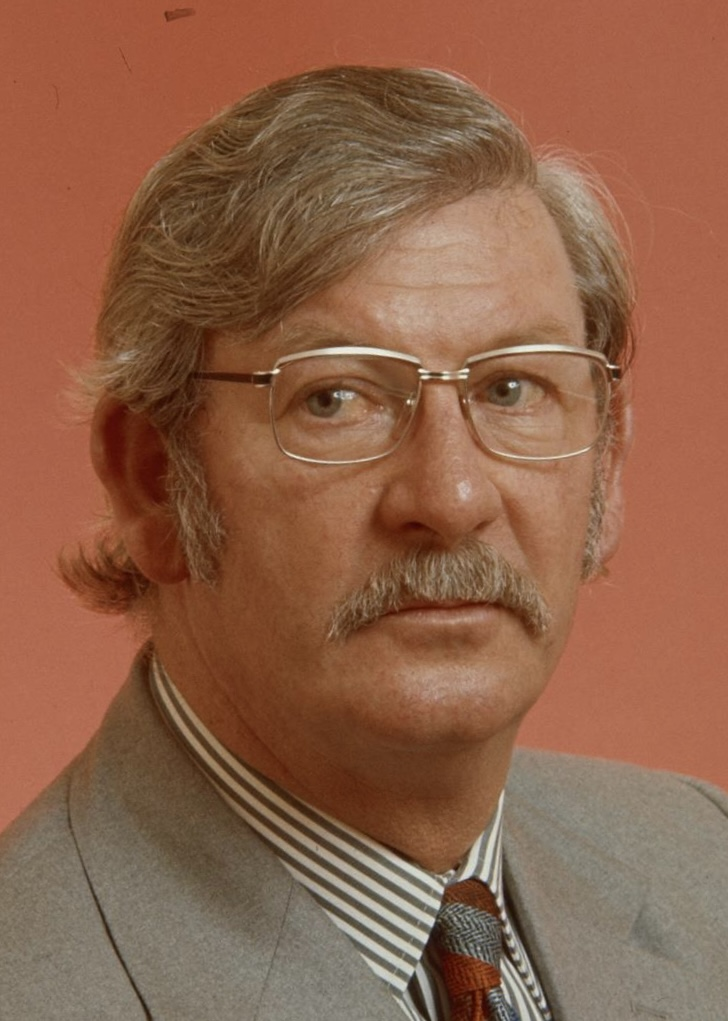

Senator for Tasmania
- In office 1 July 1965 – 30 June 1978

Personal details
- Born: 11 July 1921 Launceston, Tasmania, Australia
- Died: 10 July 2008 (aged 86) Burnie, Tasmania, Australia
- Party: Labor
- Spouse: Dorothy Malley (m. 1947)
- Occupation: Clerk; Farmer

Donald Michael Devitt (11 July 1921 – 10 July 2008) was an Australian politician. He served as a Senator for Tasmania from 1965 to 1978, representing the Australian Labor Party (ALP).

== Early life ==
Devitt was born on 11 July 1921 in Launceston, Tasmania. He was the son of Irish Catholic parents Kathleen Mary (née Maloney) and William Francis Devitt; his father was a police inspector. He was said to be a great-grandson of Irish nationalist Michael Davitt.

Devitt was raised in Smithton and attended the local state school, leaving in 1937. He joined the Citizen Military Forces in January 1942 and transferred to the Australian Imperial Force in August 1942. He transferred again to the Royal Australian Air Force in August 1944 and was posted to the No. 1 Initial Training School in Somers, Victoria. He was discharged from the air force in July 1945 with the rank of leading aircraftman.

After the war's end, Devitt worked in local government as a clerk, spending periods in Queenstown, Scottsdale and Beaconsfield and holding various offices including clerk of petty sessions, registrar of the court of requests and registrar of the court of general sessions. In 1956 he settled on a dairy farm at Trowutta.

== Politics ==
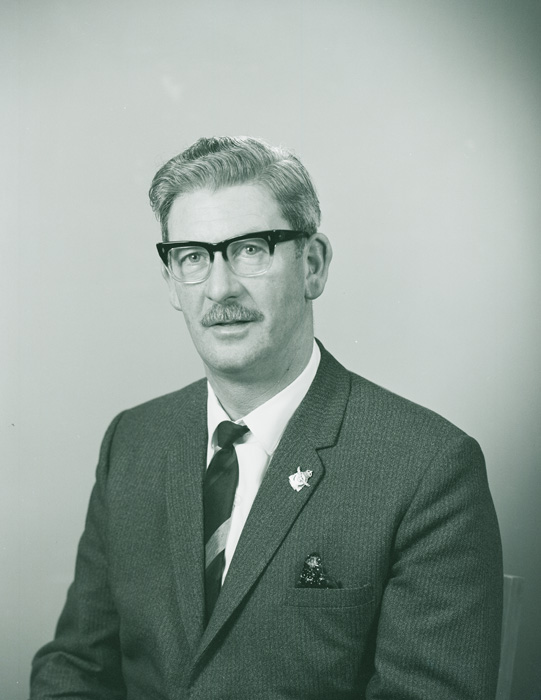
Devitt in 1968

Devitt joined the Australian Labor Party in the mid-1950s and was president and secretary of his local branch. He first stood for parliament at the 1961 federal election, running third on the ALP's Senate ticket, but was defeated for the final vacancy by independent candidate and former Labor state government minister Reg Turnbull.

At the 1964 half-Senate election, Devitt was elected to a six-year term beginning on 1 July 1965. He was re-elected at the 1970, 1974 and 1975 elections. He announced he would not recontest his seat in June 1976 and retired at the expiry of his term on 30 June 1978.

Devitt was active on a number of Senate committees. He was a long-serving member of the Joint Standing Committee on the Australian Capital Territory, including as chairman for a brief period in 1975 before the dismissal of the Whitlam government. He was also chairman of the Standing Committee on Regulations and Ordinances from 1973 to 1976. On 11 November 1975, Devitt was one of the first senators to speak following the government's dismissal. He and the other ALP senators were unaware of what had occurred, and he instead spoke on the disallowance of certain postal regulations.

In the Senate, Devitt spoke regularly on local government and was interested in the development of Canberra. In 1969 he secured a select committee inquiry into the operations of the Canberra abattoir. In 1978 he became the first sitting senator to visit Macquarie Island and the Australian Antarctic Territory.

== Personal life ==
In 1947 Devitt married Dorothy Malley, with whom he had two children. After retiring from politics he worked in real estate for a period and took up yachting, silversmithing and lapidary as hobbies. He died on 10 July 2008 in Burnie, Tasmania.
