= Ellis Lawrie =

Australian politician

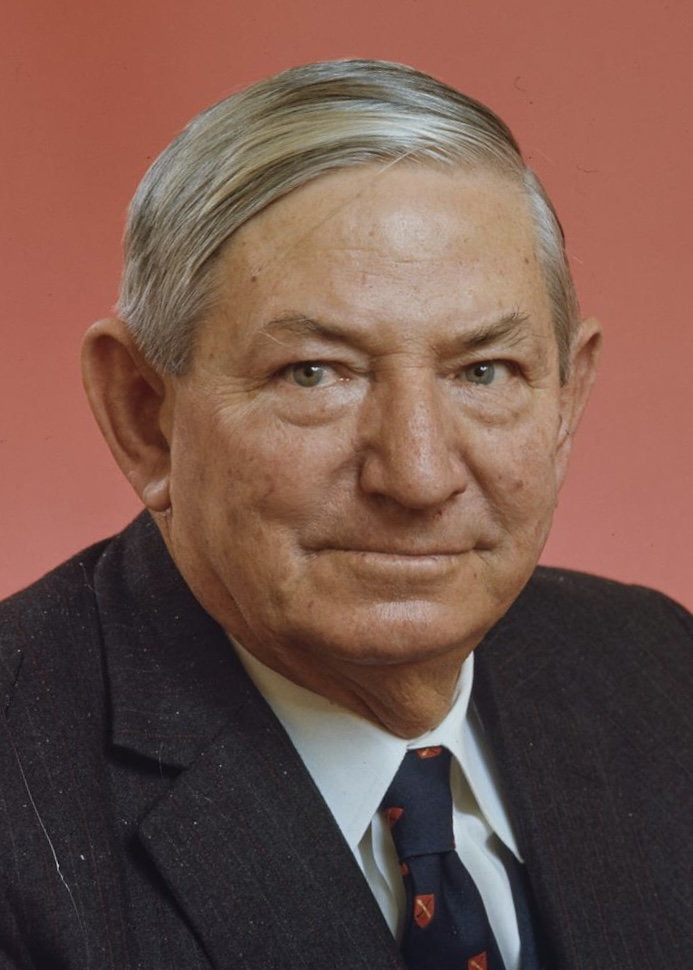
- Lawrie in 1974

Senator for Queensland
- In office 1 July 1965 – 11 November 1975

Personal details
- Born: 19 June 1907 Lorn, New South Wales, Australia
- Died: 13 December 1978 (aged 71) Rockhampton, Queensland, Australia
- Party: Country
- Spouse: Margaret Hayes (m. 1939)
- Occupation: Grazier

Alexander Greig Ellis Lawrie (19 June 1907 – 13 December 1978) was an Australian politician. Born in Maitland, New South Wales, he was educated at The Scots College in Sydney before moving to Evergreen in Queensland to become a grazier. He was an official of the Queensland Graziers' Association and served as Queensland State President of the Country Party 1960–1964. In 1963, he was elected to the Australian Senate as a Country Party Senator for Queensland. He remained a Senator until his retirement in 1975.

== Early life ==
Lawrie was born on 19 June 1907 in Lorn, New South Wales. He was the son of Ilma (née Norrie) and Alexander Greig Lawrie. His father, a grazier, was the grandson of Scottish immigrants who had arrived in the Hunter Valley in 1850.

Lawrie spent his early years at Bonnington Park, his father's grazing property on the Allyn River. The property was sold in 1916 and the family moved to Queensland where his father had other pastoral interests near Rockhampton. He attended Rockhampton Grammar School for two years, later boarding at Scots College, Sydney, from 1918 to 1921. He left school at the age of fourteen and joined his father working at Booralong, a pastoral lease near Westwood, Queensland. Their development of the property included "large-scale clearing of brigalow, the eradication of prickly pear, ringbarking, pasture improvement, dry land cotton farming and the evolution of a Devon beef cattle stud".

== Politics ==
=== Early involvement ===
Lawrie joined the Country Party in 1945 and became chair of its Westwood branch. He served on the Fitzroy Shire Council for thirteen years and was also a member of the executive of the United Graziers' Association of Queensland. In 1956, Lawrie was elected as a state vice-president of the Country Party. He succeeded as state president in 1960.

=== Senate ===
Lawrie was elected to the Senate at the 1964 election, with his six-year term commencing on 1 July 1965. He was re-elected to a further six-year term in 1970, which was cut short by a double dissolution. He was re-elected again at the 1974 election, but following another double dissolution chose to retire prior to the 1975 election.

== Personal life ==
In 1939, Lawrie married Margaret Hayes, a schoolteacher who later became a prominent amateur anthropologist working in the Torres Strait Islands. She was also an officeholder in the Country Party. The couple had four children.

Lawrie died in Rockhampton on 13 December 1978, aged 71.
