= Tom Bull =

Australian politician

Senator for New South Wales
- In office 1 July 1965 – 30 June 1971

Personal details
- Born: 7 September 1905 Wagga Wagga, New South Wales, Australia
- Died: 11 August 1976 (aged 70) Wagga Wagga, New South Wales, Australia
- Party: Country
- Spouse: Jessie Hendry (m. 1937)
- Relations: Richard Bull (son)
- Occupation: Grazier, company director

Thomas Louis Bull (7 September 1905 – 11 August 1976) was an Australian politician. He was a member of the Country Party and served as a Senator for New South Wales from 1965 to 1971. He was a pastoralist in the Narrandera district outside of his political career.

== Early life ==
Bull was born on 7 September 1905 in Wagga Wagga, New South Wales. He was the fourth of five sons born to Charlotte Roberta (née Tresilian) and Henry James Bull.

Bull was raised on his family's grazing property and began his education at a one-teacher school at Gobbagaula. He later boarded at Wesley College, Melbourne, before returning to work on the family properties. During World War II he was a member of the Volunteer Defence Corps from 1942 to 1945, reaching the rank of lieutenant.

In 1948, Bull acquired "Yarramundi", a sheep and cattle property of 5,000 acres (2,000 ha) located on the Murrumbidgee River near Euroley. He was a member of the Narrandera Pastures Protection Board from 1943 until his death and served three terms as chairman. He was also president of the Graziers' Association of Riverina from 1959 to 1962 and president of the Australian Woolgrowers' and Graziers' Council from 1962 to 1965. In that role he helped establish the Australian Wool Industry Conference as a step towards unification with the Australian Wool and Meat Producers' Federation.

== Politics ==
Bull served as secretary of the Narrandera branch of the Country Party from 1945 to 1966.

At the 1964 Senate election, Bull was elected to a six-year term commencing on 1 July 1965. He was active across several Senate committees including as a member of the Joint Standing Committee on Foreign Affairs from 1965 to 1969 and as chairman of the Standing Committee on Primary and Secondary Industry and Trade from 1970 to 1971. He served as chairman of committees from 1969 to 1971 and favoured an expansion of the committee system.

Bull spoke regularly on the rural industry and was known as a free trader in contrast to his protectionist party leader John McEwen. He believed increased production costs for primary producers could be offset by advances in technology and scientific research. Bull was protective of the Senate's role as a house of review and in 1965 crossed the floor to vote with Democratic Labor Party (DLP) senators against the Menzies government's referendum proposal to remove the nexus clause in the constitution. He was defeated by DLP candidate Jack Kane for the final Senate vacancy in New South Wales at the 1970 election, with his term concluding on 30 June 1971.

== Personal life ==
In 1937, Bull married schoolteacher Jessie Hendry, with whom he had four children. His son Richard Bull was later elected to the New South Wales Legislative Council.

Bull died at Wagga Wagga Base Hospital on 11 August 1976, aged 70.
