= Edgar Prowse =

Australian politician

Deputy President of the Senate
- In office 17 August 1971 – 31 December 1973
- Preceded by: Tom Bull
- Succeeded by: James Webster

Senator for Western Australia
- In office 1 July 1962 – 31 December 1973
- Succeeded by: David Reid

Personal details
- Born: Edgar Wylie Prowse; 22 March 1905 Mount Kokeby, Western Australia
- Died: 2 June 1977 (aged 72) Darkan, Western Australia
- Party: Country
- Education: University of Western Australia

Edgar Wylie Prowse (22 March 1905 – 2 June 1977) was an Australian politician who served as a Senator for Western Australia from 1962 to 1973, representing the Country Party. He was a farmer before entering politics.

== Early life ==
Prowse was born in Mount Kokeby, Western Australia, to Maud Helena Grace (née Quarmby) and Albert Edward Cornwall Prowse. His uncle, John Prowse, served in the House of Representatives. Prowse attended primary school in Perth and Doodlakine, and then studied at Northam High School before going on to the University of Western Australia. He returned to the family property at Doodlakine after graduating, and wrote on agricultural topics for the Daily News. Prowse was prominent in the Wheat Growers' Union, serving on the state executive, and was on the Kellerberrin Road Board from 1945 to 1949. He moved to Darkan in 1949.

== Politics and later life ==
Prowse was state president of the Country Party from 1957 to 1962, and also served on the federal council and federal executive. He won first spot on the party's senate ticket for the 1961 federal election, and was elected to a term beginning in July 1962. In the senate, Prowse had wide-ranging interests. He was a leading campaigner for the "no" vote on the 1967 referendum, which sought to amend the constitution to increase the power of the House of Representatives in joint sittings. He was also one of the few opponents of capital punishment in the Country Party. Prowse was elected chairman of committees in 1971, but resigned from parliament in 1973 due to ill health.

He retired to Albany, and managed a cattle stud at Elleker. Prowse died in Darkan in June 1977, aged 72. He had married Lucy Cherry in 1933, with whom he had six children.

== See also ==
- Members of the Australian Senate
