= John Wheeldon =

Australian politician

The Honourable John Wheeldon
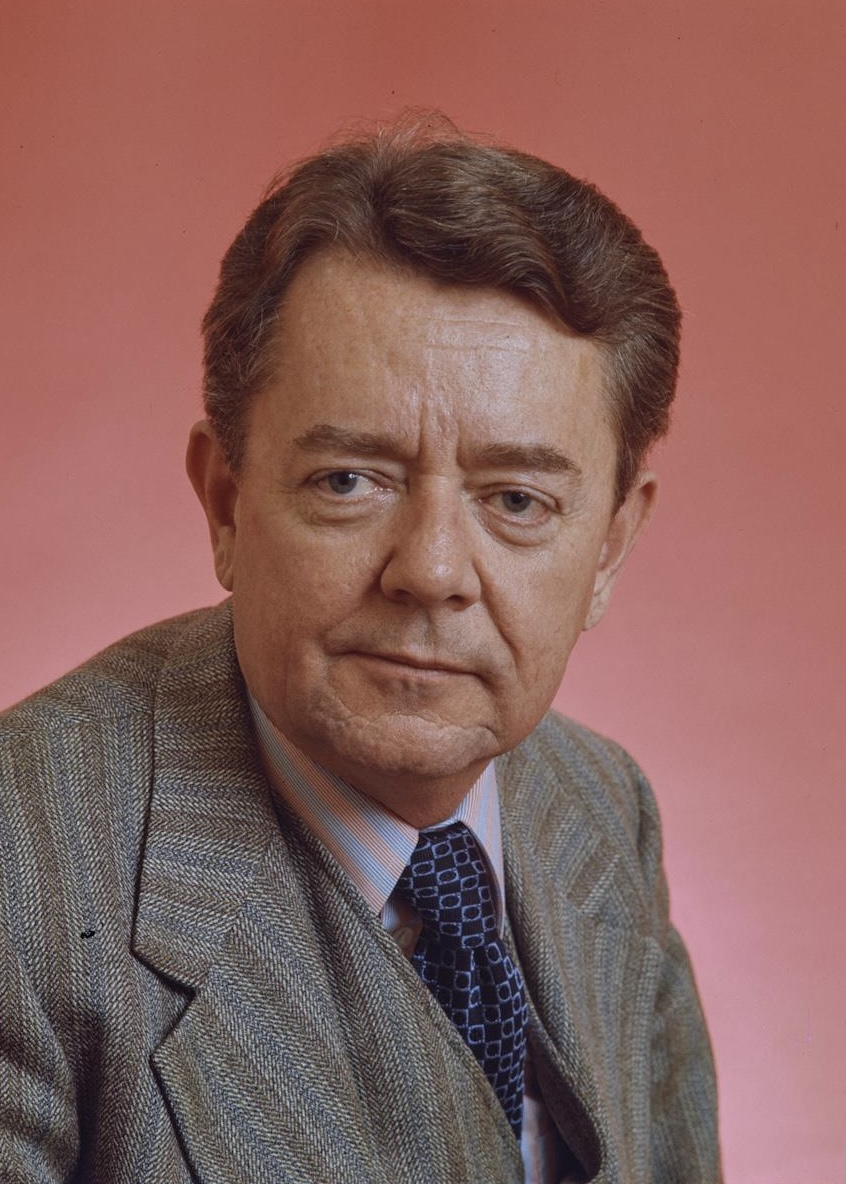

Minister for Social Security
- In office 6 June 1975 – 11 November 1975
- Prime Minister: Gough Whitlam
- Preceded by: Bill Hayden
- Succeeded by: Don Chipp

Minister for Repatriation and Compensation
- In office 12 June 1974 – 11 November 1975
- Prime Minister: Gough Whitlam
- Preceded by: Reg Bishop (Repatriation)
- Succeeded by: Don Chipp

Senator for Western Australia
- In office 1 July 1965 – 30 June 1981

Personal details
- Born: 9 August 1929 Subiaco, Western Australia, Australia
- Died: 24 May 2006 (aged 76) Sydney, Australia
- Party: Labor
- Spouse: Judith
- Education: University of Western Australia
- Occupation: Solicitor

John Murray Wheeldon (9 August 1929 – 24 May 2006) was an Australian politician and journalist. A member of the Australian Labor Party (ALP), he served as an Australian Senator for Western Australia from 1965 to 1981. In the Whitlam government, he was the Minister for Repatriation and Compensation (1974–1975) and Minister for Social Security (1975). He was known for his views on Australian foreign policy and after leaving politics became an editorial writer for The Australian.

== Early career ==
Wheeldon was born in Subiaco, Western Australia and educated at Perth Modern School and the University of Western Australia. He graduated in arts and law and then worked as a solicitor. He later served as President of the Western Australian Young Liberals, but resigned in protest at Robert Menzies' attempt to ban the Communist Party of Australia, declaring that it "seemed rather fatuous to call itself the Liberal Party and then introduce a bill like that."

== Political career ==
At the 1964 half-Senate election, Wheeldon was elected to the Australian Senate, representing the Australian Labor Party. His term began on 1 July 1965. He strongly opposed the Vietnam War and, though not a supporter of communism, visited North Vietnam at the invitation of the North Vietnam peace committee while Australia was involved in fighting in South Vietnam. In 1967, he spoke against the war in the United States with Jim Cairns. According to Senator John Faulkner, Wheeldon "... showed real passion for the causes he believed in: his opposition to the Vietnam War, his support for the independence of East Timor, his abhorrence of apartheid and his deep concern about Soviet imperialism."

Wheeldon was appointed Minister for Repatriation and Compensation in June 1974 in Gough Whitlam's third ministry and was responsible for implementing Whitlam's ambitious plan to establish a national compensation scheme. In addition, he was appointed Minister for Social Security in June 1975 when Bill Hayden was appointed Treasurer. Both appointments were terminated by the dismissal of the Whitlam government in November 1975. Wheeldon remained a senator until 30 June 1981, having chosen not to contest the 1980 election.

In 1968, Charles Spry, the director-general of the Australian Security Intelligence Organisation (ASIO), suspected that Wheeldon was compromised by his contact with a female staff member of the French embassy in Canberra. She appeared to have a personal relationship with Soviet diplomatic staff suspected of being intelligence agents. In a declassified top secret "Note to Prime Minister" in 1968 (apparently prepared for the benefit of Prime Minister John Gorton), Spry characterised Wheeldon's actions as "consistent with those of at least a collaborator with the RIS [Russian Intelligence Service]. He may be a recruited agent." Wheeldon was never questioned about Spry's suspicions. The woman who was the sole source of the accusations against him left the country and admitted herself to Horton Hospital at Surrey, a psychiatric institution.

A declassified "top secret" ASIO minute from 1974 indicates that ASIO officers had "considerable doubts" at the time about the truthfulness of the woman who claimed to be the connection between Wheeldon and the suspected Soviet agents, and that these doubts were not reflected in the file specifying the young woman's accusations against Wheeldon. The note suggests that the file Spry used to brief Prime Ministers Holt and Gorton did not reflect these doubts, either.

According to Ian Hancock's biography of Gorton, in 1968 Spry sought to block Wheeldon's fiancée, Judith Werner (now Judith Wheeldon) from entering Australia on the grounds that her father was a member of the Communist Party USA, but "Gorton would have none of it. He brusquely dismissed both Spry and his file... he had no time for public servants who behaved as a law unto themselves".

In 1968, Wheeldon was a leading critic in the Australian parliament of the Soviet Union's invasion of Czechoslovakia.

During the 1970s, Wheeldon worked for the United States in what a historian has called "a discreet relationship".

In 1978, Wheeldon was a primary author of Human Rights in the Soviet Union, a report by the Australian parliament's Joint Committee on Foreign Affairs and Defence, which was harshly critical of the Soviet Union.

In 1980, Wheeldon was a parliamentary adviser to Australia's permanent delegation to the United Nations General Assembly in New York City.

== After politics ==
In 1980, while part of Australia's delegation to the United Nations General Assembly, Wheeldon rekindled an old friendship with Rupert Murdoch, who offered him a position as associate editor of The Australian newspaper.

Wheeldon was chief editorial writer for The Australian from 1981 to 1995. He also wrote articles for the monthly magazine Quadrant and other periodicals.

He died at his house in Sydney, survived by his wife, Judith (headmistress of Abbotsleigh School for Girls, 1996–2005) and their son, and a daughter and a son from his first marriage. His son with Judith is James Wheeldon, a prominent Sydney barrister and former ASIC whistleblower.

== Notes ==
Political offices
Preceded by Reg Bishop	Minister for Repatriation and Compensation; 1974–75	Succeeded by Don Chipp
Preceded by Bill Hayden	Minister for Social Services; 1975	Succeeded by Don Chipp
