= Arnold Drury =

Australian politician (1912–1995)

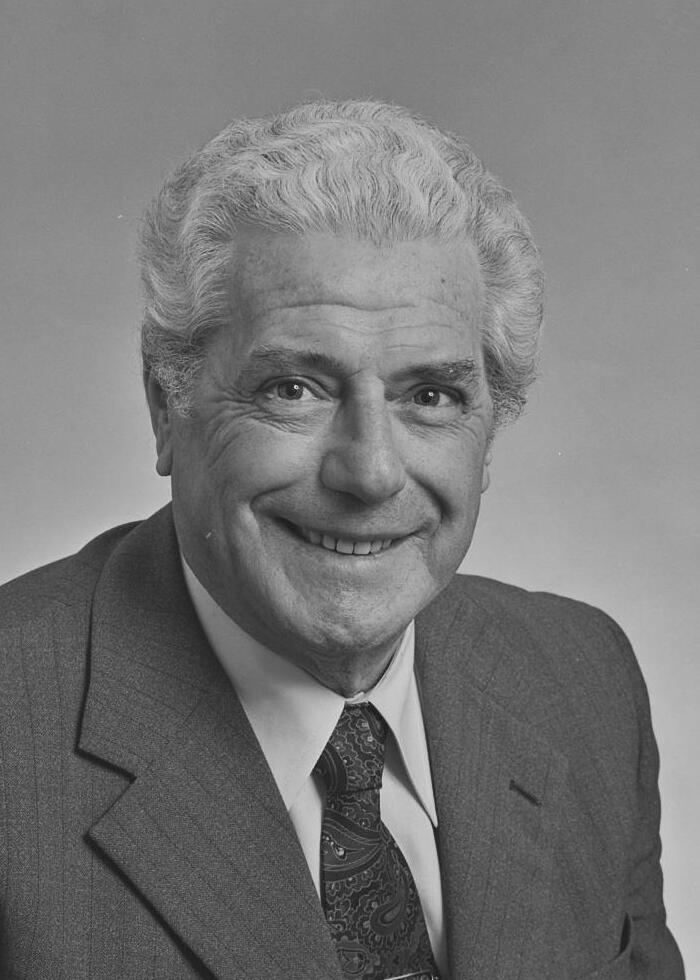

Senator for South Australia
- In office 1 July 1959 – 11 November 1975

Personal details
- Born: 23 July 1912 Adelaide, South Australia, Australia
- Died: 10 October 1995 (aged 83) Lockleys, South Australia, Australia
- Party: Labor
- Spouse: Mona Elliott (m. 1938)
- Occupation: Factory worker

Arnold Joseph Drury (23 July 1912 – 10 October 1995) was an Australian politician. He was a member of the Australian Labor Party (ALP) and served as a Senator for South Australia from 1959 to 1975. He was a World War II veteran and had been a factory worker and trade unionist prior to his election to parliament.

== Early life ==
Drury was born in Adelaide on 23 July 1912. He was born into a working-class Catholic family, the sixth of eight children born to Mary (née Allen) and William Drury.

Drury received his early education at St Mary's Dominican Convent in Adelaide. He left school at the age of 14 and subsequently worked as a factory hand. He became a foreman at Julius Cohn & Co., a firm of leather merchants and manufacturing grocers with their plant in Torrensville. He was a member of the Manufacturing Grocers' Employees' Federation of Australia.

During World War II, Drury enlisted in the Australian Imperial Force (AIF) in January 1941. He was placed on medical leave from September 1942 to February 1943. He was transferred to the Australian Army Catering Corps in June 1943, working as a cook. He later transferred back to the AIF and served in New Guinea and New Britain, prior to his discharge in August 1945.

== Politics ==
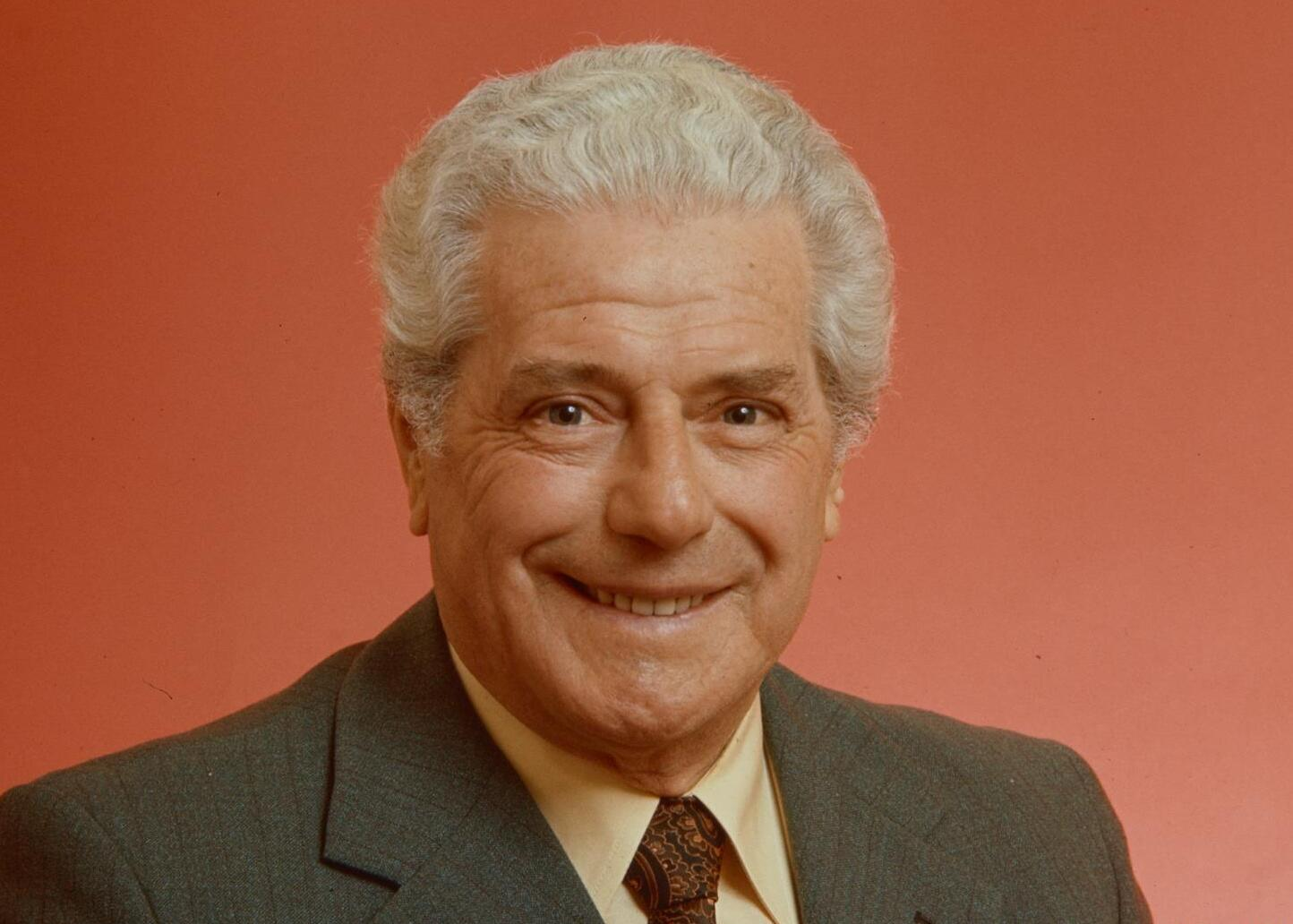
Drury in 1974

Drury was a member of the Thebarton branch of the ALP and served on the state executive from 1957 to 1959. He was elected to the Senate at the 1958 federal election, to an initial six-year term beginning on 1 July 1959. Despite a relatively low profile in the party and union movement, he was known as a loyal party member and was placed on the ticket with the support of powerbroker Clyde Cameron, who believed a Catholic was needed to mitigate against the influence of the Catholic-dominated Democratic Labor Party (DLP).

Drury was re-elected to further six-year terms at the 1964 and 1970 elections, topping the ALP ticket at the latter. His term was cut short by a double dissolution in 1974, but he was re-elected at the subsequent election. Following another double dissolution, he agreed to drop down to sixth place on the ALP ticket at the 1975 election and was defeated.

In the Senate, Drury was active on a number of parliamentary committees, notably as a long-serving member of the Joint Committee on Foreign Affairs and the Senate Standing Committee on Foreign Affairs and Defence. He served as chairman of both committees from 1973 to 1974 during the Whitlam government, where he was interested in Australia–Japan relations. In 1969 he successfully moved for the establishment of a select committee on the Repatriation Department, with the aid of DLP senators. Following the ALP's victory at the 1972 election, he served as an adviser to repatriation minister Reg Bishop, a fellow South Australian. He welcomed the Whitlam government's withdrawal of the final Australian troops from Vietnam and supported the Defence Force Re-organization Act 1975 which reorganised the Department of Defence.

== Personal life ==
In 1938, Drury married Mona Elliott, with whom he had one son. He was active in the Knights of the Southern Cross and other Catholic charitable organisations, as well as volunteering for Meals on Wheels and the Returned and Services League. He died on 10 October 1995 in Lockleys, South Australia.
