= Jack Kane =

Australian politician

Senator for New South Wales
- In office 21 November 1970 – 18 May 1974
- Preceded by: Douglas Scott

Personal details
- Born: 23 July 1908 Burraga, New South Wales
- Died: 27 October 1988 (aged 80) Darlinghurst, New South Wales
- Party: Democratic Labor Party
- Occupation: Coal miner, unionist

John Thomas Kane (23 July 1908 – 27 October 1988) was an Australian politician. Born in Burraga, New South Wales, he was educated at Catholic schools in Lithgow, after which he became a coalminer. He was vice-president of the Transport Workers' Union 1952–1956 and Assistant General Secretary of the New South Wales Labor Party 1952–1955. In 1955, he was expelled from the Labor Party together with many other members, joining with them to form the Australian Labor Party (Anti-Communist), which became the Democratic Labor Party (DLP). He was the NSW DLP General Secretary 1956–1971 and the Federal Secretary 1957–1971.

In 1970, he was elected to the Australian Senate as a DLP Senator for New South Wales. Kane's election to the Senate resulted from a decision of the New South Wales Branch of the ALP to allocate preferences in favour of the DLP ticket rather than to the lead candidate of the Australia Party, television presenter Diana Ward. He was defeated (along with all the other DLP Senators) in the double dissolution election of 1974 and the DLP did not hold a Senate seat again until 2011. He died in 1988.

The Jack Kane memorial dinner was set up in 2011 by the NSW branch of the DLP. His son John Kane remains active in the party.
