= Harry Cant =

Australian politician

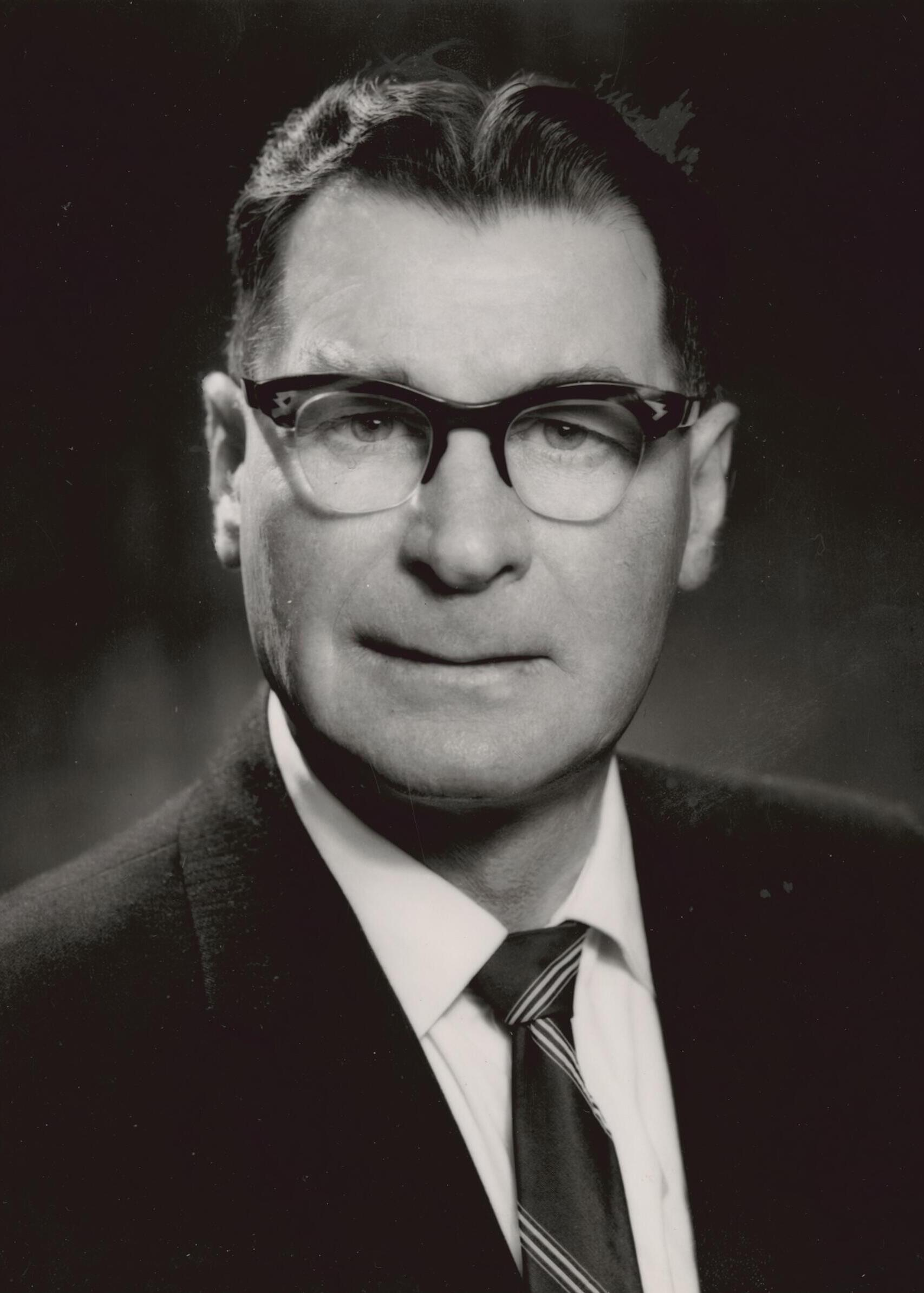

Senator for Western Australia
- In office 1 July 1959 – 11 April 1974

Personal details
- Born: Hartley Gordon James Cant; 19 November 1907 Mount Magnet, Western Australia, Australia
- Died: 3 March 1977 (aged 69) Nedlands, Western Australia, Australia
- Party: Labor
- Spouse(s): Thelma Christensen (m. 1931; div. 1942) Florence Newton (m. 1945; died 1977)
- Occupation: Miner

Hartley Gordon James "Harry" Cant (19 November 1907 – 3 March 1977) was an Australian politician. Born at Mount Magnet, Western Australia, he was educated at state schools and then the Kalgoorlie School of Mines, becoming a miner. He was an official with the Australian Workers' Union. In 1958, he was elected to the Australian Senate as a Labor Senator for Western Australia. He held the seat until 1974, when he retired. Cant died in 1977.

== Early life ==
Cant was born on 19 November 1907 in Mount Magnet, Western Australia. He was one of nine surviving children born to Bridget (née Bone) and Arthur Edward Cant; his father was a labourer.

Cant's family moved to Geraldton in 1914. He was educated at state schools and later attended the Kalgoorlie School of Mines. He was a member of the Australian Workers' Union (AWU) from 1922, when he was recorded working as a labourer at Day Dawn. He later worked as a shed hand at Meekatharra before returning to Geraldton for several years. In 1931, Cant was among four members of a football team convicted of "unlawful possession of four turkeys reasonably suspected of having been stolen or otherwise unlawfully obtained" from a pub in Nabawa. In 1938 he was working at the remote mining town of Wiluna, and in the 1940s he worked on the gold mines in Kalgoorlie-Boulder.

== Labour movement ==
In 1949, Cant was elected chairman of the Kalgoorlie-Boulder section of the AWU. In the same year he moved to Perth after being appointed as a paid organiser for the union. He was nominated to the position by AWU mining state secretary Charlie Oliver and the following year was appointed as an industrial officer, making appearances before the Court of Arbitration of Western Australia. He represented "construction and maintenance workers, wheat handlers, and dredge, lead mine, oil refinery and port construction workers".

Cant led a 1955 campaign by the AWU which secured access for union safety officials on mine sites. He was nominated by the AWU's executive to a committee reviewed proposed changes to workers' compensation legislation in 1956. He also served on the Library Board of Western Australia from 1957 to 1958 and as an executive officer on the West Australian Trade Union Industrial Council in 1958.

== Politics ==
Cant joined the Australian Labor Party in 1928 and served on the party's state executive for over 20 years. He was elected to the Senate at the 1958 federal election, winning a six-year term beginning on 1 July 1959. He was re-elected at the 1964 and 1970 elections, retiring prior to the 1974 election following a double dissolution.

Cant's maiden speech in the Senate was notable for its comparisons of the Menzies government to Hitler, Mussolini and Tsarist Russia. In 1962, he criticised the establishment of U.S. military bases in Western Australia, stating they amounted to an annexation. In the same year, he was one of five ALP officials who unsuccessfully sued Liberal Party state secretary Vivian Ockerby for defamation, alongside Joe Chamberlain, Keith Dowding, Arthur Fox, and Laurie Wilkinson.

In 1966, Cant reportedly had to be physically restrained by his ALP colleague Pat Kennelly after threatening to assault Liberal senator Reg Wright in the Senate chamber.

Cant played a significant role in the VIP affair of 1967 which proved politically damaging for the Holt government. In October 1967 he introduced an amendment to a Senate resolution which called on the government to table all data on the use of VIP aircraft, which was passed by ten votes and for the Coalition represented the "most substantial defeat in the Senate since taking office in 1949". Following the release of flight manifests, he accused Prime Minister Harold Holt of having misled parliament and having misused VIP flights for family members.

== Personal life ==
In 1931, Cant married Thelma Christensen, with whom he had three children. In 1942 she successfully petitioned for divorce on the grounds of abandonment, stating they had been estranged since 1938.

Cant remarried in 1945 to Florence "Bebe" Newton and had two stepchildren from his second marriage. After moving to Perth they initially lived in Rivervale and later settled in Subiaco. He died at Sir Charles Gairdner Hospital on 3 March 1977, having been widowed a short time before.
