= George Branson =

Australian politician (1918–1999)

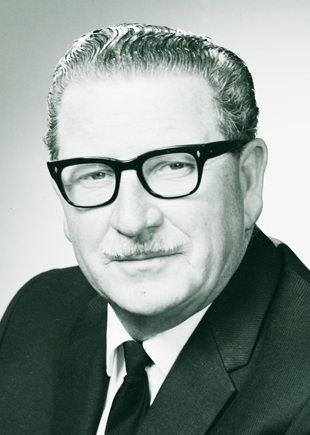

Senator for Western Australia
- In office 22 November 1958 – 30 June 1971

Personal details
- Born: 23 February 1918 Perth, Western Australia, Australia
- Died: 27 January 1999 (aged 80) Wanneroo, Western Australia, Australia
- Party: Liberal
- Spouses: Isla Burlinson (m. 1940–1973) Hanni Zimmermann (m. 1973)
- Occupation: Farmer

George Howard Branson (23 February 1918 – 27 January 1999) was an Australian politician who served as a Senator for Western Australia from 1958 to 1971, representing the Liberal Party.

== Early life ==
Branson was born in Perth on 23 February 1918. He was the third of five surviving children born to Ethel May (née Carrett and Howard Henry Branson.

Branson's father had previously worked as a gold miner, but in the 1920s the family settled on a wheat and dairy farm in Babakin, Western Australia. He was educated at the local primary school and after leaving school worked on the family farm until 1937. He subsequently worked as a stock agent in Bruce Rock, as a car salesman in Kalgoorlie, and as a travelling salesman selling agricultural and household products.

== Military service ==
Branson enlisted in the Australian Imperial Force in December 1940. He was initially posted to the 13th Training Battalion and then transferred to the 2/4th Machine Gun Battalion. He was promoted lieutenant in August 1941 and following the outbreak of the Pacific War was dispatched to Singapore with his regiment in January 1942. Branson became a Japanese prisoner of war following the fall of Singapore in February 1942. He was interned at Changi Prison and also spent time imprisoned in Malaya and working on the Burma Railway. At Changi he and other officers - including his future parliamentary colleague Ken Anderson - formed a political discussion group. He was released in September 1945 following the Allied recovery of Singapore and repatriated to Australia the following month.

== Politics ==
Having returned to Babakin after the war's end, Branson joined the Liberal and Country League and worked to establish new branches. He was also active in the Returned Sailors and Soldiers Imperial League of Australia and the Farmers' Union of Western Australia.

=== Electoral record ===
Branson first stood for parliament at the 1955 federal election. He defeated 72-year-old incumbent senator Agnes Robertson in the Liberal Party preselection ballot, in part due to concerns about Robertson's age. Robertson then defected to the Country Party and actively campaigned against Branson, eventually defeating him for the final Senate vacancy in Western Australia.

At the 1958 election, Branson was elected to a six-year Senate term commencing on 1 July 1959, running in second position on the Liberal ticket. Under the constitutional provisions at the time, his term began immediately as he was deemed to have been elected to fill the remainder of the casual vacancy caused by the death of Harrie Seward. Branson was re-elected at the 1964 election. He chose not to recontest his seat at the 1970 election, with his term expiring on 30 June 1971.

=== Political views and controversies ===
Branson spoke on a wide range of topics in the Senate. He was active on several Senate committees including as chair of the select committee on air pollution from 1968 to 1969. In 1967 he proposed the creation of a Senate standing committee on privileges, to match the system used in the House of Representatives. His proposal was adopted and he subsequently became an inaugural member of the committee. However, he resigned from the privileges committee in 1971 to protest the government's refusal to allow the committee to investigate leaks from an inquiry of the Select Committee on Drug Trafficking and Drug Abuse in Australia, of which he was a member.

Branson was known as a political conservative, although he supported the legalisation of marijuana. He lobbied for the introduction of broadcast relay stations to provide for better television coverage in regional Western Australia, which occurred when the Menzies government amended the Broadcasting and Television Act 1942 in 1963. Branson crossed the floor on four occasions during his tenure. In 1966 he crossed the floor to vote against proposed amendments to the filling of casual vacancies in the Senate and in 1967 he voted in favour of a motion of dissent against a ruling by Senate president Alister McMullin, preventing ministers from terminating question time in the Senate without a vote.

In November 1964, Branson alleged in the Senate that two Australian Labor Party (ALP) ministers had considered making a separate peace with Japan during World War II. He later specified that H. V. Evatt and Eddie Ward were the ministers involved and that this information had been provided by an unnamed informant. Branson's remarks caused considerable controversy and he was publicly rebuked by both the ALP and by Prime Minister Robert Menzies. He withdrew his allegations a few days later and publicly apologised in the Senate, stating that his source had refused permission to be named.

After he left the Senate, Branson remained active in politics for several years. In March 1976 he and Liberal minister Vic Garland were charged by the Commonwealth Police with offences against the Commonwealth Electoral Act 1918. They were alleged to have paid $500 to cover the electoral expenses of Michael Cavanough, an independent Senate candidate in the Australian Capital Territory (ACT), on the condition that he direct his preferences to the Liberal candidate John Knight. Garland and Branson denied that they had engaged in bribery, as they were of the belief that Cavanough had already agreed to give his preferences to Knight. The charges were dismissed at a committal hearing in the Magistrates Court of the Australian Capital Territory, with the chief magistrate stating that there was a prima facie case against the pair but that "a jury properly directed would not convict the defendants". The Canberra Times was critical of the decision to discharge the defendants without a trial, stating that it left doubt as to the legality of their conduct and deprived them of the vindication of an acquittal.

== Personal life ==
In 1940, Branson married Isla Burlinson, with whom he had four sons. He divorced in 1973 and in the same year remarried to Hannelore Zimmermann, a German immigrant. In 1989 they retired to Wanneroo, Western Australia. He died on 27 January 1999, aged 81.
