= Colin McKellar =

Australian politician

The Honourable Colin McKellar
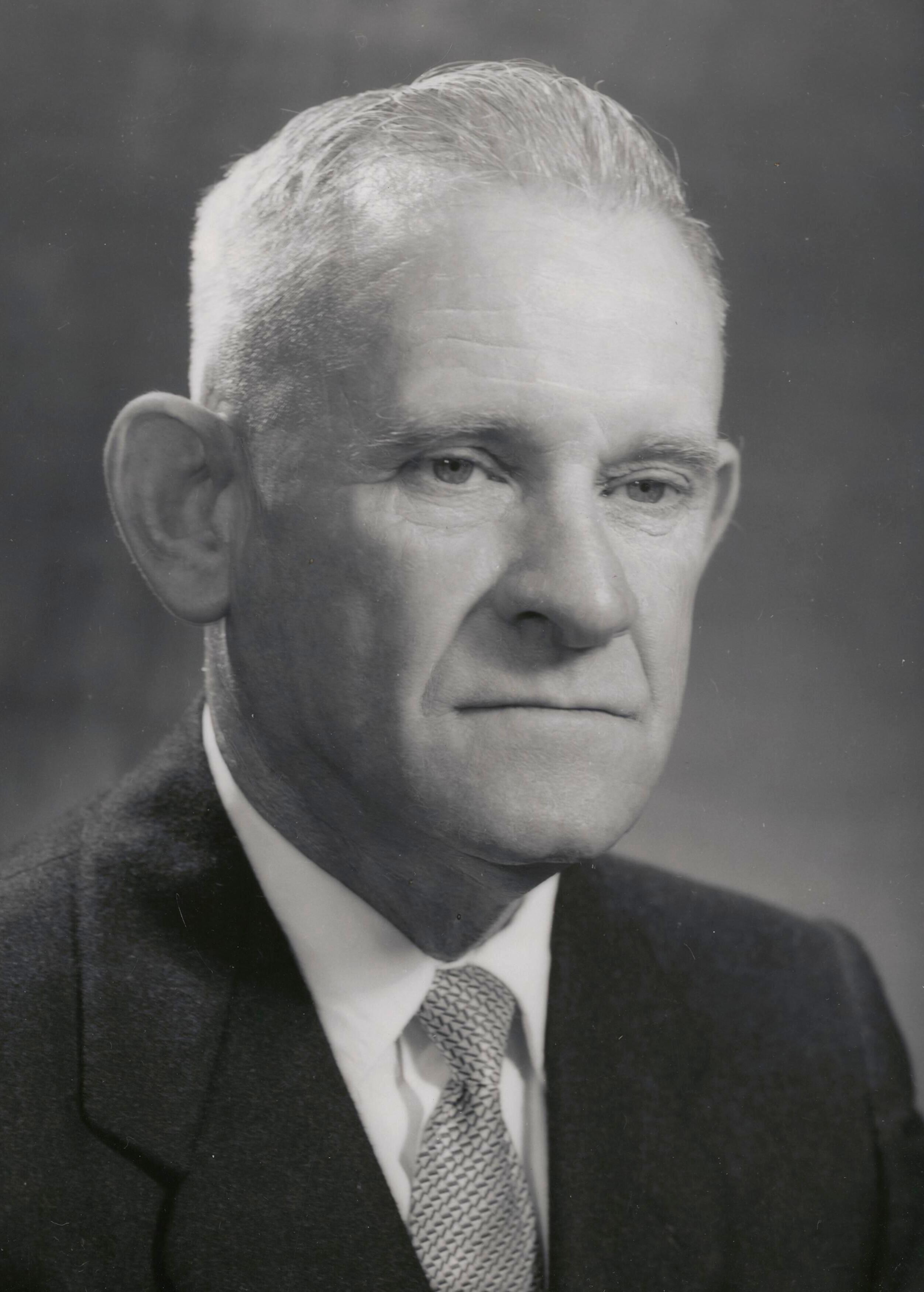

Minister for Repatriation
- In office 22 December 1964 – 12 November 1969
- Prime Minister: Robert Menzies; Harold Holt; John McEwen; John Gorton
- Preceded by: Reg Swartz
- Succeeded by: Mac Holten

Senator for New South Wales
- In office 22 November 1958 – 13 April 1970
- Preceded by: James Ormonde
- Succeeded by: Douglas Scott

Personal details
- Born: 29 May 1903 Gulgong, New South Wales, Australia
- Died: 13 April 1970 (aged 66) Sydney, New South Wales, Australia
- Party: Country
- Spouse: Florence Smith (m. 1926)
- Occupation: Farmer, soldier

Gerald Colin McKellar (29 May 1903 – 13 April 1970) was an Australian politician. He was a member of the Country Party and served as a Senator for New South Wales from 1958 until his death in 1970. He was Minister for Repatriation from 1964 to 1969. He was a World War II veteran and grazier before entering parliament.

== Early life ==
McKellar was born on 29 May 1903 in Gulgong, New South Wales. He was the son of Margaret Jane (née Travis) and Gerald Murdoch McKellar. His father was a farmer.

McKellar lived in the Mendooran district until 1907. He later attended the public school in Gilgandra. After leaving school he farmed on wheat and sheep properties including "Briodale" near Gilgandra and "Mirrawonga" near Dubbo. He was active in the Gilgandra Pastoral and Agricultural Association, which organised the district's annual agricultural show, and was a director of the Dubbo Pastures Protection Board (1951–1959) and a councillor of the New South Wales Sheepbreeders' Association (1960–1964). He served for two years as chairman of Gilgandra Newspapers Pty Ltd, the publisher of The Gilgandra Weekly.

In 1936, McKellar was commissioned as a lieutenant in the Militia. He commanded the Gilgandra troop of the 6th Light Horse Regiment and in that capacity was an extra in the 1940 film Forty Thousand Horsemen, riding in the "dramatic cavalry charge". McKellar was mobilised to the 6th Motor Regiment in June 1941. He was promoted major and transferred to the Australian Imperial Force in September 1942. He was later posted to the 26th Motor Regiment and 4th Motor Regiment. In June 1945 he was made commanding officer of the 1st Ordnance Field Park, then transferred to the reserve of officers in June 1946.

== Political career ==
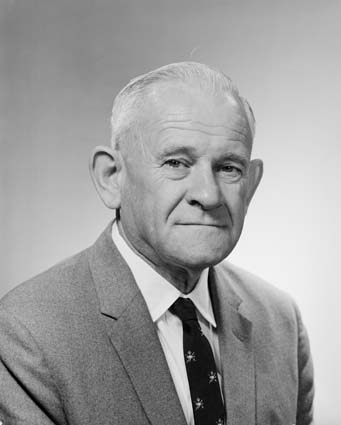
McKellar in 1967

McKellar joined the Gilgandra branch of the Country Party in the late 1920s. He was elected as the branch chairman in 1947 and served on the party's state executive from 1949 to 1970, including as chairman from 1957 to 1959. He also served on the party's federal council (1957–1959, 1962–1969) and Federal Executive (1957–1959, 1968–1969).

McKellar was elected to the Senate at the 1958 federal election, running on the Country Party ticket in New South Wales. He was elected to fill the remainder of the term of Australian Labor Party (ALP) senator Bill Ashley, who had died in office. He was re-elected to six-year terms in his own right at the 1961 and 1967 elections.

McKellar's maiden speech focused on national development, defence and wool. He was active on several Senate committees including the Standing Committee on Regulations and Ordinances (1959–1962) and the Joint Statutory Committee on Public Accounts (1961–1962). He was chairman of committees from 1962 to 1964.

=== Government minister ===
On 22 December 1964, McKellar was appointed Minister for Repatriation in the Menzies government, following a ministerial reshuffle. His portfolio was not of cabinet rank, but he gained prominence as Australia's involvement in the Vietnam War increased. He spent the Christmases of 1966 and 1967 visiting Australian soldiers in South Vietnam and met with Returned and Services League (RSL) branches, war widow groups and the Limbless Soldiers' Association.

In 1967, McKellar played a central role in the VIP aircraft affair in his capacity answering questions in the Senate on behalf of air minister Peter Howson, a member of the House of Representatives. He faced repeated questioning from independent senator Reg Turnbull and ALP senator Lionel Murphy, who believed Howson and Prime Minister Harold Holt were withholding information on VIP flight passenger manifests in order to cover up instances of misuse. After the missing manifests were tabled by government leader John Gorton, McKellar denied misleading parliament or attempting to hide information. Murphy later stated that, during the controversy, "all honourable senators were convinced of one thing, the complete integrity of Senator McKellar".

McKellar's final years in the repatriation portfolio were marked by conflict with the RSL over what it considered inadequate funding of war pensions and a "growing public perception that repatriation was subject to rorts and inefficiencies". In 1968 ex-servicemen advocate Bruce Ruxton accused him of inappropriately interfering in the determinations of war pensions assessment appeal tribunals. The Victorian branch of the RSL carried a no-confidence motion in McKellar, but several months later the Victorian state president William Hall moved a motion thanking McKellar at the RSL's national conference. He resigned from the ministry on 12 November 1969 due to ill health.

== Personal life ==
In 1926, McKellar married schoolteacher Florence Smith, with whom he had three sons. He was an elder in the Presbyterian Church of Australia for 25 years. He and his wife moved to the Sydney suburb of Castlecrag in 1960, with their sons taking over the grazing property.

McKellar suffered from coronary vasculary disease. He collapsed and died at The Australia Hotel on 13 April 1970 while attending a dinner organised by the Graziers' Association of New South Wales. He had previously been hospitalised after a heart attack in February 1970. He was granted a state funeral at St Stephen's Presbyterian Church, Sydney, and was cremated at the Northern Suburbs Crematorium.

In 1974, it was announced that a new suburb of Canberra would be named in McKellar's honour.

Political offices
Preceded by Reginald Swartz	Minister for Repatriation; 1964–1969	Succeeded by Mac Holten
