= John Marriott (Australian politician) =

Australian politician (1913–1994)

The Honourable John Marriott CBE
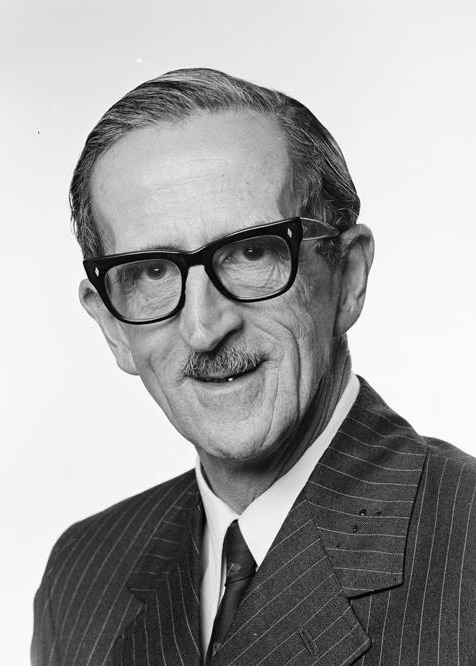

Senator for Tasmania
- In office 1 July 1953 – 11 November 1975
- In office 3 March 1953 – 8 May 1953
- Preceded by: Jack Chamberlain
- Succeeded by: Robert Wardlaw

Personal details
- Born: 16 February 1913 Elliott, Tasmania, Australia
- Died: 13 April 1994 (aged 81) Hobart, Tasmania, Australia
- Party: Liberal
- Spouse: Myra Viney (m. 1943)
- Relations: Frank Marriott (father); Fred Marriott (brother)

John Edward Marriott (16 February 1913 – 13 April 1994) was an Australian politician. He was a member of the Liberal Party and served as a Senator for Tasmania from 1953 to 1975. He briefly served as an assistant minister in the McMahon government from 1971 to 1972.

== Early life ==
Marriott was born on 16 February 1913 in Elliott, Tasmania. He was the youngest of four sons born to Alice Maud (née Harrison) and Frank Marriott; his father and older brother Fred were also members of parliament. His parents were both born in England.

Marriott spent his first years on a farming property near Elliott, which had belonged to his mother's family. His father was blinded while serving in the Australian Imperial Force during World War I. The family lived in England from 1919 to 1920 while his father attended St Dunstan's Hostel for the Blind. Marriott attended Launceston Church Grammar School and The Hutchins School in Hobart. He ran his father's election campaigns from a young age.

In 1934, Marriott moved to Melbourne to work for the Australian Broadcasting Commission (ABC), filling a role in its music library. He was later involved with ABC Sport and the ABC Military Band, but was retrenched in 1937. He returned to Tasmania and worked as a real estate agent in Burnie and for a chartered accountancy firm in Launceston.

== Military service ==
Marriott enlisted in the Citizen Military Forces in January 1939. He transferred to the Australian Imperial Force in June 1940 as a member of the 1st Corps of Signals. He served in the Middle East and on the New Guinea campaign. He was promoted to lieutenant in July 1942 and was discharged in October 1945 with the honorary rank of captain.

== Politics ==
=== Early involvement ===
Marriott joined the newly created Liberal Party upon his return to Australia. He was a paid organiser for the party in Tasmania from 1945 to 1949, moving to Hobart in 1946, and also worked as the party's state publicity officer and as a part-time secretary for Liberals MPs Charles Falkinder, Neil Campbell and Rex Townley.

=== Senator, 1953–1975 ===
Marriott was an unsuccessful Senate candidate at the 1951 federal election. He was appointed to the Senate by the parliament of Tasmania on 3 March 1953, filling the casual vacancy caused by the death of Jack Chamberlain. He was re-elected to a six-year Senate term at the 1953 half-Senate election, though under the constitutional provisions at the time his original appointment lapsed 8 May 1953 and his new term did not begin until 1 July 1953.

Marriott was re-elected at the 1958, 1964, 1970 and 1974 elections. His final term was cut short by a double dissolution after the dismissal of the Whitlam government. He failed to win Liberal preselection for the 1975 election. He stood unsuccessfully for the Tasmanian Legislative Council in 1976.

Marriott was active in the Senate committees system. He was a long-serving member of the Joint Standing Committee on the Australian Capital Territory, including two terms as chair. At the time the committee had a significant role in supervising the administration of Canberra, as the ACT had not yet achieved full self-government and the House of Assembly was only an advisory body. Marriott's views on Canberra were frequently reported by local newspapers, including his support for the introduction of Sunday trading, criticism of Canberra Airport, and support for the introduction of breathalysers. He crossed the floor to vote against the Gorton government's decision to close the Canberra abattoir. In 1970, The Canberra Times described him as "a watchdog and innovator in the administration of suburban Canberra and the national capital".

Marriott had a prominent role as Chair of the Senate Select Committee on Drug Trafficking and Drug Abuse from 1970 to 1971. The committee's report "advocated a humanitarian approach to the problems of addicts, while urging collaboration among Australian and international agencies to prevent trafficking", and opposed legalisation of illicit drugs. Marriott was critical of the Australian Medical Association's lack of engagement with the inquiry. In August 1971, he criticised some Australians for their "cruel, heartless outlook" towards drug addiction. Marriott himself suffered from alcohol addiction, which was publicly reported against his wishes, and was a member of Alcoholics Anonymous. He served as an assistant minister in the McMahon government from 1971 to 1972, assisting the Minister for Health.

== Personal life ==
In 1943, Marriott married Myra Viney, with whom he had one daughter. He was active in the Legacy Club, the synod of the Anglican Diocese of Tasmania, and the Australian American Association.

Marriott died in Hobart on 13 April 1994.
