= Reg Bishop =

Australian politician

The Honourable Reg Bishop AO
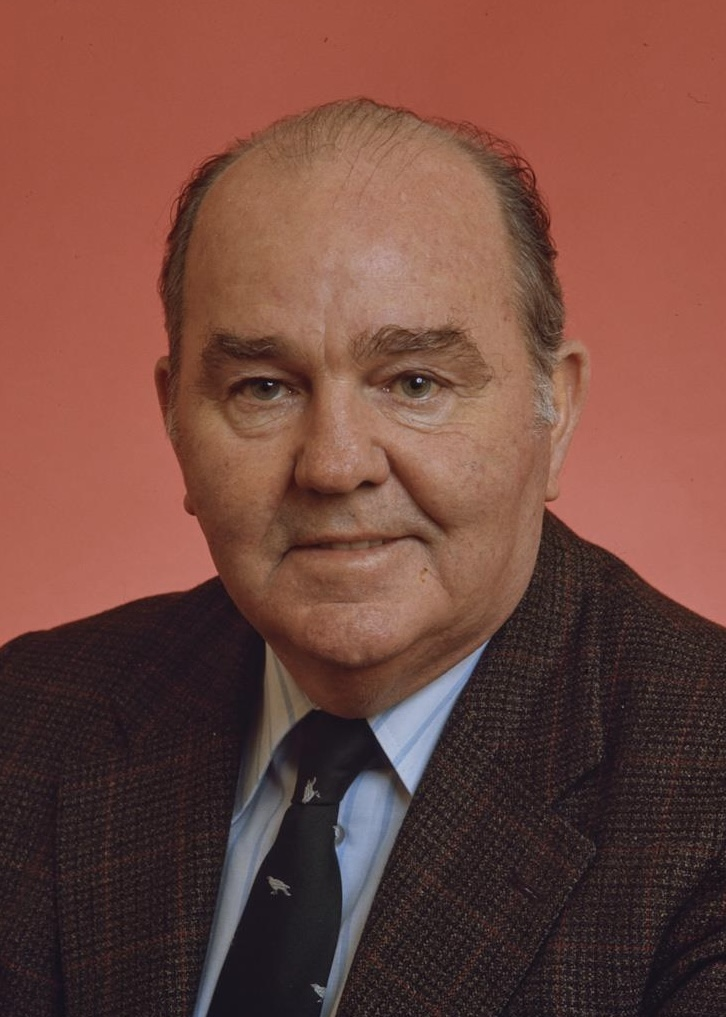
- Official portrait, 1974

Postmaster-General of Australia
- In office 12 June 1974 – 11 November 1975
- Prime Minister: Gough Whitlam
- Preceded by: Lionel Bowen
- Succeeded by: Peter Nixon

Minister for Repatriation
- In office 19 December 1972 – 12 June 1974
- Prime Minister: Gough Whitlam
- Preceded by: Lance Barnard
- Succeeded by: John Wheeldon

Senator for South Australia
- In office 1 July 1962 – 30 June 1981

Personal details
- Born: 4 February 1913 Adelaide, South Australia, Australia
- Died: 3 July 1999 (aged 86) Daw Park, South Australia, Australia
- Party: Labor

Reginald Bishop AO (4 February 1913 – 3 July 1999) was an Australian politician who served as a Senator for South Australia from 1962 to 1981. He was a member of the Australian Labor Party (ALP), and held office in the Whitlam government as Minister for Repatriation (1972–1974) and Postmaster-General (1974–1975).

== Early life ==
Bishop was born in Adelaide and left school at fifteen and became a clerk in the South Australian Railways at the Islington Railway Workshops. He was an official of the Australian Railways Union from 1937 until 1956 and Secretary of the South Australian Trades and Labour Council from 1956 until 1962. He enlisted in the Royal Australian Air Force during World War II and served from February 1943 until January 1946 in Darwin and Borneo.

== Politics ==
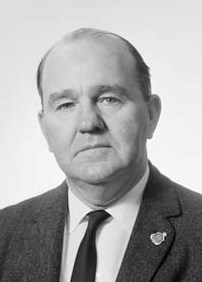
Bishop in 1963

Bishop was an Australian Labor Party Senator for South Australia from the 1961 elections until his retirement in June 1981. After the election of the Whitlam government at the 1972 elections, he was Minister for Repatriation and Minister assisting the Minister for Defence. From June 1974, he was the second last Postmaster-General and oversaw the creation of Telecom and Australia Post as statutory authorities, replacing the former Postmaster-General's Department. He also implemented the introduction of FM radio and the abolition of television and radio licence fees.

== Later life ==
Bishop was made an Officer of the Order of Australia in January 1984. He was survived by a daughter and son, but his wife of more than sixty years, Connie predeceased him in 1997.

Political offices
Preceded by Mac Holten	Minister for Repatriation; 1972–1974	Succeeded by John Wheeldon
Preceded by Lionel Bowen	Postmaster-General; 1974–1975	Succeeded by Peter Nixon
