= Ian Wood (politician) =

Australian politician

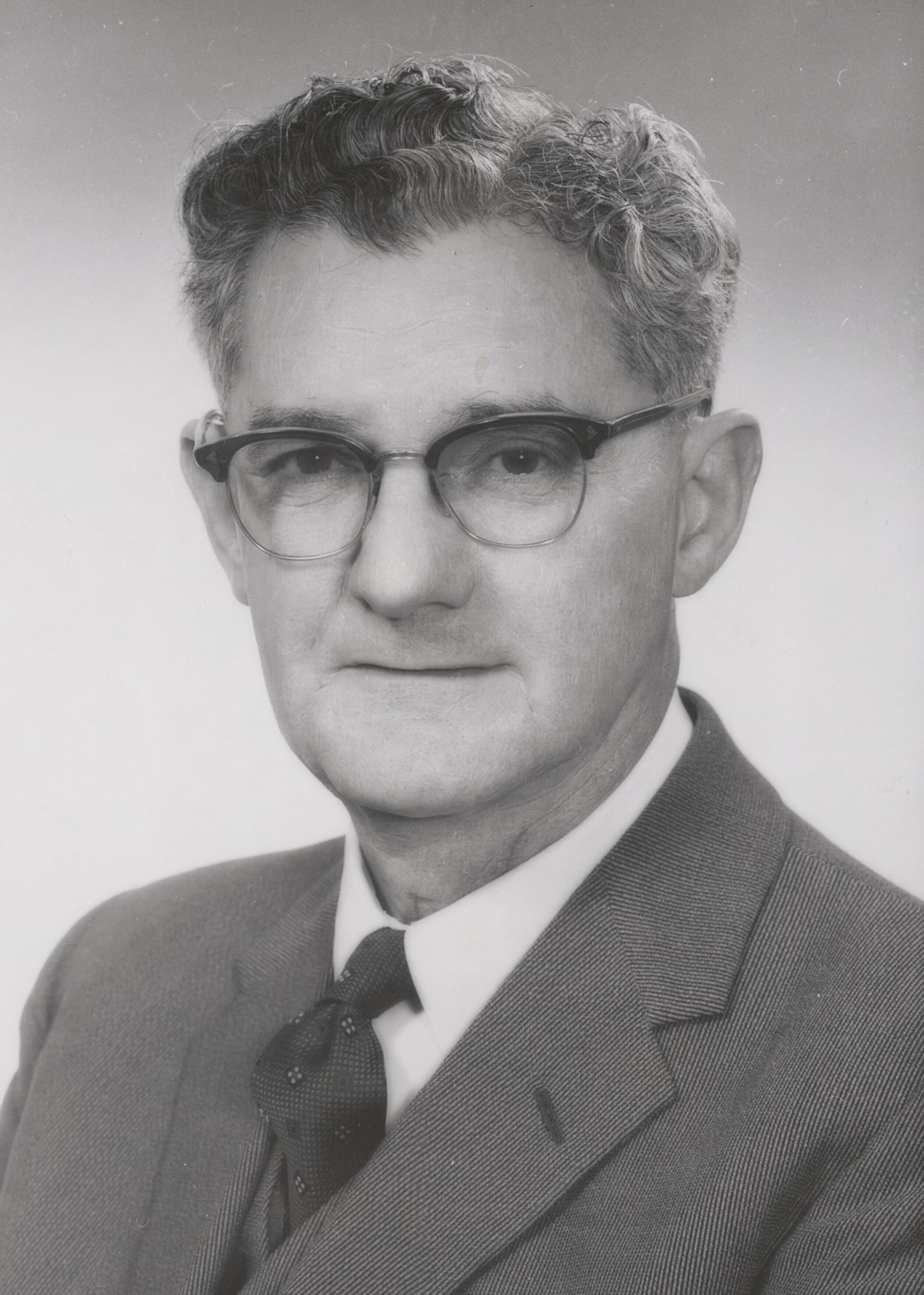

Senator for Queensland
- In office 22 February 1950 – 30 June 1978

Personal details
- Born: 31 January 1901 Mackay, Queensland
- Died: 7 January 1992 (aged 90) Mackay, Queensland
- Party: Liberal Party of Australia
- Occupation: Travel agent

Ian Alexander Christie Wood (31 January 1901 – 7 January 1992) was an Australian politician. Born at Mackay, Queensland, he was educated at state schools before becoming a travel agent. He served on Mackay City Council, including some years as mayor, 1930–1933, 1943–1953. He was also President of the Queensland Local Government Association and the Mackay Chamber of Commerce. In 1949, he was elected to the Australian Senate as a Liberal Senator for Queensland. He remained a Senator until his retirement in 1977, taking effect in 1978.

Wood died in 1992, aged 90.

According to the Australian Parliamentary Library, Wood crossed the floor 130 times during his career, the second-most out of any MP between 1950 and 2019 behind Reg Wright.
