= Bob Poke =

Australian politician

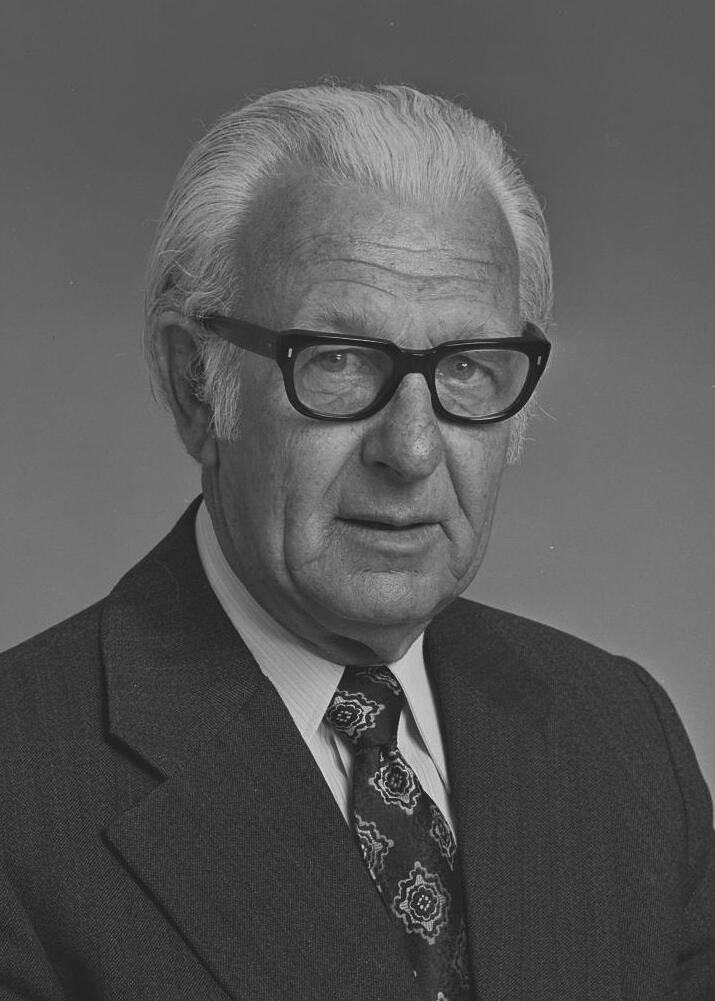
- Poke in 1974

Senator for Tasmania
- In office 1 July 1956 – 11 April 1974

Personal details
- Born: Albert George Poke; 16 February 1906 Somerset, Tasmania, Australia
- Died: 4 January 1989 (aged 82) Lenah Valley, Tasmania, Australia
- Party: Labor
- Spouse(s): Honora Roden (m. 1936; div. 1947) Alice Jacobs (m. 1947)
- Occupation: Engine driver, timber worker

Albert George "Bob" Poke (16 February 1906 – 4 January 1989) was an Australian politician and trade unionist. He was a member of the Australian Labor Party (ALP) and served as a Senator for Tasmania from 1956 to 1974. He was a long-serving officeholder in the Timber Workers' Union and Federated Miscellaneous Workers' Union.

== Early life ==
Poke was born on 16 February 1906 in Somerset, Tasmania. He was the second of nine children born to Georgina (née Burgess) and Alfred John Poke. His father worked as a labourer and stockman.

Poke was educated at state schools. He left school at a young age and by 1920 was working at a sawmill. During the Great Depression he was an itinerant bush worker. He worked in the timber industry in north-west Tasmania until the late 1940s, including as a timber mill foreman and engine-driver. During World War II he volunteered for military service but was deemed part of a "reserved occupation" and refused permission to enlist.

== Labour movement ==
In 1947, Poke was appointed as a paid organiser for the Timber Workers' Union (TWU) and moved to Launceston. He was secretary of the Launceston Trades Hall Council from 1949 to 1951, then moved to Hobart to become state secretary of the TWU. He was associated with the Hobart Trades Hall Council as president (1956-1957) and secretary (1957-1962) and was also state president of the Federated Miscellaneous Workers' Union from 1957 to 1972. His later career in the union movement overlapped with his parliamentary career and as a senator he maintained his office in the Hobart Trades Hall.

== Politics ==
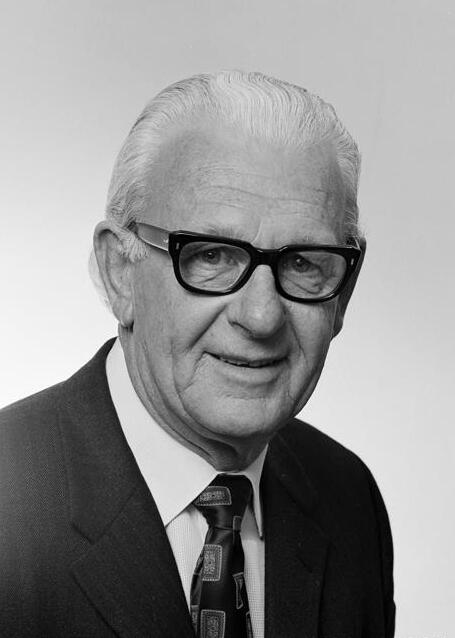
Poke in 1971

At the 1955 federal election, Poke was elected to a six-year Senate term beginning on 1 July 1956. He was re-elected at the 1961 and 1967 elections. His final term was cut short by a double dissolution on 18 May 1974 and he did not recontest his seat at the 1974 election. He had originally nominated for preselection, but withdrew due to illness.

Poke was the ALP's deputy whip in the Senate from 1962 to 1972 and also served as the ALP's state president (1967), federal senior vice-president (1971-1972) and state treasurer (1974-1975). He served on several Senate committees and in 1974 was notably the only member of the Joint Committee on the Broadcasting of Parliamentary Proceedings to oppose the televising of parliamentary proceedings. In the Senate, Poke spoke relatively infrequently but regularly asked parliamentary questions. He was "a left-wing activist in both the ALP and unions", speaking on behalf of the working class as well as being a strong opponent of Australian involvement in the Vietnam War.

In 1961, Poke attempted to move a motion expelling George Cole, an ALP defector and leader of the Democratic Labor Party, from parliament. His motion was in response to Cole's allegations that ALP MP Gil Duthie had been a member of the Australian Communist Party, which Poke described as "a mean, miserable, underhand attack without foundation". Poke in turn alleged that Cole had attended four meetings of the Communist Party himself.

== Personal life ==
In 1936, Poke married Honora Roden, with whom he had two sons. He was divorced in 1947 and remarried in the same year to Alice Jacobs, with whom he had one daughter. After leaving the Senate he retired to Glenorchy and Lauderdale. He died on 4 January 1989 in Calvary Hospital, Hobart.
