= 1970 Australian Senate election =

1970 parliamentary election for the Senate in Australia

- 21 November 1970

30 of the 60 seats in the Senate 31 seats needed for a majority
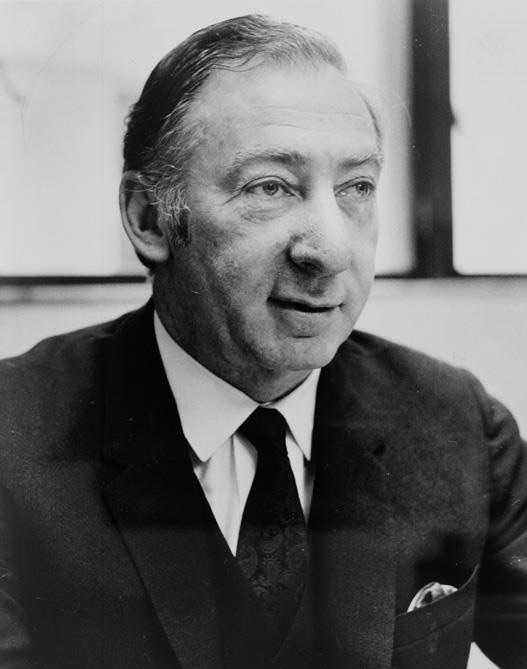

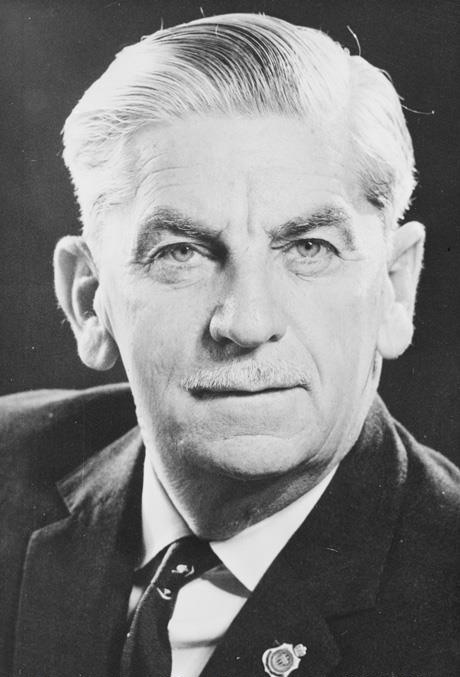

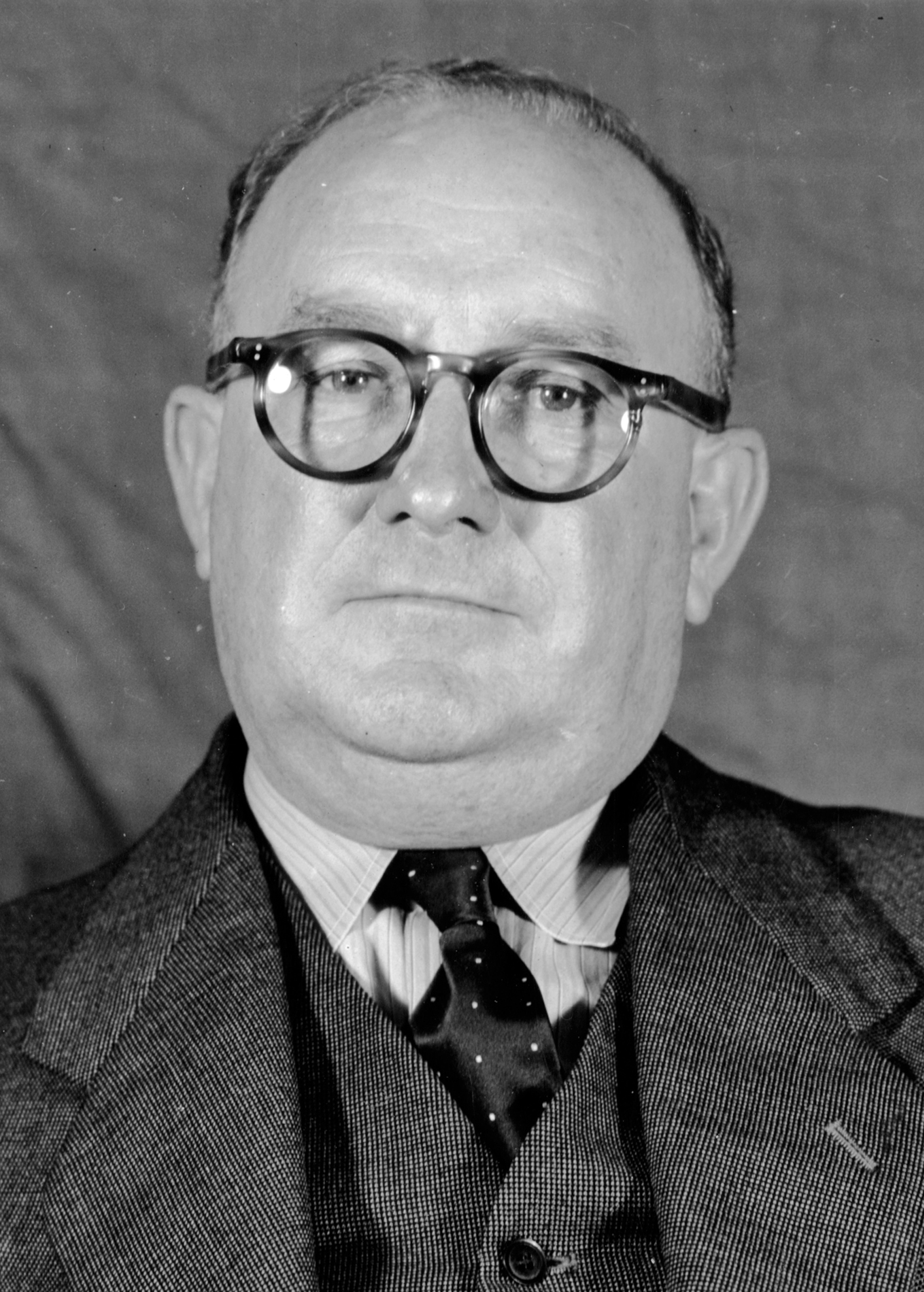
	First party	Second party	Third party
Leader	Lionel Murphy	Ken Anderson	Vince Gair
Party	Labor	Coalition	Democratic Labor
Leader since	8 February 1967	28 February 1968	23 June 1965
Leader's seat	New South Wales	New South Wales	Queensland
Seats won	14	13	3
Seats after	26	26	5
Seat change	▼1	▼2	▲1
Popular vote	2,376,215	2,149,023	625,142
Percentage	42.22%	38.18%	11.11%
Swing	▼2.81pp	▼4.59pp	▲1.34pp

An election was held on 21 November 1970 for 32 of the 60 seats in the Australian Senate. It is the most recent occasion on which a Senate election has been held without an accompanying election for the House of Representatives.

The election cycle for each house of the federal parliament had been out of synchronisation since prime minister Robert Menzies called the 1963 election for the House of Representatives a year ahead of schedule.

== Key dates ==
Date	Event
16 October 1970	Writs were issued by the respective State Governors to proceed with an election.
29 October 1970	Close of nominations, at 12pm.
21 November 1970	Polling day, between the hours of 8am and 6pm.
17 December 1970	Declaration of the poll for South Australia.
7 January 1971	Return of the writs.

== Results ==
The governing Coalition and the opposition Australian Labor Party won 13 and 14 seats respectively, giving them a total of 26 seats each. The Democratic Labor Party increased its Senate representation by one, and two new independents won seats.

Senate (STV) — 1970–74—Turnout 93.98% (CV) — Informal 9.41%
Party	Votes	%	Swing	Seats won	Seats held	Change
Labor	2,376,215	42.22	–2.81	14	26	–1
Liberal–Country coalition (total)	2,149,023	38.18	–4.59	13	26	–2
Liberal–Country joint ticket	1,098,134	19.51	–14.31	4	*	*
Liberal	991,473	17.61	+9.47	8	21	0
Country	59,416	1.06	+0.24	1	5	–2
Democratic Labor	625,142	11.11	+1.34	3	5	+1
Australia	163,343	2.90	+2.90	0	0	0
Better Education Committee	59,813	1.06	+1.06	0	0	0
Democratic	52,799	0.94	+0.94	0	0	0
Pensioner Power	28,983	0.51	+0.51	0	0	0
Defence of Government Schools	27,796	0.49	+0.49	0	0	0
National Socialist	24,017	0.43	+0.43	0	0	0
Conservative Immigration Movement	4,864	0.08	+0.08	0	0	0
Independent	116,838	2.07	+0.37	2	3	+2
Total	5,628,833			32	60	

Notes

- In New South Wales and Queensland, the coalition parties ran a joint ticket. Of the four senators elected on a joint ticket, three were members of the Liberal Party and one was a member of the Country Party. In Western Australia, the coalition parties ran on separate tickets. In South Australia, Tasmania, and Victoria, only the Liberal Party ran a ticket.
- Two independents were elected – Michael Townley of Tasmania and Syd Negus of Western Australia. This brought the total number of independents in the Senate to three, the other being Reg Turnbull of Tasmania.

== See also ==
- Candidates of the Australian Senate election, 1970
- Members of the Australian Senate, 1971–1974
