= 1966 Australian Senate election =

Australian federal election

← 1964	26 November 1966	1967 →

6 of the 60 seats in the Senate 31 seats needed for a majority
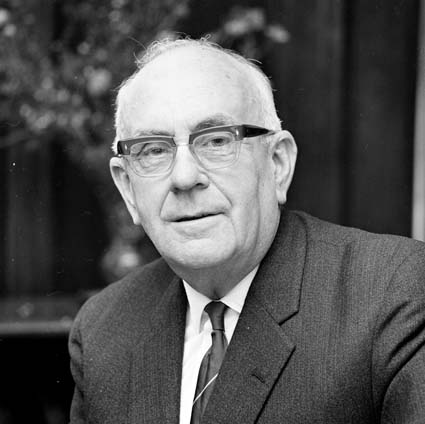

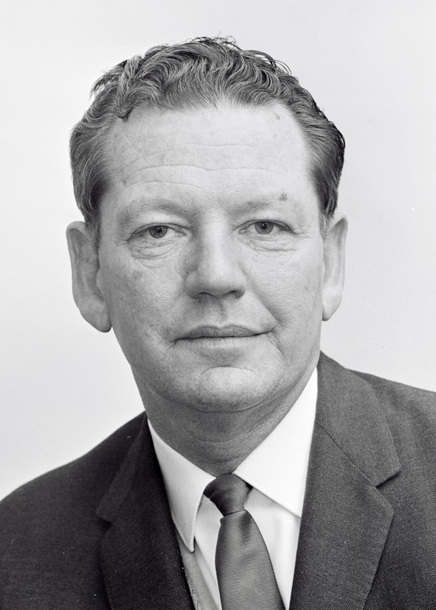

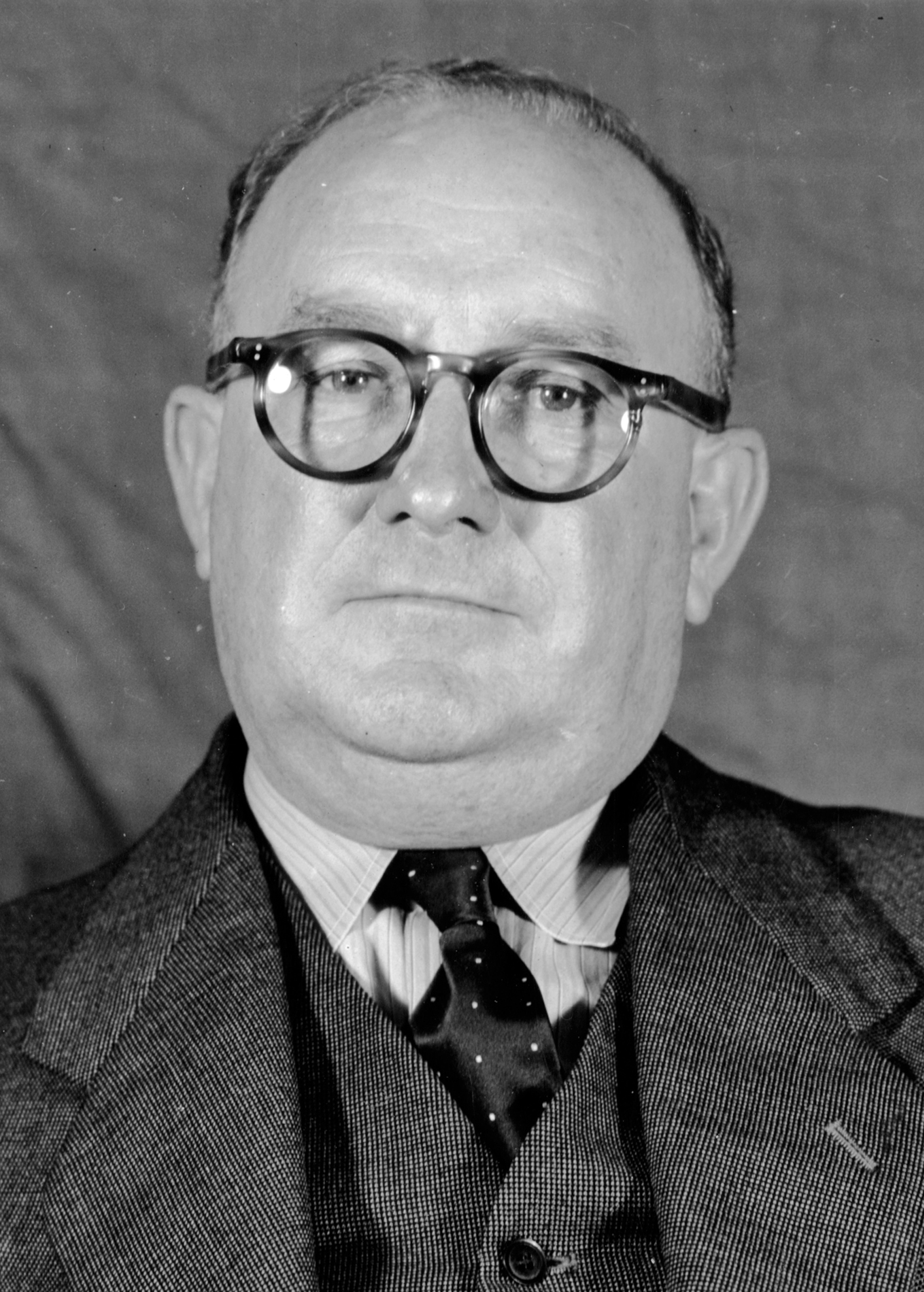
	First party	Second party	Third party
Leader	Denham Henty	Don Willesee	Vince Gair
Party	Coalition	Labor	DLP
Leader's seat	Tasmania	Western Australia	Queensland
Seats before	30	27	2
Seats won	4	2	0
Seats after	29	28	2
Seat change	▼1	▲1	Steady
Popular vote	2,406,768	1,897,049	421,959
Percentage	50.04%	39.45%	8.77%
Swing	▲4.30pp	▼5.21pp	▲0.38pp

Special Senate elections were held on 26 November 1966 to elect members to fill casual vacancies in the Australian Senate for the states of New South Wales, Victoria, Queensland and Western Australia.

Prior to 29 July 1977, the filing of casual vacancies was complex. While senators were elected for a six-year term, people appointed to a casual vacancy only held office until the earlier of the next election for the House of Representatives or the Senate, at which the vacancy would be filled by the electors of the relevant state.

This was one of the few occasions in which there was a special election for the Senate, as the House of Representatives and Senate elections had got out of synchronisation as a result of Robert Menzies calling an early House-only election in 1963.

Because of the loss of a seat in Western Australia, the Coalition held less than half of the seats in the chamber; the Democratic Labor Party and independent senator Reg Turnbull held the balance of power.

== Australia ==
Senate (STV) — 1966—Turnout 95.05% (CV) — Informal 5.34%
Party	Votes	%	Swing	Seats won	Seats held	Change
Liberal	1,645,319	34.21		3	22	▼1
Country	761,449	15.83		1	7	Steady
Coalition total	2,406,768	50.040		4	29	▼1
Labor	1,897,049	39.45		2	28	▲1
Democratic Labor	421,959	8.77		−	2	Steady
Liberal Reform Group	43,716	0.91				
Independent	39,799	0.83			1	Steady
Total	4,809,291			6	54	

== New South Wales ==
1966 Australian federal election: Senate special, New South Wales
Party	Candidate	Votes	%	±%
Quota		1,046,934		
Liberal	Bob Cotton (re-elected 1)	1,056,968	50.48	
Labor	Clive Evatt	908,763	43.40	
Democratic Labor	Gwynydd Meredith	128,136	6.12	
Total formal votes		2,093,867	95.75	
Informal votes		92,949	4.25	
Turnout		2,186,816	94.72	

== Queensland ==
1966 Australian federal election: Senate special, Queensland
Party	Candidate	Votes	%	±%
Quota		417,438		
Liberal	Bill Heatley (re-elected)	426,726	51.11	
Labor	Bertie Milliner	328,289	39.32	
Democratic Labor	Rogers Judge	62,870	7.53	
Independent	Ian Kent	16,989	2.03	
Total formal votes		834,874	97.32	
Informal votes		22,956	2.68	
Turnout		857,830	95.26	

== Victoria ==
1966 Australian federal election: Senate special, Victoria
Party	Candidate	Votes	%	±%
Quota		593,218		
Country	1. James Webster (re-elected 1); 2. Lloyd Atkin	761,449	50.26	
Labor	1. George Poyser (re-elected 2); 2. Giuseppe Di Salvo	507,188	33.48	
Democratic Labor	1. Jack Little; 2. Frank Dowling	190,681	12.59	
Liberal Reform Group	1. Edwin Ryan	43,716	2.89	
Independent	1. Kenneth Nolan; 2. Laurence Hoult	11,933	0.79	
Total formal votes		4,152,524	95.83	
Informal votes		180,743	4.17	
Turnout		4,333,267	93.98	

== Western Australia ==
1966 Australian federal election: Senate special, Western Australia
Party	Candidate	Votes	%	±%
Quota		121,862		
Liberal	1. Peter Sim (re-elected 1); 2. Reg Withers (defeated); 3. Victor Garland	161,625	44.21	
Labor	1. Laurie Wilkinson (elected 2); 2. John Henshaw	152,809	41.80	
Democratic Labor	1. Mark Briffa; 2. Lydia Obbes	40,272	11.02	
Independent	1. Frederick Simpson; 2. John Huelin	10,877	2.98	
Total formal votes		365,583	89.26	
Informal votes		43,987	10.74	
Turnout		409,570	94.57	

== Changing seats ==
State	1963 election			Appointment			1966 Election	
State	Party	Member	Term	Party	Member	Date	Member	Party
New South Wales	Liberal	Bill Spooner	1963-1968	Liberal	Bob Cotton	4 August 1965	Bob Cotton	Liberal
Victoria	Labor	Charles Sandford	1963-1968	Labor	George Poyser	26 October 1966	George Poyser	Labor
Victoria	Country	Harrie Wade	1963-1968	Country	James Webster	9 December 1964	James Webster	Country
Queensland	Liberal	Bob Sherrington	1963-1968	Liberal	Bill Heatley	14 April 1966	Bill Heatley	Liberal
Western Australia	Liberal	Sir Shane Paltridge	1963-1968	Liberal	Reg Withers	17 February 1966	Laurie Wilkinson	Labor
Western Australia	Liberal	Seddon Vincent	1963-1968	Liberal	Peter Sim	26 November 1964	Peter Sim	Liberal

== See also ==
- Candidates of the 1966 Australian federal election
- Members of the Australian Senate, 1965–1968
