= Candidates of the 1966 Australian federal election =

This article provides information on candidates who stood for the 1966 Australian federal election. The election was held on 26 November 1966.

== Retiring Members ==
=== Labor ===
- Jock Nelson MP (Northern Territory, NT)
- Bill Riordan MP (Kennedy, Qld)

=== Liberal ===
- Frank Davis MP (Deakin, Vic)
- Bill Falkinder MP (Franklin, Tas)
- William Jack MP (North Sydney, NSW)
- Robert Lindsay MP (Flinders, Vic)
- Dan Mackinnon MP (Corangamite, Vic)
- Sir John McLeay MP (Boothby, SA)
- Sir Keith Wilson MP (Sturt, SA)

=== Country ===
- Wilfred Brimblecombe MP (Maranoa, Qld)

== House of Representatives ==
Sitting members at the time of the election are shown in bold text. Successful candidates are highlighted in the relevant colour. Where there is possible confusion, an asterisk (*) is also used.

=== Australian Capital Territory ===
Electorate	Held by	Labor candidate	Liberal candidate	DLP candidate	Independent candidate
Australian Capital Territory	Labor	**Jim Fraser**	Robert Rowell	John Donohue	Anne Dalgarno; Robert Greenish

=== New South Wales ===
Electorate	Held by	Labor candidate	Coalition candidate	DLP candidate	Other candidates
Banks	Labor	**Eric Costa**	Herman Tibben (Lib)	Norma Boyle	Harry Hatfield (CPA)
Barton	Labor	**Len Reynolds**	Bill Arthur (Lib)	Phillip Kennedy	Charles Bellchambers (Ind)
Bennelong	Liberal	Geoffrey O'Donnell	**Sir John Cramer** (Lib)	Edward Connolly	Robert Turner (LRG)
Blaxland	Labor	**Eric Harrison**	Robert Lovell (Lib)	Terence Keenan	
Bradfield	Liberal	William Bramwell	**Harry Turner** (Lib)	Allan Dwyer	
Calare	Country	William Stavert	**John England** (CP)	John Grant	
Cowper	Country	Burwood Gillett	**Ian Robinson** (CP)		William Tredinnick (LRG)
Cunningham	Labor	**Rex Connor**	John Poel (Lib)		Jeffrey Fenton (Ind); Victor Kearney (Ind); Reg Wilding (CPA)
Dalley	Labor	**William O'Connor**	Elton Lewis (Lib)	John Kavanagh	
Darling	Labor	**Joe Clark**	Allan Connell (Lib)		
East Sydney	Labor	**Len Devine**	William Berman (Lib)	Mel Antcliff	Bill Brown (CPA)
Eden-Monaro	Labor	**Allan Fraser**	Dugald Munro* (Lib); Tony Pratten (CP)	John Mills	
Evans	Liberal	James Monaghan	**Malcolm Mackay** (Lib)	Francis Collins	John Gunn (LRG)
Farrer	Liberal	Alan Thomson	**David Fairbairn** (Lib)	James Keogh	
Grayndler	Labor	**Fred Daly**	Basil Mottershead (Lib)	Lyle Antcliff	
Gwydir	Country	Reginald Lang	**Ian Allan** (CP)		
Hughes	Labor	**Les Johnson**	Don Dobie (Lib)	William Goslett	
Hume	Country	John Menadue	**Ian Pettitt** (CP)	John Hogan	
Hunter	Labor	**Bert James**	William Gilchrist (Lib)	Donald Richards	
Kingsford-Smith	Labor	**Dan Curtin**	Nancy Wake (Lib)	Cornelius Woodbury	
Lang	Labor	**Frank Stewart**	Graham Crawford (Lib)	Bernard Atkinson	
Lawson	Country	John Canobi	**Laurie Failes** (CP)	Mario Morandini	
Lowe	Liberal	Peter Dunn	**William McMahon** (Lib)	Anthony Rooney	Francis James (LRG)
Lyne	Country	John Allan	**Philip Lucock** (CP)		Joe Cordner (Ind); William Power (Ind)
Macarthur	Liberal	Patrick O'Halloran	**Jeff Bate** (Lib)	Albert Perish	Ronald Sarina (Ind); John Souter (Ind)
Mackellar	Liberal	Kenneth McLean	**Bill Wentworth** (Lib)	Philip Cohen	Peter Allison (LRG)
Macquarie	Labor	**Tony Luchetti**	John Heesh (Lib)	Richard Ambrose	Allan Fuary (Ind)
Mitchell	Liberal	Peter McLoughlin	**Les Irwin** (Lib)	Andrew Diehm	Francis Bonnor (Ind); Michael Deecke (Ind); Alan Jones (Ind); Kevin Martin (Ind); William Murray (Ind); Dennis Rees (Ind)
New England	Country	John Affleck	**Ian Sinclair** (CP)		
Newcastle	Labor	**Charles Jones**	Frances Clack (Lib)	Jack Collins	Warren Bridge (Ind)
North Sydney	Liberal	Jack Grahame	Bill Graham (Lib)	Edmund Bateman	Joyce Duncan (Ind); Nicholas Gorshenin (Ind); Romualds Kemps (Ind); Frederick Simpson (LRG); David Wall (Ind)
Parkes	Liberal	Doug Sutherland	**Tom Hughes** (Lib)	Kevin Davis	John Crew (LRG)
Parramatta	Liberal	Barry Wilde	**Nigel Bowen** (Lib)	Edward Beck	Kenneth Cook (LRG); Paul Nolan (Ind)
Paterson	Liberal	Francis Murray	**Allen Fairhall** (Lib)	Aubrey Barr	
Phillip	Liberal	Brian O'Kane	**William Aston** (Lib)	Dominique Droulers	John Hannan (Ind)
Reid	Labor	**Tom Uren**	Stanislaus Kelly (Lib)	Mick Carroll	
Richmond	Country	Ernest Jones	**Doug Anthony** (CP)		Keith Compton (Ind)
Riverina	Country	Patrick Newman; Arthur Solly	**Bill Armstrong** (CP)	Leslie Kennedy	
Robertson	Liberal	William Smith	**William Bridges-Maxwell** (Lib)	Michael Dwyer	Percival McPherson (LRG)
St George	Liberal	Malcolm Cameron	**Len Bosman** (Lib)	Hans Andreasson	John Mant (LRG)
Shortland	Labor	**Charles Griffiths**	Malcolm Blackshaw (Lib)	Robert Burke	Geoff Curthoys (CPA); Stanley Millington (Ind)
Warringah	Liberal	Jim McClelland	Edward St John (Lib)	Francis Hicks	Keith Chambers (Ind); Eric Riches (Ind)
Watson	Labor	**Jim Cope**	Peter Lowe (Lib)	Thomas Colman	
Wentworth	Liberal	Kerry Sibraa	**Les Bury** (Lib)	Doris Brown	Brian King (Ind); Jack Mundey (CPA)
Werriwa	Labor	**Gough Whitlam**	Elga Rodze (Lib)	Andrew Murphy	Les Kelton (CPA)
West Sydney	Labor	**Dan Minogue**	Albert Curtin (Lib)	Denise Clancy	Ron Maxwell (CPA)

=== Northern Territory ===
Electorate	Held by	Labor candidate	Country candidate
Northern Territory	Labor	Richard Ward	Sam Calder

=== Queensland ===
Electorate	Held by	Labor candidate	Coalition candidate	DLP candidate	Other candidates
Bowman	Liberal	Jack Comber	**Wylie Gibbs** (Lib)	Paul Tucker	
Brisbane	Labor	**Manfred Cross**	Brian Perkins (Lib)	Patrick Hallinan	
Capricornia	Labor	**George Gray**	Neil McKendry (Lib)	Peter Boyle	
Darling Downs	Liberal	Desmond Hare	**Reginald Swartz** (Lib)	Francis Mullins	
Dawson	Labor	**Rex Patterson**	John Fordyce (CP)	Bernard Lewis	
Fisher	Country	Alfred Walker	**Charles Adermann** (CP)	Robert Barron	
Griffith	Labor	**Wilfred Coutts**	Don Cameron (Lib)	John Fitz-Gibbon	Vic Slater (CPA)
Herbert	Labor	**Ted Harding**	Robert Bonnett (Lib)	Kiernan Dorney	
Kennedy	Labor	Barry Dittmer	Bob Katter (CP)	Edward Bennett	John Donaldson (Ind)
Leichhardt	Labor	**Bill Fulton**	Michael Turner (CP)	Geoffrey Higham	
Lilley	Liberal	Frank Melit	**Kevin Cairns** (Lib)	Reginald Lincoln	Sarah Ross (Ind)
McPherson	Country	Allan Swinton	**Charles Barnes** (CP)	Frederick Burges	Harold Brennan (Ind)
Maranoa	Country	Jack Tonkin	James Corbett (CP)	Bryan Hurley	
Moreton	Liberal	Len Keogh	**James Killen** (Lib)	Miroslav Jansky	
Oxley	Labor	**Bill Hayden**	Stewart Fletcher (CP); Colin Logan (Lib)	Thomas Dalton	
Petrie	Liberal	Reginald O'Brien	**Alan Hulme** (Lib)	Thomas Grundy	Francis O'Mara (Ind)
Ryan	Liberal	Donald Jeffries	**Nigel Drury** (Lib)	Brian O'Brien	John Thurwall (Ind)
Wide Bay	Labor	**Brendan Hansen**	Albert White (CP)	William Hutchinson	

=== South Australia ===
Electorate	Held by	Labor candidate	Liberal candidate	DLP candidate	Other candidates
Adelaide	Labor	**Joe Sexton**	Andrew Jones	George Basisovs	
Angas	Liberal	Robert Nielsen	**Geoffrey Giles**		
Barker	Liberal	Norman Alcock	**Jim Forbes**		Don Jarrett (CPA)
Bonython	Labor	**Martin Nicholls**	John Kershaw	Edward Timlin	Luke Horan (SCP)
Boothby	Liberal	Thomas Sheehy	John McLeay	Ted Farrell	
Grey	Labor	**Jack Mortimer**	Don Jessop	Douglas Barnes	
Hindmarsh	Labor	**Clyde Cameron**	Ross Stanford	Cyril Holasek	
Kingston	Labor	**Pat Galvin**	Kay Brownbill	Allan Anderson	
Port Adelaide	Labor	**Fred Birrell**	Peter Balnaves	Michael Bowler	Denis McEvoy (SCP); Jim Moss (CPA)
Sturt	Liberal	Keith Le Page	Ian Wilson	Walter Doran	
Wakefield	Liberal	John Phelan	**Bert Kelly**		

=== Tasmania ===
Electorate	Held by	Labor candidate	Liberal candidate	DLP candidate	Communist candidate
Bass	Labor	**Lance Barnard**	Timothy Barrenger	Richard Delany	
Braddon	Labor	**Ron Davies**	Paul Fenton	John Chapman-Mortimer	
Denison	Liberal	Neil Batt	**Adrian Gibson**	Harold Grace	Max Bound
Franklin	Liberal	John Parsons	Thomas Pearsall	John Lynch	
Wilmot	Labor	**Gil Duthie**	Donald Paterson	Robert Wright	

=== Victoria ===
Electorate	Held by	Labor candidate	Coalition candidate	DLP candidate	LRG candidate	Other candidates
Balaclava	Liberal	Leo Richards	**Ray Whittorn** (Lib)	Ralph James	Brian McLure	
Ballaarat	Liberal	David Pollock	**Dudley Erwin** (Lib)	Bob Joshua		
Batman	Labor	John Andersen	Bruce Skeggs (Lib)	Henry Darroch	Robert Desailly	**Sam Benson** (Ind)
Bendigo	Labor	**Noel Beaton**	Frank Dunphy (Lib)	Bill Drechsler		
Bruce	Liberal	Leslie Donnelly	**Billy Snedden** (Lib)	Henri de Sachau	Herbert Wessley	Ralph Gibson (CPA); John Saunderson (Ind)
Chisholm	Liberal	Kenneth Grigg	**Sir Wilfrid Kent Hughes** (Lib)	Mary Stanley		Clive Malseed (Ind)
Corangamite	Liberal	Lindsay Romey	Gilbert Anderson (CP); Tony Street* (Lib)	Brian Cronin		
Corio	Liberal	Gordon Scholes	**Hubert Opperman** (Lib)	James Mahoney	William Dobell	Elsie Brushfield (Ind)
Darebin	Labor	**Frank Courtnay**	Noel Stubbs (Lib)	Tom Andrews		
Deakin	Liberal	David McKenzie	Alan Jarman (Lib)	Maurice Weston	Michael Degendorfer	
Fawkner	Liberal	Robert Vernon	**Peter Howson** (Lib)	Yvonne Abolins	George Gabriel	Anthony Sanders (Ind)
Flinders	Liberal	Ian Boraston	Phillip Lynch (Lib)	John Cass		George Brunning (Ind)
Gellibrand	Labor	**Hector McIvor**	John McArthur (Lib)	Robin Thomas		Ian Daykin (CPA)
Gippsland	Country	Thomas Powell	**Peter Nixon** (CP)	John Hansen		
Henty	Liberal	Maureen Campbell-Teich	**Max Fox** (Lib)	Henry Moore		
Higgins	Liberal	Bruce Phayer	**Harold Holt** (Lib)	Frederick Skinner		
Higinbotham	Liberal	Reginald Butler	**Don Chipp** (Lib)	William Cameron	John Little	John A'Murray (ARP)
Indi	Country	William O'Neill	**Mac Holten*** (CP); James Stewart (Lib)	Christopher Cody		
Isaacs	Liberal	Peter Wilkinson	**William Haworth** (Lib)	John Hughes		
Kooyong	Liberal	William Cooper	**Andrew Peacock** (Lib)	Bernie Gaynor		
La Trobe	Liberal	Don Pritchard	**John Jess** (Lib)	Kevin Adamson	Leonard Weber	
Lalor	Labor	**Reg Pollard**	Mervyn Lee (Lib)	Jim Marmion	Victor Parsons	Paul de Tert (Ind); Peter Spencer (Ind); Michael Wood (Ind)
Mallee	Country	Hibbe Draaisma	**Winton Turnbull** (CP)	John Carty		
Maribyrnong	Liberal	John O'Brien	**Philip Stokes** (Lib)	Barry O'Brien		Lance Hutchinson (Ind)
McMillan	Liberal	Eric Kent	**Alex Buchanan** (Lib)	Les Hilton		Thomas Yates (Ind)
Melbourne	Labor	**Arthur Calwell**	Donald Gibson (Lib)	James Whitehead		Ronald Batey (Ind)
Melbourne Ports	Labor	**Frank Crean**	Richard Thomas (Lib)	George O'Dwyer		David Clark (CPA)
Murray	Country	Mervyn Huggins	**John McEwen** (CP)	Brian Lacey		
Scullin	Labor	**Ted Peters**	Ronald Hay (Lib)	Peter McCabe		John Daley (Ind)
Wannon	Liberal	Cyril Primmer	**Malcolm Fraser** (Lib)	Terence Callander		
Wills	Labor	**Gordon Bryant**	David Hutchinson (Lib)	John Flint		
Wimmera	Country	George Jeffs	Wilson Bolton (Lib); **Robert King*** (CP)	Bruno d'Elia		
Yarra	Labor	**Jim Cairns**	Lionel Hawkins (Lib)	Stan Keon		Bruno Bonomo (Ind)

=== Western Australia ===
Electorate	Held by	Labor candidate	Coalition candidate	DLP candidate	Communist candidate
Canning	Country	Charles Edwards	**John Hallett*** (CP); Norman Snow (Lib)	Bryan Finlay	
Curtin	Labor	John Brind	**Paul Hasluck** (Lib)	Francis Dwyer	
Forrest	Liberal	Frank Kirwan	**Gordon Freeth** (Lib)	Maurice Bailey	
Fremantle	Labor	**Kim Beazley**	John Waghorne (Lib)	John Martyr	Paddy Troy
Kalgoorlie	Labor	**Fred Collard**	Grahame Jonas (Lib)	Geoffrey Sands	
Moore	Country	Mal Bryce	Harold Lundy (Lib); **Don Maisey*** (CP)	Gavin O'Connor	
Perth	Liberal	Alan Bate	**Fred Chaney** (Lib)	George Mazak	Annette Aarons
Stirling	Labor	**Harry Webb**	Doug Cash (Lib)	Frank Pownall	
Swan	Liberal	Edward Gillett	**Richard Cleaver** (Lib)	Alan Crofts	

== Senate ==
Sitting Senators are shown in bold text. Tickets that elected at least one Senator are highlighted in the relevant colour. Successful candidates are identified by an asterisk (*).

=== New South Wales ===
A special election was held in New South Wales to fill the vacancy caused by the resignation of Liberal Senator Sir William Spooner. Bob Cotton, also of the Liberal Party, had been appointed to this vacancy in the interim period.

Labor candidate	Liberal candidate	DLP candidate
1. Clive Evatt	1. **Bob Cotton***	1. Gwynydd Meredith

=== Queensland ===
A special election was held in Queensland to fill the vacancy caused by the death of Liberal Senator Bob Sherrington. Bill Heatley, also of the Liberal Party, had been appointed to this vacancy in the interim period.

Labor candidate	Liberal candidate	DLP candidate	Independent candidate
1. Bertie Milliner	1. **Bill Heatley***	1. Rogers Judge	1. Ian Kent

=== Victoria ===
Two special elections were held in Victoria to fill the vacancies caused by the deaths of Labor Senator Charles Sandford and Country Party Senator Harrie Wade. George Poyser, also of the Labor Party, and James Webster, of the Country Party, had been appointed to these vacancies in the interim period.

Labor candidates	Country candidates	DLP candidates	Group D candidates	Ungrouped candidates
1. **George Poyser***; 2. Giuseppe Di Salvo	1. **James Webster***; 2. Lloyd Atkin	1. Jack Little; 2. Frank Dowling	1. Kenneth Nolan; 2. Laurence Hoult	Edwin Ryan (LRG)

=== Western Australia ===
Two special elections were held in Western Australia to fill the vacancies caused by the deaths of Liberal Senators Sir Shane Paltridge and Seddon Vincent. Peter Sim and Reg Withers, both also of the Liberal Party, had been appointed to these vacancies in the interim period.

Labor candidates	Liberal candidates	DLP candidates	Ungrouped candidates
1. Laurie Wilkinson*; 2. John Henshaw	1. **Peter Sim***; 2. **Reg Withers**; 3. Victor Garland	1. Mark Briffa; 2. Lydia Obbes	Frederick Simpson; John Huelin

== Summary by party ==
Beside each party is the number of seats contested by that party in the House of Representatives for each state, as well as an indication of whether the party contested special Senate elections in New South Wales, Victoria, Queensland and Western Australia.

Party	NSW		Vic		Qld		WA		SA	Tas	ACT	NT	Total	
Party	HR	S	HR	S	HR	S	HR	S	HR	HR	HR	HR	HR	S
Australian Labor Party	47	*	33	*	18	*	9	*	11	5	1	1	125	4
Liberal Party of Australia	38	*	30	*	11		9	*	11	5	1		105	3
Australian Country Party	10		6		8	*	2					1	27	1
Democratic Labor Party	39	*	33	*	18	*	9	*	8	5	1		113	4
Liberal Reform Group	10		9	*									19	1
Communist Party of Australia	7		3		1		2		2	1			16	
Social Credit Party									2				2	
Australian Republican Party			1										1	
Independent and other	26		14		5						2		47	

== See also ==
- 1966 Australian federal election
- 1966 Australian Senate election
- Members of the Australian House of Representatives, 1963–1966
- Members of the Australian House of Representatives, 1966–1969
- List of political parties in Australia
