= Members of the Australian Senate, 1965–1968 =

Senate composition at 1 July 1965
Government (30) - (1 seat minority)
Liberal (23) (Note: At the November 1966 House of Representatives election Liberal Senator Reg Withers was defeated for a casual vacancy by Labor candidate Laurie Wilkinson.)
Country Party (7)

Opposition (27)
Labor (27)

Crossbench (3)
DLP (2)
Independents (1)

Changes in composition

This is a list of members of the Australian Senate from 1965 to 1968. Half of its members were elected at the 9 December 1961 election and had terms starting on 1 July 1962 and finishing on 30 June 1968; the other half were elected at the 5 December 1964 half Senate election and had terms starting on 1 July 1965 and finishing on 30 June 1971. The process for filling casual vacancies was complex. While senators were elected for a six-year term, people appointed to a casual vacancy only held office until the earlier of the next election for the House of Representatives or the Senate.

Senator	Party	State	Term ending	Years in office
Ken Anderson	Liberal	New South Wales	1971	1953–1975
Archie Benn	Labor	Queensland	1968	1950–1968
Reg Bishop	Labor	South Australia	1968	1962–1981
George Branson	Liberal	Western Australia	1971	1958–1971
Marie Breen	Liberal	Victoria	1968	1962–1968
Tom Bull	Country	New South Wales	1971	1965–1971
Harry Cant	Labor	Western Australia	1971	1959–1974
Jim Cavanagh	Labor	South Australia	1968	1962–1981
Sam Cohen	Labor	Victoria	1968	1962–1969
Walter Cooper (Note: Father of the Senate)	Country	Queensland	1968	1928–1932, 1935–1968
Magnus Cormack	Liberal	Victoria	1968	1951–1953, 1962–1978
Bob Cotton (Note: Liberal Senator Bill Spooner resigned on 14 July 1965; Liberal member Bob Cotton was appointed to fill the ensuing vacancy on 4 August and served to the November 1966 House of Representatives election, when he was elected to complete the term until 30 June 1968.)	Liberal	New South Wales	1966, (Note: Appointed to a casual vacancy and only held office until the earlier of the next election for the House of Representatives or the Senate.) 1968	1965–1978
Gordon Davidson	Liberal	South Australia	1971	1961, 1962, 1965–1981
Don Devitt	Labor	Tasmania	1971	1965–1978
Felix Dittmer	Labor	Queensland	1971	1959–1971
Tom Drake-Brockman	Country	Western Australia	1971	1958, 1959–1978
Arnold Drury	Labor	South Australia	1971	1959–1975
Joe Fitzgerald	Labor	New South Wales	1968	1962–1974
Vince Gair	Democratic Labor	Queensland	1971	1965–1974
John Gorton (Note: Liberal Senator John Gorton was sworn in as Prime Minister on 10 January 1968 after the disappearance of Harold Holt and is the only senator to be Prime Minister. Convention required the Prime Minister to be a member of the House of Representatives and Gorton resigned from the Senate on 1 February 1968 to successfully contest Holt's old seat. Liberal member Ivor Greenwood was appointed to fill the ensuing Senate vacancy on 21 February until a special election at the October 1969 House of Representatives election, when he was elected to complete the term until 30 June 1971.)	Liberal	Victoria	1971	1950–1968
Ivor Greenwood	Liberal	Victoria	1969, 1971	1968–1976
Clive Hannaford (Note: Liberal Senator Clive Hannaford died on 24 October 1967; Liberal member Condor Laucke was appointed to fill the ensuing vacancy on 2 November to complete the term until 30 June 1968.)	Liberal	South Australia	1968	1950–1967
Bill Heatley (Note: Liberal Senator Bob Sherrington died on 16 March 1966; Liberal member Bill Heatley was appointed to fill the ensuing vacancy on 14 April until a special election at the November 1966 House of Representatives election, when he was elected to complete the term until 30 June 1968.)	Liberal	Queensland	1966, 1968	1966–1968
Bert Hendrickson	Labor	Victoria	1971	1947–1971
Denham Henty	Liberal	Tasmania	1968	1950–1968
Jim Keeffe	Labor	Queensland	1971	1965–1983
Pat Kennelly	Labor	Victoria	1971	1953–1971
Bert Lacey	Labor	Tasmania	1971	1965–1971
Condor Laucke	Liberal	South Australia	1968	1967–1981
Keith Laught	Liberal	South Australia	1971	1951–1969
Ellis Lawrie	Country	Queensland	1971	1965–1975
Elliot Lillico	Liberal	Tasmania	1971	1959–1974
John Marriott	Liberal	Tasmania	1971	1953–1975
Ted Mattner	Liberal	South Australia	1968	1944–1946, 1950–1968
Doug McClelland	Labor	New South Wales	1968	1962–1987
Colin McKellar	Country	New South Wales	1968	1958–1970
Nick McKenna	Labor	Tasmania	1968	1944–1968
Frank McManus	Democratic Labor	Victoria	1971	1956–1962, 1965–1974
Alister McMullin	Liberal	New South Wales	1971	1951–1971
Kenneth Morris	Liberal	Queensland	1968	1963–1968
Tony Mulvihill	Labor	New South Wales	1971	1965–1983
Lionel Murphy	Labor	New South Wales	1968	1962–1975
Theo Nicholls	Labor	South Australia	1968	1944–1968
Justin O'Byrne	Labor	Tasmania	1971	1947–1981
James Ormonde	Labor	New South Wales	1971	1958, 1959–1970
Shane Paltridge (Note: Liberal Senator Shane Paltridge died on 21 January 1966; Liberal member Reg Withers was appointed to fill the ensuing vacancy on 17 February but he was defeated for the seat at the November 1966 House of Representatives election by Labor candidate Laurie Wilkinson.)	Liberal	Western Australia	1968	1951–1966
Bob Poke	Labor	Tasmania	1968	1956–1974
George Poyser (Note: Labor Senator Charles Sandford died on 22 October 1966; Labor member George Poyser was appointed to fill the ensuing vacancy on 26 October until a special election at the November 1966 House of Representatives election, when he was elected to complete the term until 30 June 1968.)	Labor	Victoria	1966, 1968	1966–1975
Edgar Prowse	Country	Western Australia	1968	1962–1973
Dame Annabelle Rankin	Liberal	Queensland	1968	1947–1971
Clem Ridley	Labor	South Australia	1971	1959–1971
Charles Sandford	Labor	Victoria	1968	1947–1956, 1957–1966
Malcolm Scott	Liberal	Western Australia	1971	1950–1971
Bob Sherrington	Liberal	Queensland	1968	1962–1966
Peter Sim (Note: Liberal Party Senator Seddon Vincent died on 9 November 1964; Liberal Party member Peter Sim was appointed to fill the ensuing vacancy on 26 November until a special election at the November 1966 House of Representatives election, when he was elected to complete the term until 30 June 1968.)	Liberal	Western Australia	1966, 1968	1964–1981
Bill Spooner	Liberal	New South Wales	1968	1950–1965
Dame Dorothy Tangney	Labor	Western Australia	1971	1943–1968
Jim Toohey	Labor	South Australia	1971	1953–1971
Reg Turnbull	Independent	Tasmania	1968	1962–1974
James Webster (Note: Country Party Senator Harrie Wade died on 18 November 1964; Country Party member James Webster was appointed to fill the ensuing vacancy on 9 December until a special election at the November 1966 House of Representatives election, when he was elected to complete the term until 30 June 1968.)	Country	Victoria	1966, 1968	1964–1981
Dame Ivy Wedgwood	Liberal	Victoria	1971	1950–1971
John Wheeldon	Labor	Western Australia	1971	1964–1981
Laurie Wilkinson	Labor	Western Australia	1968	1966–1974
Don Willesee	Labor	Western Australia	1968	1950–1975
Reg Withers	Liberal	Western Australia	1966	1966, 1968–1987
Ian Wood	Liberal	Queensland	1971	1950–1978
Reg Wright	Liberal	Tasmania	1968	1950–1978
