= List of senators from Western Australia =

Western Australia Australian Senate
- Created: 1901
- Party: Labor (5); Liberal (4); Greens (1); Australia's Voice (1); One Nation (1)

This is a list of senators from the state of Western Australia since the Federation of Australia in 1901.

== List ==
Senate	Election	Senator (Party)	Senator (Party)	Senator (Party)	Senator (Party)	Senator (Party)	Senator (Party)	Senator (Party)	Senator (Party)	Senator (Party)	Senator (Party)	Senator (Party)	Senator (Party)
1901–1903	1901	Edward Harney (Free Trade)	George Pearce (Labor/ National Labor/ Nationalist/ UAP)	Staniforth Smith (Free Trade)	Hugh de Largie (Labor/ National Labor/ Nationalist)	Norman Ewing (Free Trade)	Sir Alexander Matheson (Free Trade)	6 senators per state 1901-1950					
1901–1903	1903	Edward Harney (Free Trade)	George Pearce (Labor/ National Labor/ Nationalist/ UAP)	Staniforth Smith (Free Trade)	Hugh de Largie (Labor/ National Labor/ Nationalist)	Henry Saunders (Free Trade)	Sir Alexander Matheson (Free Trade)	6 senators per state 1901-1950					
1904–1906	1903	George Henderson (Labor/ National Labor/ Nationalist)	George Pearce (Labor/ National Labor/ Nationalist/ UAP)	Staniforth Smith (Free Trade)	Hugh de Largie (Labor/ National Labor/ Nationalist)	John Croft (Labor)	Sir Alexander Matheson (Free Trade)	6 senators per state 1901-1950					
1907–1910	1906	George Henderson (Labor/ National Labor/ Nationalist)	George Pearce (Labor/ National Labor/ Nationalist/ UAP)	Patrick Lynch (Labor/ National Labor/ Nationalist/ UAP)	Hugh de Largie (Labor/ National Labor/ Nationalist)	John Croft (Labor)	Ted Needham (Labor)	6 senators per state 1901-1950					
1910–1913	1910	George Henderson (Labor/ National Labor/ Nationalist)	George Pearce (Labor/ National Labor/ Nationalist/ UAP)	Patrick Lynch (Labor/ National Labor/ Nationalist/ UAP)	Hugh de Largie (Labor/ National Labor/ Nationalist)	Richard Buzacott (Labor/ National Labor/ Nationalist)	Ted Needham (Labor)	6 senators per state 1901-1950					
1913–1914	1913	George Henderson (Labor/ National Labor/ Nationalist)	George Pearce (Labor/ National Labor/ Nationalist/ UAP)	Patrick Lynch (Labor/ National Labor/ Nationalist/ UAP)	Hugh de Largie (Labor/ National Labor/ Nationalist)	Richard Buzacott (Labor/ National Labor/ Nationalist)	Ted Needham (Labor)	6 senators per state 1901-1950					
1914–1917	1914	George Henderson (Labor/ National Labor/ Nationalist)	George Pearce (Labor/ National Labor/ Nationalist/ UAP)	Patrick Lynch (Labor/ National Labor/ Nationalist/ UAP)	Hugh de Largie (Labor/ National Labor/ Nationalist)	Richard Buzacott (Labor/ National Labor/ Nationalist)	Ted Needham (Labor)	6 senators per state 1901-1950					
1914–1917	1916	George Henderson (Labor/ National Labor/ Nationalist)	George Pearce (Labor/ National Labor/ Nationalist/ UAP)	Patrick Lynch (Labor/ National Labor/ Nationalist/ UAP)	Hugh de Largie (Labor/ National Labor/ Nationalist)	Richard Buzacott (Labor/ National Labor/ Nationalist)	Ted Needham (Labor)	6 senators per state 1901-1950					
1914–1917	1917	George Henderson (Labor/ National Labor/ Nationalist)	George Pearce (Labor/ National Labor/ Nationalist/ UAP)	Patrick Lynch (Labor/ National Labor/ Nationalist/ UAP)	Hugh de Largie (Labor/ National Labor/ Nationalist)	Richard Buzacott (Labor/ National Labor/ Nationalist)	Ted Needham (Labor)	6 senators per state 1901-1950					
1917–1920	1917	George Henderson (Labor/ National Labor/ Nationalist)	George Pearce (Labor/ National Labor/ Nationalist/ UAP)	Patrick Lynch (Labor/ National Labor/ Nationalist/ UAP)	Hugh de Largie (Labor/ National Labor/ Nationalist)	Richard Buzacott (Labor/ National Labor/ Nationalist)	Ted Needham (Labor)	6 senators per state 1901-1950					
1920–1923	1919	George Henderson (Labor/ National Labor/ Nationalist)	George Pearce (Labor/ National Labor/ Nationalist/ UAP)	Patrick Lynch (Labor/ National Labor/ Nationalist/ UAP)	Hugh de Largie (Labor/ National Labor/ Nationalist)	Richard Buzacott (Labor/ National Labor/ Nationalist)	Edmund Drake-Brockman (Nationalist)	6 senators per state 1901-1950					
1923–1926	1922	Charles Graham (Labor)	George Pearce (Labor/ National Labor/ Nationalist/ UAP)	Patrick Lynch (Labor/ National Labor/ Nationalist/ UAP)	Walter Kingsmill (Nationalist /UAP)	Ted Needham (Labor)	Edmund Drake-Brockman (Nationalist)	6 senators per state 1901-1950					
1926–1929	1925	Charles Graham (Labor)	George Pearce (Labor/ National Labor/ Nationalist/ UAP)	Patrick Lynch (Labor/ National Labor/ Nationalist/ UAP)	Walter Kingsmill (Nationalist /UAP)	Ted Needham (Labor)	William Carroll (Country)	6 senators per state 1901-1950					
1929–1932	1928	Bertie Johnston (Country)	George Pearce (Labor/ National Labor/ Nationalist/ UAP)	Patrick Lynch (Labor/ National Labor/ Nationalist/ UAP)	Walter Kingsmill (Nationalist /UAP)	Hal Colebatch (Nationalist/ UAP)	William Carroll (Country)	6 senators per state 1901-1950					
1929–1932	1931	Bertie Johnston (Country)	George Pearce (Labor/ National Labor/ Nationalist/ UAP)	Patrick Lynch (Labor/ National Labor/ Nationalist/ UAP)	Walter Kingsmill (Nationalist /UAP)	Hal Colebatch (Nationalist/ UAP)	William Carroll (Country)	6 senators per state 1901-1950					
1932–1935	1931	Bertie Johnston (Country)	George Pearce (Labor/ National Labor/ Nationalist/ UAP)	Patrick Lynch (Labor/ National Labor/ Nationalist/ UAP)	Walter Kingsmill (Nationalist /UAP)	Hal Colebatch (Nationalist/ UAP)	William Carroll (Country)	6 senators per state 1901-1950					
1932–1935	1933	Bertie Johnston (Country)	George Pearce (Labor/ National Labor/ Nationalist/ UAP)	Patrick Lynch (Labor/ National Labor/ Nationalist/ UAP)	Walter Kingsmill (Nationalist /UAP)	Herbert Collett (UAP/ Liberal)	William Carroll (Country)	6 senators per state 1901-1950					
1932–1935	1935	Bertie Johnston (Country)	George Pearce (Labor/ National Labor/ Nationalist/ UAP)	Patrick Lynch (Labor/ National Labor/ Nationalist/ UAP)	Allan MacDonald (UAP/ Liberal)	Herbert Collett (UAP/ Liberal)	William Carroll (Country)	6 senators per state 1901-1950					
1935–1938	1934	Bertie Johnston (Country)	George Pearce (Labor/ National Labor/ Nationalist/ UAP)	Patrick Lynch (Labor/ National Labor/ Nationalist/ UAP)	Allan MacDonald (UAP/ Liberal)	Herbert Collett (UAP/ Liberal)	William Carroll (Country)	6 senators per state 1901-1950					
1935–1938	1936	Bertie Johnston (Country)	George Pearce (Labor/ National Labor/ Nationalist/ UAP)	Patrick Lynch (Labor/ National Labor/ Nationalist/ UAP)	Allan MacDonald (UAP/ Liberal)	Herbert Collett (UAP/ Liberal)	Thomas Marwick (Country)	6 senators per state 1901-1950					
1935–1938	1937	Bertie Johnston (Country)	George Pearce (Labor/ National Labor/ Nationalist/ UAP)	Patrick Lynch (Labor/ National Labor/ Nationalist/ UAP)	Allan MacDonald (UAP/ Liberal)	Herbert Collett (UAP/ Liberal)	James Cunningham (Labor)	6 senators per state 1901-1950					
1938–1941	1937	Bertie Johnston (Country)	James Fraser (Labor)	Robert Clothier (Labor)	Allan MacDonald (UAP/ Liberal)	Herbert Collett (UAP/ Liberal)	James Cunningham (Labor)	6 senators per state 1901-1950					
1941–1944	1940	Bertie Johnston (Country)	James Fraser (Labor)	Robert Clothier (Labor)	Allan MacDonald (UAP/ Liberal)	Herbert Collett (UAP/ Liberal)	James Cunningham (Labor)	6 senators per state 1901-1950					
1941–1944	1942	Charles Latham (Country)	James Fraser (Labor)	Robert Clothier (Labor)	Allan MacDonald (UAP/ Liberal)	Herbert Collett (UAP/ Liberal)	James Cunningham (Labor)	6 senators per state 1901-1950					
1941–1944	1943	Dorothy Tangney (Labor)	James Fraser (Labor)	Robert Clothier (Labor)	Allan MacDonald (UAP/ Liberal)	Herbert Collett (UAP/ Liberal)	Richard Nash (Labor)	6 senators per state 1901-1950					
1944–1947	1943	Dorothy Tangney (Labor)	James Fraser (Labor)	Robert Clothier (Labor)	Allan MacDonald (UAP/ Liberal)	Herbert Collett (UAP/ Liberal)	Richard Nash (Labor)	6 senators per state 1901-1950					
1944–1947	1945	Dorothy Tangney (Labor)	James Fraser (Labor)	Robert Clothier (Labor)	Allan MacDonald (UAP/ Liberal)	Herbert Collett (UAP/ Liberal)	Richard Nash (Labor)	6 senators per state 1901-1950					
1947–1950	1946	Dorothy Tangney (Labor)	James Fraser (Labor)	Robert Clothier (Labor)	Joe Cooke (Labor)	John Harris (Labor)	Richard Nash (Labor)	6 senators per state 1901-1950					
1947–1950	1950	Dorothy Tangney (Labor)	James Fraser (Labor)	Robert Clothier (Labor)	Joe Cooke (Labor)	John Harris (Labor)	Richard Nash (Labor)	Don Willesee (Labor)	Agnes Robertson (Liberal/ Independent/ Country)	Edmund Piesse (Country)	Malcolm Scott (Liberal)	10 senators per state 1950-1984	
1950–1951	1949	Dorothy Tangney (Labor)	James Fraser (Labor)	Seddon Vincent (Liberal)	Joe Cooke (Labor)	John Harris (Labor)	Richard Nash (Labor)	Don Willesee (Labor)	Agnes Robertson (Liberal/ Independent/ Country)	Edmund Piesse (Country)	Malcolm Scott (Liberal)	10 senators per state 1950-1984	
1951–1953	1951	Dorothy Tangney (Labor)	James Fraser (Labor)	Seddon Vincent (Liberal)	Shane Paltridge (Liberal)	Harrie Seward (Country)	Richard Nash (Labor)	Don Willesee (Labor)	Agnes Robertson (Liberal/ Independent/ Country)	Edmund Piesse (Country)	Malcolm Scott (Liberal)	10 senators per state 1950-1984	
1951–1953	1952	Dorothy Tangney (Labor)	James Fraser (Labor)	Seddon Vincent (Liberal)	Shane Paltridge (Liberal)	Harrie Seward (Country)	Joe Cooke (Labor)	Don Willesee (Labor)	Agnes Robertson (Liberal/ Independent/ Country)	Bill Robinson (Country)	Malcolm Scott (Liberal)	10 senators per state 1950-1984	
1953–1956	1953	Dorothy Tangney (Labor)	James Fraser (Labor)	Seddon Vincent (Liberal)	Shane Paltridge (Liberal)	Harrie Seward (Country)	Joe Cooke (Labor)	Don Willesee (Labor)	Agnes Robertson (Liberal/ Independent/ Country)	John Harris (Labor)	Malcolm Scott (Liberal)	10 senators per state 1950-1984	
1953–1956	1955a	Dorothy Tangney (Labor)	James Fraser (Labor)	Seddon Vincent (Liberal)	Shane Paltridge (Liberal)	Harrie Seward (Country)	Joe Cooke (Labor)	Don Willesee (Labor)	Agnes Robertson (Liberal/ Independent/ Country)	John Harris (Labor)	Malcolm Scott (Liberal)	10 senators per state 1950-1984	
1953–1956	1955b	Dorothy Tangney (Labor)	James Fraser (Labor)	Seddon Vincent (Liberal)	Shane Paltridge (Liberal)	Harrie Seward (Country)	Joe Cooke (Labor)	Don Willesee (Labor)	Agnes Robertson (Liberal/ Independent/ Country)	John Harris (Labor)	Malcolm Scott (Liberal)	10 senators per state 1950-1984	
1956–1959	1955	Dorothy Tangney (Labor)	James Fraser (Labor)	Seddon Vincent (Liberal)	Shane Paltridge (Liberal)	Harrie Seward (Country)	Joe Cooke (Labor)	Don Willesee (Labor)	Agnes Robertson (Liberal/ Independent/ Country)	John Harris (Labor)	Malcolm Scott (Liberal)	10 senators per state 1950-1984	
1956–1959	Aug 1958	Dorothy Tangney (Labor)	James Fraser (Labor)	Seddon Vincent (Liberal)	Shane Paltridge (Liberal)	Tom Drake-Brockman (Country)	Joe Cooke (Labor)	Don Willesee (Labor)	Agnes Robertson (Liberal/ Independent/ Country)	John Harris (Labor)	Malcolm Scott (Liberal)	10 senators per state 1950-1984	
1956–1959	Nov 1958	Dorothy Tangney (Labor)	James Fraser (Labor)	Seddon Vincent (Liberal)	Shane Paltridge (Liberal)	George Branson (Liberal)	Joe Cooke (Labor)	Don Willesee (Labor)	Agnes Robertson (Liberal/ Independent/ Country)	John Harris (Labor)	Malcolm Scott (Liberal)	10 senators per state 1950-1984	
1959–1962	1958	Dorothy Tangney (Labor)	Harry Cant (Labor)	Seddon Vincent (Liberal)	Shane Paltridge (Liberal)	George Branson (Liberal)	Joe Cooke (Labor)	Don Willesee (Labor)	Agnes Robertson (Liberal/ Independent/ Country)	Tom Drake-Brockman (Country)	Malcolm Scott (Liberal)	10 senators per state 1950-1984	
1962–1965	1961	Dorothy Tangney (Labor)	Harry Cant (Labor)	Seddon Vincent (Liberal)	Shane Paltridge (Liberal)	George Branson (Liberal)	Joe Cooke (Labor)	Don Willesee (Labor)	Edgar Prowse (Country)	Tom Drake-Brockman (Country)	Malcolm Scott (Liberal)	10 senators per state 1950-1984	
1962–1965	1964	Dorothy Tangney (Labor)	Harry Cant (Labor)	Peter Sim (Liberal)	Shane Paltridge (Liberal)	George Branson (Liberal)	Joe Cooke (Labor)	Don Willesee (Labor)	Edgar Prowse (Country)	Tom Drake-Brockman (Country)	Malcolm Scott (Liberal)	10 senators per state 1950-1984	
1965–1968	1964	Dorothy Tangney (Labor)	Harry Cant (Labor)	Peter Sim (Liberal)	Shane Paltridge (Liberal)	George Branson (Liberal)	John Wheeldon (Labor)	Don Willesee (Labor)	Edgar Prowse (Country)	Tom Drake-Brockman (Country)	Malcolm Scott (Liberal)	10 senators per state 1950-1984	
1965–1968	Feb 1966	Dorothy Tangney (Labor)	Harry Cant (Labor)	Peter Sim (Liberal)	Reg Withers (Liberal)	George Branson (Liberal)	John Wheeldon (Labor)	Don Willesee (Labor)	Edgar Prowse (Country)	Tom Drake-Brockman (Country)	Malcolm Scott (Liberal)	10 senators per state 1950-1984	
1965–1968	Nov 1966	Dorothy Tangney (Labor)	Harry Cant (Labor)	Peter Sim (Liberal)	Laurie Wilkinson (Labor)	George Branson (Liberal)	John Wheeldon (Labor)	Don Willesee (Labor)	Edgar Prowse (Country)	Tom Drake-Brockman (Country)	Malcolm Scott (Liberal)	10 senators per state 1950-1984	
1968–1971	1967	Reg Withers (Liberal)	Harry Cant (Labor)	Peter Sim (Liberal)	Laurie Wilkinson (Labor)	George Branson (Liberal)	John Wheeldon (Labor)	Don Willesee (Labor)	Edgar Prowse (Country)	Tom Drake-Brockman (Country)	Malcolm Scott (Liberal)	10 senators per state 1950-1984	
1971–1974	1970	Reg Withers (Liberal)	Harry Cant (Labor)	Peter Sim (Liberal)	Laurie Wilkinson (Labor)	Syd Negus (Independent)	John Wheeldon (Labor)	Don Willesee (Labor)	Edgar Prowse (Country)	Tom Drake-Brockman (Country)	Peter Durack (Liberal)	10 senators per state 1950-1984	
1971–1974	1974	Reg Withers (Liberal)	Harry Cant (Labor)	Peter Sim (Liberal)	Laurie Wilkinson (Labor)	Syd Negus (Independent)	John Wheeldon (Labor)	Don Willesee (Labor)	David Reid (Country)	Tom Drake-Brockman (Country)	Peter Durack (Liberal)	10 senators per state 1950-1984	
1974–1975	1974	Reg Withers (Liberal)	Gordon McIntosh (Labor)	Peter Sim (Liberal)	Peter Walsh (Labor)	Fred Chaney (Liberal)	John Wheeldon (Labor)	Don Willesee (Labor)	Ruth Coleman (Labor)	Tom Drake-Brockman (Country)	Peter Durack (Liberal)	10 senators per state 1950-1984	
1975–1978	1975	Reg Withers (Liberal)	Gordon McIntosh (Labor)	Peter Sim (Liberal)	Peter Walsh (Labor)	Fred Chaney (Liberal)	John Wheeldon (Labor)	Andrew Thomas (Liberal)	Ruth Coleman (Labor)	Tom Drake-Brockman (Country)	Peter Durack (Liberal)	10 senators per state 1950-1984	
1978–1981	1977	Reg Withers (Liberal)	Gordon McIntosh (Labor)	Peter Sim (Liberal)	Peter Walsh (Labor)	Fred Chaney (Liberal)	John Wheeldon (Labor)	Andrew Thomas (Liberal)	Ruth Coleman (Labor)	Allan Rocher (Liberal)	Peter Durack (Liberal)	10 senators per state 1950-1984	
1978–1981	1981	Reg Withers (Liberal)	Gordon McIntosh (Labor)	Peter Sim (Liberal)	Peter Walsh (Labor)	Fred Chaney (Liberal)	John Wheeldon (Labor)	Andrew Thomas (Liberal)	Ruth Coleman (Labor)	John Martyr (Liberal)	Peter Durack (Liberal)	10 senators per state 1950-1984	
1981–1983	1980	Reg Withers (Liberal)	Gordon McIntosh (Labor)	Noel Crichton-Browne (Liberal)	Peter Walsh (Labor)	Fred Chaney (Liberal)	Patricia Giles (Labor)	Andrew Thomas (Liberal)	Ruth Coleman (Labor)	John Martyr (Liberal)	Peter Durack (Liberal)	10 senators per state 1950-1984	
1983–1985	1983	Reg Withers (Liberal)	Gordon McIntosh (Labor)	Noel Crichton-Browne (Liberal)	Peter Walsh (Labor)	Fred Chaney (Liberal)	Patricia Giles (Labor)	Peter Cook (Labor)	Ruth Coleman (Labor)	Jack Evans (Democrat)	Peter Durack (Liberal)	10 senators per state 1950-1984	
1983–1985	1984	Reg Withers (Liberal)	Gordon McIntosh (Labor)	Noel Crichton-Browne (Liberal)	Peter Walsh (Labor)	Fred Chaney (Liberal)	Patricia Giles (Labor)	Peter Cook (Labor)	Ruth Coleman (Labor)	Jack Evans (Democrat)	Peter Durack (Liberal)	Jim McKiernan (Labor)	Sue Knowles (Liberal)
1985–1987	1984	Reg Withers (Liberal)	Gordon McIntosh (Labor)	Noel Crichton-Browne (Liberal)	Peter Walsh (Labor)	Fred Chaney (Liberal)	Patricia Giles (Labor)	Peter Cook (Labor)	Ruth Coleman (Labor)	Jo Vallentine (NDP/ Independent /Green)	Peter Durack (Liberal)	Jim McKiernan (Labor)	Sue Knowles (Liberal)
1985–1987	1985	Reg Withers (Liberal)	Gordon McIntosh (Labor)	Noel Crichton-Browne (Liberal)	Peter Walsh (Labor)	Fred Chaney (Liberal)	Patricia Giles (Labor)	Peter Cook (Labor)	Ruth Coleman (Labor)	Jo Vallentine (NDP/ Independent /Green)	Peter Durack (Liberal)	Jim McKiernan (Labor)	Sue Knowles (Liberal)
1987–1990	1987	John Panizza (Liberal)	Jean Jenkins (Democrat)	Noel Crichton-Browne (Liberal)	Peter Walsh (Labor)	Fred Chaney (Liberal)	Patricia Giles (Labor)	Peter Cook (Labor)	Michael Beahan (Labor)	Jo Vallentine (NDP/ Independent /Green)	Peter Durack (Liberal)	Jim McKiernan (Labor)	Sue Knowles (Liberal)
1987–1990	1990	John Panizza (Liberal)	Jean Jenkins (Democrat)	Noel Crichton-Browne (Liberal)	Peter Walsh (Labor)	Ian Campbell (Liberal)	Patricia Giles (Labor)	Peter Cook (Labor)	Michael Beahan (Labor)	Jo Vallentine (NDP/ Independent /Green)	Peter Durack (Liberal)	Jim McKiernan (Labor)	Sue Knowles (Liberal)
1990–1993	1990	John Panizza (Liberal)	Winston Crane (Liberal)	Noel Crichton-Browne (Liberal)	Peter Walsh (Labor)	Ian Campbell (Liberal)	Patricia Giles (Labor)	Peter Cook (Labor)	Michael Beahan (Labor)	Jo Vallentine (NDP/ Independent /Green)	Peter Durack (Liberal)	Jim McKiernan (Labor)	Sue Knowles (Liberal)
1990–1993	1992	John Panizza (Liberal)	Winston Crane (Liberal)	Noel Crichton-Browne (Liberal)	Peter Walsh (Labor)	Ian Campbell (Liberal)	Patricia Giles (Labor)	Peter Cook (Labor)	Michael Beahan (Labor)	Christabel Chamarette (Greens)	Peter Durack (Liberal)	Jim McKiernan (Labor)	Sue Knowles (Liberal)
1993–1996	1993	John Panizza (Liberal)	Winston Crane (Liberal)	Noel Crichton-Browne (Liberal)	Dee Margetts (Greens)	Ian Campbell (Liberal)	Chris Evans (Labor)	Peter Cook (Labor)	Michael Beahan (Labor)	Christabel Chamarette (Greens)	Chris Ellison (Liberal)	Jim McKiernan (Labor)	Sue Knowles (Liberal)
1996–1999	1996	John Panizza (Liberal)	Winston Crane (Liberal)	Alan Eggleston (Liberal)	Dee Margetts (Greens)	Ian Campbell (Liberal)	Chris Evans (Labor)	Peter Cook (Labor)	Mark Bishop (Labor)	Andrew Murray (Democrat)	Chris Ellison (Liberal)	Jim McKiernan (Labor)	Sue Knowles (Liberal)
1996–1999	1997	Ross Lightfoot (Liberal)	Winston Crane (Liberal)	Alan Eggleston (Liberal)	Dee Margetts (Greens)	Ian Campbell (Liberal)	Chris Evans (Labor)	Peter Cook (Labor)	Mark Bishop (Labor)	Andrew Murray (Democrat)	Chris Ellison (Liberal)	Jim McKiernan (Labor)	Sue Knowles (Liberal)
1999–2002	1998	Ross Lightfoot (Liberal)	Winston Crane (Liberal)	Alan Eggleston (Liberal)	Brian Greig (Democrat)	Ian Campbell (Liberal)	Chris Evans (Labor)	Peter Cook (Labor)	Mark Bishop (Labor)	Andrew Murray (Democrat)	Chris Ellison (Liberal)	Jim McKiernan (Labor)	Sue Knowles (Liberal)
2002–2005	2001	Ross Lightfoot (Liberal)	David Johnston (Liberal)	Alan Eggleston (Liberal)	Brian Greig (Democrat)	Ian Campbell (Liberal)	Chris Evans (Labor)	Peter Cook (Labor)	Mark Bishop (Labor)	Andrew Murray (Democrat)	Chris Ellison (Liberal)	Ruth Webber (Labor)	Sue Knowles (Liberal)
2005–2008	2004	Ross Lightfoot (Liberal)	David Johnston (Liberal)	Alan Eggleston (Liberal)	Rachel Siewert (Greens)	Ian Campbell (Liberal)	Chris Evans (Labor)	Glenn Sterle (Labor)	Mark Bishop (Labor)	Andrew Murray (Democrat)	Chris Ellison (Liberal)	Ruth Webber (Labor)	Judith Adams (Liberal)
2005–2008	2007	Ross Lightfoot (Liberal)	David Johnston (Liberal)	Alan Eggleston (Liberal)	Rachel Siewert (Greens)	Mathias Cormann (Liberal)	Chris Evans (Labor)	Glenn Sterle (Labor)	Mark Bishop (Labor)	Andrew Murray (Democrat)	Chris Ellison (Liberal)	Ruth Webber (Labor)	Judith Adams (Liberal)
2008–2011	2007	Michaelia Cash (Liberal)	David Johnston (Liberal)	Alan Eggleston (Liberal)	Rachel Siewert (Greens)	Mathias Cormann (Liberal)	Chris Evans (Labor)	Glenn Sterle (Labor)	Mark Bishop (Labor)	Scott Ludlam (Greens)	Chris Ellison (Liberal)	Louise Pratt (Labor)	Judith Adams (Liberal)
2008–2011	2009	Michaelia Cash (Liberal)	David Johnston (Liberal)	Alan Eggleston (Liberal)	Rachel Siewert (Greens)	Mathias Cormann (Liberal)	Chris Evans (Labor)	Glenn Sterle (Labor)	Mark Bishop (Labor)	Scott Ludlam (Greens)	Chris Back (Liberal)	Louise Pratt (Labor)	Judith Adams (Liberal)
2011–2014	2010	Michaelia Cash (Liberal)	David Johnston (Liberal)	Alan Eggleston (Liberal)	Rachel Siewert (Greens)	Mathias Cormann (Liberal)	Chris Evans (Labor)	Glenn Sterle (Labor)	Mark Bishop (Labor)	Scott Ludlam (Greens)	Chris Back (Liberal)	Louise Pratt (Labor)	Judith Adams (Liberal)
2011–2014	2012	Michaelia Cash (Liberal)	David Johnston (Liberal)	Alan Eggleston (Liberal)	Rachel Siewert (Greens)	Mathias Cormann (Liberal)	Chris Evans (Labor)	Glenn Sterle (Labor)	Mark Bishop (Labor)	Scott Ludlam (Greens)	Chris Back (Liberal)	Louise Pratt (Labor)	Dean Smith (Liberal)
2011–2014	2013	Michaelia Cash (Liberal)	David Johnston (Liberal)	Alan Eggleston (Liberal)	Rachel Siewert (Greens)	Mathias Cormann (Liberal)	Sue Lines (Labor)	Glenn Sterle (Labor)	Mark Bishop (Labor)	Scott Ludlam (Greens)	Chris Back (Liberal)	Louise Pratt (Labor)	Dean Smith (Liberal)
2014–2016	2014	Michaelia Cash (Liberal)	David Johnston (Liberal)	Linda Reynolds (Liberal)	Rachel Siewert (Greens)	Mathias Cormann (Liberal)	Sue Lines (Labor)	Glenn Sterle (Labor)	Joe Bullock (Labor)	Scott Ludlam (Greens)	Chris Back (Liberal)	Dio Wang (Palmer United)	Dean Smith (Liberal)
2014–2016	2016	Michaelia Cash (Liberal)	David Johnston (Liberal)	Linda Reynolds (Liberal)	Rachel Siewert (Greens)	Mathias Cormann (Liberal)	Sue Lines (Labor)	Glenn Sterle (Labor)	Pat Dodson (Labor)	Scott Ludlam (Greens)	Chris Back (Liberal)	Dio Wang (Palmer United)	Dean Smith (Liberal)
2016–2019	2016	Michaelia Cash (Liberal)	Rod Culleton (One Nation/ Independent)	Linda Reynolds (Liberal)	Rachel Siewert (Greens)	Mathias Cormann (Liberal)	Sue Lines (Labor)	Glenn Sterle (Labor)	Pat Dodson (Labor)	Scott Ludlam (Greens)	Chris Back (Liberal)	Louise Pratt (Labor)	Dean Smith (Liberal)
2016–2019	2016	Michaelia Cash (Liberal)	Rod Culleton (One Nation/ Independent)	Linda Reynolds (Liberal)	Rachel Siewert (Greens)	Mathias Cormann (Liberal)	Sue Lines (Labor)	Glenn Sterle (Labor)	Pat Dodson (Labor)	Scott Ludlam (Greens)	Chris Back (Liberal)	Louise Pratt (Labor)	Dean Smith (Liberal)
2016–2019	2017	Michaelia Cash (Liberal)	Peter Georgiou (One Nation)	Linda Reynolds (Liberal)	Rachel Siewert (Greens)	Mathias Cormann (Liberal)	Sue Lines (Labor)	Glenn Sterle (Labor)	Pat Dodson (Labor)	Jordon Steele-John (Greens)	Slade Brockman (Liberal)	Louise Pratt (Labor)	Dean Smith (Liberal)
2019–2022	2019	Michaelia Cash (Liberal)	Matt O'Sullivan (Liberal)	Linda Reynolds (Liberal)	Rachel Siewert (Greens)	Mathias Cormann (Liberal)	Sue Lines (Labor)	Glenn Sterle (Labor)	Pat Dodson (Labor)	Jordon Steele-John (Greens)	Slade Brockman (Liberal)	Louise Pratt (Labor)	Dean Smith (Liberal)
2019–2022	2020	Michaelia Cash (Liberal)	Matt O'Sullivan (Liberal)	Linda Reynolds (Liberal)	Rachel Siewert (Greens)	Ben Small (Liberal)	Sue Lines (Labor)	Glenn Sterle (Labor)	Pat Dodson (Labor)	Jordon Steele-John (Greens)	Slade Brockman (Liberal)	Louise Pratt (Labor)	Dean Smith (Liberal)
2019–2022	2021	Michaelia Cash (Liberal)	Matt O'Sullivan (Liberal)	Linda Reynolds (Liberal)	Dorinda Cox (Greens/ Labor)	Ben Small (Liberal)	Sue Lines (Labor)	Glenn Sterle (Labor)	Pat Dodson (Labor)	Jordon Steele-John (Greens)	Slade Brockman (Liberal)	Louise Pratt (Labor)	Dean Smith (Liberal)
2019–2022	April 2022	Michaelia Cash (Liberal)	Matt O'Sullivan (Liberal)	Linda Reynolds (Liberal)	Dorinda Cox (Greens/ Labor)	Vacant	Sue Lines (Labor)	Glenn Sterle (Labor)	Pat Dodson (Labor)	Jordon Steele-John (Greens)	Slade Brockman (Liberal)	Louise Pratt (Labor)	Dean Smith (Liberal)
2019–2022	May 2022	Michaelia Cash (Liberal)	Matt O'Sullivan (Liberal)	Linda Reynolds (Liberal)	Dorinda Cox (Greens/ Labor)	Ben Small (Liberal)	Sue Lines (Labor)	Glenn Sterle (Labor)	Pat Dodson (Labor)	Jordon Steele-John (Greens)	Slade Brockman (Liberal)	Louise Pratt (Labor)	Dean Smith (Liberal)
2022–2025	2022	Michaelia Cash (Liberal)	Matt O'Sullivan (Liberal)	Linda Reynolds (Liberal)	Dorinda Cox (Greens/ Labor)	Fatima Payman (Labor/ Independent/ Australia's Voice)	Sue Lines (Labor)	Glenn Sterle (Labor)	Pat Dodson (Labor)	Jordon Steele-John (Greens)	Slade Brockman (Liberal)	Louise Pratt (Labor)	Dean Smith (Liberal)
2022–2025	2024a	Michaelia Cash (Liberal)	Matt O'Sullivan (Liberal)	Linda Reynolds (Liberal)	Dorinda Cox (Greens/ Labor)	Fatima Payman (Labor/ Independent/ Australia's Voice)	Sue Lines (Labor)	Glenn Sterle (Labor)	Varun Ghosh (Labor)	Jordon Steele-John (Greens)	Slade Brockman (Liberal)	Louise Pratt (Labor)	Dean Smith (Liberal)
2022–2025	2024b	Michaelia Cash (Liberal)	Matt O'Sullivan (Liberal)	Linda Reynolds (Liberal)	Dorinda Cox (Greens/ Labor)	Fatima Payman (Labor/ Independent/ Australia's Voice)	Sue Lines (Labor)	Glenn Sterle (Labor)	Varun Ghosh (Labor)	Jordon Steele-John (Greens)	Slade Brockman (Liberal)	Louise Pratt (Labor)	Dean Smith (Liberal)
2022–2025	2025	Michaelia Cash (Liberal)	Matt O'Sullivan (Liberal)	Linda Reynolds (Liberal)	Dorinda Cox (Greens/ Labor)	Fatima Payman (Labor/ Independent/ Australia's Voice)	Sue Lines (Labor)	Glenn Sterle (Labor)	Varun Ghosh (Labor)	Jordon Steele-John (Greens)	Slade Brockman (Liberal)	Louise Pratt (Labor)	Dean Smith (Liberal)
2025–2028	2025	Michaelia Cash (Liberal)	Matt O'Sullivan (Liberal)	Tyron Whitten (One Nation)	Dorinda Cox (Greens/ Labor)	Fatima Payman (Labor/ Independent/ Australia's Voice)	Sue Lines (Labor)	Glenn Sterle (Labor)	Varun Ghosh (Labor)	Jordon Steele-John (Greens)	Slade Brockman (Liberal)	Ellie Whiteaker (Labor)	Dean Smith (Liberal)

== See also ==
- Electoral results for the Australian Senate in Western Australia
