= Laurie Wilkinson =

Australian politician

Senator for Western Australia
- In office 26 November 1966 – 11 April 1974
- Preceded by: Reg Withers

Personal details
- Born: 12 November 1903 Fremantle, Western Australia
- Died: 9 November 1991 (aged 87) Canberra, Australian Capital Territory
- Party: Australian Labor Party
- Education: University of Adelaide
- Occupation: Electrical engineer

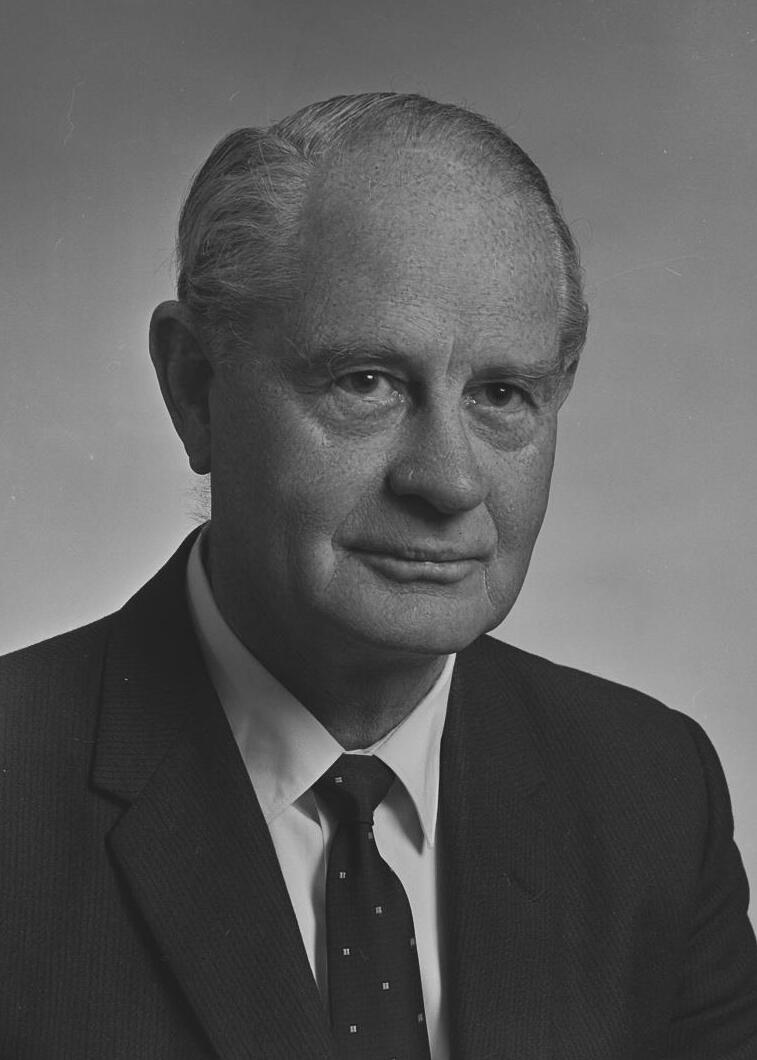
Wilkinson in 1971

Lawrence Degenhardt Wilkinson (12 November 1903 – 9 November 1991) was an Australian politician. Born in Fremantle, Western Australia, he was educated at Perth Modern School, then the South Australian School of Mines and finally the University of Adelaide before becoming an electrical engineer. He was also a dairy farmer and telecommunications engineer. In 1966, he won the second of two seats at the special election for the Australian Senate to fill the vacancies caused by the deaths of Liberal Senators Sir Shane Paltridge and Seddon Vincent. Peter Sim and Reg Withers had been appointed to the vacancies, however the Australian Constitution had not been changed since the introduction of proportional representation in 1949 and dictated that an appointment to a casual vacancy was required to be re-contested at the next election. Even though both vacancies were due to the death of Liberal Senators, Labor, with 41.80% of the vote, was able to pick up the second seat, at the expense of Withers. Wilkinson was re-elected in 1967 and held the seat until his retirement in 1974.

Wilkinson died in 1991, aged 87.
