= Peter Mason (physicist) =

English-born Australian physicist

Peter Mason (25 February 1922 – 27 March 1987) was an English-born Australian physicist, educator and science communicator.

He was born at St Pancras in London to chemist Alfred George Mason and Winnie, née Wheeldon. He attended Eriva Deene School, St Clement's Mixed School and Bournemouth School before attending the University of London (Bachelor of Science 1943, Master of Science 1946), winning first-class honours in mathematics and physics. From 1943 to 1946 he was employed at the Ministry of Supply studying the military applications of quartz crystals, and in 1945 he became an associate member of the Institute of Physics. He married Sheila Mabelle Clegg at Bournemouth on 7 June 1945. they had three children: Deirdre, Chloe and Paul who were all born in England and who all moved to Sydney, Australia.

Mason was a committed pacifist, which went well with his wife's Quaker faith, although he did not become a Quaker himself. Mason and his wife were early supporters of the Campaign for Nuclear Disarmament.

From 1946 to 1953 Mason worked with the Department of Scientific and Industrial Research and from 1953 to 1961 with the British Rubber Producers' Research Association. He received his PhD in 1960 with a thesis on the visco-elasticity of strained rubber, and in 1962 moved to Australia to study keratin on a post-doctoral fellowship with the Division of Textile Physics of the Commonwealth Scientific and Industrial Research Organisation (CSIRO) in Sydney, becoming principal research officer. He studied keratin, the fibrous protein in wool.

Mason was appointed foundation professor of physics at Macquarie University in 1966 and gave the university's first undergraduate lecture in 1967. In the late 1970s he designed and taught a postgraduate course in biophysics, one of his research areas. He served two terms on the university council (1974–1977, 1980–1986). He was also involved in politics, opposing the Vietnam War and standing as a Senate candidate for the Australian Reform Movement in 1967. In the 1970s, during the public debates about energy policy and whether Australia should export uranium he was invited to contribute to these debates.

In 1986, Mason was elected a fellow of the Australian and New Zealand Association for the Advancement of Science, and from 1966 to 1986 he was on the council of the Australian Institute of Nuclear Science and Engineering.

He served on the founding council of Griffith University from 1971 to 1977 and as a councillor of the Public Library of New South Wales from 1971 to 1975. From 1983 to 1986 he convened the advisory council of the Australian Broadcasting Corporation (ABC), and he remained active in pacifist causes, notably Scientists Against Nuclear Arms and Pugwash.

Radio programs, as Robyn Williams host of the Science Show explained, came late in Mason's career for the ABC in the 1970s, presenting a series of Science Show programs from 1978 to 1985. Williams welcomed Mason's "early contributions as a broadcaster but never foresaw either is extraordinary drive to improve his style, nor the response that would come from listeners". Books followed the programs.

"Blood and Iron" won him, together with Robyn Williams and Halina Szewczyk a United Nations Media Peace Prize gold citation.

He published a book on probability, Half Your Luck, in 1986, illustrated by Bruce Petty. He published seventy scientific papers during his career.

Very late in his career, Mason (and Williams) were both Commissioners in the federal government's Commission for the Future (1985-1998), an independent agency reporting to the Minister for Science. Its scope was broad; a major aim was 'to democratize scientific and technological decision making and involve people who are often excluded from decision making.'. In the Commission's journal In Future, Williams wrote of Mason's contributions curtailed by his worsening ability to speak.

Mason was diagnosed with a terminal brain tumour in 1985 about which he was interviewed by Williams for the ABC's Science Show. Mason retired an emeritus professor from Macquarie University in 1986. He died at Wahroonga on 20 March 1987 and was survived by his wife and three children. Macquarie University still runs the general science courses he designed and awards the Peter Mason Prize for outstanding achievement in them annually.

== Publications ==
Mason, Peter (1965). "Some recent developments in polymer physics" Proceedings of the Royal Australian Chemical Institute, Vol. 32, No. 7, July 1965.
