= George Poyser (politician) =

Australian politician (1915–1986)

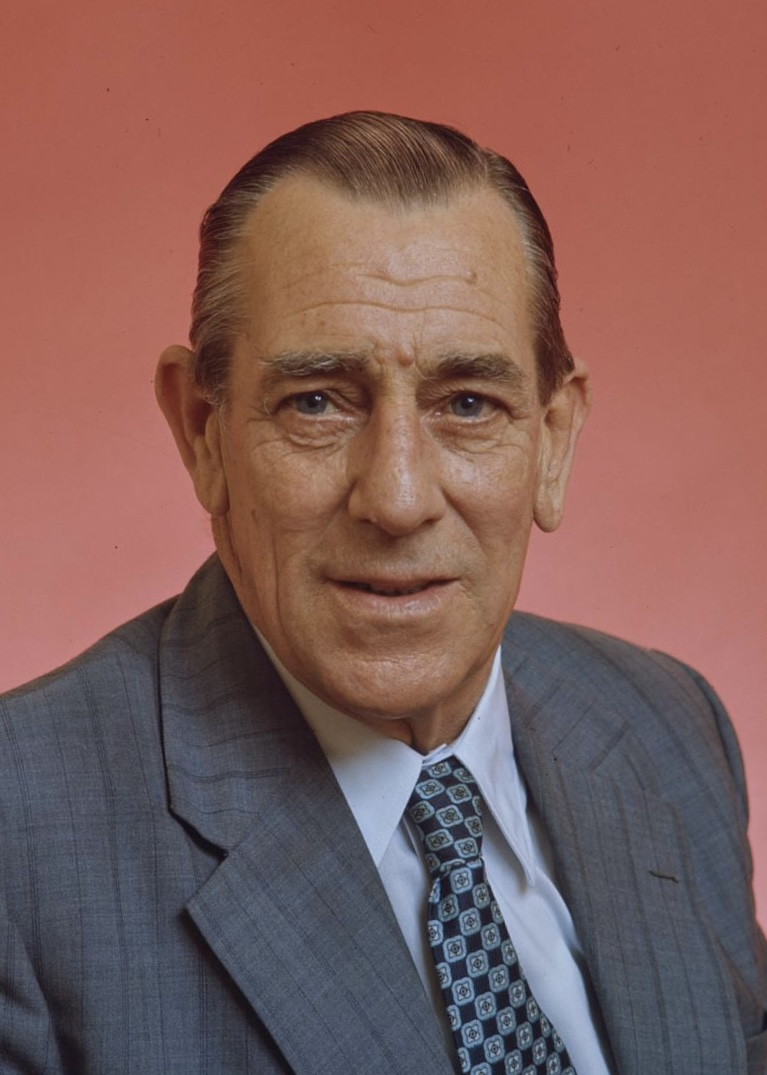
- Poyser in 1974

Senator for Victoria
- In office 26 October 1966 – 11 November 1975
- Preceded by: Charles Sandford

Personal details
- Born: Arthur George Poyser; 13 February 1915 Ballarat, Victoria, Australia
- Died: 5 August 1986 (aged 71) Geelong, Victoria, Australia
- Party: Labor
- Spouse: Dorothy Irene Grinter (m. 1940)
- Occupation: Tram conductor

Arthur George Poyser (13 February 1915 – 5 August 1986) was an Australian politician. He was a member of the Australian Labor Party (ALP) and served as a senator for Victoria from 1966 to 1975. He was a World War II veteran and tram conductor before entering politics.

== Early life ==
Poyser was born on 13 February 1915 in Ballarat, Victoria. He was the son of Mary Jane (née Andrew) and Arthur George Poyser. His father was a carpenter.

Poyser was educated at the Ashby State School in Geelong West. After leaving school he began working in the textile industry. He enlisted in the Australian Imperial Force in April 1940 and served in the Middle East with the 2/5th Battalion. He was wounded in the right hand, causing the amputation of a finger, and returned to Australia in March 1941. He received a medical discharge in June 1941 and returned to his former occupation.

In 1946, Poyser began working as a conductor on the Geelong tramway network. He was active in the Tramways Union and became secretary of its Geelong branch. He continued to work on the tramways until 1955, when he was appointed secretary of the Geelong Trades Hall Council. He served in that role until 1961 and was also a member of the Miscellaneous Workers Union.

== Politics ==
Poyser acted as campaign secretary for Labor candidate John Dedman in the seat of Corio at the 1954 federal election. He stood unsuccessfully for the Victorian Legislative Assembly at the 1955 and 1958 Victorian state elections, on each occasion losing to the Liberal candidate Thomas Maltby in the seat of Geelong. He was an assistant state secretary and paid country organiser for the ALP from 1961 to 1967.

On 26 October 1966, Poyser was elected to the Senate by the parliament of Victoria to fill a casual vacancy caused by the death of Charles Sandford. He was described by The Canberra Times as "senator for a day", as parliament adjourned for the 1966 election on the same day that he was sworn in to office. Poyser was re-elected to fill the remainder of Sandford's term at the 1966 election and was re-elected to six-year terms in his own right at the 1967 and 1974 elections. Both his second and third terms were cut short by double dissolutions and he did not nominate for re-election at the 1975 election.

== Personal life ==
In 1940, Poyser married Dorothy Grinter, with whom he had four children. He died at his home in Geelong on 5 August 1986, aged 71.
