= Reg Withers =

Australian politician (1924–2014)

The Right Honourable Reg Withers
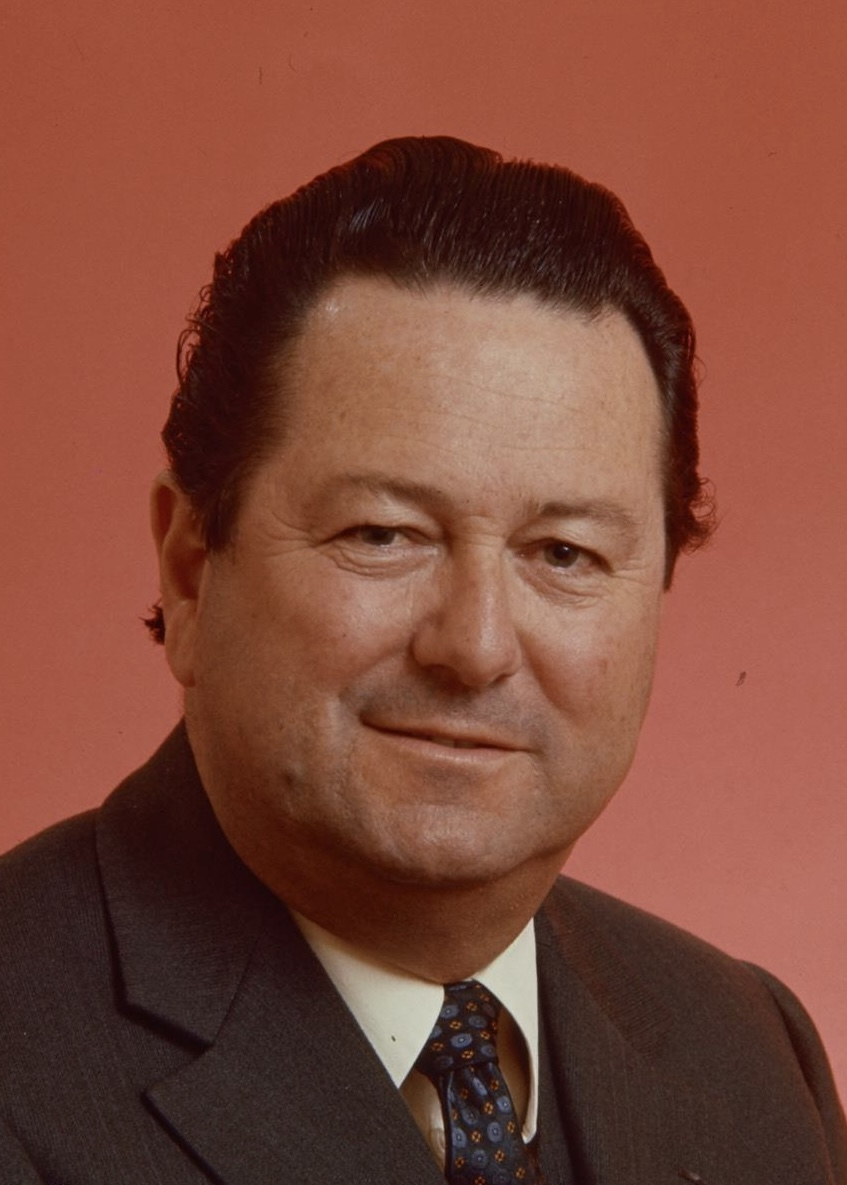

Minister for Administrative Services
- In office 22 December 1975 – 7 August 1978
- Prime Minister: Malcolm Fraser
- Preceded by: Gordon Bryant
- Succeeded by: Eric Robinson

Special Minister of State Minister for the Capital Territory
- In office 11 November 1975 – 22 December 1975
- Prime Minister: Malcolm Fraser
- Preceded by: Gordon Bryant
- Succeeded by: Eric Robinson

Leader of the Government in the Senate
- In office 11 November 1975 – 7 August 1978
- Preceded by: Ken Wriedt
- Succeeded by: John Carrick

Leader of the Opposition in the Senate
- In office 20 December 1972 – 11 November 1975
- Preceded by: Lionel Murphy
- Succeeded by: Ken Wriedt

Senator for Western Australia
- In office 1 July 1968 – 6 June 1987
- Succeeded by: John Panizza
- In office 17 February 1966 – 25 November 1966
- Preceded by: Sir Shane Paltridge
- Succeeded by: Laurie Wilkinson

Lord Mayor of Perth
- In office 1991–1994
- Preceded by: Chas Hopkins
- Succeeded by: Peter Nattrass

Personal details
- Born: Reginald Greive Withers; 26 October 1924 Bunbury, Western Australia
- Died: 15 November 2014 (aged 90) Perth, Western Australia
- Party: Liberal
- Spouse: Shirley Jones (m. 1953)
- Education: University of Western Australia
- Profession: Solicitor, barrister
- Nickname: The Toecutter

Military service
- Allegiance: Australia
- Branch/service: Royal Australian Navy
- Years of service: 1942–1946
- Unit: HMAS Gawler

Reginald Greive Withers (26 October 1924 – 15 November 2014) was an Australian politician and lawyer. He was a member of the Liberal Party and served as a Senator for Western Australia for nearly 20 years. He was a cabinet minister in the Fraser government and later served as Lord Mayor of Perth.

Withers was born in Bunbury, Western Australia, the son of state Labor MP Frederick Withers. He served in the Royal Australian Navy during World War II and completed a law degree at the University of Western Australia upon his return. He subsequently moved back to Bunbury where he served on the Bunbury Municipal Council. Withers joined the Liberal Party at a young age and served as state president from 1961 to 1965. He was appointed to a Senate casual vacancy in 1966. He was defeated at the 1966 federal election, but was re-elected at the 1967 half-Senate election.

Withers was chosen as Leader of the Opposition in the Senate following the Coalition's defeat at the 1972 election. He played a key role in the 1975 constitutional crisis as the Senate sought to block supply to the Whitlam government, culminating in the dismissal of Prime Minister Gough Whitlam. Withers subsequently became Leader of the Government in the Senate and was appointed Minister for Administrative Services and Vice-President of the Executive Council in the Fraser government. He was sacked in controversial circumstances in 1978 but remained in parliament until 1987. He later served as Lord Mayor of Perth from 1991 to 1994.

== Early life ==
Withers was born on 26 October 1924 in Bunbury, Western Australia. He was the sixth of seven children born to Isabelle Louisa (née Grieve) and Frederick James Withers. His father was a former locomotive driver who had been elected to the Western Australian Legislative Assembly earlier in 1924 and served for over 20 years as a Labor MP.

Withers was educated at Bunbury Senior High School. He enlisted in the Royal Australian Navy in June 1942, aged 17, where he received training as a coder. He was subsequently attached to HMAS Gawler, serving in the Mediterranean, Indian Ocean and Pacific. He was discharged from the military in April 1946.

Withers settled in Perth after the war's end, completing his leaving certificate at Perth Technical College and going on to study law at the University of Western Australia on a scholarship for ex-servicemen. He graduated Bachelor of Laws in 1952 and undertook his articles of clerkship with Howard Solomon. After being admitted to the bar in 1953 he returned to Bunbury where he practised as a solicitor.

== Political career ==
Returning to Bunbury to practise law, first as a solicitor and, from 1953, a barrister, Withers was elected to Bunbury Municipal Council and began to involve himself in Liberal Party affairs, serving at various times as Liberal Party state president and vice-president and federal vice-president.

Withers entered the Senate on 17 February 1966 to fill the vacancy caused by the death of Senator Sir Shane Paltridge, but lost his seat at the special Senate election later that year, before being re-elected in 1967, returning to the Senate in 1968.

Described as having a "jovial manner and perpetual grin", Withers quickly gained a reputation as the Liberal numbers man and served as Senate Government Whip from 1969–71. After the defeat of the McMahon government in 1972, Withers became Opposition Leader in the Senate, where he retained a thin majority and acted to block much of the Whitlam Government's legislation. Withers was widely known as "The Toecutter" for his alleged approach to enforcing party loyalty and his role in the 1975 Australian constitutional crisis.

=== Fraser government ===
After the dismissal of the Whitlam government on 11 November 1975, Withers was appointed to Malcolm Fraser's first (caretaker) ministry, becoming Vice-President of the Executive Council as well as briefly holding the portfolios of Special Minister of State, Capital Territory, Media, and Tourism and Recreation during the period leading up to the December election. After the election, Withers became Minister for Administrative Services, and continued as Vice-President of the Executive Council until 7 August 1978. He was dismissed by Fraser in the wake of the findings of a royal commission into aspects of a redistribution of certain federal electorates in Queensland. The royal commission found that Withers had exercised his ministerial influence in an inappropriate way. At the time he commented about Fraser that "When the man who's carried the biggest knife in this country for the last ten years starts giving you a lecture about propriety, integrity and the need to resign, then he's either making a sick joke or playing you for a mug."

=== Later career ===
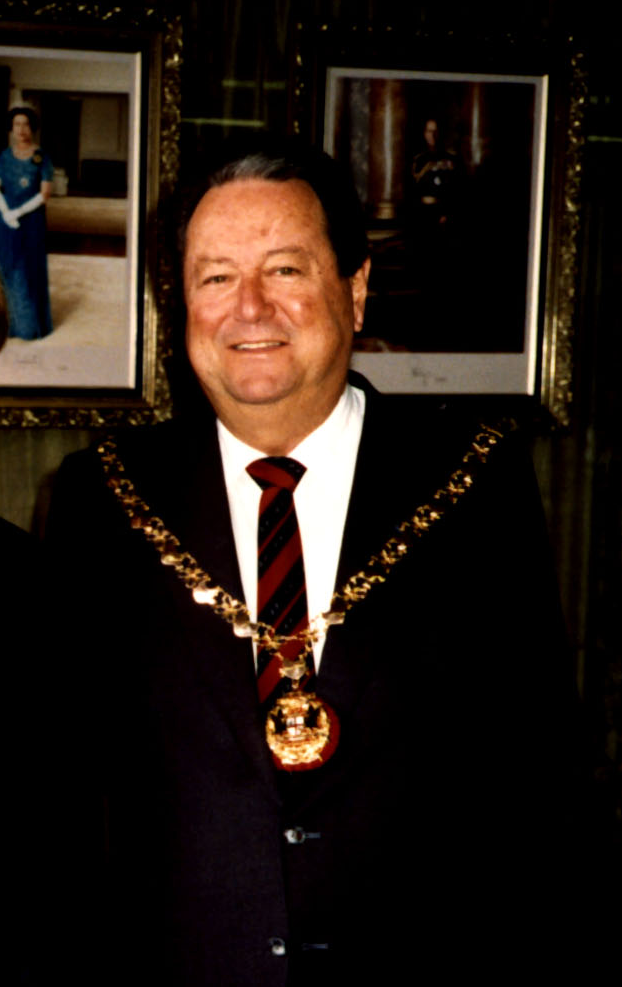
Withers in 1991 as Lord Mayor of Perth

Withers was appointed a Privy Counsellor in 1977. He retired from federal politics at the 1987 double dissolution, and was subsequently elected Lord Mayor of Perth, in which role he served from 1991 until the council's dissolution in 1994. He was also a monarchist delegate to the 1998 Constitutional Convention.

Having served as president of the WA Liberal Party from 1961 to 1965, Withers made an unsuccessful attempt to return to this position in 1995 when he challenged incumbent and future state Liberal leader David Honey.

== Personal life ==
In 1953, Withers married Shirley Jones, with whom he had three children.

Withers died in Perth, Western Australia, on 15 November 2014, aged 90.

Political offices
Preceded by Gordon Bryant	Minister for the Capital Territory; 1975	Succeeded by Eric Robinson
Preceded by Doug McClelland	Special Minister of State; 1975	Title abolished
Preceded by Tom Drake-Brockman	Minister for Administrative Services; 1975–1978	Succeeded by Peter Durack
Preceded by Frank Stewart	Vice-President of the Executive Council; 1975–1978	Succeeded by John Carrick
Party political offices
Preceded by Ken Anderson	Leader of the Liberal Party in the Senate; 1972–1978	Succeeded by John Carrick
Civic offices
Preceded by Chas Hopkins	Lord Mayor of Perth; 1991–1994	Succeeded by Peter Nattrass
