= Bill Heatley =

Australian politician (1920–1971)

Senator for Queensland
- In office 14 April 1966 – 30 June 1968
- Preceded by: Bob Sherrington

Member of the Queensland Legislative Assembly for Albert
- In office 14 February 1970 – 29 October 1971
- Preceded by: Cec Carey
- Succeeded by: Bill D'Arcy

Personal details
- Born: William Clarence Heatley; 11 July 1920 Townsville, Queensland, Australia
- Died: 29 October 1971 (aged 51) Surfers Paradise, Queensland, Australia
- Party: Liberal
- Spouse: Barbara Patricia Haynes (m.1944)
- Occupation: Company director

William Clarence Heatley (11 July 1920 – 29 October 1971) was an Australian politician.

== Early life ==
Born in Townsville, Queensland, Heatley was educated at All Souls School in Charters Towers.

After serving in the military 1940–1945, he became a grazier at Warwick and Miles, as well as a company director.

== Politics ==
On 14 April 1966, Heatley was appointed to the Australian Senate as a Liberal Senator for Queensland, filling the casual vacancy caused by the death of Liberal Senator Bob Sherrington. The Australian Constitution dictated that a special Senate election had to be held at the same time as the lower house election in 1966, in which Heatley easily defeated Labor candidate and future Senator Bertie Milliner. Heatley held the seat until his defeat in 1967, taking effect in 1968. In 1970, he entered the Legislative Assembly of Queensland as the member for Albert, but died in 1971.

== Later life ==
Heatley died on 29 October 1971, aged 51, at Surfers Paradise on the Gold Coast.

Parliament of Queensland
Preceded by Cec Carey	Member for Albert; 1970–1971	Succeeded by Bill D'Arcy
