= Giuseppe Di Salvo =

Australian politician

- Born: 19 April 1902; Lipari off Sicily
- Died: 27 August 1988
- Occupation(s): Naval captain and campaigner for immigrants

Giuseppe Di Salvo (19 April 1902 – 27 August 1988) was an Italian-born Australian merchant naval captain and campaigner for immigrants.

He was born on Lipari off Sicily to builder Sebastiano Di Salvo and Annunziata Virgona. He became a merchant captain, travelling widely and spending four years (1928–1932) in the United States. He married Elena Maria Rampolla at Palermo on 30 October 1934. He opposed fascism during World War II and was exiled to Lipari, where he joined the Italian resistance movement. He later fought with the Americans during the Allied invasion at Salerno and Anzio. He moved to Melbourne in 1951 and taught English to immigrants before returning to sea in 1954.

Naturalised in 1958, Di Salvo joined the Australian Labor Party and founded Il Progresso (Italo-Australiano), an Italian-language labour newspaper. He ran unsuccessfully for the Senate in 1966 in an unwinnable position. In 1972 he founded the Instituto Nazionale Assistenza Sociale, which served as the Australian branch of Italian labour organisations; he was awarded the Order of Merit of the Italian Republic in 1975. He died in Thornbury in 1988.
