= Liberal Reform Group =

- Spokesperson: Gordon Barton
- Founded: November 1966
- Dissolved: July 1969
- Merged into: Australia Party
- Ideology: Anti-conscription; Anti-war

The Liberal Reform Group, later known as the Australian Reform Movement, was a minor Australian political party and predecessor to the Australia Party, which in turn was a predecessor to the Australian Democrats. It was founded by Gordon Barton, transport entrepreneur Ken Thomas, shark meshing contractor Nickolai Gorshenin, writer Kenneth Cook and a number of disaffected members of the Liberal Party, alienated by the Liberals' support for conscription in the Vietnam War. After contesting the 1966 federal election as the Liberal Reform Group, the party contested the 1967 Senate election as the Australian Reform Movement, but had become the Australia Party by 1969.

== History ==
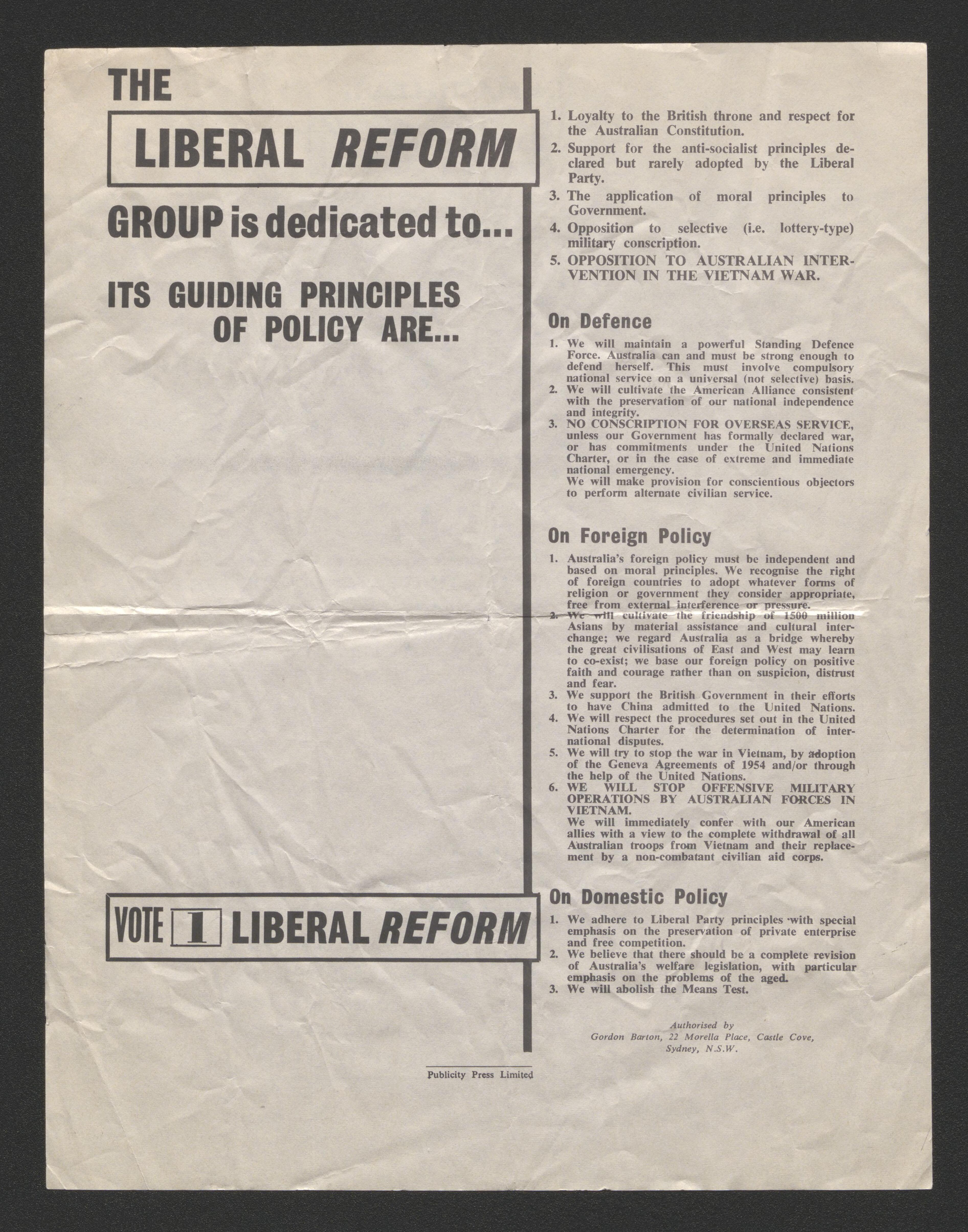
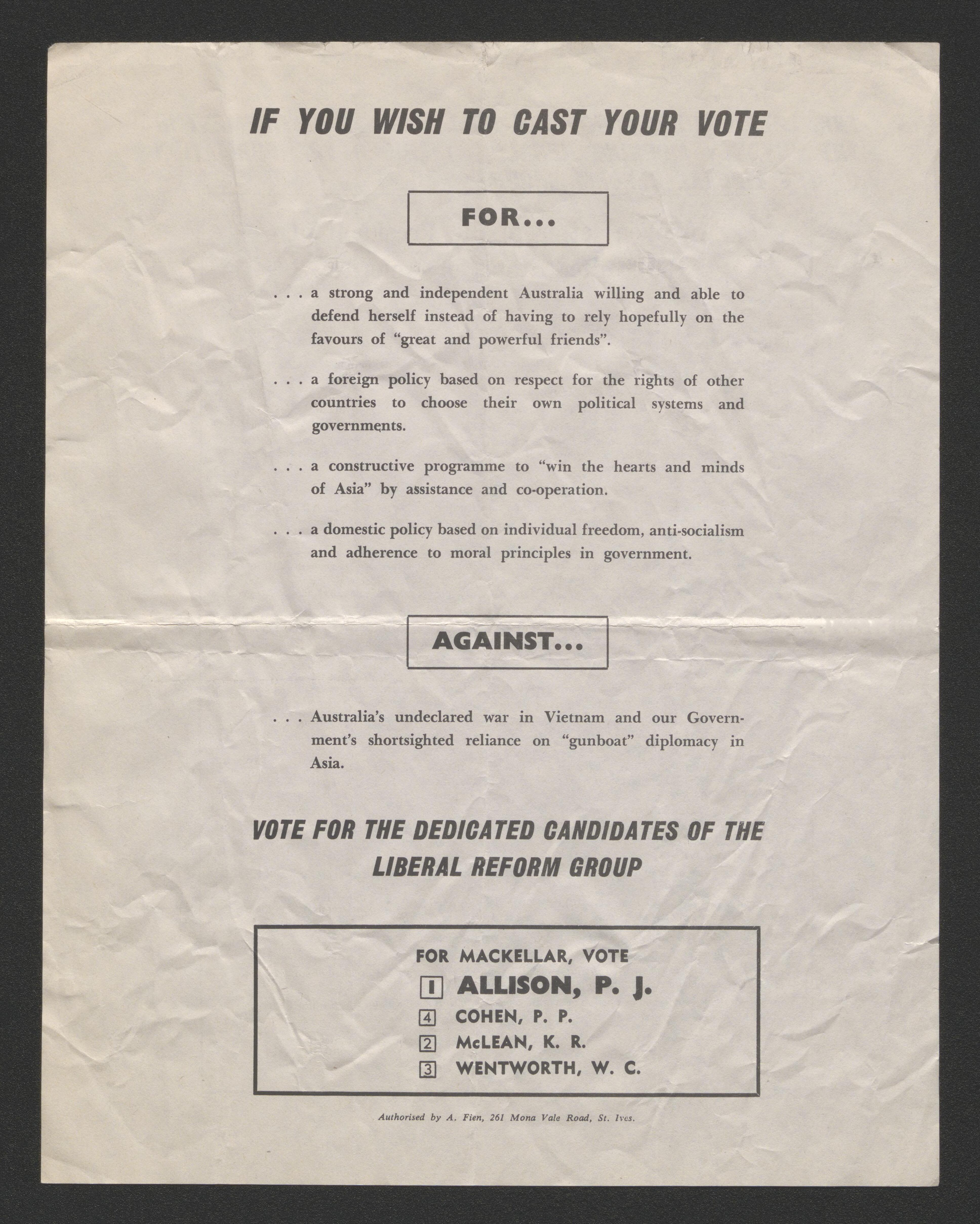
Campaign material used at the 1966 federal election

The Liberal Reform Group originated from a newspaper advertisement in the Sydney Morning Herald placed by IPEC managing director Gordon Barton on 3 November 1966, as an open letter to President Lyndon B.Johnson, then visiting Australia. The President was visiting at the height of the Vietnam War and was seeking to consolidate Australia's co-operation in the war. In a climate of anti-war protest, at least in Sydney, the open letter drew such strong support that Barton established Liberal Reform and called for "independent Liberal" candidates to contest the upcoming federal election on a platform of opposition to conscription and the Vietnam War. Funding for this advertisement and public campaigning is detailed on Australia Party page.

The new group was immediately attacked by Prime Minister Harold Holt and Treasurer William McMahon as pro-socialist and a front for the Australian Labor Party (ALP). However, the president of its Victorian branch subsequently announced that it would support the Coalition government on domestic issues. The party's policy speech was delivered by journalist Francis James, who stood against McMahon in the seat of Lowe.

For the 1966 federal election, the Liberal Reform Group nominated Senate candidates only in New South Wales and Victoria, and for Lower House primarily in government-held seats. For NSW there were five candidates including Gordon Barton, Peter Mason and Harry Seidler. Seidler was already prominent in public affairs, notably Jørn Utzon plans for the Sydney Opera House, and Peter Mason was a public figure opposed to conscription and war. On Australia's involvement in the Vietnam War, Seidler declared "There is a time when one is so utterly appalled by the role the government plays in foreign policy and in Vietnam in particular that one decides to do what one can to present a saner approach to people. I think the course we are following is the worst possible one for us, situated as we are in Asia. What we are doing is barbarous."

The Liberal Party unsuccessfully took out an injunction against the group's how-to-vote cards, claiming they were misleading as the word "Reform" was less visible than the word "Liberal".

At the 1967 election, the Liberal Reform NSW Senate candidates had polled just over two percent of the vote. By October 1967, the Liberal Reform Group was using the name "Australian Reform Movement" (ARM). A Canberra branch of the movement was formed in April 1969. On 20 July 1969, following discussions which had begun the previous month, it was announced that the ARM would merge with the supporters of independent senator Reg Turnbull to form a new political party, the Australia Party, with Turnbull as its leader and sole parliamentary representative. Extending the earlier aims of the Liberal Reform Group to end conscription and withdraw from Vietnam the new party's platform was "to liberalise abortion laws, end conscription, eliminate censorship, protect the environment and improve city planning."
