= Charles Sandford (politician) =

Australian politician

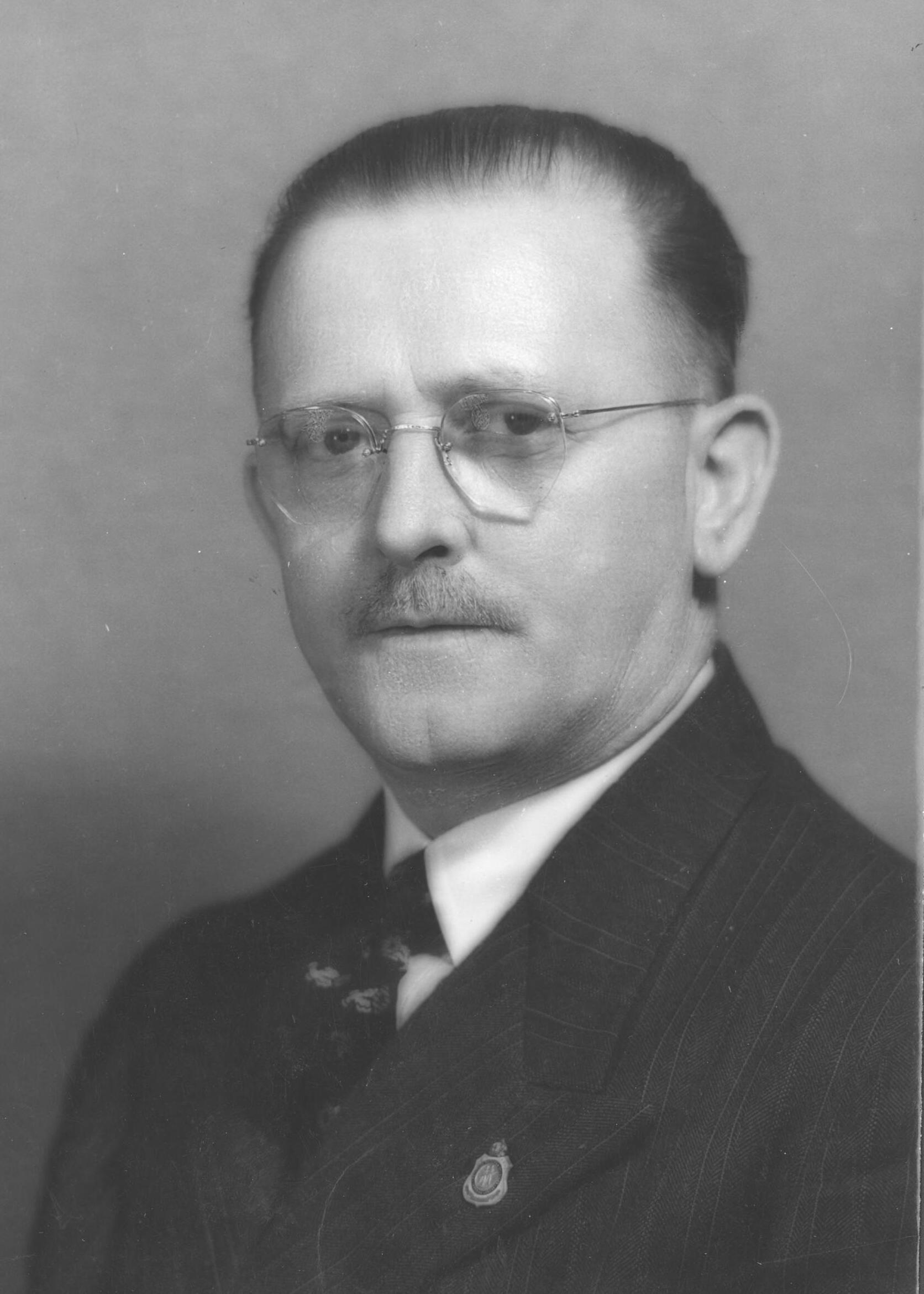

Senator for Victoria
- In office 1 July 1947 – 30 June 1956
- In office 6 June 1957 – 22 October 1966
- Preceded by: Jack Devlin
- Succeeded by: George Poyser

Personal details
- Born: 11 September 1895 Creswick, Victoria
- Died: 22 October 1966 (aged 71) Brisbane, Queensland, Australia
- Party: Australian Labor Party
- Occupation: Railway worker

Charles Walter Sandford (11 September 1895 – 22 October 1966) was an Australian politician.

Born in Creswick, Victoria, he received a primary education before becoming a railway worker. He served in the military from 1914 to 1918, and returned as an official with the Australian Railways Union. During World War II he was a public servant.

In 1946 he was elected to the Australian Senate as a Labor Senator for Victoria, taking his seat in 1947. He was defeated in 1955 (taking effect in 1956), but on 6 June 1957 he returned to the Senate, appointed to the casual vacancy caused by the death of Labor Senator Jack Devlin.

In 1966, Sandford fell ill on board a flight from Hong Kong to Sydney, returning from the Inter-Parliamentary Union conference in Tehran; he died on 22 October at the Royal Brisbane Hospital. George Poyser was appointed to replace him.
