= Bob Sherrington =

Australian politician (1902–1966)

Senator for Queensland
- In office 1 July 1962 – 16 March 1966
- Succeeded by: Bill Heatley

Personal details
- Born: 21 January 1902 Maryborough, Queensland, Australia
- Died: 16 March 1966 (aged 64) Brisbane, Queensland, Australia
- Party: Liberal
- Occupation: Cane grower

Robert Duncan Sherrington (21 January 1902 – 16 March 1966) was an Australian politician. He was a member of the Liberal Party and served as a Senator for Queensland from 1962 until his death in 1966. He was the party's president from 1964 to 1966. Prior to entering politics he worked in the Queensland sugar industry.

== Early life ==
Sherrington was born on 21 January 1902 in Maryborough, Queensland. He was the son of Mary Ellen (née Crane) and James McGowan Sherrington. His father was a driller who later became a cane farmer.

Sherrington was raised on his family's cane farm on the Elliott River. He attended school in Bundaberg and subsequently began working in the local sugar industry. He initially worked as a laboratory chemist at various sugar mills, then in 1932 became a field cane inspector. In 1940 he was appointed chief inspector for Pioneer Sugar Mills Ltd. Sherrington acquired his own cane farm on the Burdekin River in 1943. He was an officeholder in the progress associations for Maidavale and the Shire of Ayr.

== Politics ==
Sherrington served as chairman of the Liberal Party's North Queensland zone from 1954 to 1959. He was a member of the state executive and federal council.

At the 1961 federal election, Sherrington was elected to a six-year Senate term commencing on 1 July 1962. He defeated Democratic Labor Party candidate Vince Gair for the final vacancy in Queensland. In the Senate, Sherrington advocated for the development of North Queensland and spoke frequently on agriculture and rural matters. He supported scientific farming principles and called for a CSIRO laboratory to be established in Townsville.

Sherrington was elected state president of the Liberal Party in 1964. With support from Prime Minister Robert Menzies, the party grew rapidly in Queensland during his tenure and increasingly came into conflict with the Country Party, its federal coalition partner. In the lead-up to the 1966 state election he announced that the party would stand candidates against incumbent Country MPs and publicly clashed with Country Party figures on several occasions.

== Personal life ==
In 1927, Sherrington married Muriel Whittred, with whom he had five children. He died in Brisbane on 16 March 1966, aged 64.
