= Peter Sim =

Australian politician

Peter Sim CBE
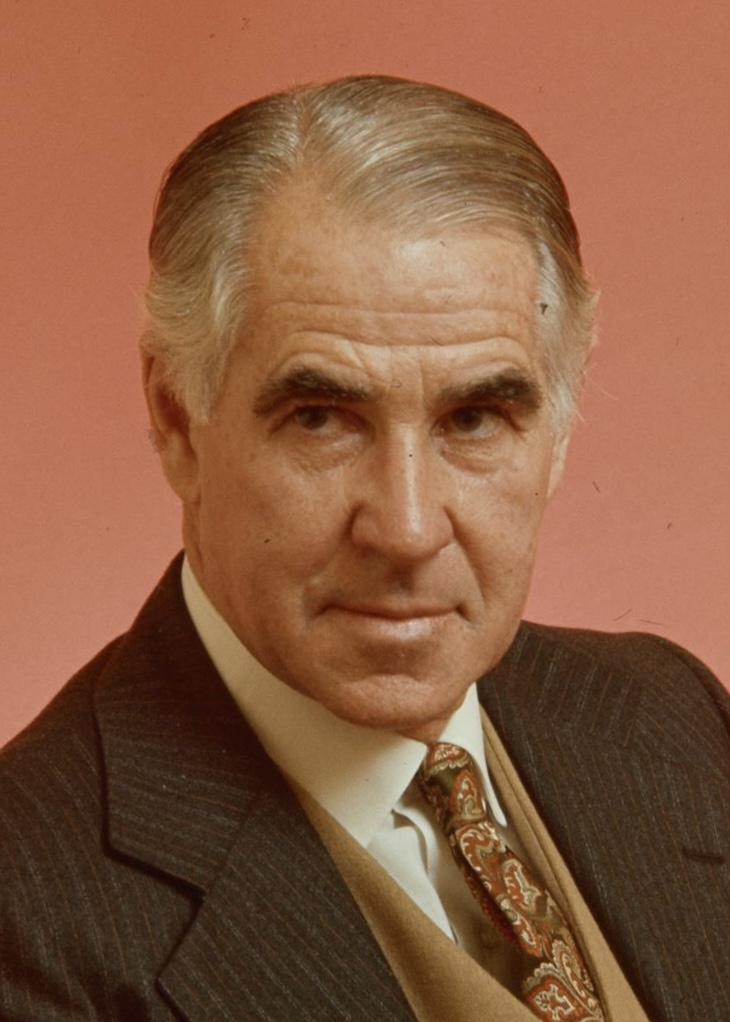
- Sim in 1974

Senator for Western Australia
- In office 26 November 1964 – 30 June 1981
- Preceded by: Seddon Vincent

Personal details
- Born: John Peter Sim; 21 June 1917 Colac, Victoria, Australia
- Died: 29 July 2015 (aged 98)
- Party: Liberal
- Spouse: Paula Clarkson (m. 1968)
- Occupation: Farmer, soldier

Military service
- Allegiance: Australia
- Branch/service: Australian Army
- Years of service: 1941–1946
- Rank: Lieutenant
- Unit: 23rd/21st Battalion; 14th/32nd Battalion; 3rd New Guinea Infantry Battalion
- Battles/wars: World War II

John Peter Sim, CBE (21 June 1917 – 29 July 2015) was an Australian politician. Born in Colac, Victoria, he was a farmer in Western Australia before serving in the military 1941–1946. He was Vice-President of the Western Australian Liberal Party 1960–1962. On 26 November 1964, he was appointed to the Australian Senate as a Liberal Senator for Western Australia, filling the casual vacancy caused by the death of Senator Seddon Vincent. The Australian Constitution dictated that a special Senate election had to be held at the same time as the lower house 1966 election, but Sim was re-elected. He held the seat until his retirement in 1980.

== Early life ==
Sim was born on 21 January 1917 in Colac, Victoria. He was one of twin sons born to Grace Maria (née Plowman) and John Percy Sim. His father had a farming and grazing property at Ondit near Colac.

Sim was raised in Melbourne, attending a parish school at Murrumbeena and a local state school before completing his secondary education at Scotch College. He left school in 1930 to work on the family farming properties. In March 1941, Sim enlisted in the Australian Imperial Force (AIF), having previously served in the Militia. He served with the 23rd/21st Battalion in Victoria and the Northern Territory until its disbandment in August 1943. He was then transferred to the 14th/32nd Battalion and served primarily in New Guinea, including as commander of a prison in Rabaul for suspected war criminals. He concluded his service with the 3rd New Guinea Infantry Battalion from October 1945 to June 1946.

After the war's end, Sim and his brother moved to Western Australia, attracted by lower land prices. They bought wool-growing properties at Muradup and were later joined by their parents.

== Politics ==
Sim joined the Liberal Party in 1946. He first stood for parliament at the 1958 federal election, standing unsuccessfully in third place on the party's Senate ticket in Western Australia. He was elected vice-president of the Liberal and Country League in 1960 and served on the Liberal Party's federal executive from 1963 to 1964.

=== Senate ===
On 26 November 1964, Sim was appointed to the Senate to fill a casual vacancy caused by the death of Senator Seddon Vincent. He was elected to the remainder of Vincent's term at the 1966 election and won re-elected to full terms at the 1967, 1974 and 1975 elections.

Sim was a long-serving member of the Senate Standing Committee on Foreign Affairs and Defence, serving as chair from 1971 to 1973 during the McMahon government and from 1976 to 1980 during the Fraser government. He travelled frequently overseas, including 13 trips to Indonesia, and was an advocate for the importance of the Indian Ocean to Australia. He held strong views on foreign policy and contradicted government policy on occasion.

Sim crossed the floor on several occasions, including to support an Australian Labor Party (ALP) motion to amend the National Health Bill 1970 to increase federal benefits payable to hospitals treating uninsured patients and in 1977 to oppose two of the Fraser government's referendum bills.

== Later life and honours ==
Sim was president of the Western Australian branch of the Australian Institute of International Affairs for 21 years. He was a member of Murdoch University's senate from 1982 to 1991 and served on the board of Murdoch's Asia Research Centre from 1991 to 1997.

Sim was appointed a Commander of the Order of the British Empire (CBE) on 31 December 1982, for service to parliament. In 2006 he was awarded the Order of the Rising Sun (Gold and Silver Star) by the Japanese government in honour of his contributions to Australia–Japan relations.

== Personal life ==
In 1968, Sim married Paula Clarkson (née Bennecke). He died on 29 July 2015, aged 98.
