= Seddon Vincent =

Australian politician

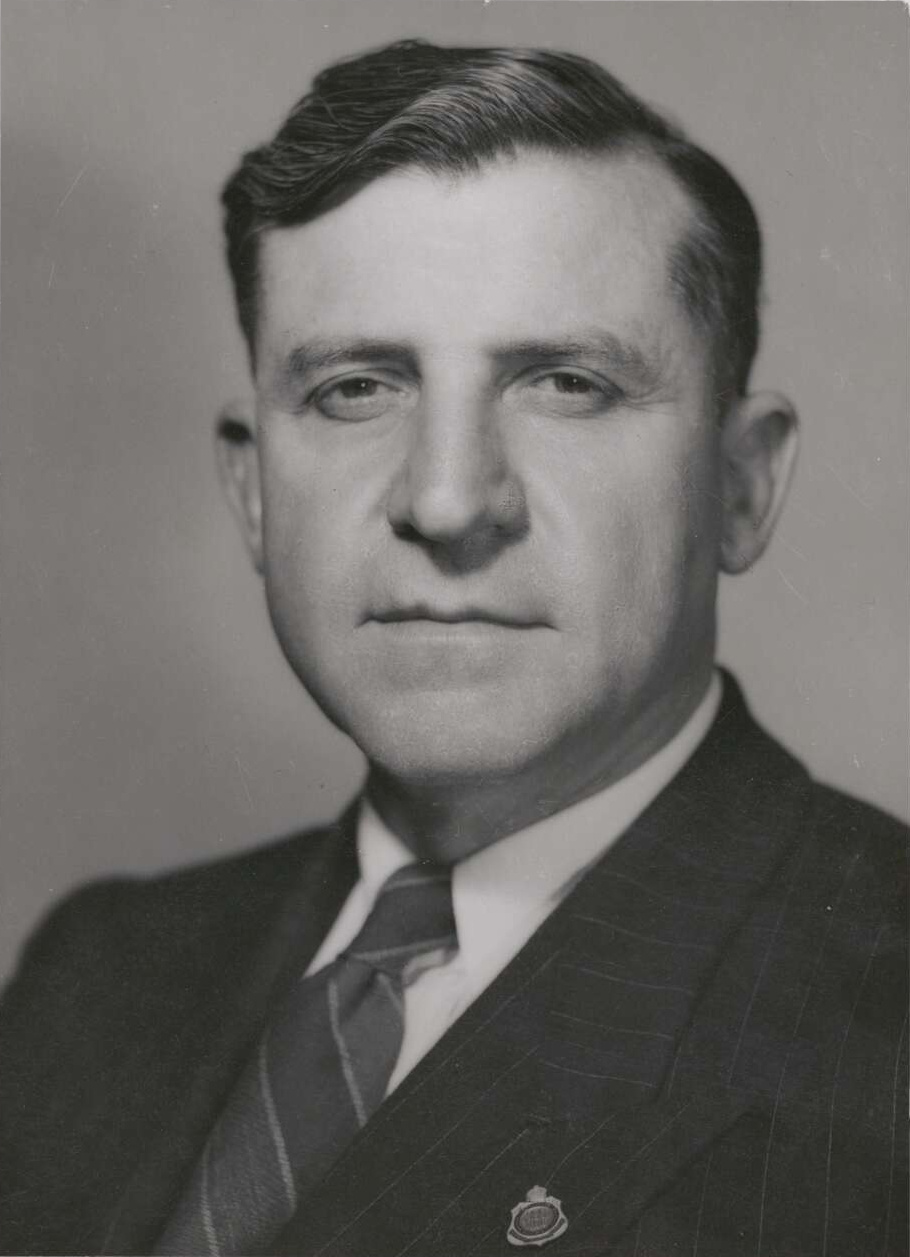

Senator for Western Australia
- In office 1 July 1950 – 9 November 1964
- Succeeded by: Peter Sim

Personal details
- Born: Victor Seddon Vincent; 1 June 1908 Leonora, Western Australia
- Died: 9 November 1964 (aged 56) Belmont, Western Australia
- Party: Liberal Party of Australia
- Education: University of Western Australia
- Occupation: Barrister

Victor Seddon Vincent (1 June 1908 – 9 November 1964) was an Australian politician. Born at Leonora, Western Australia, he was educated at Scotch College in Perth, and then the University of Western Australia, becoming a barrister. He practiced in Kalgoorlie from 1931. After serving in World War II (1939-1945), he was a member of Kalgoorlie Municipal Council, and President of the Kalgoorlie Chamber of Commerce. In 1949, he was elected to the Australian Senate as a Liberal Senator for Western Australia. He held the seat until his death in 1964; Peter Sim was appointed to replace him.

== Early life ==
Vincent was born on 1 June 1908 in the remote mining town of Leonora, Western Australia. He was one of three children born to Ethel (née Williams) and Victor Franklin Vincent. His father was an accountant and insurance agent.

Vincent's mother died in 1911 when he was a young child. His father remarried to Marion Meagher in 1914 and settled the family in Perth in 1924, initially in Swanbourne and later in Cottesloe. In the same year, his stepmother discovered that his father had been conducting an extramarital affair with Annie Ellison and had fathered a child. They separated in the same year and Victor Vincent subsequently lived with Ellison, although a judicial separation was not granted until 1929.

Vincent attended primary school in Leonora and was then sent to boarding school at Scotch College, Perth. He was a talented sportsman, excelling at Australian rules football, rugby union and surf lifesaving. He played 32 senior games for the Claremont-Cottesloe Football Club in the West Australian Football League (WAFL) from 1926 to 1928. He also played rugby union at state level and won three state titles with the Cottesloe Surf Life Saving Club.

== Legal career and military service ==
Vincent left school in 1923 and went on to study law part-time at the University of Western Australia, although he did not complete a degree. He served his articles of clerkship with barrister Leonard Goold and was admitted to the bar in 1930. During the Great Depression, Vincent practised law in the Wheatbelt town of Kellerberrin. He moved to the Eastern Goldfields town of Kalgoorlie in 1937.

Vincent enlisted in the Royal Australian Air Force (RAAF) in 1940, having previously been an officer in the Citizen Military Force since 1929. During World War II he served with the administrative and special duties branch, including briefly in New Guinea. He moved to RAAF headquarters in Melbourne in 1942 as director of staff duties. He was discharged in October 1945 with the rank of squadron leader.

== Politics ==
=== Early activities ===
Vincent was a member of the Young Australia League and toured Europe with the league in 1924 and 1925. In the early 1930s he campaigned for the Western Australian secession movement. He served on the Kalgoorlie Town Council from 1946 to 1950 and first stood for parliament at the 1946 federal election, running unsuccessfully for the Liberal Party in the seat of Kalgoorlie. The following year he was elected president of the Liberal Party's Kalgoorlie branch and as a member of its state executive.

=== Senate ===
At the 1949 federal election, Vincent was elected to a Senate term beginning on 1 July 1950. He was re-elected at the 1951 (following a double dissolution), 1955 and 1961 elections.

Vincent's most significant role was as chairman of the Senate Select Committee on the Encouragement of Australian Productions for Television. He authored the committee's final report which was released in October 1963 and became known as the Vincent Report. The report "brought together in one document a set of quite stable rhetorical figures already in circulation as to why Australia and Australians needed and were able to produce film drama" and served as a "visionary document for the writers arguing for a national film industry". The Vincent Report influenced the ultimate creation of the government-funded Australian Film Development Corporation and the Australian Film and Television School, which occurred after Vincent's death.

Vincent continued to make public appearances after being diagnosed with a terminal illness, including appearing on television to defend his committee's report. Two weeks before his death, he participated in a panel discussion in Perth and criticised parliament for neglecting Australian television.

== Personal life ==
In 1931, Vincent married Freda Treadgold; the couple had no children. Freda worked as a speech and drama teacher and the couple were active in repertory theatre, winning several awards for their amateur productions. Vincent was also a "recognised authority" on native wildflowers.

Vincent died in Belmont, Western Australia, on 9 November 1964, aged 56, following a "long illness". The Australian Film Institute's lending library was named in Vincent's honour, while John Joseph Jones's Parkerville Amphitheatre was officially named the Seddon Vincent Memorial Theatre for Australian Playwrights.
