= 1966 Australian federal election =

- 26 November 1966

All 124 seats of the Australian House of Representatives 63 seats were needed for a majority
- Registered: 6,193,881 ▲6.33%
- Turnout: 5,892,327 (95.13%) (▼0.60 pp)
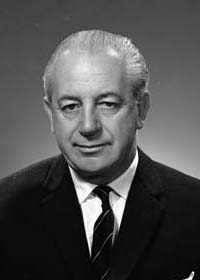

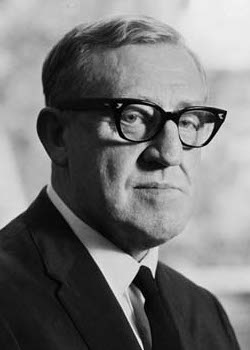
| | First party | Second party |
|---|---|---|
| Leader | Harold Holt | Arthur Calwell |
| Party | Liberal–Country Coalition | Labor |
| Leader since | 20 January 1966 | 7 March 1960 |
| Leader's seat | Higgins (Vic.) | Melbourne (Vic.) |
| Last election | 72 seats | 50 seats |
| Seats won | 82 | 41 |
| Seat change | ▲10 | ▼9 |
| Primary vote | 2,853,890 | 2,282,834 |
| Percentage | 49.98% | 39.98% |
| Swing | ▲3.94 | ▼5.49 |
| TPP | 56.90% | 43.10% |
| TPP swing | ▲4.30 | ▼4.30 |
- Results by division for the House of Representatives, shaded by winning party's margin of victory.
Prime Minister before election
Harold Holt
Liberal/Country coalition
Subsequent Prime Minister
Harold Holt
Liberal/Country coalition

A federal election was held in Australia on 26 November 1966. All 124 seats in the House of Representatives were up for election. There was no Senate election until the 1967 Australian Senate election. The incumbent Liberal–Country coalition government, led by Prime Minister Harold Holt, won an increased majority over the opposition Labor Party, led by Arthur Calwell, in a landslide. The Liberal–Country coalition two-party-preferred vote was 56.90%, its highest in its history.

This was the first and only time that a Federal Government won an eighth consecutive term in office.

Government (82) Coalition Liberal (61) Country (21) Opposition (41) Labor (41) Crossbench (1) Independent (1)

== Issues ==
Sir Robert Menzies had retired from politics in January; his successor, former treasurer Harold Holt, was stylish, debonair and popular with the electorate, contrasting sharply with the much rougher figure of Opposition Leader Arthur Calwell, who had already lost two elections.

Calwell also came across poorly on television compared to Holt, looking and sounding older than his 70 years. It did not help that he also held to the beliefs that had been central to the previous Labor Government of 1941–1949, many of which were seen as being long outdated in 1966; for example, he still defended the White Australia policy and nationalisation, and also strongly supported socialism.

These factors, along with a strong economy and initial enthusiasm for Australia's involvement in the Vietnam War, virtually guaranteed the Coalition another term. The Coalition campaigned with the slogan "Keep Australia secure and prosperous – play it safe".

The election was a landslide win for the Coalition, which won twice as many seats as Labor. The Liberals arrived two seats short of a majority in their own right, the closest that the major non-Labor party had come to governing in its own right since adopting the Liberal banner. Holt's victory was also larger than any of Menzies' eight victories, and resulted in the largest majority government in Australian history at the time. It was later seen as the electoral high point of both Holt's prime ministership and the 23 years of continuous Coalition rule.

Calwell retired to the backbench a month after the crushing election loss, and was succeeded by his deputy, Gough Whitlam.

== Results ==
House of Reps (IRV) — 1966–69—Turnout 95.13% (CV) — Informal 3.10%
| Party | First preference votes | % | Swing | Seats | Change |
|---|---|---|---|---|---|
| Liberal–Country coalition | 2,853,890 | 49.98 | +3.94 | 82 | +10 |
| Liberal | 2,291,964 | 40.14 | +3.05 | 61 | +9 |
| Country | 561,926 | 9.84 | +0.90 | 21 | +1 |
| Labor | 2,282,834 | 39.98 | –5.49 | 41 | –9 |
| Democratic Labor | 417,411 | 7.31 | –0.13 | 0 | 0 |
| Liberal Reform | 49,610 | 0.87 | +0.87 | 0 | 0 |
| Communist | 23,056 | 0.40 | –0.19 | 0 | 0 |
| Independents | 82,948 | 1.45 | +0.98 | 1 | +1 |
| Total | 5,709,749 | | | 124 | +2 |
Two-party-preferred (estimated)
| Liberal–Country coalition | Win | 56.90 | +4.30 | 82 | +10 |
| Labor | | 43.10 | −4.30 | 41 | −9 |

Independents: Sam Benson

First preference vote
| Liberal | 40.14% |
| Labor | 39.98% |
| Country | 9.84% |
| DLP | 7.31% |
| Independents | 1.45% |
| Other | 1.27% |

Two-party-preferred vote
| Coalition | 56.90% |
| Labor | 43.10% |

Parliament seats
| Coalition | 66.13% |
| Labor | 33.06% |
| Independents | 0.81% |

== Seats changing hands ==
| Seat | Pre-1966 | | | Swing | Post-1966 | | |
| Seat | Party | Member | Margin | Swing | Margin | Member | Party |
|---|---|---|---|---|---|---|---|
| Adelaide, SA | Labor | Joe Sexton | 7.2 | 10.0 | 2.8 | Andrew Jones | Liberal |
| Barton, NSW | Labor | Len Reynolds | 0.7 | 2.9 | 2.2 | Bill Arthur | Liberal |
| Batman, Vic | Labor | Sam Benson | N/A | 8.7 | 7.8 | Sam Benson | Independent |
| Eden-Monaro, NSW | Labor | Allan Fraser | 2.7 | 3.4 | 0.7 | Dugald Munro | Liberal |
| Grey, SA | Labor | Jack Mortimer | 4.8 | 7.8 | 3.0 | Don Jessop | Liberal |
| Griffith, Qld | Labor | Wilfred Coutts | 5.8 | 6.9 | 1.1 | Don Cameron | Liberal |
| Herbert, Qld | Labor | Ted Harding | 3.2 | 4.3 | 1.1 | Robert Bonnett | Liberal |
| Hughes, NSW | Labor | Les Johnson | 2.7 | 4.7 | 2.0 | Don Dobie | Liberal |
| Kennedy, Qld | Labor | Bill Riordan | 13.5 | 15.0 | 1.5 | Bob Katter | Country |
| Kingston, SA | Labor | Pat Galvin | 4.5 | 12.7 | 8.2 | Kay Brownbill | Liberal |
| Lalor, Vic | Labor | Reg Pollard | 7.0 | 7.7 | 0.7 | Mervyn Lee | Liberal |
| Northern Territory, NT | Labor | Jock Nelson | 100.0 | 51.7 | 1.7 | Sam Calder | Country |

- Members listed in italics did not contest their seat at this election.

== See also ==
- 1964 Australian Senate election
- 1967 Australian Senate election
- Candidates of the Australian federal election, 1966
- Members of the Australian House of Representatives, 1966–1969
