= 1967 Australian Senate election =

Australian federal election

- 25 November 1967

30 of the 60 seats in the Senate 31 seats needed for a majority
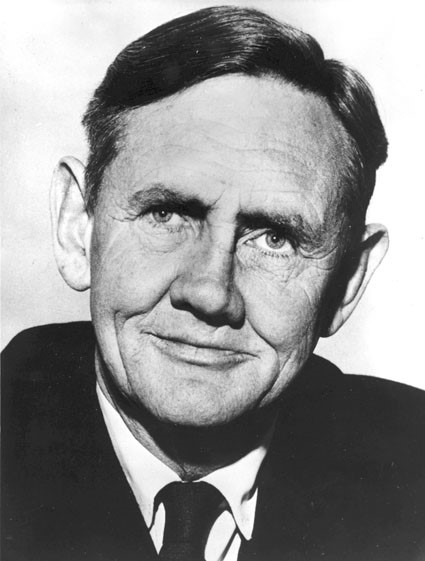

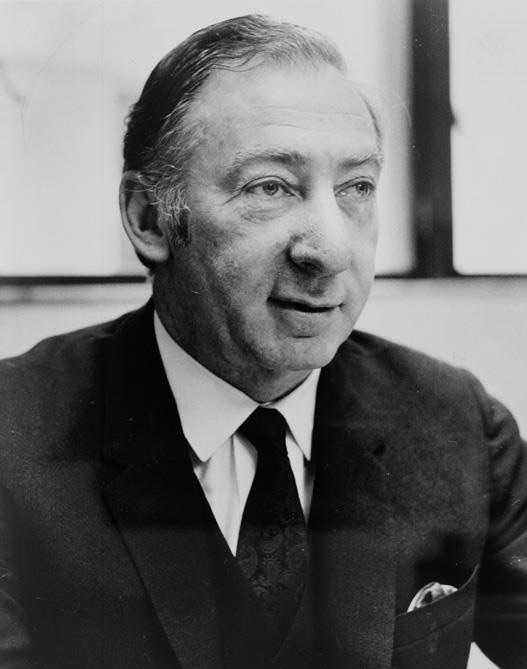

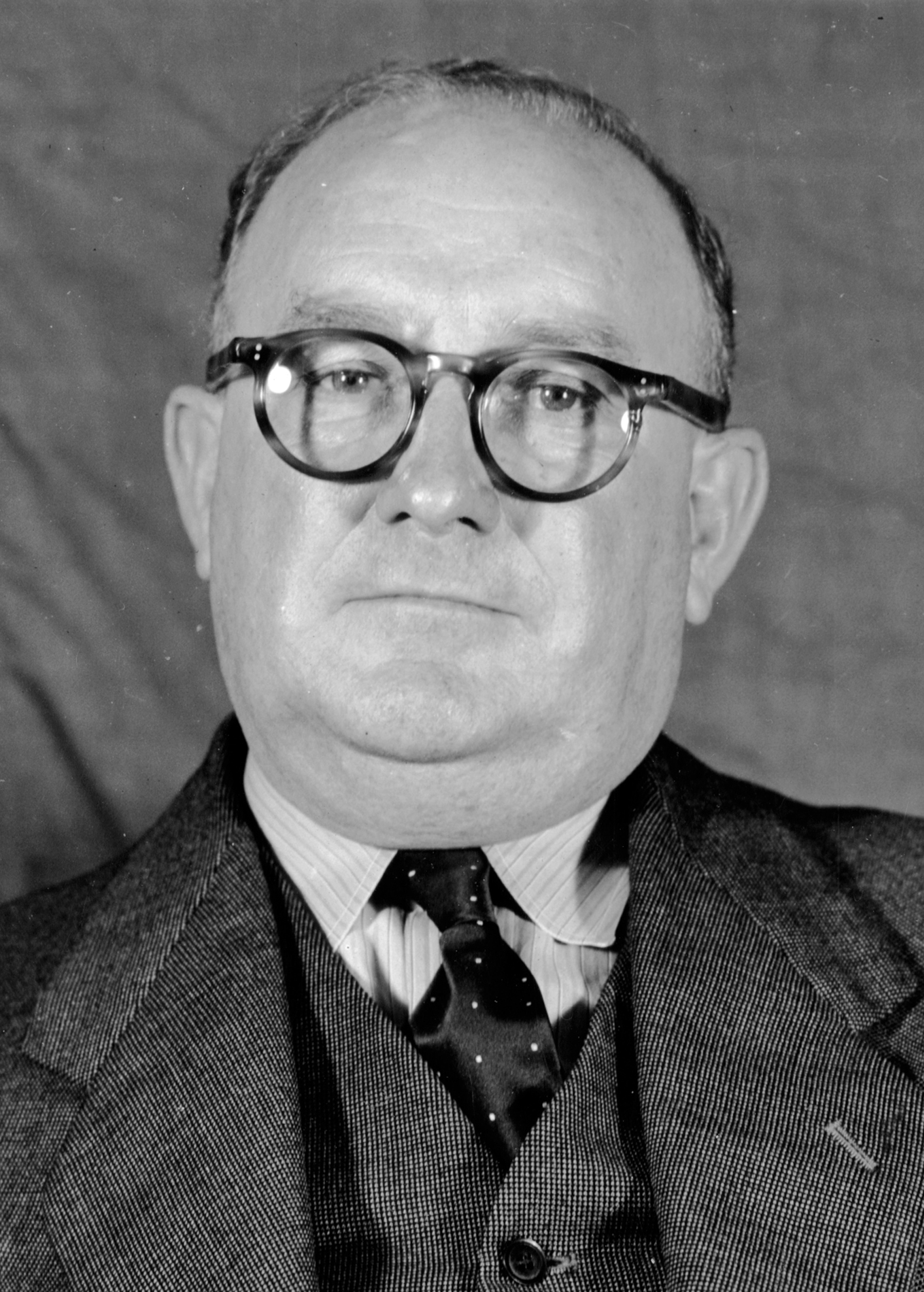
	First party	Second party	Third party
Leader	John Gorton	Lionel Murphy	Vince Gair
Party	Coalition	Labor	Democratic Labor
Seats before	30	27	2
Seats won	14	13	2
Seats after	28	27	4
Seat change	▼2	Steady	▲2
Popular vote	2,365,373	2,489,990	540,006
Percentage	42.77%	45.03%	9.77%
Swing	▼2.93pp	▲0.36pp	▲1.38pp

Elections were held on 25 November 1967 to elect half of the 60 seats in the Australian Senate for a term commencing on 1 July 1968. There was no accompanying election to the House of Representatives as the two election cycles had been out of synchronisation since 1963. The results were a setback for the government of Harold Holt. Having won a landslide victory at the House-only election the previous year, the Coalition instead lost two seats in the Senate. The Labor Party failed to make any gains in Gough Whitlam's first election as leader; the Democratic Labor Party gained two seats and held the balance of power until 1974.

Senate (STV) — 1967–70 — Turnout 95.11% (CV) — Informal 6.10%
Party	Votes	%	Swing	Seats won	Seats held	Change
Labor	2,489,990	45.03	+0.36	13	27	0
Liberal–Country coalition (total)	2,365,373	42.77	–2.93	14	28	–2
Liberal–Country joint ticket	1,870,057	33.82	+9.41	6	*	*
Liberal (separate ticket)	450,454	8.15	–11.93	7	21	–2
Country (separate ticket)	44,862	0.81	–0.40	1	7	0
Democratic Labor	540,006	9.77	+1.38	2	4	+2
Reform Movement	58,679	1.06	+1.06	0	0	0
Communist	20,648	0.37	–0.36	0	0	0
Independent / ungrouped	55,192	1.00	+0.48	1	1	0
Total	5,529,888			30	60	

Notes

- In New South Wales, Queensland, and Victoria, the coalition parties ran a joint ticket. Of the six senators elected on a joint ticket, three were members of the Liberal Party and three were members of the Country Party. In Western Australia, the coalition parties ran on separate tickets. In South Australia and Tasmania, only the Liberal Party ran a ticket.
- The sole independent elected was Reg Turnbull of Tasmania.

== See also ==
- Candidates of the Australian Senate election, 1967
- Members of the Australian Senate, 1968–1971
