= Marie Breen =

Australian politician (1902–1993)

Dame Marie Breen DBE
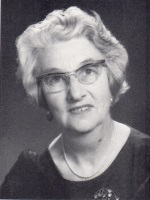

Senator for Victoria
- In office 1 July 1962 – 30 June 1968

Personal details
- Born: Marie Freda Chamberlin; 3 November 1902 St Kilda, Victoria, Australia
- Died: 17 June 1993 (aged 90) Elsternwick, Victoria, Australia
- Party: Liberal
- Other political affiliations: AWNL
- Spouse: Robert Breen (m. 1928; died 1968)
- Children: 3, including Jeannette Patrick

Dame Marie Freda Breen DBE (3 November 1902 – 17 June 1993) was an Australian politician who, following her election in 1961, became the second woman in the Australian Senate to represent the state of Victoria and the sixth female senator in Australia overall. In 1965, she became the first woman to chair an Australian Senate committee. She was noted for her commitment to improving the wellbeing of Australian women, children, and family units, as well as her commitment to community service. She worked towards greater inclusion of women in official positions and was a major advocate for the strengthening of Australia–Asia relations.

The daughter of a town clerk in St Kilda, Victoria, Breen was interested in politics from an early age; she became more politically involved after her husband, Robert Tweeddale Breen, was elected mayor of Brighton. She and her husband joined the Liberal Party when it was established in 1945. With the Liberal Party, she ran for a seat in the Senate at the 1961 federal election; she defeated Frank McManus and took office in July 1962. After retiring from the Senate in 1968 in order to care for her grievously injured husband, she devoted her life to community service and humanitarian efforts; she was appointed a Dame Commander of the Order of the British Empire in recognition of her achievements in 1979. Breen died in 1993; she was memorialised by senator Rod Kemp as a "remarkable woman with great strength of character".

== Early life ==
Marie Freda Chamberlin was born in St Kilda, Victoria, on 3 November 1902. Her mother, Jane Maud Conquest, was the Australian-born daughter of English parents and a native of Melbourne. Her father, Frederick William Chamberlin, was born in England; as a teenager, he immigrated from Devon to Australia and found employment as a town clerk in St Kilda. He intended to serve in World War I, but his enlistment was rejected due to a heart condition; he instead served in war fundraising efforts, in which Breen also participated. Breen described her mother as "warm and sympathetic" and her father as "reserved". She labelled her childhood as "happy" and recounted having interest in her father's town council work as a child. During her youth, she enjoyed books and music.

Chamberlin was a high-achieving student at St Michael's Grammar School, from which she graduated at the age of 17; after leaving school, she studied piano for a short time. Afterwards, when her older brother intended to open a private law firm, she took a course in shorthand, planning to work for him. His practice did not materialise at that time, however, and she moved on to be a law clerk for a solicitor firm, a career which she enjoyed. Through connections in the legal field, she met her husband, barrister and solicitor Robert Tweeddale Breen. The pair married in St Kilda on 12 December 1928 and had three daughters together; two of them, Prudence Griffiths and Jeannette Patrick, would also later become involved in politics at various levels. After their marriage, Breen and her husband moved to Brighton.

== Political career ==
=== Early years ===
In 1933, Breen became the secretary of the Brighton Auxiliary for the Royal Melbourne Hospital. She also became the secretary of the Australian Women's National League's (AWNL's) Brighton branch, where she met AWNL president Elizabeth Couchman. Couchman had a considerable influence on Breen, who later described Couchman as a great mentor and a brilliant leader. Breen was additionally a member of the Melbourne Marriage Guidance Council, which later became the Marriage Guidance Council of Victoria, and an executive member of the Victorian Baby Health Centres Association for 36 years. She was introduced to party politics by her husband, who she described as a "champion debater"; in 1935, he ran in the Victorian Legislative Assembly election for the seat of Collingwood, but was not elected. In August 1941, Robert was elected mayor of the City of Brighton; Breen later cited her husband's term as mayor as "good training" for her own political career and referred to him as her greatest political influence.

Breen and her husband joined the newly established Liberal Party, in 1945. She served a term as the president of the party's Federal Women’s Committee in 1952, was the president of the National Council of Women Victoria from 1954 to 1958, and was the party's vice president for the state of Victoria from 1955 until 1962. She initially had little interest in seeking election to the Senate, as she did not want to be separated from her family for long durations of time. Nonetheless, her husband eventually convinced her to seek Liberal Party preselection for the 1960 Balaclava by-election, caused by the resignation of Percy Joske; however, she failed to receive the party's preselection. At the 1961 federal election, she managed to obtain preselection for a seat in the Senate; after an involved campaign, she won the election, defeating Frank McManus. The election results were announced on 5 January 1962; her Senate term began on 1 July 1962. With her victory, Breen became the second female senator to represent Victoria, after Ivy Wedgwood, and the sixth woman to serve in the Senate overall.

=== Senator (1962–1968) ===
During Breen's period in the Senate, she heavily promoted her main focus, the wellbeing of Australia's women, children, and families, interests which she outlined in her initial speech to the Senate. Among other causes, she advocated for the abolition of Australia's marriage bar, financial support for widowed and deserted wives, and the inclusion of women in official positions. Breen was also a supporter of increases in welfare payments, especially to families, believing that familial stability was key to individual, and, by extension, national progress. Furthermore, she took an interest in the content of child-oriented television programs, concerned about their suitability for children. She was an admirer of the first female Australian senator, Dorothy Tangney, due to her work on behalf of the people of Western Australia.

Throughout her lifetime, Breen was additionally highly supportive of the strengthening of Australia–Asia relations. She involved herself in the Colombo Plan, an international organisation providing humanitarian and financial aid to developing countries, especially in Southeast Asia. She believed that Australia had an obligation to help poorer countries attain a similar standard of living. Additionally, she was the first vice president of the Australian-Asian Association, which was established in 1957. She and her husband housed two Burmese boys from Shan, Myanmar, while they studied in Australia. She was in support of anti-communist efforts in Vietnam and Indonesia, and advocated for Australian intervention in the Vietnam War. Breen represented Australia at the 1966 conference of the Asian Peoples' Anti-Communist League in Seoul.

As a senator, Breen served on numerous committees, including the Library Committee, on which she served during her entire period in the Senate, and the Select Committee on the Metric System of Weights and Measures in 1967. She also served on committees regarding topics such as housing, education, and immigration. On 30 March 1965, she became the first woman to chair an Australian Senate committee, the Printing Committee; she held that role until her retirement from the Senate in 1968. While preparing for the Select Committee on the Metric System of Weights and Measures' first convention, Breen learned that her husband had been involved in a major car crash. Following this crash, she resigned from the committee and became largely inactive in the political field, devoting much of her time towards caring for Robert. She chose not to seek reelection in the Senate in order to continue caring for him, and retired at the end of her term on 30 June 1968. Robert succumbed to his injuries three days later, dying on 2 July. Breen later lamented the decrease in female representation in the Australian Senate following her retirement.

=== After the Senate ===
Following her husband's death, Breen dedicated much of her life towards philanthropy and humanitarianism; she raised funds for the United Nations Children's Fund and coordinated the care of students relocated to Australia as part of the Colombo Plan. She was also the founder and president of the Victorian Association of the Citizens Advice Bureau from 1970 and 1978. Breen was appointed Officer of the Order of the British Empire in 1958 due to her work as the Victorian president of the National Council of Women from 1954 to 1958. She was further appointed as a Dame Commander on 16 June 1979 in general recognition of her community service. Margaret Guilfoyle, an Australian senator elected shortly after Breen, described Breen's time in the Senate as an "extension" of her long history of community service.

== Death ==
Breen died on 17 June 1993, in Elsternwick, Melbourne, at the age of 90. She had still been living in Brighton at the time of her death. Her cause of death was pneumonia. All three of her daughters outlived her. She was buried at the Brighton General Cemetery. At her funeral, Phyllis Frost was among those who paid tribute to her. She was memorialised in the Parliament of Australia by senator Rod Kemp two months after her death, who called her a "remarkable woman with great strength of character". In 2010, she was posthumously added to the Victorian Honour Roll of Women.

== See also ==
- Women in the Australian Senate
