= Women in the Australian Senate =

There have been 127 women in the Australian Senate since the establishment of the Parliament of Australia. Women have had the right to stand for federal parliament since 1902, and there were three female candidates for the Senate at the 1903 federal election (Vida Goldstein, Nellie Martel, and Mary Moore-Bentley). However, it was not until Dorothy Tangney's victory at the 1943 federal election that a woman was elected. Since then, all states and territories have had multiple female senators – in chronological order: Western Australia (1943), Queensland (1947), Victoria (1950), South Australia (1955), Tasmania (1975), the Australian Capital Territory (1975), New South Wales (1987), and the Northern Territory (1998).

== History ==
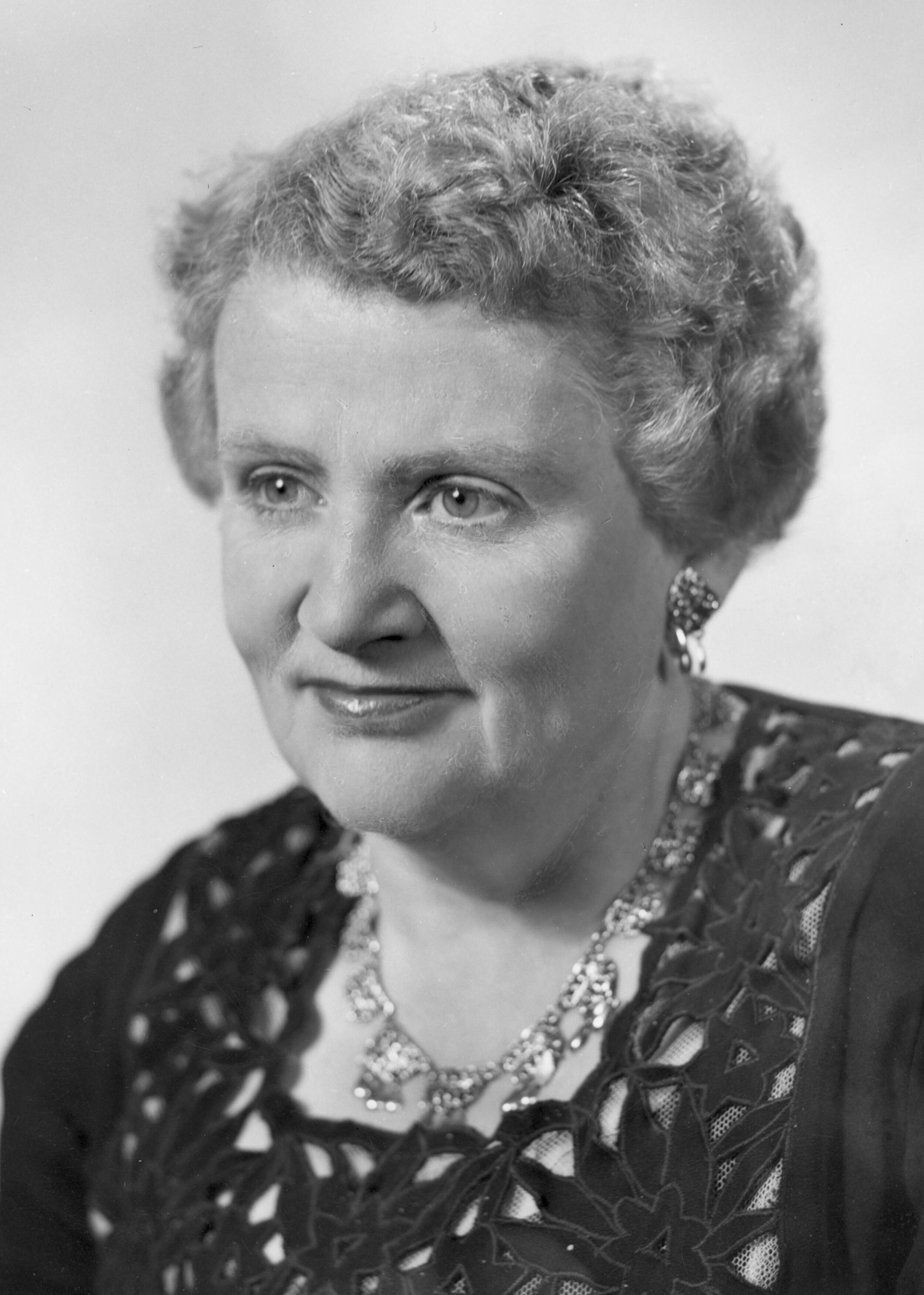
Dame Dorothy Tangney, the first woman in the Australian Senate

The passage of the Commonwealth Franchise Act allowed women to both vote and stand for election to the Parliament of Australia. Three women stood unsuccessfully as independents or as representatives of minor parties for election to the Senate for the 1903 election. Nellie Martel and Mary Ann Moore-Bentley of New South Wales ran, each earning around 18,000 votes, with the leading man winning roughly 190,000 votes. Vida Goldstein, from Victoria, ran and gained 51,497 votes, which was roughly half the votes the winning man gained. She then ran unsuccessfully again in 1910 and 1917 after a short stint attempting to breakthrough into the House of Representatives. In 1919, Mary McMahon of NSW ran unsuccessfully, and was not followed by another woman candidate until 1934 saw Lillie Beirne (NSW) and Joanna Helbach (QLD) run. Following this, Jeanne Young of Western Australia ran in 1937 and Adela Walsh (NSW) and Dorothy Tangney (WA) ran in 1940. However, women were not successful in entering federal politics until World War II. The major parties did not endorse any female candidates for the Senate before the War.

The first woman to be elected to the Senate was Labor representative Dorothy Tangney in 1943; she represented Western Australia. Following Tangney's entry into politics, the Senate has continuously had women members. However, despite the success, the number of women running continued to fluctuate drastically. Prior to 1981, the proportion of women running as candidates peaked at 20% in 1977 but had a low of only 1.3% in 1953. Between the years 1943 and 1969, there were only five elections of women and Enid Lyons accounted for three of these in the House of Representatives. Despite this, 41 women were elected into the Senate between 1943 and 1980. The proportion of women in the Senate can be seen over a long time period to have drastically grown, with the 1948 Senate being composed of 5.6% women, 14.1% in 1980, 23.7% in 1990, 28.9% in 2002, and 53% in 2021.

The second woman elected to the Senate, Annabelle Rankin, also achieved a number of firsts for women: she was the first female Whip, and she was the first woman with a federal portfolio when she became Minister for Housing in 1966. In 1975, Margaret Guilfoyle became the first female cabinet minister with a portfolio. In 1996 Margaret Reid was the first woman elected as President of the Senate.

Women in the Senate have made significant changes to Australian law which have benefited women. For example, a private member's bill written by Senator Susan Ryan was crucial to the development of the Sex Discrimination Act 1984, the Affirmative Action (Equal Employment Opportunity for Women) Act 1986, the Public Service Reform Act 1984 and the Equal Employment Opportunity (Commonwealth Authorities) Act 1987.

With the appointment of Sarah Henderson to the Senate on 11 September 2019, the number of women in the chamber was equal to the number of men for the first time in history. With the resignation of Richard Di Natale and the appointment of Lidia Thorpe on 4 September 2020, the number of women (39) exceeded the number of men (37) for the first time.

== List of women in the Australian Senate ==
Names in bold type indicate Ministers and Parliamentary Secretaries. Names in italics indicate appointments made under section 15 of the Constitution, or through disqualification. Names marked with an asterisk (*) also served in the House of Representatives. Where no closing date is shown, the Senator's term of service is unexpired.

Portrait	Name (lifespan)	State	Term		How ended	Party
Portrait	Name (lifespan)	State	Term start	Term end	How ended	Party
Sen. Tangney	Dorothy Tangney (1907–1985)	(Western Australia) WA	21 August 1943	30 June 1968	Defeated	Labor
Sen. Rankin	**Annabelle Rankin** (1908–1986)	(Queensland) Qld	1 July 1947	24 April 1971	Resigned	Liberal
Sen. Robertson	Agnes Robertson (1882–1968)	(Western Australia) WA	22 February 1950	30 June 1962	Retired	Liberal
Sen. Robertson	Agnes Robertson (1882–1968)	(Western Australia) WA	22 February 1950	30 June 1962	Retired	Independent
Sen. Robertson	Agnes Robertson (1882–1968)	(Western Australia) WA	22 February 1950	30 June 1962	Retired	Country
Sen. Wedgwood	Ivy Wedgwood (1896–1975)	(Victoria (state)) Vic	22 February 1950	30 June 1971	Retired	Liberal
Sen. Buttfield	Nancy Buttfield (1912–2005)	(South Australia) SA	11 October 1955	30 June 1965	Defeated	Liberal
Sen. Buttfield	Nancy Buttfield (1912–2005)	(South Australia) SA	1 July 1968	11 April 1974	Retired	Liberal
Sen. Breen	Marie Breen (1902–1993)	(Victoria (state)) Vic	1 July 1962	30 June 1968	Retired	Liberal
Sen. Guilfoyle	**Margaret Guilfoyle** (1926–2020)	(Victoria (state)) Vic	1 July 1971	5 June 1987	Retired	Liberal
Sen. Coleman	Ruth Coleman (1931–2008)	(Western Australia) WA	18 May 1974	5 June 1987	Retired	Labor
Sen. Melzer	Jean Melzer (1926–2013)	(Victoria (state)) Vic	18 May 1974	30 June 1981	Defeated	Labor
Sen. Sullivan	Kathy Sullivan* (born 1942)	(Queensland) Qld	18 May 1974	5 November 1984	Resigned	Liberal
Sen. Ryan	**Susan Ryan** (1942–2020)	(Australian Capital Territory) ACT	13 December 1975	29 January 1988	Resigned	Labor
	Shirley Walters (1925–2017)	(Tasmania) Tas	13 December 1975	30 June 1993	Retired	Liberal
Sen. Haines	Janine Haines (1945–2004)	(South Australia) SA	14 December 1977	30 June 1978	Retired	Democrats
Sen. Haines	Janine Haines (1945–2004)	(South Australia) SA	1 July 1981	1 March 1990	Resigned	Democrats
	Jean Hearn (1921–2017)	(Tasmania) Tas	15 October 1980	30 June 1985	Retired	Labor
Sen. Bjelke-Petersen	Florence Bjelke-Petersen (1920–2017)	(Queensland) Qld	12 March 1981	30 June 1993	Retired	National
Sen. Reid	Margaret Reid (born 1935)	(Australian Capital Territory) ACT	5 May 1981	14 February 2003	Resigned	Liberal
	Patricia Giles (1928–2017)	(Western Australia) WA	1 July 1981	30 June 1993	Retired	Labor
Sen. Crowley	**Rosemary Crowley** (born 1938)	(South Australia) SA	5 March 1983	30 June 2002	Retired	Labor
	**Margaret Reynolds** (born 1941)	(Queensland) Qld	5 March 1983	30 June 1999	Retired	Labor
	Olive Zakharov (1929–1995)	(Victoria (state)) Vic	5 March 1983	6 March 1995	Died	Labor
	Sue Knowles (born 1951)	(Western Australia) WA	1 December 1984	30 June 2005	Retired	Liberal
Sen. Vanstone	**Amanda Vanstone** (born 1952)	(South Australia) SA	1 December 1984	26 April 2007	Resigned	Liberal
Sen. Vallentine	Jo Vallentine (born 1946)	(Western Australia) WA	1 July 1985	31 January 1992	Resigned	Nuclear Disarmament
Sen. Vallentine	Jo Vallentine (born 1946)	(Western Australia) WA	1 July 1985	31 January 1992	Resigned	Independent
Sen. Vallentine	Jo Vallentine (born 1946)	(Western Australia) WA	1 July 1985	31 January 1992	Resigned	Greens WA
	**Jocelyn Newman** (1937–2018)	(Tasmania) Tas	13 March 1986	1 February 2002	Resigned	Liberal
Sen. Powell	Janet Powell (1942–2013)	(Victoria (state)) Vic	26 August 1986	30 June 1993	Defeated	Democrats
Sen. Powell	Janet Powell (1942–2013)	(Victoria (state)) Vic	26 August 1986	30 June 1993	Defeated	Independent
	Sue West (born 1947)	(New South Wales) NSW	11 February 1987	5 June 1987	Defeated	Labor
	Sue West (born 1947)	(New South Wales) NSW	1 July 1990	30 June 2002	Retired	Labor
Sen. Bishop	Bronwyn Bishop* (born 1942)	(New South Wales) NSW	11 July 1987	24 February 1994	Resigned	Liberal
Sen. Jenkins	Jean Jenkins (born 1938)	(Western Australia) WA	11 July 1987	30 June 1990	Defeated	Democrats
Sen. Patterson	**Kay Patterson** (born 1944)	(Victoria (state)) Vic	11 July 1987	30 June 2008	Retired	Liberal
	Irina Dunn (born 1948)	(New South Wales) NSW	21 July 1988	30 June 1990	Defeated	Nuclear Disarmament
	Irina Dunn (born 1948)	(New South Wales) NSW	21 July 1988	30 June 1990	Defeated	Independent
	Meg Lees (born 1948)	(South Australia) SA	4 April 1990	30 June 2005	Defeated	Democrats
	Vicki Bourne (born 1954)	(New South Wales) NSW	1 July 1990	30 June 2002	Defeated	Democrats
	Cheryl Kernot* (born 1948)	(Queensland) Qld	1 July 1990	15 October 1997	Resigned	Democrats
	Karin Sowada (born 1961)	(New South Wales) NSW	29 August 1991	30 June 1993	Defeated	Democrats
Sen. Chamarette	Christabel Chamarette (born 1948)	(Western Australia) WA	12 March 1992	30 June 1996	Defeated	Greens WA
Sen. Margetts	Dee Margetts (born 1955)	(Western Australia) WA	1 July 1993	30 June 1999	Defeated	Greens WA
Sen. Troeth	**Judith Troeth** (born 1940)	(Victoria (state)) Vic	1 July 1993	30 June 2011	Retired	Liberal
	Kay Denman (born 1937)	(Tasmania) Tas	24 August 1993	30 June 2005	Retired	Labor
	Belinda Neal* (born 1963)	(New South Wales) NSW	8 March 1994	3 September 1998	Resigned	Labor
Sen. Collins	**Jacinta Collins** (born 1962)	(Victoria (state)) Victoria	3 May 1995	30 June 2005	Defeated	Labor
Sen. Collins	**Jacinta Collins** (born 1962)	(Victoria (state)) Victoria	8 May 2008	15 February 2019	Resigned	Labor
Sen. Despoja	Natasha Stott Despoja (born 1969)	(South Australia) SA	29 November 1995	30 June 2008	Retired	Democrats
Sen. Lundy	**Kate Lundy** (born 1967)	(Australian Capital Territory) ACT	2 March 1996	24 March 2015	Resigned	Labor
	Sue Mackay (born 1960)	(Tasmania) Tas	8 March 1996	27 June 2005	Resigned	Labor
Sen. Allison	Lyn Allison (born 1946)	(Victoria (state)) Vic	1 July 1996	30 June 2008	Defeated	Democrats
Sen. Coonan	**Helen Coonan** (born 1947)	(New South Wales) NSW	1 July 1996	22 August 2011	Resigned	Liberal
	Jeannie Ferris (1941-2007)	(South Australia) SA	1 July 1996	2 April 2007	Died	Liberal
	Brenda Gibbs (born 1947)	(Queensland) Qld	1 July 1996	30 June 2002	Defeated	Labor
Sen. Payne	**Marise Payne** (born 1964)	(New South Wales) NSW	9 April 1997	30 September 2023	Resigned	Liberal
	Karen Synon (born 1959)	(Victoria (state)) Vic	13 May 1997	30 June 1999	Defeated	Liberal
Sen. Crossin	Trish Crossin (born 1956)	(Northern Territory) NT	16 June 1998	6 September 2013	Retired	Labor
	**Jan McLucas** (born 1958)	(Queensland) Qld	1 July 1999	9 May 2016	Retired	Labor
	Linda Kirk (born 1967)	(South Australia) SA	1 July 2002	30 June 2008	Retired	Labor
Sen. Moore	Claire Moore (born 1956)	(Queensland) Qld	1 July 2002	30 June 2019	Retired	Labor
Sen. Nettle	Kerry Nettle (born 1973)	(New South Wales) NSW	1 July 2002	30 June 2008	Defeated	Greens
	**Ursula Stephens** (born 1954)	(New South Wales) NSW	1 July 2002	30 June 2014	Defeated	Labor
	Ruth Webber (born 1965)	(Western Australia) WA	1 July 2002	30 June 2008	Defeated	Labor
Sen. Wong	**Penny Wong** (born 1968)	(South Australia) SA	1 July 2002	present	Incumbent	Labor
Sen. Fierravanti-Wells	**Concetta Fierravanti-Wells** (born 1960)	(New South Wales) NSW	5 May 2005	30 June 2022	Retired	Liberal
	Judith Adams (1943-2012)	(Western Australia) WA	1 July 2005	31 March 2012	Died	Liberal
	Annette Hurley (born 1955)	(South Australia) SA	1 July 2005	30 June 2011	Retired	Labor
Sen. McEwen	Anne McEwen (born 1954)	(South Australia) SA	1 July 2005	2 July 2016	Retired	Labor
Sen. Milne	**Christine Milne** (born 1953)	(Tasmania) Tas	1 July 2005	10 August 2015	Resigned	Greens
Sen. Nash	**Fiona Nash** (born 1965)	(New South Wales) NSW	1 July 2005	27 October 2017	election voided	National
	Helen Polley (born 1957)	(Tasmania) Tas	1 July 2005	present	Incumbent	Labor
Sen. Siewert	Rachel Siewert (born 1961)	(Western Australia) WA	1 July 2005	6 September 2021	Resigned	Greens
	Dana Wortley (born 1959)	(South Australia) SA	1 July 2005	30 June 2011	Defeated	Labor
Sen. Brown	Carol Brown (born 1965)	(Tasmania) Tas	25 August 2005	present	Incumbent	Labor
	Sue Boyce (born 1951)	(Queensland) Qld	19 April 2007	30 June 2014	Retired	Liberal
	Mary Jo Fisher (born 1962)	(South Australia) SA	6 June 2007	14 August 2012	Resigned	Liberal
Sen. Bilyk	Catryna Bilyk (born 1959)	(Tasmania) Tas	1 July 2008	present	Incumbent	Labor
Sen. Cash	**Michaelia Cash** (born 1970)	(Western Australia) WA	1 July 2008	present	Incumbent	Liberal
Sen. Hanson-Young	Sarah Hanson-Young (born 1981)	(South Australia) SA	1 July 2008	present	Incumbent	Greens
	Helen Kroger (born 1959)	(Victoria (state)) Vic	1 July 2008	30 June 2014	Defeated	Liberal
Sen. Pratt	Louise Pratt (born 1972)	(Western Australia) WA	1 July 2008	30 June 2014	Defeated	Labor
Sen. Pratt	Louise Pratt (born 1972)	(Western Australia) WA	2 July 2016	present	Incumbent	Labor
Sen. McKenzie	**Bridget McKenzie** (born 1969)	(Victoria (state)) Vic	1 July 2011	present	Incumbent	National
Sen. Rhiannon	Lee Rhiannon (born 1951)	(New South Wales) NSW	1 July 2011	15 August 2018	Resigned	Greens
Sen. Singh	Lisa Singh (born 1972)	(Tasmania) Tas	1 July 2011	30 June 2019	Defeated	Labor
	Anne Urquhart (born 1957)	(Tasmania) Tas	1 July 2011	28 March 2025	Resigned	Labor
Sen. Waters	Larissa Waters (born 1977)	(Queensland) Qld	1 July 2011	18 July 2017	Resigned	Greens
Sen. Waters	Larissa Waters (born 1977)	(Queensland) Qld	6 September 2018	present	Incumbent	Greens
Sen. Wright	Penny Wright (born 1968)	(South Australia) SA	1 July 2011	9 September 2015	Resigned	Greens
	Lin Thorp (born 1953)	(Tasmania) Tas	20 June 2012	30 June 2014	Defeated	Labor
Sen. Ruston	**Anne Ruston** (born 1967)	(South Australia) SA	5 September 2012	present	Incumbent	Liberal
Sen. Lines	Sue Lines (born 1953)	(Western Australia) WA	15 May 2013	present	Incumbent	Labor
Sen. Peris	Nova Peris (born 1971)	(Northern Territory) NT	7 September 2013	9 May 2016	Retired	Labor
Sen. O'Neill	Deborah O'Neill* (born 1961)	(New South Wales) NSW	13 November 2013	present	Incumbent	Labor
Sen. Lambie	Jacqui Lambie (born 1971)	(Tasmania) Tas.	1 July 2014	14 November 2017	Resigned	Palmer United
Sen. Lambie	Jacqui Lambie (born 1971)	(Tasmania) Tas.	1 July 2014	14 November 2017	Resigned	Independent
Sen. Lambie	Jacqui Lambie (born 1971)	(Tasmania) Tas.	1 July 2014	14 November 2017	Resigned	Lambie Network
Sen. Lambie	Jacqui Lambie (born 1971)	(Tasmania) Tas.	1 July 2019	present	Incumbent	Lambie Network
Sen. Reynolds	**Linda Reynolds** (born 1965)	(Western Australia) WA	1 July 2014	present	Incumbent	Liberal
Sen. Rice	Janet Rice (born 1960)	(Victoria (state)) Vic	1 July 2014	19 April 2024	Resigned	Greens
Sen. Gallagher	Katy Gallagher (born 1970)	(Australian Capital Territory) ACT	26 March 2015	9 May 2018	Resigned	Labor
Sen. Gallagher	Katy Gallagher (born 1970)	(Australian Capital Territory) ACT	18 May 2019	present	incumbent	Labor
Sen. McAllister	Jenny McAllister (born 1973)	(New South Wales) NSW	6 May 2015	present	Incumbent	Labor
	Joanna Lindgren (born 1969)	(Queensland) Qld	21 May 2015	2 July 2016	Defeated	Liberal
Sen. Hanson	Pauline Hanson* (born 1954)	(Queensland) Qld	2 July 2016	present	Incumbent	One Nation
Sen. Hume	**Jane Hume** (born 1971)	(Victoria (state)) Vic	2 July 2016	present	Incumbent	Liberal
Sen. Kakoschke-Moore	Skye Kakoschke-Moore (born 1985)	(South Australia) SA	2 July 2016	22 November 2017	Resigned	Xenophon Team
Sen. McCarthy	Malarndirri McCarthy (born 1970)	(Northern Territory) NT	2 July 2016	present	Incumbent	Labor
Sen. Kitching	Kimberley Kitching (1970–2022)	(Victoria (state)) Vic	25 October 2016	10 March 2022	Died	Labor
Sen. Gichuhi	Lucy Gichuhi (born 1962)	(South Australia) SA	19 April 2017	30 June 2019	Defeated	Family First
Sen. Gichuhi	Lucy Gichuhi (born 1962)	(South Australia) SA	19 April 2017	30 June 2019	Defeated	Independent
Sen. Gichuhi	Lucy Gichuhi (born 1962)	(South Australia) SA	19 April 2017	30 June 2019	Defeated	Liberal
Sen. Keneally	Kristina Keneally (born 1968)	(New South Wales) NSW	14 February 2018	13 April 2022	Resigned	Labor
Sen. Stoker	**Amanda Stoker** (born 1980)	(Queensland) Qld	21 March 2018	30 June 2022	Defeated	Liberal
Sen. Faruqi	Mehreen Faruqi (born 1963)	(New South Wales) NSW	15 August 2018	present	Incumbent	Greens
	Wendy Askew (born 1963)	(Tasmania) Tas	6 March 2019	present	Incumbent	Liberal
	Sam McMahon (born 1967)	(Northern Territory) NT	18 May 2019	21 May 2022	Defeated	Country Liberal
	Claire Chandler (born 1990)	(Tasmania) Tas	1 July 2019	present	Incumbent	Liberal
	Perin Davey (born 1972)	(New South Wales) NSW	1 July 2019	30 June 2025	Defeated	National
	Nita Green (born 1983)	(Queensland) Qld	1 July 2019	present	Incumbent	Labor
	Hollie Hughes (born 1975)	(New South Wales) NSW	1 July 2019	present	Incumbent	Liberal
	Susan McDonald (born 1970)	(Queensland) Qld	1 July 2019	present	Incumbent	National
	Marielle Smith (born 1986)	(South Australia) SA	1 July 2019	present	Incumbent	Labor
Sen. Walsh	Jess Walsh (born 1971)	(Victoria (state)) Vic	1 July 2019	present	Incumbent	Labor
Sen. Henderson	Sarah Henderson* (born 1964)	(Victoria (state)) Vic	11 September 2019	present	Incumbent	Liberal
Sen. Thorpe	Lidia Thorpe (born 1973)	(Victoria (state)) Vic	4 September 2020	present	Incumbent	Greens
Sen. Thorpe	Lidia Thorpe (born 1973)	(Victoria (state)) Vic	4 September 2020	present	Incumbent	Independent
Sen. Cox	Dorinda Cox (born 1976)	(Western Australia) WA	14 September 2021	present	Incumbent	Greens
Sen. Cox	Dorinda Cox (born 1976)	(Western Australia) WA	14 September 2021	present	Incumbent	Labor
	Karen Grogan (born ?)	(South Australia) SA	21 September 2021	present	Incumbent	Labor
Sen. Stewart	Jana Stewart (born 1987)	(Victoria (state)) Vic	6 April 2022	present	Incumbent	Labor
Sen. Price	Jacinta Nampijinpa Price (born 1980)	(Northern Territory) NT	21 May 2022	present	Incumbent	Country Liberal
Sen. Allman-Payne	Penny Allman-Payne (born 1970)	(Queensland) Qld	1 July 2022	present	Incumbent	Greens
Sen. Liddle	Kerrynne Liddle (born 1967)	(South Australia) SA	1 July 2022	present	Incumbent	Liberal
Sen. Payman	Fatima Payman (born 1995)	(Western Australia) WA	1 July 2022	present	Incumbent	Labor
Sen. Payman	Fatima Payman (born 1995)	(Western Australia) WA	1 July 2022	present	Incumbent	Independent
Sen. Payman	Fatima Payman (born 1995)	(Western Australia) WA	1 July 2022	present	Incumbent	Australia's Voice
Sen. Pocock	Barbara Pocock (born 1955)	(South Australia) SA	1 July 2022	present	Incumbent	Greens
Sen. Tyrrell	Tammy Tyrrell (born 1970)	(Tasmania) Tas	1 July 2022	present	Incumbent	Lambie Network
Sen. Tyrrell	Tammy Tyrrell (born 1970)	(Tasmania) Tas	1 July 2022	present	Incumbent	Independent
Sen. Tyrrell	Tammy Tyrrell (born 1970)	(Tasmania) Tas	1 July 2022	present	Incumbent	Labor
Sen. White	Linda White (1959/1960–2024)	(Victoria (state)) Vic	1 July 2022	29 February 2024	Died	Labor
Sen. Kovačić	Maria Kovačić (born 1970)	(New South Wales) NSW	31 May 2023	present	Incumbent	Liberal
Sen. Hodgins-May	Steph Hodgins-May (born 1985)	(Victoria (state)) Vic	1 May 2024	present	Incumbent	Greens
	Lisa Darmanin (born ?)	(Victoria (state)) Vic	29 May 2024	present	Incumbent	Labor
	Leah Blyth (born ?)	(South Australia) SA	6 February 2025	present	Incumbent	Liberal
	Michelle Ananda-Rajah (born 1972)	(Victoria (state)) Vic	1 July 2025	present	Incumbent	Labor
	Jessica Collins (born ?)	(New South Wales) NSW	1 July 2025	present	Incumbent	Liberal
	Corinne Mulholland (born 1987)	(Queensland) Qld	1 July 2025	present	Incumbent	Labor
Sen. Walker	Charlotte Walker (born 2004)	(South Australia) SA	1 July 2025	present	Incumbent	Labor
Sen. Whiteaker	Ellie Whiteaker (born ?)	(Western Australia) WA	1 July 2025	present	Incumbent	Labor

== Proportion of women in the Senate ==
Numbers and proportions are as they were directly after the beginning of Senate terms and do not take into account deaths, resignations, appointments, defections or other changes in membership. As senators typically serve six-year terms, in the absence of a double dissolution, the numbers of female senators overlap two "terms". State-based Coalition parties that caucus with one of the major parties (Liberal National Party, Country Liberal Party) have been included in the Liberals' or Nationals' totals.

Term	Labor			Liberal			National			Democrats			Greens			Others			Total		
Term	Women	Total	%	Women	Total	%	Women	Total	%	Women	Total	%	Women	Total	%	Women	Total	%	Women	Total	%
1944–1947	1	22	4.5%	0	12	0.0%	0	2	0.0%	0	0	0.0%	0	0	0.0%	0	0	0.0%	1	36	2.8%
1947–1950	1	33	3.0%	1	2	50.0%	0	1	0.0%	0	0	0.0%	0	0	0.0%	0	0	0.0%	2	36	5.6%
1950–1951	1	34	2.9%	3	21	14.3%	0	5	0.0%	0	0	0.0%	0	0	0.0%	0	0	0.0%	4	60	6.7%
1951–1953	1	28	3.6%	3	26	11.5%	0	6	0.0%	0	0	0.0%	0	0	0.0%	0	0	0.0%	4	60	6.7%
1953–1956	1	29	3.4%	3	26	11.5%	0	5	0.0%	0	0	0.0%	0	0	0.0%	0	0	0.0%	4	60	6.7%
1956–1959	1	28	3.6%	3	24	12.5%	1	6	16.7%	0	0	0.0%	0	0	0.0%	0	2	0.0%	5	60	8.3%
1959–1962	1	26	3.8%	3	25	12.0%	1	7	14.3%	0	0	0.0%	0	0	0.0%	0	2	0.0%	5	60	8.3%
1962–1965	1	28	3.6%	4	24	16.7%	0	6	0.0%	0	0	0.0%	0	0	0.0%	0	2	0.0%	5	60	8.3%
1965–1968	1	27	3.7%	3	23	13.0%	0	7	0.0%	0	0	0.0%	0	0	0.0%	0	3	0.0%	4	60	6.7%
1968–1971	0	27	0.0%	3	21	14.2%	0	7	0.0%	0	0	0.0%	0	0	0.0%	0	5	0.0%	3	60	5.0%
1971–1974	0	26	0.0%	2	21	9.5%	0	5	0.0%	0	0	0.0%	0	0	0.0%	0	8	0.0%	2	60	3.3%
1974–1975	2	29	6.9%	2	23	8.7%	0	6	0.0%	0	0	0.0%	0	0	0.0%	0	2	0.0%	4	60	6.7%
1975–1978	3	27	11.1%	3	27	11.1%	0	8	0.0%	0	0	0.0%	0	0	0.0%	0	2	0.0%	6	64	9.4%
1978–1981	3	27	11.1%	3	28	10.7%	0	6	0.0%	0	2	0.0%	0	0	0.0%	0	1	0.0%	6	64	9.4%
1981–1983	4	27	14.8%	4	28	14.3%	1	3	33.3%	1	5	20.0%	0	0	0.0%	0	1	0.0%	10	64	15.6%
1983–1984	7	30	23.3%	4	24	16.7%	1	4	25.0%	1	5	20.0%	0	0	0.0%	0	1	0.0%	13	64	20.3%
1984–1987	6	34	17.6%	5	28	17.9%	1	5	20.0%	1	7	14.3%	0	0	0.0%	1	2	50.0%	14	76	18.4%
1987–1990	5	32	15.6%	7	24	29.2%	1	5	20.0%	3	7	42.9%	0	0	0.0%	1	3	33.3%	17	76	22.4%
1990–1993	5	32	15.6%	7	29	24.1%	1	5	20.0%	4	8	50.0%	1	1	100.0%	0	1	0.0%	18	76	23.7%
1993–1996	4	30	13.3%	7	30	23.3%	0	6	0.0%	3	7	42.9%	2	2	100.0%	0	1	0.0%	16	76	21.1%
1996–1999	9	29	31.0%	8	32	25.0%	0	5	0.0%	5	7	71.4%	1	2	50.0%	0	1	0.0%	23	76	30.3%
1999–2002	9	29	31.0%	9	32	28.1%	0	3	0.0%	4	9	44.4%	0	1	0.0%	0	2	0.0%	22	76	28.9%
2002–2005	10	28	35.7%	8	31	25.8%	0	4	0.0%	4	8	50.0%	1	2	50.0%	0	3	0.0%	23	76	30.3%
2005–2008	12	28	42.9%	8	33	24.2%	1	6	16.7%	2	4	50.0%	3	4	75.0%	0	1	0.0%	26	76	34.2%
2008–2011	14	32	43.8%	9	32	28.1%	1	5	20.0%	0	0	0.0%	3	5	60.0%	0	2	0.0%	27	76	35.5%
2011–2014	14	31	45.2%	8	28	28.6%	2	6	33.3%	0	0	0.0%	6	9	66.7%	0	2	0.0%	30	76	39.5%
2014–2016	14	25	56.0%	5	27	18.5%	2	6	33.3%	0	0	0.0%	7	10	70.0%	1	8	12.5%	29	76	38.2%
2016–2019	14	26	53.8%	6	24	25.0%	2	6	33.3%	0	0	0.0%	5	9	55.6%	3	11	27.3%	30	76	39.5%
2019–2022	16	26	61.5%	10	30	33.3%	4	5	80.0%	0	0	0.0%	5	9	55.6%	2	6	33.3%	37	76	48.7%
2022–2025	16	26	61.5%	10	26	38.5%	4	6	66.7%	0	0	0.0%	8	12	66.7%	3	6	50.0%	41	76	53.9%
2025–	19	29	65.5%	11	23	47.8%	2	4	50.0%	0	0	0.0%	6	10	60.0%	5	10	50.0%	43	76	56.6%

== See also ==
- Women and government in Australia
- Women in the Australian House of Representatives
