= Juliet Pannett =

English painter

Juliet Pannett MBE FRSA
- Born: Juliet Kathleen Somers; 15 July 1911; Hove, East Sussex
- Died: 22 August 2005 (aged 94)
- Education: Brighton College of Art
- Known for: Portrait painting

Juliet Kathleen Pannett MBE FRSA (née Somers; 15 July 1911 – 22 August 2005) was an English portrait painter.

== Background ==
Born in Hove, East Sussex, Pannett started painting at three, and wanted to be a professional artist by seventeen. She trained at Brighton College of Art in the 1920s under Louis Ginnett, and received her first artistic commission at eighteen to draw local Sussex characters for the Sussex County Magazine. Pannett maintained a studio in Hove and was elected a member of the Society of Graphic Artists in 1934. She was a professional artist until her marriage in 1938.

Pannett married Major Rick Pannett who had been injured in the First World War when he was shot in the mouth. The bullet had pierced his cheek and missed all his bones. Pannett gave up painting after the birth of her children. Suffering from depression, it was alleviated when she resumed painting. In 1949 the family moved to Croydon where she built a studio in her garage. The Pannett family later moved to Angmering in Sussex in 1964.

== Noted portraits ==
Among her subjects were Field-Marshal Montgomery, film director Jean Cocteau, athlete Chris Chataway, Louis Armstrong and Leonard Bernstein. Pannett was a keen cricketer and drew such cricketers as Maurice Tate and Bob Wyatt. Pannett preferred to paint men rather than women, describing men as "less troublesome as sitters...They never ask me not to put in their double chin or to leave out their wrinkles."

Before the televised proceedings of the House of Commons Pannett was employed by the Illustrated London News from 1957 to 1964 to sketch the events of the House. Sitting in the gallery of the Commons Pannett drew such historically significant events as Winston Churchill's last appearance in the house in 1964. Pannett later formally drew several other British Prime Ministers, including Alec Douglas-Home, who told her that he had "the biggest head in London" and could never find a hat to fit him. Later Prime Ministers painted by Pannett included Edward Heath, James Callaghan and Margaret Thatcher.

For several years around 1960, Pannett supplied the Radio Times with drawings of musicians and other figures being broadcast on BBC radio. In February 1963, she was commissioned by The Illustrated London News to do several sketches of C. S. Lewis.

She painted Queen Elizabeth II in 1989 for the Chartered Insurance Institute. Pannett had previously drawn Princes Andrew and Edward. Upon seeing the portrait Prince Philip commissioned a pastel drawing from her of the Queen for the 25th anniversary of the Independence of Malta.

== Recognition ==
Her painting career was ended by failing eyesight; her last major portrait was of General Sir John Wilsey. She was appointed a Member of the Order of the British Empire (MBE) in the 1993 New Year Honours, and was a member of the Pastel Society and a fellow of the Royal Society of Arts and an Honorary Freeman of the Worshipful Company of Painter-Stainers, who awarded her their gold medal in 1995.

At the time of her death in 2005 she was the oldest living artist to have work in the National Portrait Gallery's collection. Her husband had died in 1980, she was survived by her two children, who are both artists.

Her autobiography, My Colourful Life, was published in 2006.
