= Nellie Constance Martyn =

Australian businesswoman (1887–1926)

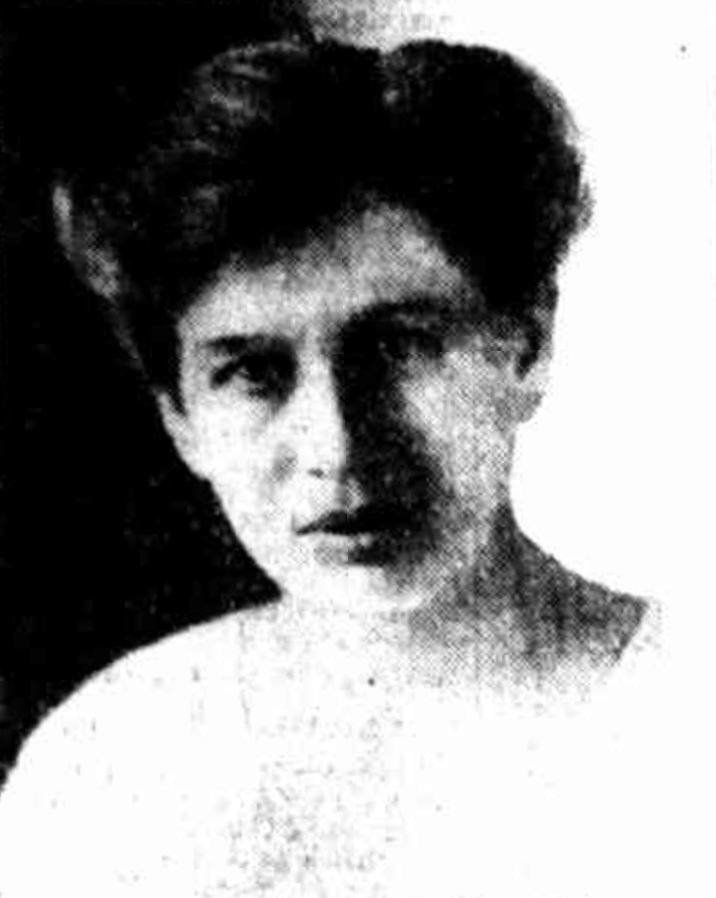
- Born: 12 June 1887; Charlton, Victoria, Australia
- Died: 28 November 1926 (aged 39); Camberwell, Victoria, Australia
- Occupations: Company managing director, feminist

Nellie Constance Martyn (12 June 1887 – 28 November 1926) was an Australian businesswoman who became managing director of Steel Company of Australia on her father's death. She was also a strong advocate for women and office bearer of a number of women's organisations.

== Early life ==
Martyn was born on 12 June 1887 in Charlton in country Victoria to Ballarat-born James and Lucy (née Partridge) Martyn. Her father worked as a schoolteacher and draper, but in 1900 he took over a steelworks in the Melbourne suburb of Brunswick.

== Career ==
From an early age, Martyn wanted to work in her father's steelworks but she was trained as a masseuse. To gain skills suitable for business, she learned shorthand and typing and then applied to her father for a job. She was given a job and became his private secretary after she discovered an error in the company's books.

Martyn developed her public speaking skills as member of the Australian Women's National League. During World War I she was active in campaigning for conscription and in 1917 was a member of the State Recruiting Committee of Victoria.

Before going overseas in 1923, her father gave Martyn power of attorney to run the business in his absence. A former president of the Victorian Chamber of Manufactures, he represented Australian employers at the International Labour Conference in Geneva in October 1923. While in London he died of pneumonia and Martyn became managing director of the family business, Steel Company of Australia.

In 1925 Martyn agreed to run as Nationalist Federation candidate for state parliament, but, speaking at a meeting of the Victorian Woman Citizens, made her concerns known:

My soul is my own now, and I am considered honest — I wouldn't be regarded as honest for very long if I did get in. Any woman who enters our Parliament will be faced continually with compromise. I abominate compromise. She will find herself isolated. But she might just as well stand alone in her ideality— this is going to be her greatest contribution to political life — as lend herself to political 'jobbery.' However, if my selection goes forward I shall be willing to pay the price.

— Nellie Martyn, The Herald

She also stated the importance for women politicians being involved in all aspects of law-making, not just relating to the welfare of women and children.

In 1910 Martyn was one of the first women car drivers in Victoria. By 1926 she was known as "not only a skilled driver but also a most cool-headed motorist".

Martyn was actively involved in the Young Women's Christian Association and served as treasurer and later president. At the time of her death she was president of the Professional and Business Women's Club, of which she was a founding member. She was also a long time supporter of the Queen Victoria Hospital.

== Death and legacy ==
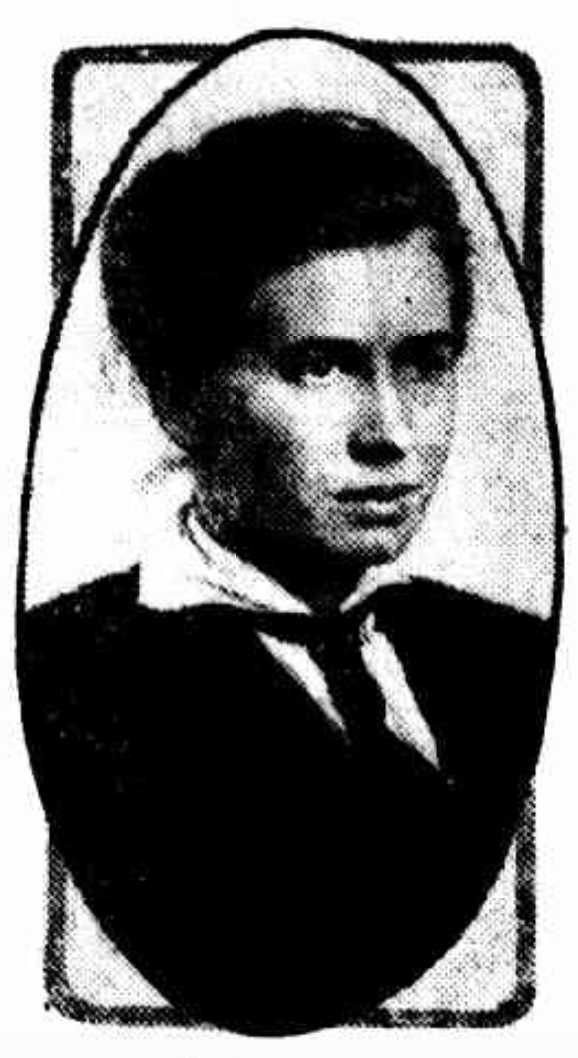
Nellie Constance Martyn

Martyn died of cancer on 28 November 1926 at her home, "Astolat", in Camberwell.

Her funeral at Box Hill Cemetery was attended by some 1,000 business and personal friends, including over 150 of her company's employees. Mourners included Sir William McPherson, later Premier of Victoria, and Essington Lewis, managing director of BHP Steel, as well as committee members of the Young Women's Christian Association. The Argus reported that the "funeral cortege was a mile and a quarter in length, while hundreds of wreaths from business firms in Melbourne were received."

An obituary in The Herald by F.A.R. quoted Sir John Monash, who had led a tour of Yallourn by Melbourne business people some years earlier: "The best man of the whole lot was Miss Martyn".

Her estate was valued at £11,000 for probate which she left to her sister and brothers, with bequests to friends.

Martyn Close, in the Canberra suburb of Chisholm, is named in her honour.
