= Chris Chataway =

Australian priest

The Very Reverend Chris Chataway
- Dean of Perth
- Chris Chataway in 2026
- Church: Anglican Church of Australia
- Province: Province of Western Australia
- Diocese: Diocese of Perth
- Appointed: 1 February 2020
- Predecessor: Richard Pengelley
- Other post: Dean of Ballarat (2014–2020)

Orders
- Ordination: 1985 (as deacon); 1986 (as priest)

Personal details
- Born: 1960 or 1961 (age 65–66)
- Denomination: Anglicanism
- Spouse: Heather
- Children: 4

Chris Chataway (born 1960 or 1961) is an Australian Anglican priest and musician who has served as Dean of Perth since 1 February 2020. He previously served as Archdeacon and Dean of Ballarat from 2014 to 2020.
