= Federal Women's Committee of the Liberal Party of Australia =

Womens wing of the Liberal Party of Australia

The Federal Women's Committee of the Liberal Party of Australia was formed in August 1945 at the inaugural meeting of the party's Federal Council. That year the influential lobby group The Australian Women's National League merged with the Liberal Party, and as a result the Federal Constitution for the Party made specific provisions for the roles women would play in the party. In October 1946, the constitution established the Federal Women's Committee as a structural feature of the Party.

The Liberal Party maintains at a state level the Liberal Women's Councils for the state of Victoria and New South Wales. It is unknown if the other states maintain such state councils in addition to the overarching Federal Women's Committee of the Liberal Party of Australia.

The Federal Women’s Committee (FWC) was established at the inaugural meeting of the Liberal Party Federal Council in August 1945. The FWC was incorporated in the Party Constitution as an official component of the Party in October 1946, and has had representation on the Party’s Federal Executive since that time.

== Membership ==
"The voting membership of the FWC comprises the Chairman of each State and ACT women’s section, the female Federal Vice-President of the Party and the President and Immediate Past President of the FWC. Observer members include the Party’s Federal President, Immediate Past President and the Federal Minister for Women".

"Each State and Territory Division of the Liberal Party has a women’s section, with constituted powers and representation at senior Party levels. The sections have been influential over the years and instrumental in the development of many of the Party’s major initiatives for women at Federal, State and Territory levels".

"As the peak body representing women in the Liberal Party, the FWC has been active in promoting women for elected office, advocating policy, advising on a wide range of issues, assisting in election campaigns and performing a vital role in the enduring success of the Liberal Party. Much of the FWC’s efforts are unsung but they are crucial to the development of a truly representative nationwide party organisation".

== Chairwomen / Presidents ==
- 1945-46: Miss Margaret Battye WA
- 1947: Miss Roberta Gallagher NSW
- 1948: Mrs W. S. Lettice QLD
- 1949: Mrs M. Hodgson VIC
- 1950: Miss Millie Best MBE TAS
- 1951: Mrs (later Lady) Kathleen Sandover OBE JP WA
- 1952: Mrs (later Dame) Marie Breen VIC
- 1953: Mrs (later Lady) Kathleen Sandover OBE JP WA
- 1954: Hon Eileen Furley OBE NSW
- 1955: Mrs (later Lady) Elizabeth Wilson CBE SA
- 1956: Miss Millie Best MBE TAS
- 1957: Mrs (later Dame) Audrey Reader VIC
- 1958: Mrs M. Gordon OBE QLD
- 1959: Mrs (later Hon) Eileen Furley OBE NSW
- 1960: Mrs (later Dame) Mabel Miller TAS
- 1961: Mrs (later Lady) Elizabeth Wilson CBE SA
- 1963-64: Miss Iris Hyde NSW
- 1965: Mrs (later Dame) Mabel Miller TAS
- 1966-67: Mrs V Blogg MBE
- 1967-70: Mrs Noelene Wheeler QLD
- 1970-71: Mrs Margaret Daniel SA
- 1971-72: Mrs Eileen Parr TAS
- 1972-73: Mrs Audrey McKenna WA
- 1973-74: Mrs Yvonne McComb QLD
- 1974-76: Mrs (later Dame) Beryl Beaurepaire VIC
- 1976-77: Mrs Althea McTaggart WA
- 1977-80: Mrs Maureen Giddings NSW
- 1980-85: Mrs Elizabeth Grant AM ACT
- 1985-86: Mrs Cassie Solomon QLD
- 1986-88: Ms (later Hon) Trish Worth (MHR) SA
- 1988-90: Ms Nia Stavropoulos Tilley ACT
- 1990-94: Mrs (later Hon) Joan Hall (MHA) SA
- 1994-97: Mrs Chris McDiven AM NSW
- 1997-99: Ms Penny Reader Harris SA
- 1999-2004: Mrs Deirdre Flint TAS
- 2004-2008: Mrs Theana Thompson VIC
- 2008- : Ms Robyn Nolan WA
