= Henry Mercer (priest) =

Anglican priest and fraudster

Henry Frederick Mercer (30 March 1872 – 22 February 1949) was a British priest in the Church of England who became Dean of Perth, but whose career ended in disgrace when he was convicted and imprisoned on numerous occasions for fraud. He died in Wandsworth Gaol in 1949.

== Early life ==
Mercer was born in 1872 in Barrow-in-Furness, Lancashire, the son of Thomas Atherton Mercer, an accountant, and his wife Mary (née Darricott). He was educated at Giggleswick Grammar School and Christ's College, Cambridge, but only remained there for five terms.

== Clerical career ==
Mercer attended the London College of Divinity, and was ordained deacon in 1895 and priest in 1896. He served curacies at St Mary's, Spital-square, London, 1895–96, St Mary's, North Mimms, 1896–97, and St Cuthbert's, Hampstead, 1897–99. He was then Metropolitan Secretary of the Church Army from 1899 to 1907, during which time he obtained a BA degree from the Western University of London, Ontario. He would later claim to have both a MA and a DLitt. In 1907 he was appointed as Rector of St Columb's Church, Hawthorn, Melbourne, Victoria. He had a focus on men's ministry, and in 1909 established a St Columb's Brotherhood for men of the parish. At this point Mercer was much in favour, and Archbishop Clarke agreed to be the patron.

Mercer's reputation for bringing men back into the church led to the Bishop of Perth, Charles Riley, inviting him to become Dean of Perth in 1912. However, by 1916 doubts about Mercer's character and credentials had emerged, and he had incurred debts of over £A2,000, which were cleared by leading laymen, including Septimus Burt.

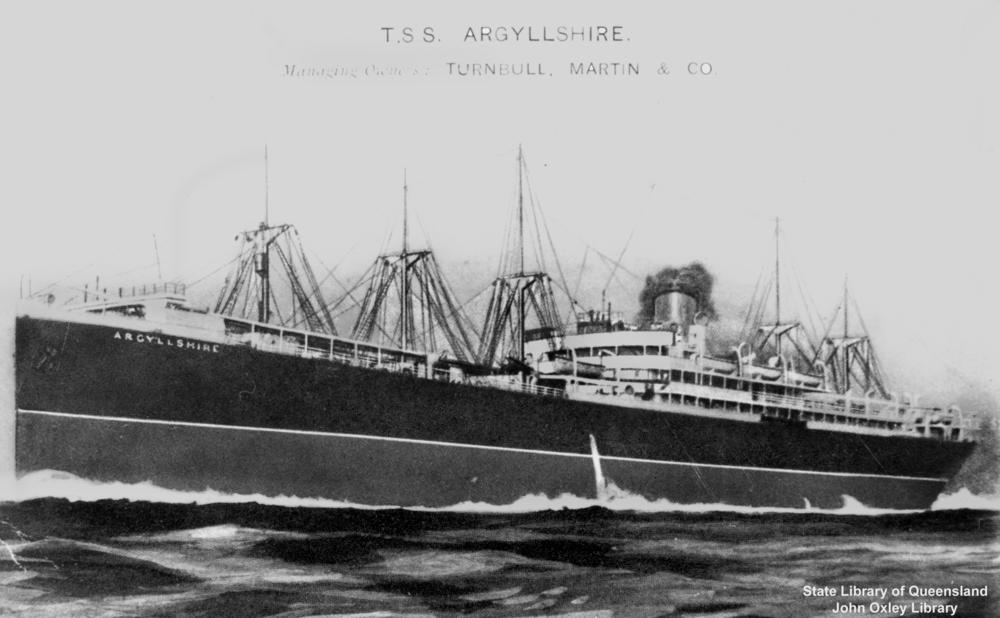
A postcard of Argyllshire

In 1916 he enlisted with the Australian Imperial Force as a Chaplain, 4th Class, and left Fremantle on HMAT Argyllshire. On arrival in England in January 1917, he became chaplain at No 2 Auxiliary Australian Hospital in Southall, London. This was his last clerical role: he resigned as Dean in March. He was deposed from holy orders in 1927.

== Criminal convictions and disgrace ==
Mercer's subsequent career was chequered: he was a temporary Lieutenant in the Royal Naval Volunteer Reserve in 1917, and a Captain in the Royal Air Force in 1918–19. After the War he was appointed to a position as a lecturer at an English university, but which he subsequently lost. By 1921 he was teaching in an English school in Calcutta, styling himself 'Dr H.F. Mercer (late Captain A.I.F.)', neither of which was accurate. At the time of the 1939 register, he was describing himself as 'university examiner & lecturer'.

In 1927 Mercer was sentenced for fraud in Zürich. In 1930 Mercer and Beatrice Carey, who was calling herself Mrs Mercer, were charged in Birmingham with obtaining credit at the British Legion Club in Southport with intent to defraud; Mercer was sentenced to six months' imprisonment with hard labour. This had followed an incident shortly before in Birmingham, when Mercer was charged with having obtained credit by false pretences at the Stork Hotel, but on that occasion the case was dismissed. In 1933 he was sentenced at the Old Bailey to 18 months' imprisonment for false pretences, where he had induced hotelkeepers to give money for advertisements and photographs in guide books that had never appeared.

In 1939 he was sentenced in Rhyl to six months' imprisonment for paying his rent with a false cheque; in court he admitted to other similar offences. In 1946 he was sentenced to a year's imprisonment at East Sussex Quarter Sessions for having obtained £37 from a hotel licensee by false pretences. His last conviction was in 1948 at the Surrey Quarter Sessions, where he was sentenced to 18 months' imprisonment for false pretences and 12 months for obtaining credit by fraud. On that occasion he had paid hotels and tradesmen with worthless cheques. He died in Wandsworth Gaol hospital of pneumonia in 1949, aged 76.

== Personal life ==
Mercer married Eleanor Kate Hill in Bristol in 1896. A daughter, Kathleen, was born in 1897. His first wife died in 1908; the following year in Geelong he married Jean Miller Tannock, whose sister would become the conservative politician, Dame Elizabeth Couchman. His wife and daughter having been left in Perth in 1916, they returned to Melbourne and, in 1919, unsuccessfully applied for a free passage to England. Mercer had deserted his wife by 1925, and she died in Armadale in Melbourne in 1947. Meanwhile, by 1930 he was accompanied by a woman, Florence Beatrice Carey. Mercer referred to her as his wife (although there is no evidence of a divorce from Jean Mercer), and she is recorded as such in the 1939 register. She died in 1952, and her death was registered under both surnames. The daughter married twice and died in 1973.
