= Australian Women's National League =

The Australian Women's National League (AWNL) was an Australian political lobby group federation first established in 1904. It acted in many ways like a political party, with an extensive branch network and the capability to run its own candidates. It was a conservative organisation with four key declared objectives:

- Loyalty to the Throne;
- To counteract Socialist tendencies;
- To educate the Women of Victoria to realise their political responsibilities; and
- To Safeguard the Interests of the Home, Women and Children.

== Foundation ==
The AWNL was supported in its foundation by the Victorian Employers' Federation and by employer bodies in other states, but it quickly became independent from those male-dominated groups, and formed an anti-socialist alliance with the Farmer's League in 1905. The group aimed to espouse anti-socialist ideas to Australian women who had been given the right to vote in Australian federal elections in 1902.

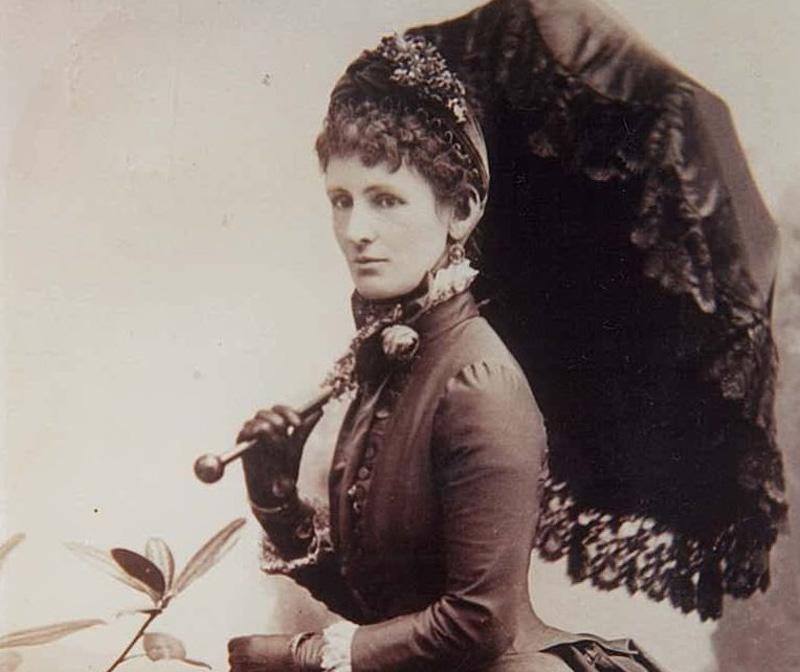
Lady Clarke, who played a key role in establishing the organisation.

Leading Melbourne establishment figure, Janet, Lady Clarke, held a meeting at her home in August 1903 to discuss the formation of such a conservative women's movement. Months later, in March 1904, Lady Clarke's sister, Eva Hughes, organised a meeting at the Melbourne Town Hall. It chose a provisional committee and elected Lady Clarke as its inaugural president.

On 25 October 1907, the League conducted the first Pan-Australian Conference of Anti-Socialist Women's Organisations. The League played an important role in achieving women's suffrage (right to vote) throughout Australia. By 1908, it had 10,000 members in Victoria alone, and helped convince the male conservative members of parliament that women voters would not necessarily be left-wing in disposition. In 1909, Lady Clarke died and was succeeded as president by her sister Eva who stayed in charge until 1922.

In 1912, the Liberal prime minister Alfred Deakin described the lobby group as "fierce and unceasing" in their political demands. He continued "So far – singlehanded – I have beat them and kept them at bay, but how long can this last?"

The ANWL was a very active organisation, with many suburban and rural branches. It published a monthly journal The Woman. It ran many campaigns, including one for greater education in "domestic science". The League organised Empire Day festivities in Melbourne for forty years and, during World War I, organised thousands of women to contribute to the war effort. In 1918, it launched "Baby Week" as an education campaign for families. It also conducted political education and training courses for its members, to make them more effective campaigners.

== Peak of power ==
At its peak in World War I, the AWNL had 500 registered branches and more than 54,000 members across Australia. Using its massive membership base as a platform for achieving its objectives, it was very active in electoral politics, initially supporting male candidates and forming an important part of conservative political efforts across Australia. They employed women as paid political organisers, raised large amounts of money, and actively supported candidates, who sometimes had to go through a preselection process to attract the League's support.

Some years after women had obtained the right to vote and to run for office, most of the first women candidates in Western Australia, New South Wales, Queensland and Victoria were members of the League. While they generally worked with conservative political parties, on occasion they did not. In one instance, when one of their favoured candidates in Queensland was not endorsed as they had demanded, they ran their own candidate, Irene Longman, who became the first female member of the Legislative Assembly of Queensland in 1929.

Actions such as these, the vast size of the League, and its highly skilled political operatives, made it one of the most effective and feared political organisations in Australian politics at the time. Male journalists complained at the time about the power of the group: "Political godmothers rule UAP (United Australia Party) with haughty mien ... the political fate of the electorate was controlled by women."

== Merger with the Liberals ==
In 1944, the AWNL actively supported the newly created Liberal Party of Australia and merged with it in 1945. The League's leaders at the time – including Dame Elizabeth Couchman and future senator Ivy Wedgwood – negotiated a tough deal with Sir Robert Menzies which ensured that women were equally represented throughout the structures of the Liberal Party, long before the era of affirmative action. It was agreed that the Liberal Party would reserve certain positions for women, that there would be a Woman Vice-president of the party, and also a Federal Women's Committee, the president of which would also sit on the party's Federal Executive.

Menzies regarded Couchman very highly and observed: "She would have been the best cabinet minister I could have wished for".

Some argue that the League had a major impact on the Liberal Party's direction leading up to the election in 1949, which the party won convincingly. In a highly unusual move at the time, Liberal advertising specifically made reference to women and women's issues. Images of men and women (and in some cases of women alone) were used in political advertising for the first time on a major scale. Their opponents in the Australian Labor Party were largely silent on women's issues.

Although the organisation had formally resolved to merge with the Liberal Party, some preferred to retain an autonomous group, which continued for a time with considerably reduced members and activity.

In 2004, the Prime Minister of Australia, John Howard, spoke at a function commemorating the 100th anniversary of the foundation of the League, and paid tribute to its important role in the history of the Liberal Party and Australia.

== Notable members ==
- Jessie Ackermann – social reformer
- Marie Breen – Senator for Victoria (1962–1968)
- Janet Clarke – philanthropist, inaugural AWNL President
- Elizabeth Couchman – AWNL President (1927–1945)
- Eleanor Glencross – activist
- Eva Hughes – political organiser
- Enid Lyons – wife of Prime Minister Joseph Lyons, first woman elected to the House of Representatives (1943–1951)
- Nellie Constance Martyn (1887–1926) Australian businesswoman, managing director of Steel Company of Australia
- May Moss – AWNL Vice-president (1906–1914), National Council of Women President (1931–1936)
- Ivy Wedgwood – Senator for Victoria (1950–1971)
