= Ivy Wedgwood =

Australian politician

Dame Ivy Wedgwood DBE
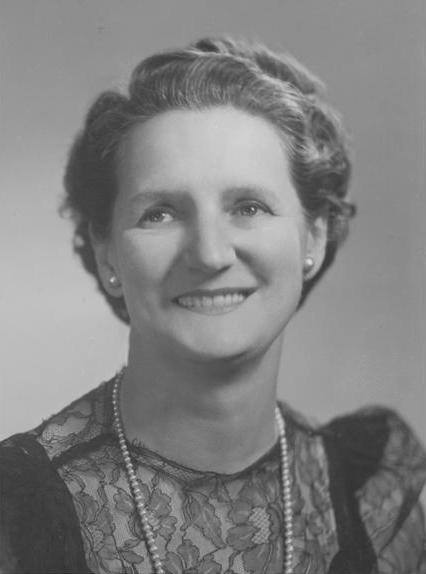

Senator for Victoria
- In office 22 February 1950 – 30 June 1971

Personal details
- Born: Ivy Evelyn Annie Drury; 18 October 1896 Malvern, Victoria, Australia
- Died: 24 July 1975 (aged 78) Toorak, Victoria, Australia
- Party: Liberal
- Other political affiliations: AWNL
- Spouse: Jack Wedgwood (m. 1921)

Dame Ivy Evelyn Annie Wedgwood, DBE (née Drury; 18 October 1896 – 24 July 1975) was an Australian politician who served as a Senator for Victoria from 1950 to 1971, representing the Liberal Party. She was the first woman to represent Victoria in the Senate and the first woman to chair a select committee.

== Early life ==
Ivy Evelyn Annie Drury was born in Melbourne, the older of two daughters born to Elizabeth (née Evans) and Albert Drury; her father worked as a dairyman. She grew up in the suburb of Flemington, attending the local state school. After leaving school, she worked as a secretary for Paterson, Laing and Bruce, a clothing company. Her manager there was Stanley Bruce, a future Prime Minister of Australia. She later worked as an accountant for H. P. Launder, an import firm, and as a saleswoman for Myer, a department store. On 7 October 1921, she married Jack Kearns Wedgwood, a mechanic and ex-serviceman who became an executive at Holden. They initially settled in Woodend, but later moved to Essendon.

== Politics ==
=== Early involvement ===
Wedgwood joined the Australian Women's National League (AWNL) in the 1920s, and eventually won election to its federal executive. One of her political mentors was Elizabeth Couchman, the organisation's president. In 1944, Wedgwood and Couchman were among those who represented the AWNL at the two conferences which led to the creation of the Liberal Party of Australia. The league eventually resolved to merge into the new party, but only after securing a number of concessions towards female representation. In Victoria, half of the positions in the party's organisational wing were reserved for women. Wedgwood became a prominent figure in the early years of the Victorian Liberal Party, initially as a member of various committees and later as a party vice-president and head of its women's section. She also represented Victoria on the Federal Executive and as a delegate to the Federal Council.

=== Senator for Victoria ===
Wedgwood was elected to the Senate at the 1949 federal election. She was one of ten female candidates, but only she and Agnes Robertson of Western Australia were successful. Their election brought the total number of women in the Senate to four (out of 60), the others being Dorothy Tangney and Annabelle Rankin. Wedgwood's first term began on 22 February 1950. She was re-elected in 1951, 1953, 1958, and 1964. Wedgwood was the first woman to represent Victoria in the Senate and remains Victoria's longest-serving female parliamentarian; only six other women have served in the Senate for more than 20 years.

In the Senate, Wedgwood was a prominent advocate for women's interests. According to her successor, Margaret Guilfoyle, she "felt that she was there to represent their values and their views". Wedgwood and her colleagues successfully lobbied for the removal of the marriage bar in the Commonwealth Public Service, and she was a driving force behind the creation of the women's bureau in the Department of Labour and National Service, which monitored trends in women's employment. She frequently raised the issue of equal pay for equal work, and pressed for the appointment of more women to the boards of government agencies and state-run enterprises. Wedgwood was the first married woman to serve in parliament (her colleagues all being either unmarried or widowed), and the media made frequent references to her domestic arrangements – one newspaper reported her retirement with the headline "Ivy is a housewife again". She attempted to secure benefits for her husband equal to those given to the wives of male MPs, but was unsuccessful. (Note: Wedgwood first raised the issue in 1959, but the relevant legislation – the Parliamentary Retiring Allowance Act 1948 – was not amended until 1973, several years after she left parliament. By that time, several more married women had entered parliament.)

According to Malcolm Fraser, Wedgwood was at her most influential behind the scenes, both in parliament and within the Liberal Party. She once quipped that her autobiography should be titled Men I Have Had Breakfast With. She supported John Gorton's candidacy for the party leadership in 1968, but her initial enthusiasm was replaced by "distrust and disillusionment", and she was later part of the group that worked to replace him with William McMahon. Wedgwood was also prominent in Senate committees, most notably as a member of the Joint Committee of Public Accounts from 1955 until her retirement; she was its sole female member during that time. In 1968, she was appointed chair of the Select Committee on Medical and Hospital Costs, making her the first woman to chair a select committee. She later chaired the Standing Committee on Health and Welfare, overseeing the publication of a landmark report into disability issues.

Wedgwood's final term in the Senate expired on 30 June 1971. Noting her retirement, The Herald described her as "one of the shrewdest minds in Canberra over the last two decades", but said that she was "comparatively unknown to the general public because she never grandstanded". In 1974, Wedgwood was in attendance at the launch of the National Liberal Party, a right-wing splinter group founded by her former colleague George Hannan. However, it is unclear if she supported the new party or was merely an observer.

== Community work and later life ==
Wedgwood was made a special magistrate of the Children's Court of Victoria in 1945, and the following year was nominated as a justice of the peace. She served on the state executive of the National Council of Women, and spent periods as president of the Australian Council of Domiciliary Nursing and the Women Justices' Association of Victoria. She was also a long-serving honorary treasurer of the Royal District Nursing Service (RDNS), and in retirement served as president of the After-Care Hospital, the organisation's hospice on Victoria Parade. Wedgwood was created a Dame Commander of the Order of the British Empire (DBE) in the 1967 Birthday Honours, for "distinguished services to parliament and the community". She died at her Toorak apartment on 24 July 1975, aged 78.

== See also ==
- Women in the Australian Senate
