= Robert Moore (priest) =

Robert Henry Moore (8 June 1872 - 20 February 1964) was an Anglican priest in the last decade of the 19th century and the first three of the 20th.

Moore was educated at Trinity College, Dublin and ordained in 1897. After a curacy at St Luke's, Lower Falls, Belfast he went out to Australia. He served at Kanowna, Mount Morgans, Boulder and Fremantle. During World War I he served as a Chaplain in the AIF. When peace returned he became the Rector of Northam. He was also Archdeacon of Northam from 1921 until 1930; and the Dean of Perth from 1929 to 1947.

He died in 1964, aged 91. He was married twice: first in 1901 to Jane Josephine Watterson, who died in 1916, and, secondly, in 1921 to Margaret Riley, the daughter of the Archbishop of Perth, Charles Riley.
