= Linda White (politician) =

Australian politician (1959/1960 – 2024)

Senator Linda White
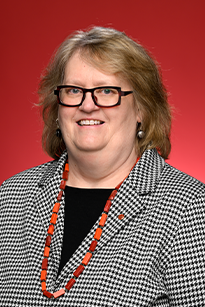

Senator for Victoria
- In office 1 July 2022 – 29 February 2024
- Preceded by: Kim Carr
- Succeeded by: Lisa Darmanin

Personal details
- Born: 1959/1960
- Died: 29 February 2024 (aged 64)
- Party: Labor
- Education: University of Melbourne
- Occupation: Solicitor

Linda White (1959/1960 – 29 February 2024) was an Australian politician. She was a member of the Australian Labor Party (ALP) and was elected to the Senate as the party's lead candidate in Victoria at the 2022 federal election, to a term beginning on 1 July 2022. She was a lawyer and trade unionist before entering politics, including serving as the assistant national secretary of the Australian Services Union (ASU) from 1995 till 2020.

== Early life ==
White studied law and commerce at the University of Melbourne.

== Career ==
White worked as a solicitor for ten years before joining the Australian Services Union (ASU). She served as assistant national secretary with responsibility for "the union's national strategy in the private sector including the airline industry, IT and call centre industries and the non-government social and community services (SACS) sector".

In 1993, White became a director of the Victorian Legal Industry Superannuation Scheme, which later merged into LegalSuper. She has also served as a director of the Royal Botanic Gardens Victoria and the Australian Centre for the Moving Image and Statewide Super from 2019 to 2022.

== Politics ==
White was elected to the Australian Labor Party National Executive in 2006. She was appointed to the board of the Chifley Research Centre, the party's think tank, in 2013 and became chair in 2015. She was a prominent organisational power broker from Labor Left, representing the Victorian Socialist Left Faction.

In March 2022, White won ALP preselection as the party's lead Senate candidate in Victoria at the 2022 federal election and was elected to a term commencing on 1 July 2022. She replaced one of her political rivals, Senator Kim Carr, on the ticket after his retirement. She received the support of the United Workers Union, the Australian Services Union, and grassroots members of the Socialist Left in her preselection contest against Josh Bornstein and Ryan Batchelor.

== Death ==
In February 2024, White took leave from parliamentary work to deal with major health issues. She died in office on 29 February 2024. Prime Minister Anthony Albanese announced her death and paid tribute to Senator White. He had visited her in hospital.

Parliament of Australia
Preceded by Kim Carr	Senator for Victoria; 2022–2024	Succeeded by Lisa Darmanin (designate)
