= Richard Pengelley =

Australian water polo player (born 1960)

Personal information
- Born: August 21, 1960 (age 64); Perth, Western Australia, Australia

Sport
- Sport: Water polo

Richard Pengelley (born 21 August 1960) is an Australian former water polo player who competed in the 1984 Summer Olympics and in the 1988 Summer Olympics.

An Anglican Priest, Pengelley is the former Dean of Perth.

Pengelley is currently the chaplain of St Mary's Anglican Girls' School.
