= St George's Cathedral, Perth =

Church in Perth, Western Australia

- Cathedral Church of St George
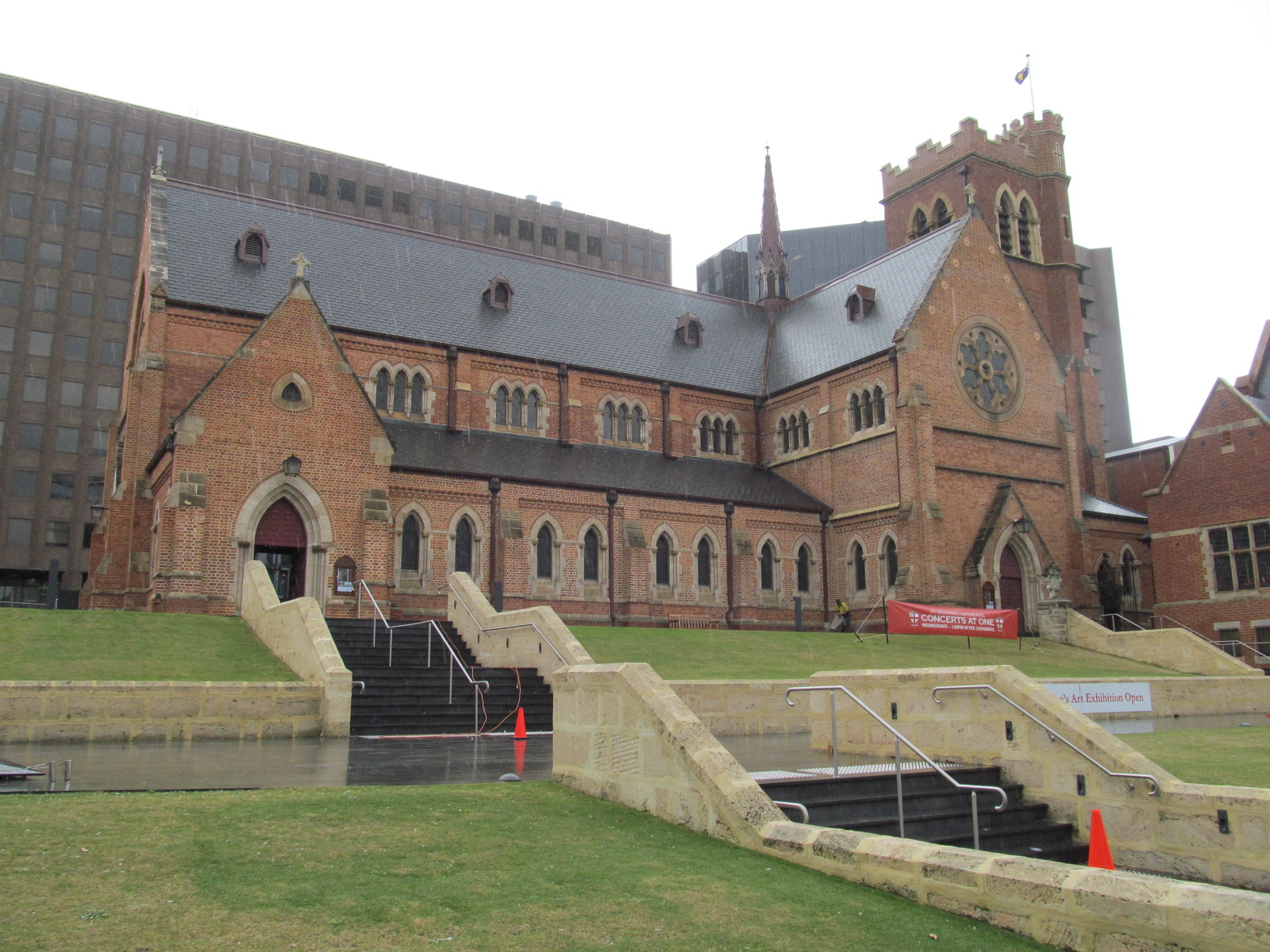
- St George's Cathedral southern side
- St George's Cathedral, Perth
- 31°57′21″S 115°51′41″E
- Location: Perth, Western Australia
- Address: 38 St Georges Terrace, Perth WA 6000
- Country: Australia
- Denomination: Anglican Church of Australia
- Website: perthcathedral.org

History
- Status: Cathedral
- Dedication: Saint George
- Dedicated: 1888

Architecture
- Functional status: Active
- Architects: Edmund Blacket; Edmund & Cyril Blackett; J Talbot Hobbs (1902); Charles Oldham, Harold Boas, Ednie Brown; George Herbert Parry (1914)
- Architectural type: Cathedral
- Style: Victorian Academic
- Years built: 1879 – 1888

Specifications
- Materials: Locally-made brick; Limestone from Rottnest Island; Western Australian jarrah

Administration
- Province: Western Australia
- Diocese: Perth
- Parish: Perth Cathedral

Clergy
- Archbishop: Kay Goldsworthy
- Dean: Chris Chataway

Western Australia Heritage Register
- Official name: St George's Cathedral
- Type: Built
- Criteria: 11.1., 11.2., 11.4., 12.1., 12.2., 12.3, 12.4., 12.5.
- Designated: 20 October 1995
- Reference no.: 2102

St George's Cathedral is the principal Anglican church in the city of Perth, Western Australia, and the mother-church of the Anglican Diocese of Perth. It is located on St Georges Terrace in the centre of the city.

On 26 June 2001 the cathedral was listed on the Western Australia Heritage Register with the following statement of significance:

The cathedral is a fine example of Victorian Academic Gothic architecture, designed by noted Australian architect Edmund Blacket; occupying a strategic position at the corner of Saint Georges Terrace and Cathedral Avenue, the cathedral is a major element within the Central Government Precinct, and makes a major contribution to the streetscape of central Perth; as the cathedral of the See of the Anglican Archbishop of Perth, the place is held in high regard by the members of the Anglican Church and the general community; and, the building is closely associated with the establishment and growth of the State through its role as the premier place of worship for the Crown.

— Statement of significance, Western Australia Heritage Register

== History ==
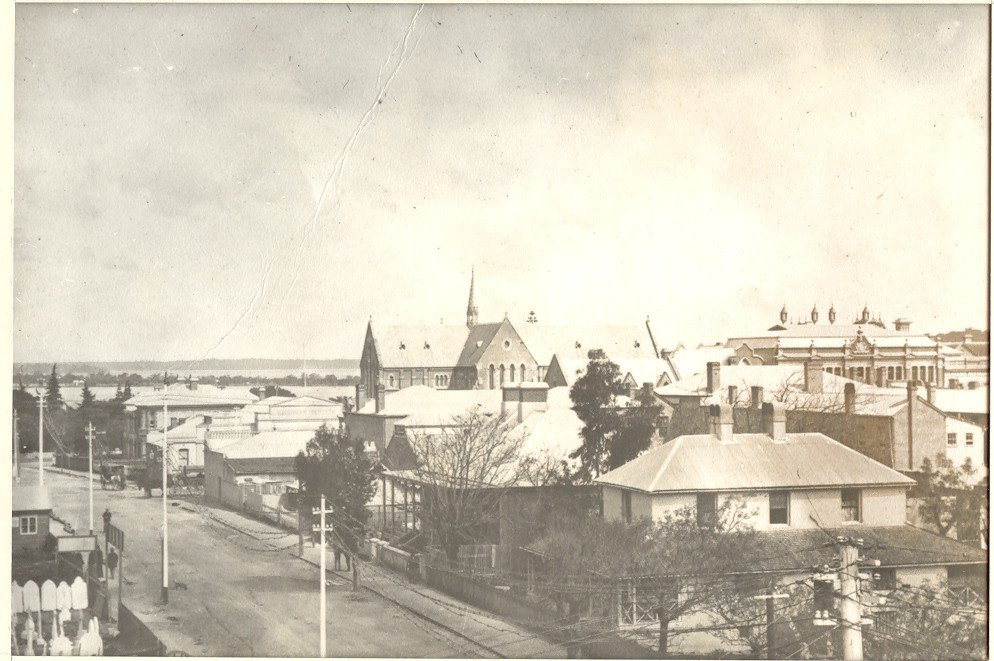
St George's Cathedral in Perth, from the corner of Irwin and Murray Streets, circa 1890

Built between 1879 and 1888 the cathedral was situated at the corner of St Georges Terrace and Cathedral Avenue at the heart of Perth's heritage precinct, which includes the nearby Treasury Buildings and the town hall. It replaced an earlier building immediately to the north-east of the present one. The cathedral is described in the Western Australian State Heritage Register as being a church in the Victorian Academic style, built of locally made brick, limestone from Rottnest Island and Western Australian jarrah. The pitched roof was originally covered with slates; these were replaced by tiles in the 1950s because the original roof leaked, and returned to slate in the restoration works in the early 2000s as the tiles were too heavy causing the roof to bow. A central nave, with a timber vaulted roof supported by hammerbeams, has an aisle on each side and a rose window dominating its western end. The rose-coloured brick interior of the cathedral is simple but elegant. The State Heritage Register assessment describes the intersecting beams over the crossing as "impressive in their lightness and grace" and providing a "subdued but elegant decoration to the building". The present cathedral was designed by Sydney architect Edmund Blacket, the pre-eminent architect of his age in New South Wales.

The site is near the "Rush Church", the first church built in Perth by Frederick Irwin, in December 1829, a few months after the city was founded.

From 2005 to 2008 the cathedral was extensively restored with the tile roof replaced by slates as originally built. Earthquake protection was added to two walls to provide bracing and much other work was undertaken.

St George's Cathedral has become noted for its innovative and controversial theological teaching, popular preaching, commitment to inter-faith worship and music.

The cathedral is listed on the permanent register of the Western Australia Heritage Register, is classified by the National Trust WA and is entered into the (now defunct) Register of the National Estate.

In 2018, Kay Goldsworthy became the world's first female Anglican archbishop in Perth. Her installation service was held at St George's Cathedral. She had become a bishop in St George's Cathedral in 2008.

== Features ==
=== Bells ===
The cathedral has a peal of eight bells set for change ringing and rung by the St George's Cathedral Bellringers' Association, affiliated with the Australian and New Zealand Association of Bellringers.

Upon hearing of Queen Victoria's death in 1901 the Perth community created an appeal to fund the creation of the Queen Victoria Memorial Bell Tower at the cathedral. The square castellated bell tower was designed by the Western Australian architect Talbot Hobbs. The red-and-white flag of Saint George is flown daily from the top of the bell tower. The bells were cast by John Warner & Sons of London and installed on the second anniversary of Victoria's death. However, the bells were only rung infrequently for the subsequent decades due to a combination of the lack of proficient ringers and for structural concerns in the tower itself. The bells were regularly rung every Sunday (but not tolled) up until the 1970s.

The castellated bell tower was damaged in the 1968 Meckering earthquake. All ringing in the tower was ceased after tower bricks were dislodged due to service ringing in July 1973. Following a restoration appeal the cathedral had its original peal recast by John Taylor & Co in 1975 and hung a year later in a cast-iron and steel frame with the new tenor at 560 kilograms (1,200 lb). The original tenor of 910 kilograms (2,000 lb) was kept as a service bell. The bellringing band became active again and achieved 25 peals by the end of the 20th century.

=== Organs ===
==== West organ ====
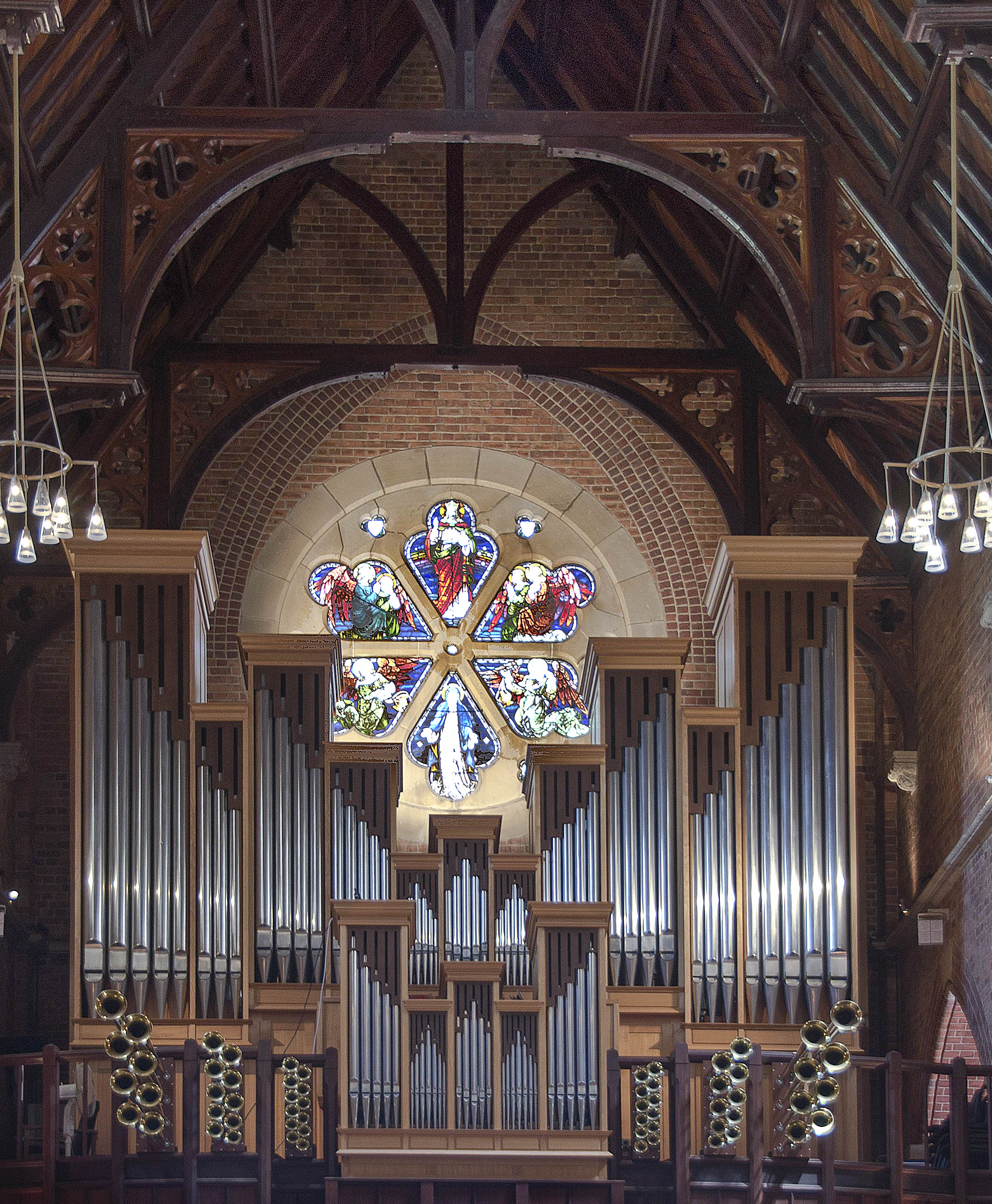
The west organ

The west organ was installed in 1993 and dedicated on Advent Sunday. It is placed on a specially constructed gallery at the west end of the cathedral. The organ and gallery together form a feature complementing the architecture of the nave and chancel.

The organ is the largest mechanical-action instrument to be installed in Western Australia since the similarly sized Ronald Sharp organ in the Perth Concert Hall was completed in 1974. The casework is made of Tasmanian oak and the front pipes are of burnished tin. The organ has 4 divisions, 48 speaking stops and 3516 pipes. Tonal revisions and refinements were carried out in 2008/09 by the South Island Organ Company (SIOC) of Timaru, New Zealand. This included lengthening the resonators of the chorus reeds to provide a more fundamental tone quality and a thorough cleaning and regulation of the flue pipes to improve the overall quality and cohesion of the sound.

In 2010, SIOC installed the 32’ bombarde stop. This enhancement is dedicated to the memory of twelve former cathedral choristers who died on active service during the Great War. A notable feature of the west organ was the addition, also by SIOC, of a solo and horizontal fanfare trumpet, voiced in the French symphonic school. Named in honour of Geoffrey Gates AM, the fanfare trumpet was blessed at Evensong on 1 May 2011.

==== Chancel organ ====
In 1994 a new chancel organ was installed in the chamber under the bell tower. Consisting of 18 stops in 3 divisions, with mechanical key and electric stop action, this small organ is designed to accompany choirs singing in the chancel. Electric over-ride enables both the chancel organ and the west organ to be played simultaneously from a third and free-standing console.

==== Chamber organ ====
This instrument was built in 1987 and can be placed anywhere in the cathedral to serve as a continuo instrument. Its five ranks of pipes are enclosed in a swell box and played from a single manual. The organ has four speaking stops, no pedals and a transposer allowing it to be pitched at either standard pitch of A440 or at A415 for authentic performance of early music.

=== Ascalon ===
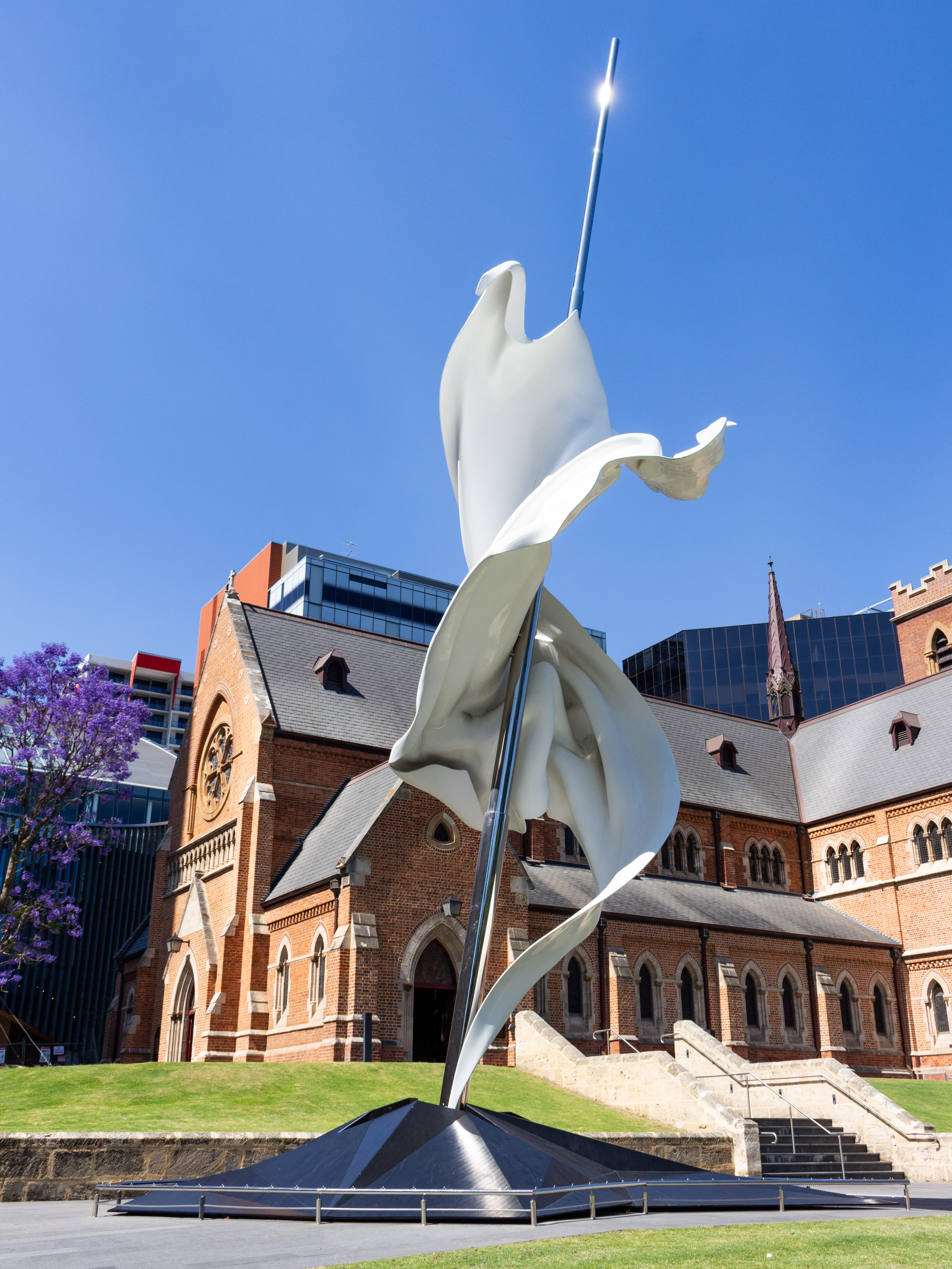
Ascalon, an abstract sculpture depicting the story of St George and the dragon

On 15 June 2009, after a 12-month submission and selection process, the chapter of St George's Cathedral commissioned Marcus Canning and Christian de Vietri to create a contemporary sculpture on the theme of St George and the Dragon for the cathedral grounds.

Named "Ascalon" after the lance used by St George to slay the dragon, the artwork aims “to evoke a sense of righteous power and victory over a force of darkness and oppression”.

The blessing of Ascalon took place on 3 April 2011.

== Precinct ==
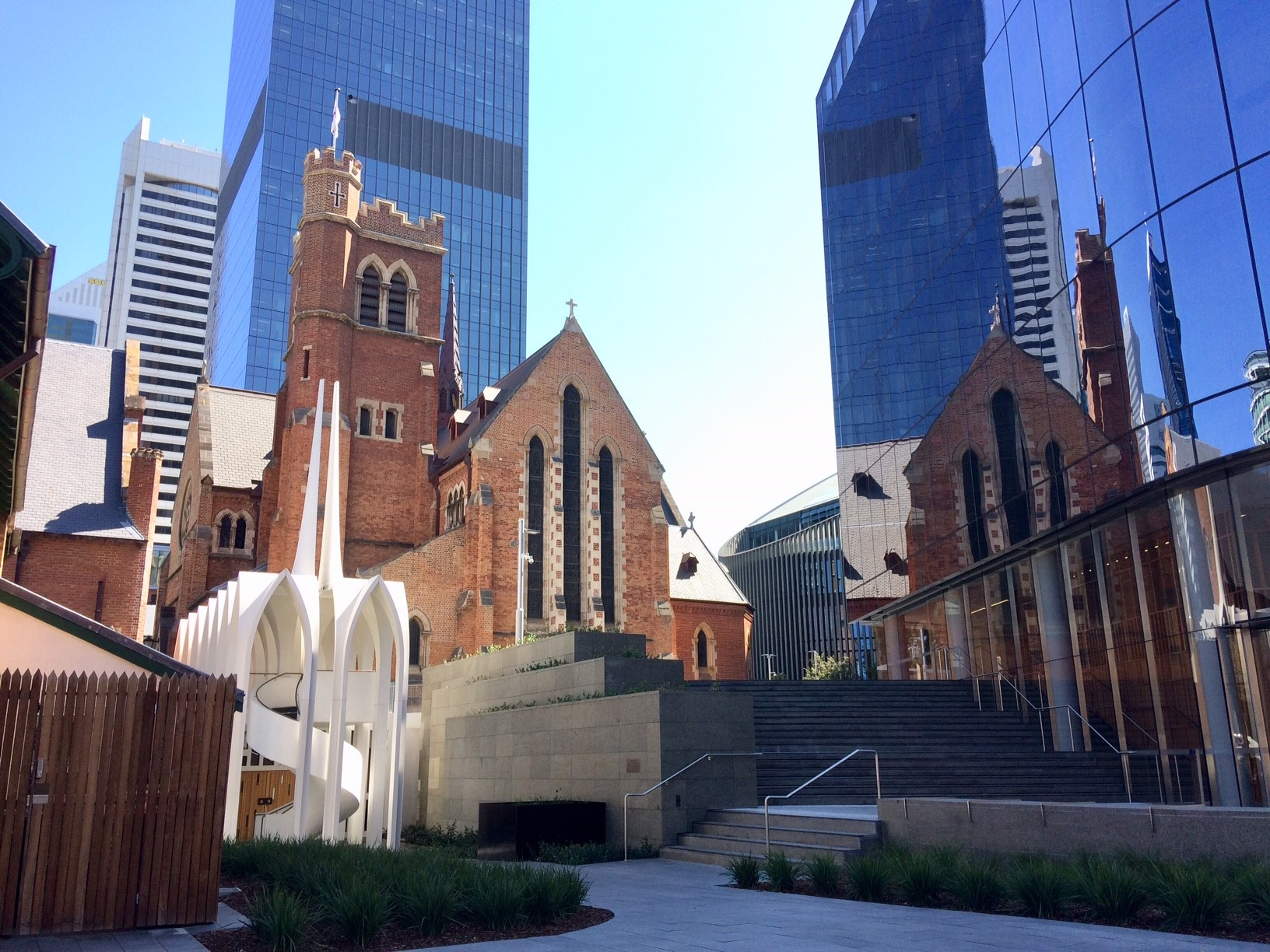
Cadogan Song School and Cathedral Square

The Deanery, which adjoins the cathedral on the corner of Pier Street, was built in 1859. The deanery gardens were completed in October 2017 and is the final link to the Cathedral Precinct.

The Burt Memorial Hall was completed in 1918.

The Cadogan Song School was built between February 2016 and August 2017 and is located between the cathedral and the hall, and to the west of the deanery. The building serves as a home to the St George's Cathedral Choir and Consort.

== Deans ==
The following individuals have served as deans of Perth:

Ordinal	Name	Term start	Term end	Time in office	Notes
1	George Purvis Pownall	1858	1863	4–5 years	
2	James Brown	1864	1873	8–9 years	Never installed as Dean
3	Joseph Gegg	1875	1887	11–12 years	
4	Frederick Goldsmith	1888	1904	15–16 years	
5	Henry Guy Dampier Latham	1906	1911	4–5 years	
6	Henry Frederick Mercer	1912	1917	4–5 years	
7	Ernest Foster	1918	1925	6–7 years	
8	Robert Henry Moore	1929	1947	17–18 years	
9	Geoffrey Thomas Berwick	1947	1953	5–6 years	
10	John Bell	1953	1958	4–5 years	
11	Brian Macdonald	1959	1961	1–2 years	
12	James Payne	1962	1968	5–6 years	
13	John Hazlewood	1968	1975	6–7 years	
14	Vernon Cornish	1976	1979	2–3 years	
15	David Robarts	1979	1989	9–10 years	
16	John Shepherd	1990	2014	23–24 years	
17	Richard Pengelley	2015	2019	3–4 years	
18	Chris Chataway	2020	incumbent	5–6 years	

== Gallery ==
St George's Cathedral images

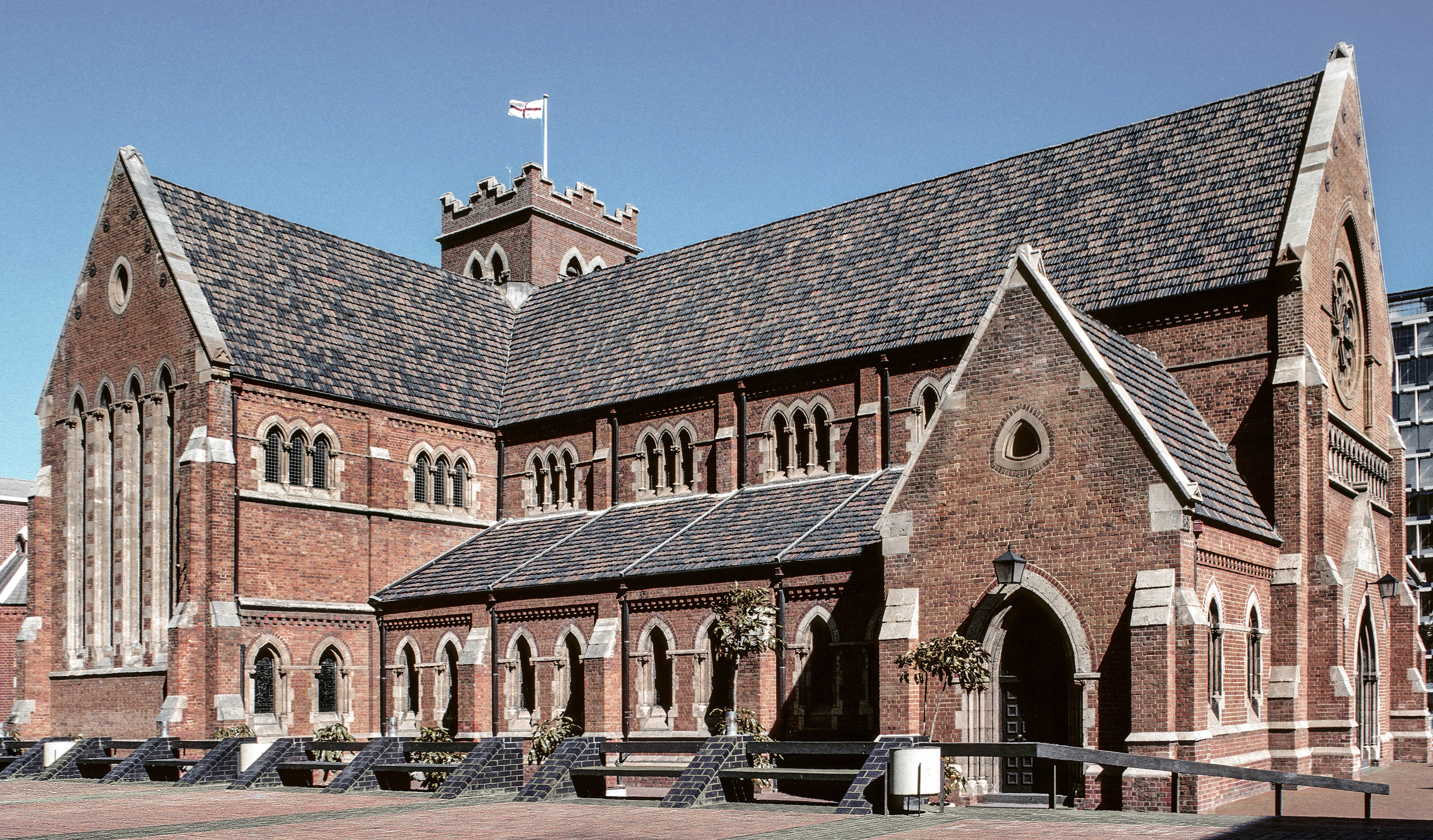
View from the north west

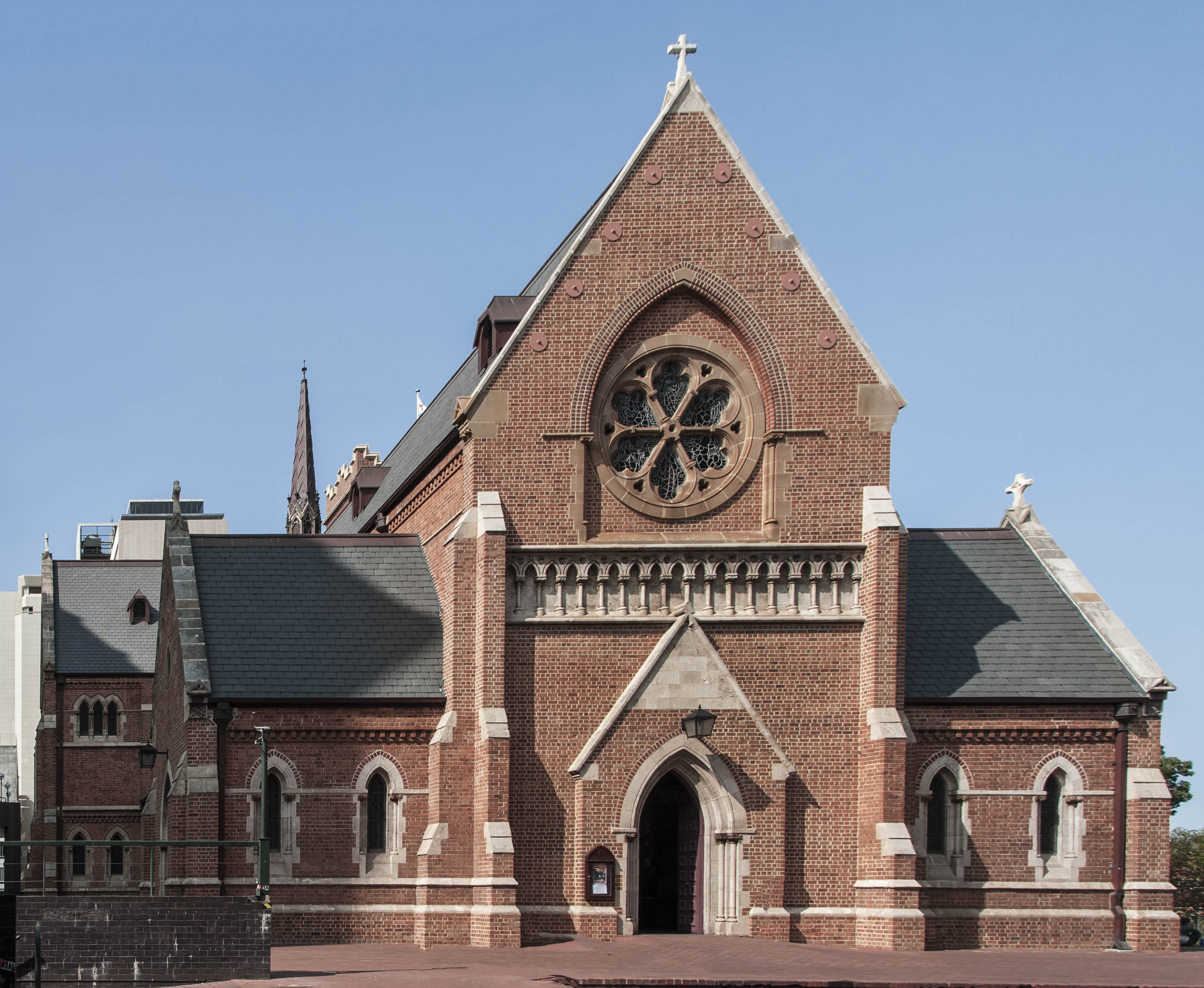
West front

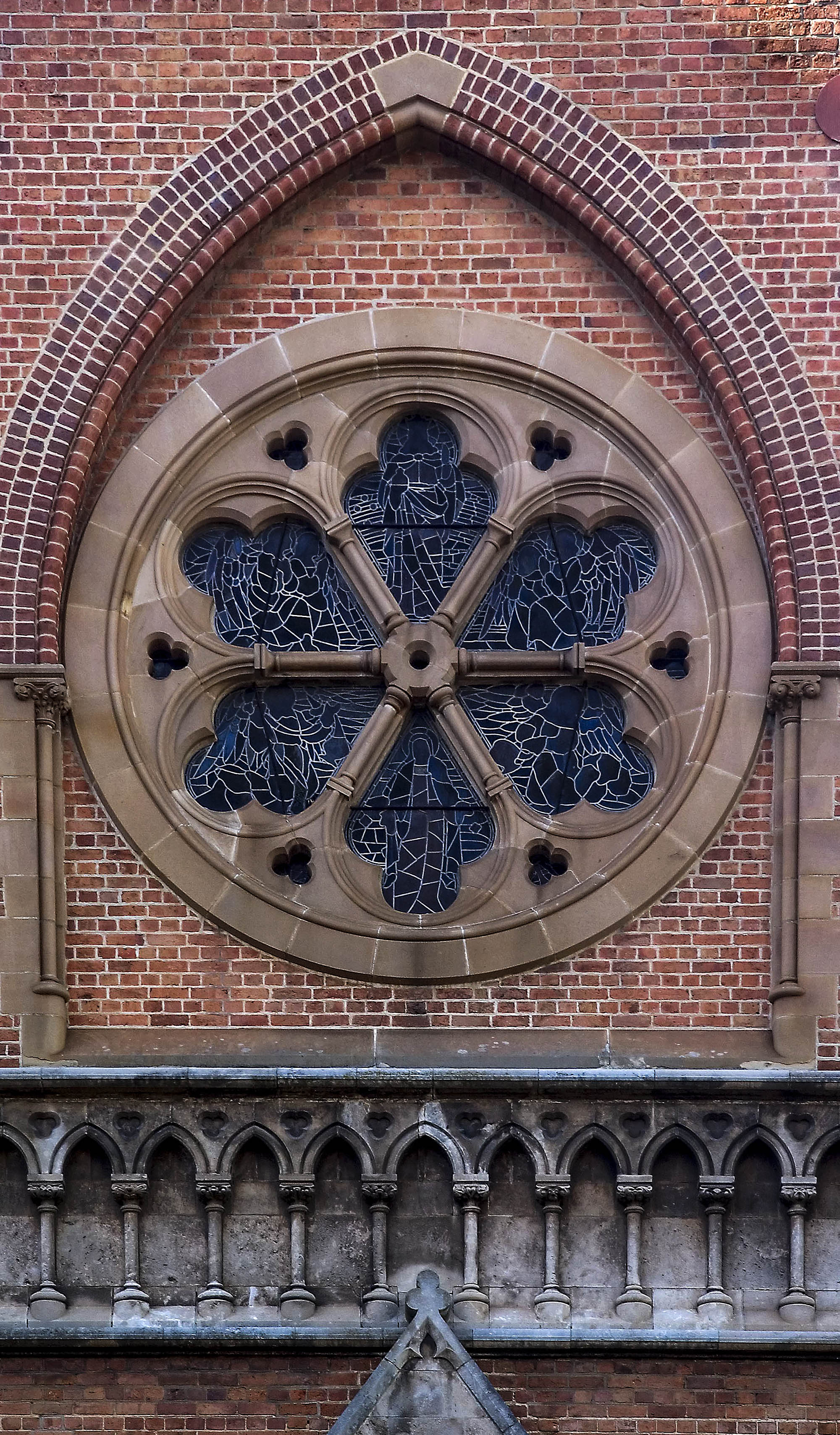
Rose window

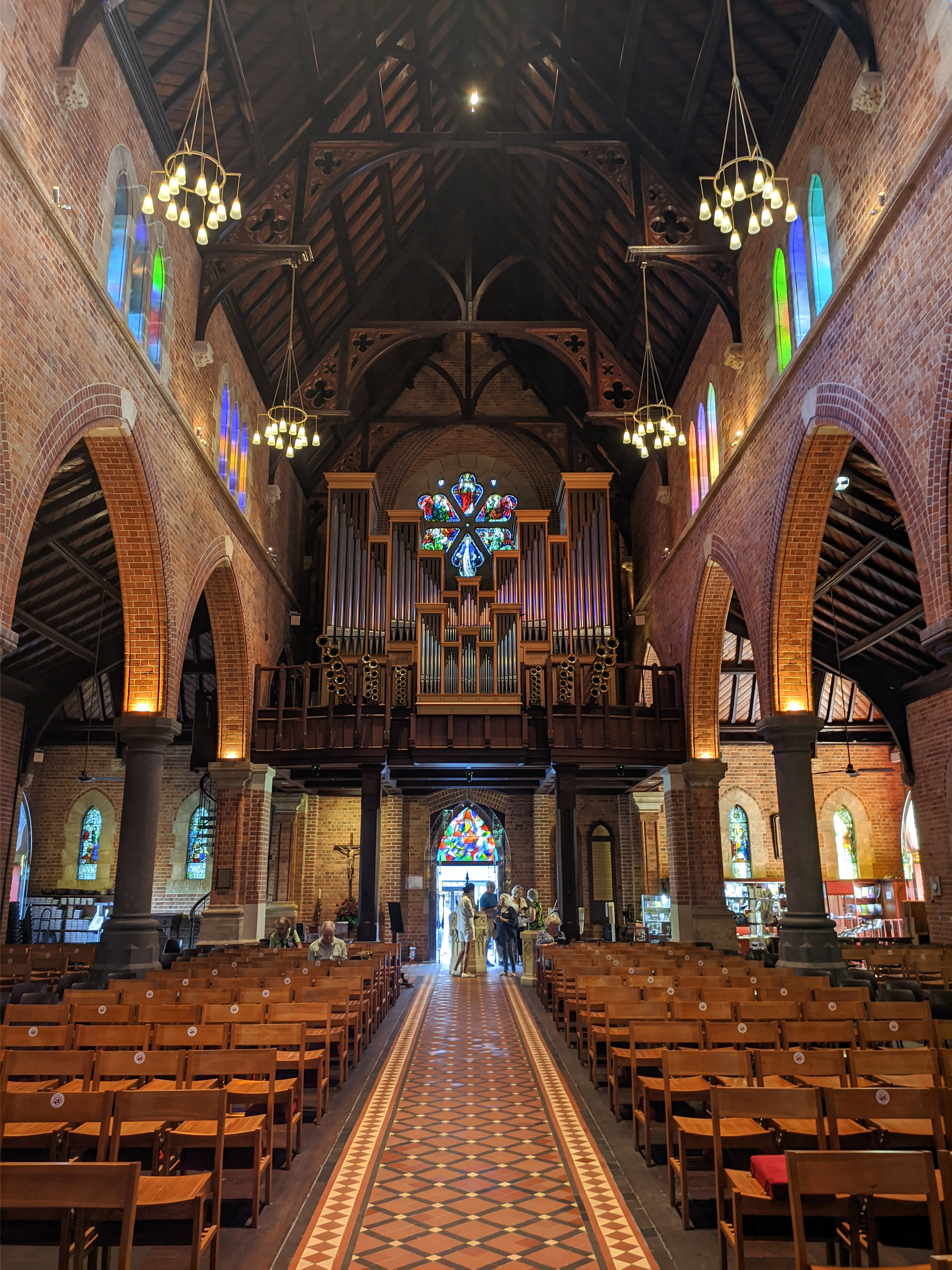
Interior facing west

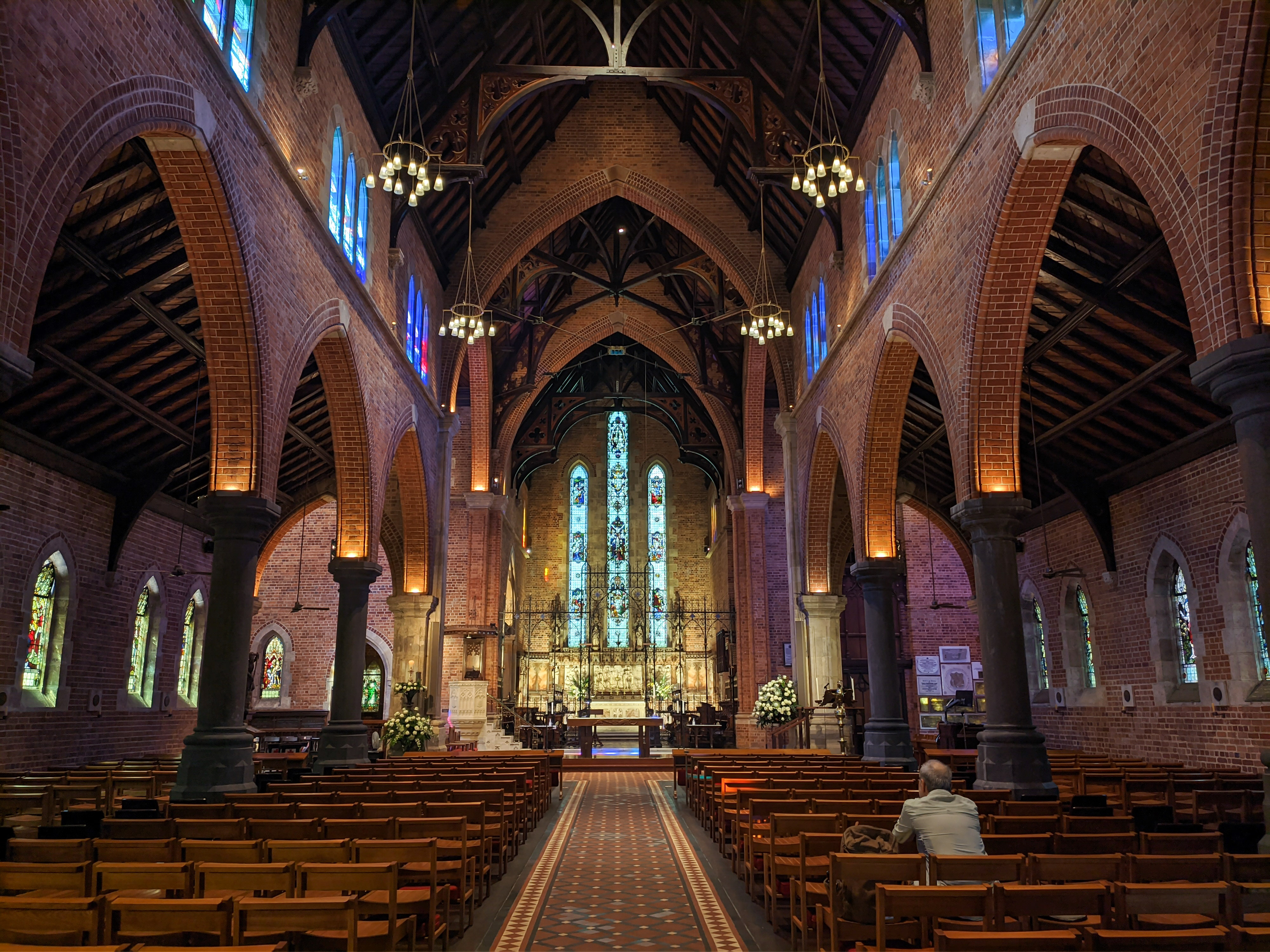
Interior facing east

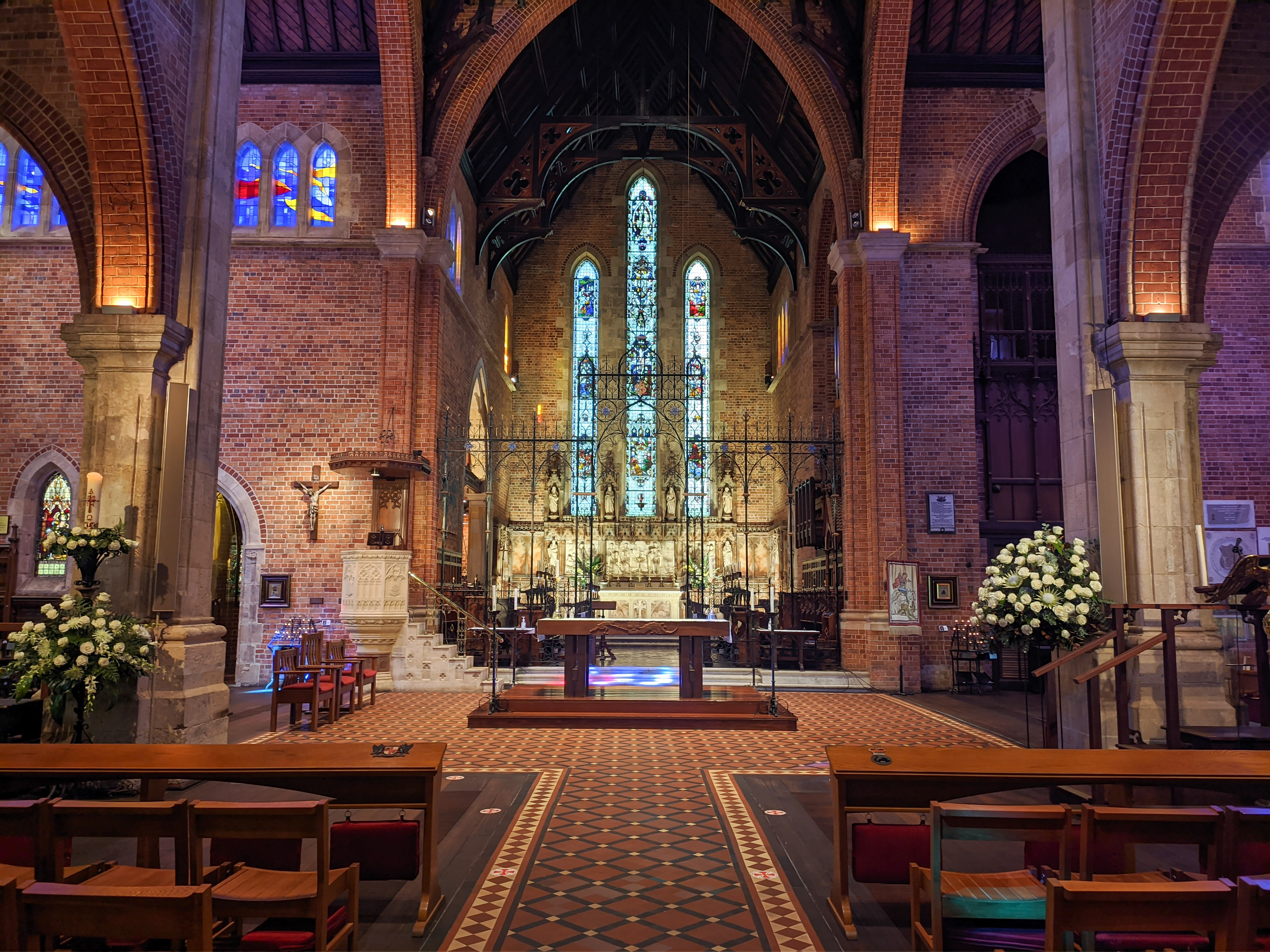
Chancel

== See also ==
- Saint George
- Saint George in devotions, traditions and prayers
- Peter Carnley
- List of Edmund Blacket buildings
- List of cathedrals in Australia
