= Elizabeth Couchman =

Australian politician

Dame Elizabeth Couchman DBE
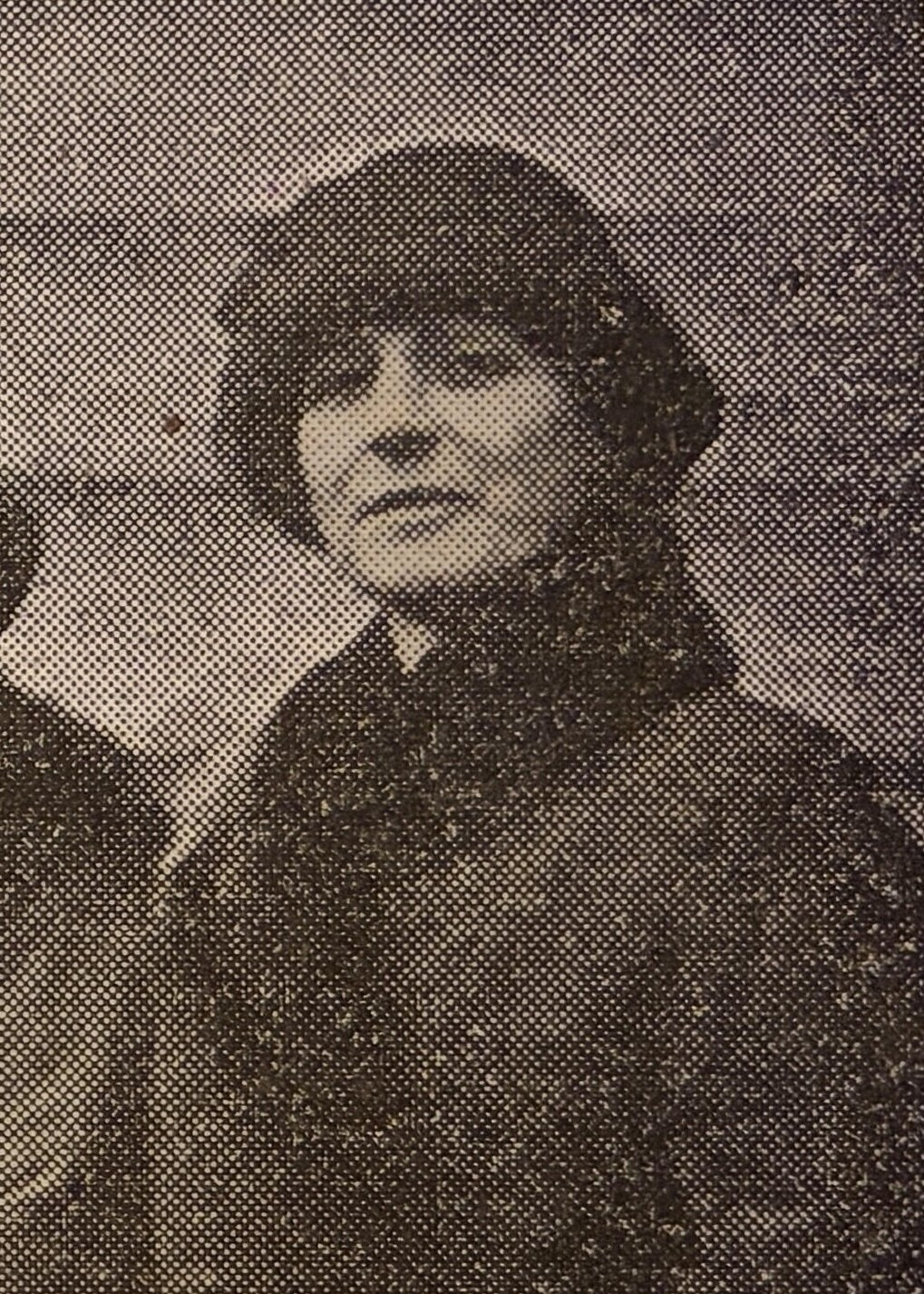
- Couchman in 1926
- Born: Elizabeth May Ramsay Tannock; 19 April 1876; Geelong, Victoria, Australia
- Died: 18 November 1982 (aged 106); Camberwell, Victoria, Australia
- Education: University of Western Australia
- Occupation: Political organiser
- Political party: UAP (to 1945); Liberal (from 1945)
- Other political affiliations: Australian Women's National League (to 1945)
- Spouse: Claude Couchman (m. 1917; died 1931)

Dame Elizabeth May Ramsay Couchman DBE (née Tannock; 19 April 1876 – 18 November 1982) was an Australian political activist. She served as president of the Australian Women's National League from 1927 to 1945 and oversaw its merger into the new Liberal Party of Australia. She was also the first woman appointed to the board of the Australian Broadcasting Commission (ABC), serving from 1932 to 1943.

== Biography ==
She was born Elizabeth May Ramsay Tannock, the daughter of Elizabeth Mary (née Ramsay), and Archibald Tannock. Her father was a confectioner. She had a sister, Jean, who married Henry Mercer, Dean of Perth from 1912 to 1917. She was born and grew up in Geelong, and was educated to matriculation level at the Girls' High School. She matriculated in 1895. After a period of teaching at the Methodist Ladies' College and Tintern Grammar, another independent girls' school, she moved to Perth, Australia in 1916 to complete a Bachelor of Arts degree at the University of Western Australia.

In 1917, aged 41, she married businessman Claude Couchman, but they had no children. He died ten years later. On his death she decided to devote the rest of her life to the pursuit of public interests, which included voluntary work and the duties of a Justice of the Peace. From 1927 to 1945, she was president of the Australian Women's National League, a conservative women's organisation established in 1904 to support the monarchy and empire, combat socialism, educate women in politics, and safeguard the interests of the home, women and children.

Between the world wars, the League claimed 40,000 members and was the largest continuous non-labour organisation, but those numbers had dwindled to approximately 12,000 by 1944. In 1945, it merged to help form the new Liberal Party of Australia. Couchman insisted on equal representation of women and men at all levels of the Victorian division, and was involved in establishing the branch structure of the party.

She worked in the Liberal Party organisation as a member of the state executive and state council, and served as Victorian vice-president of the party from 1949 to 1955. She was the first female to be appointed to the Australian Broadcasting Commission, from 1932 to 1940, and was a member of the Australian delegation to the League of Nations in 1934.

She sought pre-selection for the Senate on three occasions, but was unsuccessful. She eventually gained pre-selection for the safe Labor seat of Melbourne in the 1943 election, but was defeated.

Dame Elizabeth Couchman died in Melbourne, aged 106.

== Honours and recognition ==
She was appointed an Officer of the Order of the British Empire in the 1941 New Years Day Honours and promoted to Dame Commander in the 1961 New Years Day Honours for her public and patriotic services.

Couchman Crescent, in the Canberra suburb of Chisholm, is named in her honour.

The State Library of Victoria holds a collection of papers related to Couchman in its Manuscripts Collection. It comprises papers of the Australian Women's National League, 1920–1945, collected by Dame Elizabeth Couchman, and a history entitled "The Australian Women's National League, 1904-1945" by Elizabeth Couchman, 14 February 1969.
