= Lisa Darmanin (politician) =

Australian trade unionist and politician

Senator Lisa Darmanin
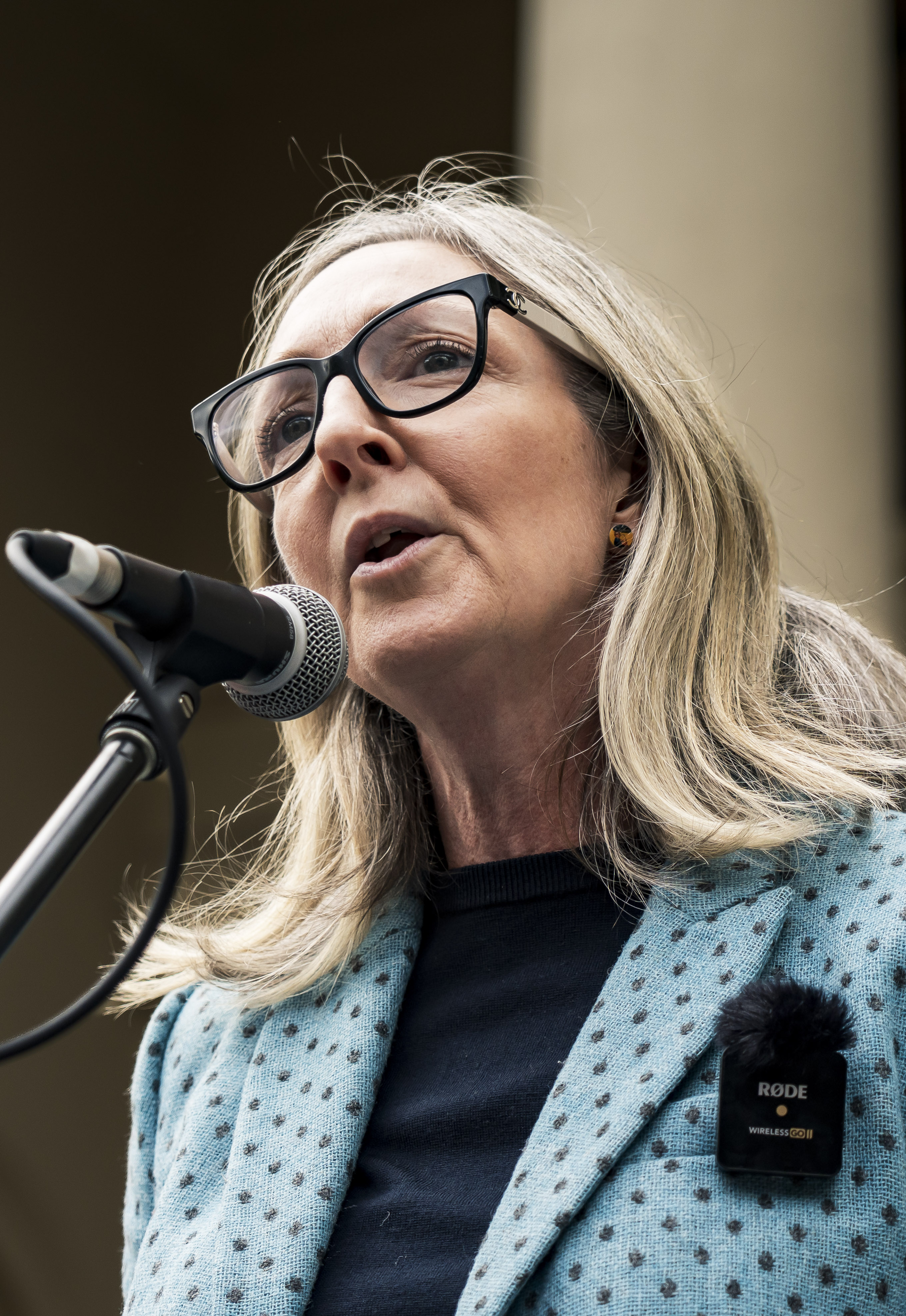

Senator for Victoria
- Incumbent
- Assumed office 29 May 2024
- Preceded by: Linda White

Personal details
- Party: Labor
- Occupation: Trade unionist

Lisa Darmanin (/ˈdɑːrmənən/ DAR-mə-nən) is an Australian trade unionist and politician who has been Branch Secretary of the Australian Services Union (ASU), Victorian and Tasmanian Authorities and Services Branch since June 2018 and Chair of Vision Super since 1 July 2021. She is a member of the Australian Labor Party (ALP) and was selected to replace Linda White as a Senator for Victoria in 2024.

== Career ==
Darmanin has a Bachelor of Business (Industrial Relations and HR Management) and a Diploma of Community Development. She began her association with the ASU as a member and active workplace delegate, from Berry Street Victoria in 1997. She began work as an ASU organiser in 2000.

In 2006, Darmanin spent time on secondment at various roles including in the Victorian Department of Premier and Cabinet, working on Victorian Government initiatives in gender equality and family violence prevention, and Victorian Trades Hall Council (VTHC), where she coordinated the Your Rights at Work campaign in Victoria. She was first elected as ASU Assistant Branch Secretary in 2007, with responsibility for Organising and Campaigning and co-ordination of the Social and Community Services Division.

Darmanin became Chair of Vision Super on 1 July 2021.

=== Senate ===
In February 2024, Senator Linda White died in office. In April 2024, Darmanin was selected by the party to replace her. On 29 May 2024, Darmanin was appointed to the Senate in a joint sitting of the Parliament of Victoria.

== Personal life ==
Darmanin lives in Melbourne with her husband and two sons.

Parliament of Australia
Preceded by Linda White	Senator for Victoria; 2024–present	Incumbent
