= Candidates of the 1974 Australian federal election =

This article provides information on candidates who stood for the 1974 Australian federal election. The election was held on 18 May 1974.

== Redistributions and seat changes ==
- Redistributions of electoral boundaries occurred in Western Australia and the Australian Capital Territory.
  - In Western Australia, a new seat, Tangney (notionally Labor), was created.
  - The division of Australian Capital Territory was split into divisions, Canberra and Fraser, both notionally Labor. The member for the ACT, Kep Enderby (Labor), contested Canberra.

== Retiring Members and Senators ==
=== Labor ===
- Fred Birrell MP (Port Adelaide, SA)
- Senator Harry Cant (WA)
- Senator Joe Fitzgerald (NSW)
- Senator Bob Poke (Tas)
- Senator Laurie Wilkinson (WA)

=== Liberal ===
- Les Bury MP (Wentworth, NSW)
- Marshall Cooke MP (Petrie, Qld)
- Sir John Cramer MP (Bennelong, NSW)
- Harry Turner MP (Bradfield, NSW)
- Ray Whittorn MP (Balaclava, Vic)
- Senator Dame Nancy Buttfield (SA)
- Senator Elliot Lillico (Tas)

=== Democratic Labor ===
- Senator Vince Gair (Qld)

=== Independent ===
- Senator Reg Turnbull (Tas)

== House of Representatives ==
Sitting members at the time of the election are shown in bold text. Successful candidates are highlighted in the relevant colour. Where there is possible confusion, an asterisk (*) is also used.

=== Australian Capital Territory ===
Electorate	Held by	Labor candidate	Coalition candidate	Australia candidate	Other candidates
Canberra	Labor	**Kep Enderby**	Peter Hughes (Lib); Dorothy Mattress (CP)	Mary Thomas	Doreen Story (ARP)
Fraser	Labor	Ken Fry	Stephen Lamb (CP); Larry Pickering (Lib)	John Filler	Anthony Emerson-Elliott (Ind); Kevin Wise (Ind)

=== New South Wales ===
Electorate	Held by	Labor candidate	Coalition candidate	Australia candidate	Other candidates
Banks	Labor	**Vince Martin**	Peter Kintominas (Lib)	Garry Bennett	
Barton	Labor	**Len Reynolds**	Jim Bradfield (Lib)	Charles Margetson	
Bennelong	Liberal	Dick Hall	John Howard (Lib)	Gillian Sutton	John Anlezark (Ind)
Berowra	Liberal	George Williams	**Harry Edwards** (Lib)	Patricia Wallace	
Blaxland	Labor	**Paul Keating**	Wallace Smallwood (Lib)	Kenneth Higgs	
Bradfield	Liberal	Bruce Abrahams	David Connolly (Lib)	Colvin Johnston	
Calare	Country	Neville Bowers; Francis Hall	**John England** (CP)	Douglas Bray	
Chifley	Labor	**John Armitage**	Patricia Robinson (Lib)	Phillip Lambert	
Cook	Labor	**Ray Thorburn**	Don Dobie (Lib)	Milo Dunphy	Ronald Gallagher (Ind)
Cowper	Country	Thomas Cronin	**Ian Robinson** (CP)	James Davies	Raymond Hardy (Ind)
Cunningham	Labor	**Rex Connor**	Warren Hough (Lib)	Susan Healy	
Darling	Labor	**John FitzPatrick**	Max Overton (CP); William Thornton (Lib)	Peter Farry	
Eden-Monaro	Labor	**Bob Whan**	Jonathan Bell (Lib); Ron Brewer (CP)	Keith Hughes	
Evans	Labor	**Allan Mulder**	John Abel (Lib)	Paul Flottmann	John McGarity (Ind)
Farrer	Liberal	Kevin Esler	**David Fairbairn** (Lib)	Peter Benton	
Grayndler	Labor	**Fred Daly**	Jonathan Fowler (Lib)	Gregory Berry	
Gwydir	Country	Francis Bourke	**Ralph Hunt** (CP)	James Thompson	
Hughes	Labor	**Les Johnson**	Philip Benwell (Lib)	Walter Skarschewski	
Hume	Labor	**Frank Olley**	Stephen Lusher* (CP); Graham Thompson (Lib)	John Gedye	
Hunter	Labor	**Bert James**	Alex Bevan (Lib)	Des Kynaston	
Kingsford-Smith	Labor	**Lionel Bowen**	Gary McCready (Lib)	Anthony Green	
Lang	Labor	**Frank Stewart**	Barry Peffer (Lib)	George Edgell	
Lowe	Liberal	Doug Sutherland	**William McMahon** (Lib)	Bent Poulsen	Bronte Douglas (Ind)
Lyne	Country	Ken Reed	**Philip Lucock** (CP)	David Haig	
Macarthur	Labor	**John Kerin**	David Wood (Lib)	Jill Kerr	
Mackellar	Liberal	Evan Davies	**Bill Wentworth** (Lib)	Noel Gash	
Macquarie	Labor	**Tony Luchetti**	Michael Hunt (CP); Malcolm Mackay (Lib); Steven Parrott (CP)	Gregory Woodward	
Mitchell	Labor	**Alfred Ashley-Brown**	Alan Cadman (Lib)	John Butterworth	
New England	Country	William Bischoff	**Ian Sinclair** (CP)	Brian Edwards	
Newcastle	Labor	**Charles Jones**	Arthur Thomas (Lib)	Ellen Rose	
North Sydney	Liberal	Patrick Healy	**Bill Graham** (Lib)	James Feros	Romualds Kemps (Ind)
Parramatta	Liberal	Barry Wilde	**Philip Ruddock** (Lib)	Robert MacKenzie	Derek Barker (Ind)
Paterson	Country	Noel Unicomb	**Frank O'Keefe** (CP)	Robert Fowler	
Phillip	Labor	**Joe Riordan**	Jack Cunningham (Lib)	Virginia Walker	David Taylor (Ind)
Prospect	Labor	**Dick Klugman**	Donald MacDonald (Lib)	Geoffrey Thomas	
Reid	Labor	**Tom Uren**	Thomas Faulkner (Lib)	Astrid O'Neill	
Richmond	Country	Frederick Braid	**Doug Anthony** (CP)	Bernard Walrut	
Riverina	Labor	**Al Grassby**	Donald Mackay (Lib); John Sullivan* (CP)	John Thomson	
Robertson	Labor	**Barry Cohen**	Hugh Chalmers (Lib)	Jennifer Baker	
St George	Labor	**Bill Morrison**	Brian Booth (Lib)	Harry Jagers	
Shortland	Labor	**Peter Morris**	David Morris (Lib)	John Steele	Lionel Lambkin (Ind)
Sydney	Labor	**Jim Cope**	Janis Wallace (Lib)	Julia Bovard	Pat Clancy (SPA)
Warringah	Liberal	Allan Hughes	**Michael MacKellar** (Lib)	Allan Mann	Edwin Mayne (Ind); Eric Riches (Ind)
Wentworth	Liberal	Paul Hawcroft	Bob Ellicott (Lib)	Julia Featherstone	
Werriwa	Labor	**Gough Whitlam**	Michael Darby (Lib)	Robert Tuckwell	Robert Demkiw (Ind); Steve Dodd (Ind); Eileen Eason (Ind); Ross May (NSP); Veljko Prlja (Ind); Ian Robertson (Ind); Leslie Shaw (Ind); Margaret Tomkins (Ind); Arthur Wiles (Ind)

=== Northern Territory ===
Electorate	Held by	Labor candidate	Country candidate	Independent candidate
Northern Territory	Country	John Waters	**Sam Calder**	Alexander Allan-Stewart

=== Queensland ===
Electorate	Held by	Labor candidate	Coalition candidate	Australia candidate	Independent candidate
Bowman	Labor	**Len Keogh**	David Jull (Lib); Gerry Langevad (CP)	Winifred Sharkey	
Brisbane	Labor	**Manfred Cross**	Jim Anderson (Lib); Bill Siller (CP)	Jeffrey Malyon	
Capricornia	Labor	**Doug Everingham**	Kevin Connor (CP); Noel Kenny (Lib)		Therese Warner
Darling Downs	Country	Ronald Madden	**Tom McVeigh** (CP)	William Nobes	
Dawson	Labor	**Rex Patterson**	Ray Braithwaite (CP)		
Fisher	Country	Hamish Linacre	**Evan Adermann** (CP)		
Griffith	Liberal	Clem Jones	**Don Cameron** (Lib)	Beth Smith	Cecil Birchley
Herbert	Liberal	John Rockett	**Robert Bonnett** (Lib)	Leonard Weber	
Kennedy	Country	Tony McGrady	**Bob Katter** (CP)		
Leichhardt	Labor	**Bill Fulton**	Herbert Marsh (CP)	Robert Ellwood	
Lilley	Labor	**Frank Doyle**	Kevin Cairns* (Lib); Albert Postle (CP)	James Webb	
McPherson	Liberal	Tom Veivers	**Eric Robinson** (Lib)	Robert Richardson	
Maranoa	Country	Janice Saltau	**James Corbett** (CP)		
Moreton	Liberal	William Forgan-Smith	**James Killen** (Lib)	Robert McClintock	
Oxley	Labor	**Bill Hayden**	Allan Whybird (Lib)	Arthur Smith	
Petrie	Liberal	Denis Murphy	Peter Addison (CP); John Hodges* (Lib)	Jill Ritchie	
Ryan	Liberal	James Herlihy	**Nigel Drury** (Lib)	Ruth Chenoweth	
Wide Bay	Labor	**Brendan Hansen**	Clarrie Millar* (CP); Ian Theodore (Lib)		

=== South Australia ===
Electorate	Held by	Labor candidate	Coalition candidate	LM candidate	Australia candidate	Independent candidate
Adelaide	Labor	**Chris Hurford**	Harold Steele (Lib)	Ray Buttery	John Davies	
Angas	Liberal	Adolf Thiel	**Geoffrey Giles*** (Lib); Sam Pfeiffer (CP)	Henry Nicholls	Kate Hannaford	
Barker	Liberal	Jim Hennessy	Malcolm Adams (CP); **Jim Forbes*** (Lib)	Dick Clampett	Colyn van Reenen	Arthur Strachan
Bonython	Labor	**Martin Nicholls**	Alan Irving (CP); Rudolph Masopust (Lib)	Jan Staska	Derek Ball	
Boothby	Liberal	John Trainer	**John McLeay** (Lib)	Peter Berman	Colin Miller	
Grey	Labor	**Laurie Wallis**	Dennis Burman (Lib); George Heading (CP)	Nigel Clarke	Bill McMahon	
Hawker	Labor	**Ralph Jacobi**	Henry Winter (Lib)	Peter Holder	Phillip Vickery	
Hindmarsh	Labor	**Clyde Cameron**	Iris MacDonald (Lib)	Kelvin Schultz	Wayne Kelly	
Kingston	Labor	**Richard Gun**	Peter Tonkin (Lib)	Peter Heysen	Janet Veilands	
Port Adelaide	Labor	Mick Young	Clarence Hinson (Lib)	Jean Lawrie	Alan Jamieson	James Mitchell
Sturt	Liberal	Graham Maguire	**Ian Wilson** (Lib)	Betty Hall	Roger Marshman	Anthony Figallo
Wakefield	Liberal	Peter Dewhurst	Ronald Crosby (CP); **Bert Kelly*** (Lib)	John Freebairn	Ian Swan	

=== Tasmania ===
Electorate	Held by	Labor candidate	Liberal candidate	Other candidates
Bass	Labor	**Lance Barnard**	John Beswick	
Braddon	Labor	**Ron Davies**	Ray Groom	John Chapman-Mortimer (Ind); Walter Roach (AP)
Denison	Labor	**John Coates**	Michael Hodgman	
Franklin	Labor	**Ray Sherry**	Leo Jarvis	
Wilmot	Labor	**Gil Duthie**	Max Burr	

=== Victoria ===
Electorate	Held by	Labor candidate	Coalition candidate	DLP candidate	Australia candidate	Independent candidate
Balaclava	Liberal	Irene Dunsmuir	Ian Macphee (Lib)	Peter Lawlor	Michael Muschamp	
Ballaarat	Liberal	David Williams	**Dudley Erwin** (Lib)	Bryan Hanrahan	Pamela Clifford	
Batman	Labor	**Horrie Garrick**	Keith Smith (Lib)	Kevin Barry	Geoffrey Loftus-Hills	
Bendigo	Liberal	David Kennedy	**John Bourchier** (Lib)	Paul Brennan	Robert Stenton	Joe Pearce (Ind)
Bruce	Liberal	Russell Oakley	**Billy Snedden** (Lib)	Rex Harper	Iris Pederick	Glen Mann (Ind); Diana Martin (Ind); John Ryan (Ind)
Burke	Labor	**Keith Johnson**	Claus Salger (Lib)	Colin Walsh	Alexander Gerocs	
Casey	Labor	**Race Mathews**	Peter Falconer (Lib)	John McKenna	Clive Champion	Joe Schillani (ARP)
Chisholm	Liberal	Alastair Nicholson	**Tony Staley** (Lib)	Joe Stanley	Frank Penhalluriack	
Corangamite	Liberal	Edwin Morris	**Tony Street** (Lib)	Francis O'Brien	Ian Slater	
Corio	Labor	**Gordon Scholes**	Gordon Hall (Lib)	John Timberlake	Guenter Sahr	
Deakin	Liberal	Gavan Oakley	**Alan Jarman** (Lib)	Jim Brosnan	Harold Jeffrey	Bill French (Ind); Stanley Lyden (Ind)
Diamond Valley	Labor	**David McKenzie**	Geoffrey Waite (Lib)	Christopher Curtis	Harold Taskis	Victor Gibson (Ind)
Flinders	Liberal	Colin Bednall	**Phillip Lynch** (Lib)	John Glynn	David Heath	Beatrice Faust (Ind)
Gellibrand	Labor	**Ralph Willis**	Cecile Storey (Lib)	Bert Bailey	Veronica Schwarz	
Gippsland	Country	Hugh Oakes	**Peter Nixon** (CP)	John Condon	John Bowron	
Henty	Liberal	Joan Child	**Max Fox** (Lib)	Terry Farrell	Michael Hughes	
Higgins	Liberal	Wilhelm Kapphan	**John Gorton** (Lib)	Thomas Magree	Rafe Slaney	
Holt	Labor	**Max Oldmeadow**	Len Reid (Lib)	Robert Fidler	Joseph Busuttil	
Hotham	Liberal	Tony Ross	**Don Chipp** (Lib)	Frank Gaffy	Richard Franklin	John Murray (ARP)
Indi	Country	Alan Bell	**Mac Holten** (CP)	Christopher Cody	Jim Dimo	
Isaacs	Liberal	Gareth Clayton	**David Hamer** (Lib)	William Leech	Elizabeth Chesterfield	James Bernard (Ind); Janus Fawke (Ind)
Kooyong	Liberal	Wellington Lee	**Andrew Peacock** (Lib)	Francis Duffy	Frances Vorrath	Ian Channell (Ind)
La Trobe	Labor	**Tony Lamb**	Marshall Baillieu (Lib)	Daniel Mason	Don Walters	William Bryant (Ind)
Lalor	Labor	**Jim Cairns**	Francis Purnell (Lib)	John Bacon	William Inglis	
Mallee	Country	Brian Smith	**Peter Fisher** (CP)	Stanley Croughan	John Grigg	
Maribyrnong	Labor	**Moss Cass**	Rex Webb (Lib)	Paul McManus	John Watson	
McMillan	Country	Barry Murphy	Ronald Dent (Lib); **Arthur Hewson*** (CP)	Les Hilton	Ronald Broadhurst	
Melbourne	Labor	**Ted Innes**	Haset Sali (Lib)	Anna Linard	Martin Kerr	Philip Scott (Ind)
Melbourne Ports	Labor	**Frank Crean**	John Walsh (Lib)	John Johnston	Beverley Broadbent	
Murray	Country	Dennis Dodd	Bill Hunter (Lib); **Bruce Lloyd*** (CP)	Patrick Payne	Peter Schoeffel	Hugh Dunn (Ind)
Scullin	Labor	**Harry Jenkins**	Alan Stanley (Lib)	Bernard McGrath	John Kotre	
Wannon	Liberal	Ted Garth	**Malcolm Fraser** (Lib)	John Casanova	Peter Hopgood	
Wills	Labor	**Gordon Bryant**	John Bales (Lib)	John Flint	Stanley Bell	Bruce Drinkwater (ARP)
Wimmera	Country	Brian Brooke	**Robert King*** (CP); Heather Mitchell (Lib)	Kevin Dunn	Keith Sullivan	

=== Western Australia ===
Electorate	Held by	Labor candidate	Liberal candidate	NA candidate	Australia candidate	Other candidates
Canning	Country	James Laffer	Mel Bungey	**John Hallett**	John Duncan	
Curtin	Liberal	John Crouch	**Victor Garland**	Terry McDonnell	Dennis Fyfe	Jeannette Forsyth (Ind)
Forrest	Liberal	Albert Newman	**Peter Drummond**	Terence Best	Lawrence Gibson	
Fremantle	Labor	**Kim Beazley**	Douglas Fernihough	Peter Moorehouse	Charles Pierce	
Kalgoorlie	Labor	**Fred Collard**	Mick Cotter	George Kyros	Ian Kelly	James Jackson (Ind)
Moore	Country	Rodney Boland	John Hyde	**Don Maisey**	Syd Hickman	
Perth	Labor	**Joe Berinson**	Derrick Tomlinson	Dorothy Cranley	Wilfred Campin	Paul Marsh (CPA)
Stirling	Liberal	Graham Reece	**Ian Viner**	Marie Clark	Carolyn Tonge	
Swan	Labor	**Adrian Bennett**	Geoffrey Hale	Pietro Bendotti	Archelaus Marshall	
Tangney	Labor	John Dawkins	Peter Whyte	June Bunce	Wendy Russell-Brown	

== Senate ==
Sitting Senators are shown in bold text. Since this was a double dissolution election, all senators were up for re-election. The first five successful candidates from each state were elected to a six-year term, the remaining five to a three-year term. Tickets that elected at least one Senator are highlighted in the relevant colour. Successful candidates are identified by an asterisk (*).

=== New South Wales ===
Ten seats were up for election. The Labor Party was defending six seats. The Liberal-Country Coalition was defending three seats. The Democratic Labor Party was defending one seat.

Labor candidates	Coalition candidates	DLP candidates	Australia candidates	Communist candidates	NSP candidates
1. **Lionel Murphy***; 2. **Doug McClelland***; 3. **Tony Mulvihill***; 4. **Jim McClelland***; 5. **Arthur Gietzelt***; 6. Peter Westerway	1. **Bob Cotton*** (Lib); 2. **John Carrick*** (Lib); 3. Douglas Scott* (CP); 4. **Sir Kenneth Anderson*** (Lib); 5. Peter Baume* (Lib); 6. Doug Moppett (CP)	1. **Jack Kane**; 2. Peter Keogh; 3. Bill Casey	1. Bridget Gilling; 2. Gordon Barton; 3. Mike Donelan	1. Jack Mundey; 2. Pat Miller; 3. Brian McGahen	1. John Stewart; 2. Robert Cameron
Republican candidates	Social Credit candidates	Group A candidates	Group B candidates	Group D candidates	Group E candidates
1. Brian Buckley; 2. Kieran O'Grady	1. Alan Pagett; 2. Allan Boulton	1. James Malcolm; 2. James Hampson	1. Ronald Sarina; 2. John Thomas	1. Frieda Brown; 2. Fred Nile; 3. Ken Harrison	1. Keith Roser; 2. Peter Lawrence
Group J candidates	Group K candidates	Group L candidates	Group N candidates	Group P candidates	Group R candidates
1. Sandor Torzsok; 2. Elizabeth Collins	1. Noel Macdonald; 2. Nick Maina; 3. Laurie Clapperton; 4. Barry Clancy	1. Bruce Taber; 2. Trevor Williams	1. Alfred Stoney; 2. Daniel Neville; 3. George Alexander	1. Alexander Gillman; 2. Reginald King; 3. William Whiston	1. Helen Stables; 2. Patricia Taylor; 3. Lorraine O'Callaghan; 4. Patricia Alcorn; 5. Lorraine Parkinson; 6. Robyn Swan; 7. Frances Fleeton
Ungrouped candidates
Frances Hancock; Cecil Carter; Frank Browne	Brian Howard; Marc Aussie-Stone; Tiiu Kroll	Douglas Fahey; Arthur Renforth; Leopold Heimburger	Roger Pedley; Charles Bellchambers; James McClelland	Dianne Allen; Catherine Dalton; Ivor F	Joseph Gelbar

=== Queensland ===
Ten seats were up for election. The Labor Party was defending four seats. The Liberal-Country Coalition was defending four seats. The Democratic Labor Party was defending two seats.

Labor candidates	Coalition candidates	DLP candidates	Australia candidates	Group C candidates	Ungrouped candidates
1. **Bertie Milliner***; 2. **George Georges***; 3. **Jim Keeffe***; 4. **Ron McAuliffe***; 5. Mal Colston; 6. Brian Kilmartin	1. **Ian Wood*** (Lib); 2. **Ron Maunsell*** (CP); 3. **Neville Bonner*** (Lib); 4. **Ellis Lawrie*** (CP); 5. Kathy Martin* (Lib); 6. Glen Sheil* (CP)	1. **Condon Byrne**; 2. Geoffrey Maule; 3. Jack Williams	1. Robert Wensley; 2. Joan Wright; 3. Patrick Callioni	1. Tor Hundloe; 2. Jan McNicol	Alan Russell; Pamela Woods; Will Steer; Edward Farmer; Hubert Giesberts

=== South Australia ===
Ten seats were up for election. The Labor Party was defending five seats. The Liberal Party was defending five seats.

Labor candidates	Liberal candidates	LM candidates	Country candidates	DLP candidates	Australia candidates
1. **Reg Bishop***; 2. **Jim Cavanagh***; 3. **Don Cameron***; 4. **Arnold Drury***; 5. **Geoff McLaren***; 6. Neal Blewett	1. **Condor Laucke***; 2. **Harold Young***; 3. **Gordon Davidson***; 4. **Don Jessop***; 5. Tony Messner; 6. Grant Chapman	1. Steele Hall*; 2. Allan Perryman; 3. Dolek Thiele; 4. Stewart Leggett; 5. Heather Southcott; 6. Ronald Moulds	1. John Ryan; 2. Henry Young; 3. Dennis Edwards	1. Mark Posa; 2. Leon Dalle-Nogare; 3. David le Cornu	1. Ian Gilfillan; 2. David Hester; 3. Kathy Dancer
Communist candidates	UCP candidates	Group H candidates	Group I candidates	Ungrouped candidates	
1. Yuri Joakamidis; 2. Elliott Johnston; 3. Rob Durbridge	1. John Steele; 2. Violet Nash	1. George Romeyko; 2. William Rooney	1. Barrie Tornquist; 2. Ian Drummond	Brian McCarthy; H-Berrill	

=== Tasmania ===
Ten seats were up for election. The Labor Party was defending four seats. The Liberal Party was defending four seats. Independent Senator Michael Townley was defending one seat. One seat had been held by Independent Senator Reg Turnbull.

Labor candidates	Liberal candidates	Country candidates	DLP candidates	UTG candidates	Group B candidates	Ungrouped candidates
1. **Ken Wriedt***; 2. **Justin O'Byrne***; 3. **Don Devitt***; 4. Merv Everett*; 5. Don Grimes*; 6. Geoffrey Lincoln	1. **Peter Rae***; 2. **Reg Wright***; 3. **John Marriott***; 4. Eric Bessell*; 5. Neil Robson; 6. William Craig	1. Bill Casimaty; 2. Kenneth Finney; 3. Rosalie Hine	1. Jindrich Nermut; 2. Cornelius McShane	1. Richard Jones; 2. Bill Mollison; 3. Mike Dell	1. Eric Wilson; 2. Leslie Coleman	**Michael Townley***; Maxwell Heathcote; Rosemary Everett; Richard Mulcahy; Nigel Abbott; Neil Mickleborough; Peter Cooper; Marilyn Rose; Ronald Excell; Laurence Ford

=== Victoria ===
Ten seats were up for election. The Labor Party was defending three seats. The Liberal-Country Coalition was defending five seats (although Liberal Senator George Hannan was contesting the election for the National Liberal Party). The Democratic Labor Party was defending two seats.

Labor candidates	Coalition candidates	DLP candidates	Australia candidates	NLP candidates	Communist candidates
1. **Bill Brown***; 2. **Cyril Primmer***; 3. John Button*; 4. **George Poyser***; 5. Jean Melzer*; 6. Geoffrey Cox	1. **Sir Magnus Cormack*** (Lib); 2. **Ivor Greenwood*** (Lib); 3. **James Webster*** (CP); 4. **Margaret Guilfoyle*** (Lib); 5. Alan Missen* (Lib); 6. Tom Tehan (CP)	1. **Frank McManus**; 2. **Jack Little**; 3. Frank Dowling; 4. Jim Marmion; 5. Marianne Crowe; 6. Michael Houlihan	1. John Siddons; 2. Jack Hammond; 3. Murray Deerbon; 4. Brian Zouch	1. **George Hannan**; 2. Monty Hollow; 3. Luke Cuni	1. Bernie Taft; 2. Lyn Hovey; 3. Max Ogden
Group E candidates	Group H candidates	Group I candidates	Ungrouped candidates		
1. Bruce McGuinness; 2. Elizabeth Hoffman	1. John Howson; 2. Patricia Stoll	1. Keith Tarrant; 2. Paul Palmos	Leslie Rubinstein; John Teare; Ronald Batten; Joseph Rudnicki; Charles Campagnac	Edwin Ditchfield; George Samargis; Alfred Kouris; Cecil Beaton; Marko Bagaric	Dulcie Bethune; John Roseman; Ian Sykes; Shane Watson

=== Western Australia ===
Ten seats were up for election. The Labor Party was defending four seats. The Liberal Party was defending three seats. The National Alliance, an amalgamation of the Country Party and the DLP, was defending two seats. Independent Senator Syd Negus was defending one seat.

Labor candidates	Liberal candidates	NA candidates	Australia candidates	Negus candidates	Secession candidates
1. **Don Willesee***; 2. **John Wheeldon***; 3. Gordon McIntosh*; 4. Peter Walsh*; 5. Ruth Coleman*; 6. Bob Hetherington	1. **Reg Withers***; 2. **Peter Sim***; 3. **Peter Durack***; 4. Fred Chaney*; 5. Pauline Iles; 6. Andrew Thomas	1. **Tom Drake-Brockman***; 2. **David Reid**; 3. William Sullivan; 4. Rosemary Taboni; 5. Arnold Bilney	1. Diana Hislop; 2. Ian Kelly	1. **Syd Negus**; 2. Wayne Negus	1. Don Thomas; 2. Harlan Mullins; 3. Brian Saunders; 4. Neil Scrimgeour
Group G candidates	Ungrouped candidates				
1. Derk Brocx; 2. William Webse	Duncan Hordacre; Frank Nesci				

== Summary by party ==
Beside each party is the number of seats contested by that party in the House of Representatives for each state, as well as an indication of whether the party contested the Senate election in the respective state.

Party	NSW		Vic		Qld		WA		SA		Tas		ACT	NT	Total	
Party	HR	S	HR	S	HR	S	HR	S	HR	S	HR	S	HR	HR	HR	S
Australian Labor Party	45	*	34	*	18	*	10	*	12	*	5	*	2	1	127	6
Liberal Party of Australia	38	*	31	*	12	*	10	*	12	*	5	*	2		110	6
Australian Country Party	13	*	6	*	12	*			5	*		*	2	1	39	5
National Alliance							10	*							10	1
Australia Party	45	*	34	*	12	*	10	*	12	*	1		2		116	5
Democratic Labor Party		*	34	*		*				*		*			34	5
Liberal Movement									12	*					12	1
Australian Republican Party		*	3										1		4	1
Communist Party of Australia		*		*			1			*					1	3
National Socialist Party of Australia	1	*													1	1
Socialist Party of Australia	1														1	
Social Credit Party		*														1
National Liberal Party				*												1
Westralian Secession Movement								*								1
United Christian Party										*						1
United Tasmania Group												*				1
Independent and other	19		14		2		2		3		1		2	1	44	

== See also ==
- 1974 Australian federal election
- Members of the Australian House of Representatives, 1972–1974
- Members of the Australian House of Representatives, 1974–1975
- Members of the Australian Senate, 1971–1974
- Members of the Australian Senate, 1974–1975
- List of political parties in Australia
