= Members of the Australian Senate, 1974–1975 =

Senate composition at 9 July 1974
Government (29)
Labor (29) - (2 seat minority) (Note: Labor decreased to 27 and a 4 seat minority as a result of Labor senators Lionel Murphy and Bertie Milliner being replaced by Independents.)

Opposition (29) (Note: Coalition increased to 30 as a result of Michael Townley joining the Liberal party in February 1975.)
Coalition
Liberal (24)
Country Party (6)

Crossbench (2)
Liberal Movement (1)
Independent (1) (Note: Independent Michael Townley joined the Liberal party in February 1975. Independents Cleaver Bunton and Albert Field were appointed to casual vacancies.)

Changes in composition

This is a list of members of the Australian Senate from 1974 to 1975. The 18 May 1974 election was a double dissolution of both Houses, with all 127 seats in the House of Representatives, and all 60 seats in the Senate up for election. The incumbent Labor Party led by Prime Minister Gough Whitlam defeated the opposition Liberal Party led by Billy Snedden and their Coalition partner the Country Party led by Doug Anthony. (Note: In 1975 the Australian Country Party changed its name to the National Country Party.)

In accordance with section 13 of the Constitution, following a double dissolution of Parliament, the terms for senators commence on 1 July preceding the election – i.e., on 1 July 1973. The first five senators elected in each state were allocated the full six-year terms ending on 30 June 1979 while the other half were allocated three-year terms ending on 30 June 1976. However, in fact, the Senate was dissolved on 11 November 1975 for another double dissolution election on 13 December 1975.

The process for filling casual vacancies was complex. While senators were elected for a six-year term, people appointed to a casual vacancy only held office until the earlier of the next election for the House of Representatives or the Senate. It was an established convention that the state parliament choose (or the governor appoint) a replacement from the same political party as their predecessor, however this convention was not always followed. There were two appointments to casual vacancies in this term however neither followed the convention with Labor Senator Lionel Murphy being replaced by Independent Cleaver Bunton and Labor Senator Bertie Milliner being replaced by Albert Field who was expelled as a member of the Labor party for accepting the appointment instead of Labor nomination Mal Colston.

At the May 1974 election, Labor won 29 seats, the Coalition won 29 seats and the balance of power was shared by Liberal Movement Senator Steele Hall and Independent Michael Townley. The President of the Senate votes and if the votes are equal, the motion is defeated. Thus the Labor government needed the support of both cross-bench senators to pass any legislation. The Coalition was increased to 30 seats when Townley joined the Liberal party in February 1975 and thus could effectively block any government legislation or motions, but could not pass any motion on their own. Labor was reduced to 27 seats by the replacement of 2 Labor senators with independents. Field was sworn in on 9 September 1975, however he was given leave from 1 October, not to attend the Senate pending a High Court challenge to his eligibility. As a result, the Coalition had a majority in the Senate and as well as blocking supply, could also pass a motion to defer Supply until an election was called. Thus the casual appointments process contributed to the 1975 Australian constitutional crisis.

The controversial appointments of Senators Bunton and Field prompted the 1977 referendum to amend the Constitution to require a replacement senator to be a member of the same political party.

Senator	Party	State	Term ending	Years in office
Sir Ken Anderson	Liberal	New South Wales	1976	1953–1975
Peter Baume	Liberal	New South Wales	1976	1974–1991
Eric Bessell	Liberal	Tasmania	1976	1974–1975
Reg Bishop	Labor	South Australia	1979	1961–1981
Neville Bonner	Liberal	Queensland	1979	1971–1983
Bill Brown	Labor	Victoria	1979	1969–1970, 1971–1978
Cleaver Bunton (Note: Labor Senator Lionel Murphy resigned on 9 February 1975 to be appointed to the High Court of Australia; Independent Cleaver Bunton was appointed to fill the ensuing vacancy on 27 February until the double dissolution election on 13 December 1975.)	Independent	New South Wales	1975 (Note: Appointed to a casual vacancy and only held office until the earlier of the next election for the House of Representatives or the Senate.)	1975
John Button	Labor	Victoria	1979	1974–1993
Don Cameron	Labor	South Australia	1976	1969–1978
John Carrick	Liberal	New South Wales	1979	1970–1987
Jim Cavanagh	Labor	South Australia	1979	1961–1981
Fred Chaney	Liberal	Western Australia	1976	1974–1990
Ruth Coleman	Labor	Western Australia	1976	1974–1987
Sir Magnus Cormack	Liberal	Victoria	1979	1951–1953, 1962–1978
Bob Cotton	Liberal	New South Wales	1979	1965–1978
Gordon Davidson	Liberal	South Australia	1976	1961, 1962, 1965–1981
Don Devitt	Labor	Tasmania	1979	1965–1978
Tom Drake-Brockman	Country (Note: Tom Drake-Brockman stood as member of the National Alliance (Australia), a merger between the WA Country Party and WA Democratic Labor Party. Drake-Brockman was the only alliance candidate to win a seat at the May 1974 election and he subsequently sat as a member of the Country Party)	Western Australia	1979	1958, 1959–1978
Arnold Drury	Labor	South Australia	1976	1959–1975
Peter Durack	Liberal	Western Australia	1976	1970–1993
Merv Everett	Labor	Tasmania	1976	1974–1975
Albert Field (Note: Labor Senator Bertie Milliner died on 30 June 1975; independent Albert Field was appointed to fill the ensuing vacancy on 3 September until the double dissolution election on 13 December 1975.)	Independent	Queensland	1975	1975
George Georges	Labor	Queensland	1979	1967–1987
Arthur Gietzelt	Labor	New South Wales	1976	1970–1989
Ivor Greenwood	Liberal	Victoria	1979	1968–1976
Don Grimes	Labor	Tasmania	1976	1974–1987
Margaret Guilfoyle	Liberal	Victoria	1976	1970–1987
Steele Hall	Liberal Movement	South Australia	1979	1974–1977
Don Jessop	Liberal	South Australia	1976	1970–1991
Jim Keeffe	Labor	Queensland	1976	1964–1983
Sir Condor Laucke	Liberal	South Australia	1979	1967–1981
Ellis Lawrie	Liberal	Queensland	1976	1965–1975
John Marriott	Liberal	Tasmania	1976	1953–1975
Kathy Martin	Liberal	Queensland	1976	1974–1984
Ron Maunsell	Country	Queensland	1979	1967–1981
Ron McAuliffe	Labor	Queensland	1976	1970–1981
Doug McClelland	Labor	New South Wales	1979	1961–1987
Jim McClelland	Labor	New South Wales	1976	1970–1978
Gordon McIntosh	Labor	Western Australia	1976	1974–1987
Geoff McLaren	Labor	South Australia	1976	1970–1983
Jean Melzer	Labor	Victoria	1976	1974–1981
Bertie Milliner	Labor	Queensland	1979	1968–1975
Alan Missen	Liberal	Victoria	1976	1974–1986
Tony Mulvihill	Labor	New South Wales	1979	1964–1983
Lionel Murphy	Labor	New South Wales	1979	1962–1975
Justin O'Byrne (Note: Father of the Senate)	Labor	Tasmania	1979	1947–1981
George Poyser	Labor	Victoria	1976	1966–1975
Cyril Primmer	Labor	Victoria	1979	1971–1985
Peter Rae	Liberal	Tasmania	1979	1967–1986
Douglas Scott	Country	New South Wales	1976	1970, 1974–1985
Glen Sheil	Country	Queensland	1976	1974–1981
Peter Sim	Liberal	Western Australia	1979	1964–1981
Michael Townley	Independent/Liberal (Note: Michael Townley joined the Liberal Party in February 1975.)	Tasmania	1976	1970–1987
Peter Walsh	Labor	Western Australia	1976	1974–1993
James Webster	Country	Victoria	1976	1964–1981
John Wheeldon	Labor	Western Australia	1979	1964–1981
Don Willesee	Labor	Western Australia	1979	1950–1975
Reg Withers	Liberal	Western Australia	1979	1966, 1967–1987
Ian Wood	Liberal	Queensland	1979	1950–1978
Ken Wriedt	Labor	Tasmania	1979	1964–1980
Reg Wright	Liberal	Tasmania	1979	1950–1978
Harold Young	Liberal	South Australia	1979	1968–1981
