= Whitlam government =

Australian government, 1972–1975

Whitlam government

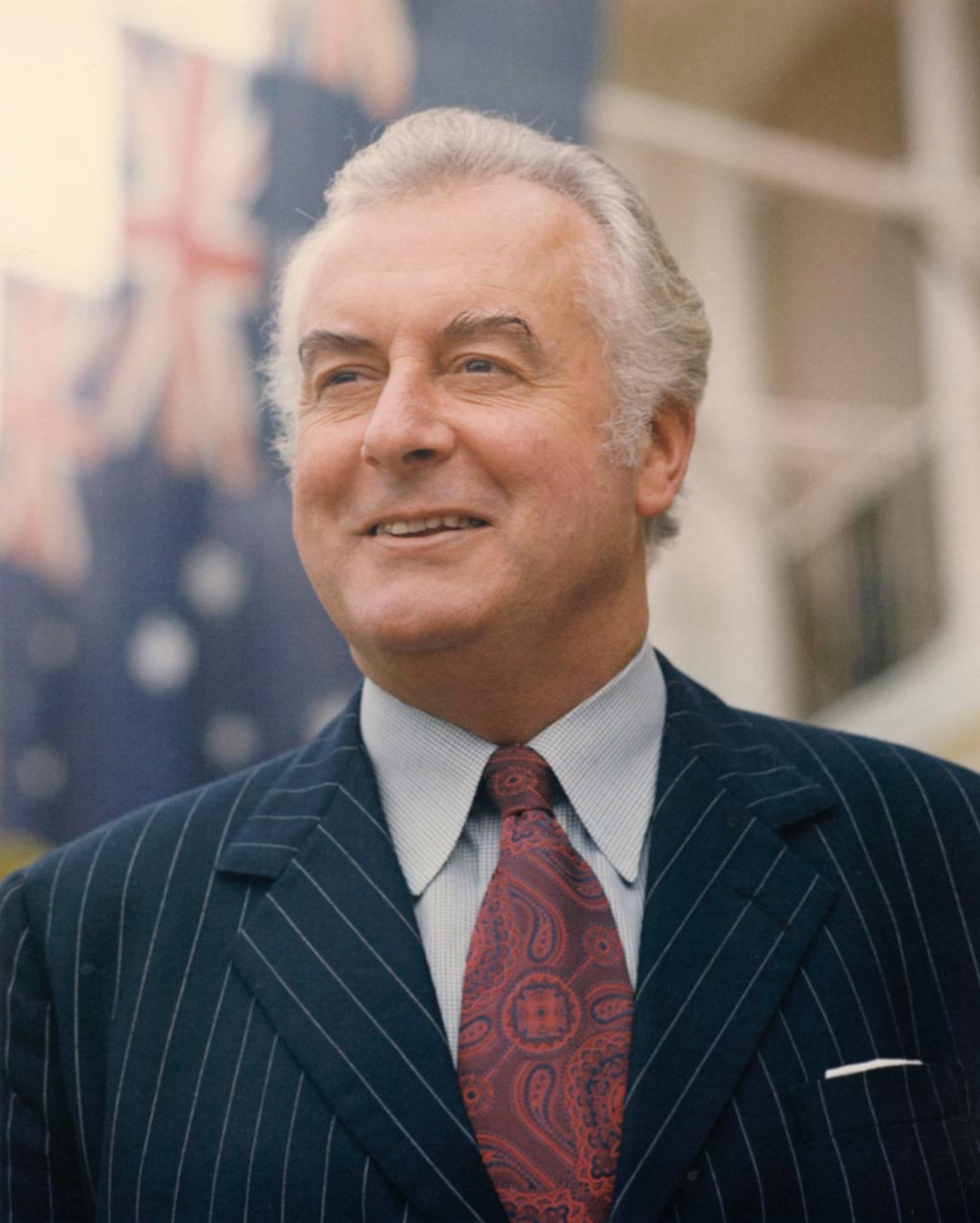

In office
- 5 December 1972 – 11 November 1975
- Monarch: Elizabeth II
- Prime Minister: Gough Whitlam
- Deputy: Lance Barnard (1972–1974); Jim Cairns (1974–1975); Frank Crean (1975)
- Party: Labor
- Origin: Won 1972 election
- Demise: Dismissed by the Governor-General
- Predecessor: McMahon government
- Successor: Fraser government

The Whitlam government was the federal executive government of Australia led by Prime Minister Gough Whitlam of the Australian Labor Party. The government commenced when Labor defeated the McMahon government at the 1972 federal election, ending a record 23 years of continuous Coalition government. It was terminated by Governor-General Sir John Kerr following the 1975 constitutional crisis and was succeeded by the Fraser government—the sole occasion in Australian history when an elected federal government was dismissed by the governor-general.

The Whitlam government was highly controversial during its short tenure but achieved some major reforms. Formal relations with China were established, conscription laws were repealed, all remaining Australian forces were withdrawn from the Vietnam War, universal healthcare was introduced and some remaining discriminatory provisions of the White Australia policy were abolished. Tertiary education fees were abolished. However, these and other ambitious reforms corresponded to a crisis: "By mid-1975, inflation hit 17.6 per cent and wage rises hit 32.9 per cent. The economy boomed in 1973 and the first half of '74, but then suffered a severe recession." The Whitlam government was re-elected for a second term at the 1974 double-dissolution election but, following the dismissal, was heavily defeated by the new Fraser government in the 1975 election.

== Background ==
The Australian Labor Party had entered opposition in 1949, following the loss of the Chifley government to the Robert Menzies-led Liberal-Country Party Coalition. The Coalition then governed continuously for 23 years. Gough Whitlam became deputy leader of the Labor Party in 1960, and Arthur Calwell subsequently retired as leader in 1967 following Labor's poor result in the 1966 election. Whitlam was elected party leader in April 1967, with Lance Barnard as deputy leader. Labor reduced the Gorton government's majority and came within 4 seats of government in the 1969 election. Whitlam then led the Labor Party to victory against the McMahon government at the 1972 election.

== First term ==
=== Duumvirate ===
Whitlam took office with a majority in the House of Representatives, but without control of the Senate (elected in 1967 and 1970). The Senate at that time consisted of ten members from each of the six states, elected by proportional representation. The ALP parliamentary caucus chose the ministers, but Whitlam was allowed to assign portfolios. A caucus meeting could not be held until after the final results came in on 15 December. In the meantime, it was expected that McMahon would remain caretaker prime minister. Whitlam, however, was unwilling to wait that long. On 5 December, once Labor's win was secure, Whitlam had the governor-general, Sir Paul Hasluck, swear him in as prime minister and Labor's deputy leader, Lance Barnard, as deputy prime minister. The two men held 27 portfolios between them during the two weeks before a full cabinet could be determined.

During the two weeks the so-called "duumvirate" held office, Whitlam sought to fulfill those campaign promises that did not require legislation. Whitlam ordered negotiations to establish full relations with the People's Republic of China, and broke those with Taiwan. Legislation allowed the Minister for Defence to grant exemptions from conscription. Barnard held this office, and exempted everyone. Seven men were at that time incarcerated for refusing conscription; Whitlam arranged for their freedom. The Whitlam government in its first days re-opened the equal pay case pending before the Commonwealth Conciliation and Arbitration Commission led by Sydney barrister Mary Gaudron, and appointed a woman, Elizabeth Evatt, as presidential member of the commission. Whitlam and Barnard eliminated sales tax on contraceptive pills, announced major grants for the arts, and appointed an interim schools commission. The duumvirate barred racially discriminatory sport teams from Australia, and instructed the Australian delegation at the United Nations to vote in favour of sanctions on apartheid South Africa and Rhodesia. It also ordered home all remaining Australian troops in Vietnam, though most (including all conscripts) had been withdrawn by McMahon.

According to Whitlam speechwriter Graham Freudenberg, the duumvirate was a success, as it showed that the Labor government could manipulate the machinery of government, despite its long absence from office. However, Freudenberg noted that the rapid pace and public excitement caused by the duumvirate's actions caused the Opposition to be wary of giving Labor too easy a time, and led to one post mortem verdict on the Whitlam government, "We did too much too soon."

=== Enacting an agenda ===
The McMahon government had consisted of 27 ministers, twelve of whom comprised the Cabinet. In the run-up to the election, the Labor caucus had decided that should the party take power, all 27 ministers were to be Cabinet members. Intense canvassing took place among ALP parliamentarians as the duumvirate did its work, and on 18 December the caucus elected the Cabinet. The results were generally acceptable to Whitlam, and within three hours, he had announced the portfolios of the cabinet members. To give himself greater control over the Cabinet, in January 1973 Whitlam established five cabinet committees (with the members appointed by himself, not the caucus) and took full control of the cabinet agenda.

During its time in office, the Whitlam government embarked on an ambitious program of social reform in keeping with the promise of change that the ALP campaign emphasised. As noted by one historian, "Labor’s extensive reforms during its first term in office were the high water mark of Australian postwar social democracy." On coming to office, the Whitlam government granted federal public servants paid maternity leave, a thirty-six-and-a-quarter-hour workweek, large wage rises and four weeks annual leave. Free tertiary education was introduced, together with a universal health care system and a sole parent pension. Laws were also passed providing for equal pay for women and national land rights, divorce laws were made more liberal, and legislation against racial discrimination was introduced. In addition, the principle of equal pay was extended, occupational health and safety was improved, annual leave loading was introduced, trade union education was established, four weeks of annual leave was achieved as a national standard military conscription was abolished and Australian troops were withdrawn from Vietnam, a separate ministry responsible for Aboriginal affairs was established, controls on foreign ownership of Australian resources were put in place, laws against sexual discrimination were passed, maternity leave and benefits for single mothers were extended, an attempt was made to democratise the electoral system through the introduction of one-vote-one-value, and a Community Health Program was introduced. The social services were also significantly expanded, with big improvements in the real value of social security payments, spending on housing quadrupled, education outlays doubled, and federal health expenditure rising by 20% A Department of Aboriginal Affairs was also established, while Australia's first federal legislation on human rights, the environment and heritage was initiated.

The Women's Electoral Lobby, founded in 1972, had helped Whitlam win government. In 1973, Elizabeth Reid was appointed the world's first adviser on women's affairs to a head of government. Through Reid's work in this role, the government took a greater role in the protection of women and increasing their rights; and, through the 1974 establishment and later recommendations of a Royal Commission on Human Relationships, a feminist reform agenda was put on the agenda for future action by the government. Among other reforms, the Whitlam government introduced three months' paid maternity leave, along with a week's paid paternity leave, for public servants, as well as the Supporting Mother's Benefit, in 1973.

A significant amount of legislation was passed altogether from 1972 to 1975, with 221 acts passed by parliament in 1973 alone, while the welfare state was significantly extended. Public spending was raised significantly, with the 1973 budget quadrupling spending on housing, tripling outlays on urban development, and doubling spending on education. Through initiatives such as the Australian Assistance Plan and the Regional Employment Development scheme, employment opportunities were expanded and funds allocated towards improving services and amenities in deprived areas, as characterised by the construction of new health centres, community houses, legal services, footpaths, sewers, streetlights, and public libraries.

In 1978, one observer praised the Australian Assistance Plan for generating "much more general acceptance of the concepts of welfare for the community and local participation. Moreover, a great deal had actually happened. During the year 1975-76, 1408 grants for community welfare projects were approved by the Social Security Department. A detailed list of AAP projects includes projects relating to citizens' advice bureaus, community centres, and resource centres, projects to aid families, women, children, young people, the aged, the handicapped, migrants and the needy. It would be difficult to refute the conclusion that the sum of $6.6 million granted to Regional Councils of Social Development in 1975-76 promoted a very large amount of constructive welfare activity because it was spent in support of local and often voluntary efforts".

Broadcast and television licence fees were abolished, while a wide range of new benefits were introduced, such as a handicapped child's allowance, a special orphan's pension, and the Supporting Mothers Benefit. Rates of sickness and unemployment benefits were increased to bring them in line with other social security benefits, while funding was provided for child care, women's refuges, and community health programs. The means test for pensioners over the age of seventy-five was abolished in 1973, and in 1975 the means test was abolished for all pensioners over the age of seventy. As a result of the welfare measures undertaken by the Whitlam government, social expenditures as a percentage of GDP rose from 12.5% to 17.6% during its time in office.

Needs-based funding for schools was implemented, spending on technical colleges (including the construction of residential accommodation for students) was significantly increased, and special initiatives for the handicapped, Indigenous Australians, and isolated children were introduced. Farmers benefited from tariff cuts and additional markets established by the Whitlam government's trade and diplomatic initiatives, together with higher spending on regional education and health, rural research, and other upgraded country facilities. A restructuring of agricultural spending was also carried out that (according to one study) “enabled assistance to be directed where it was most needed.” A number of measures were also undertaken to enhance women's rights. International conventions on equal pay, discrimination, and the political rights of women were ratified. New health centres and many women's refuges were established throughout Australia, together with a pre-school and child care program which catered for 100,000 children.

In March 1973, the service pension was extended to war widows, and in September 1973 the means test on service pensions was abolished for recipients over the age of 74. In May 1975 the means test was abolished for the age group 70–74 years. Free artificial limbs were also made available through the repatriation artificial limb and appliance centre to all amputees, while free medical and hospital treatment was introduced for veterans of both the Great War and the Boer War and for ex-prisoners of war. The Mental Health and Related Community Services Act of 1973 made grants available to the states for the provision of community-oriented services for drug, alcohol, and mental problems. In 1973, the age limit of 21 years was removed for the payment of additional pension for full-time students and for the payment of guardian's allowance or mother's allowance, and provision was made for payment of additional benefit for a child to continue after their 16th birthday and without limitation on age if the child was a dependent full-time student.

The government introduced reforms for the superannuation arrangements of its own employees. In July 1973, for instance, the government financed element of pensions was properly indexed against changes in the cost of living for the first time. In August 1973, fair rent provisions for houses and flats were introduced, while a separate housing list for in need families was introduced. In 1974, a generous rental rebate scheme and improved concessions on government loans were introduced to benefit low income earners. Funds were provided to improve the education of handicapped children, while money was also made available for upgrading accommodation in homeless persons' centres, while finance was also made available to centres on a pro rata basis for the provision of meals and accommodation. An Office of Women's Affairs was established to help women achieve equality, while the Legal Aid Office was set up to provide legal representation for those who could not afford it. The Trade Practices Act, passed in 1974, was aimed at promoting competition in the economy and to improve consumer safeguards. Funding on the arts was doubled, and both FM radio and radio station 2JJ were introduced, the latter in Sydney as part of a plan for a national youth radio network.

A number of amendments to the Conciliation and Arbitration Act were also made. The Act was revised to require the democratic control of unions by their rank-and-file members, to require that a union's rules should provide for full participation of its members in its affairs, and prohibited the dismissal of an elected official "unless he is found guilty of misappropriation of funds, gross misbehaviour or gross neglect of duty". The Act was also revised to prevent returning officers from rejecting a defective nomination "without giving the candidate seven days in which to correct the defect", to debar union officials from rejecting a rival's nomination for office, and to prohibit a union official or employee "being appointed as that union’s returning officer".

Tariffs for farming implements and equipment were reduced, and farm incomes more than trebled during Whitlam's time in office. In 1973, a payment of emergency adjustment assistance was initiated to benefit canning-fruit growers and growers of pears and apples, while the Dairy Adjustment Act of 1974 provided generous assistance for financially unsound dairy farms. A number of environmental measures were also implemented by the Whitlam government. In 1974, the Environment Protection (Impact of Proposals) Act was passed, which was the first piece of Commonwealth legislation to specifically address environmental issues, and set up procedures to review the environmental impact of development proposals which involved Commonwealth Government decisions. In 1973, the federal government awarded $100,000 in grants to environmental centres throughout Australia, the first action of its kind in Australia. In 1975, the Australian National Parks and Wildlife Conservation Act was passed, which allowed for the establishment of the Australian National Parks and Wildlife Service.

The Supporting Mother's Benefit was introduced in 1973 to alleviate financial deprivation among women whose de facto husbands were in jail, deserted de facto wives, unmarried mothers and other wives separated from their husbands who, for other reasons, were not eligible for the widows' pension. The Double Orphans' pension was introduced that same year, providing $10 a week to the guardian of an orphan who had lost both parents. The Handicapped Children's Allowance, introduced a year later, provided $10 a week to the guardians of severely physically or mentally handicapped children who had not been placed in an institution. A special discretionary benefit was introduced for lone fathers in August 1974, payable at the unemployment benefit rate. In February 1973, eligibility for the standard rate of pension, payable to widow pensioners with children and single age and invalid pensioners, was extended to Class B widow pensioners (those over the age of fifty with no dependent children). A change was also made ensuring that pensioners would not lose their extra benefits when a student turned twenty-one. The standard age pension rate was increased from 19.5% of average weekly earnings in September 1972 to 24.4% by December 1975. Social welfare administration was also made more efficient and equitable via the establishment of a Social Welfare Commission and benefit appeals tribunals.

The sales tax on artificial contraceptives was removed, while grants were made for family planning organisations. Maternity leave provisions for the Public Service were introduced consistent with the requirements of ILO Convention No. 103 – Maternity Provisions (Revised), 1952. The Aged or Disabled Persons' Homes Bill of 1974 increased the Federal subsidy for aged persons' homes from two dollars for every dollar provided by a non-profit or local government association to four dollars, while also extending the provisions of the Aged Persons' Homes Act of 1954 to handicapped adults. The Handicapped Persons' Assistance Act of 1974 extended the government's program of assistance to voluntary organisations responsible for the welfare of handicapped people. While spending on education increased from 4.83% of GDP in 1972–73 to 6.18% in 1974–75, the Federal government's share of funding went up from 22.6% in 1972–73 to 42.5% in 1975–76. The Defence Service Homes Act of 1973 extended eligibility for a loan to current servicemen who had not served overseas but who had served for more than three years, to those who had served overseas under the banner of recognised welfare organisations, and to certain unmarried females with qualifying service. In addition, the maximum loan available under the scheme was increased from $9000 to $12000. For veterans, an expanded system of repatriation benefits was introduced, together with improved resettlement allowances, wider eligibility for defence service housing loans, a $1000 free-tax bonus for re-engagements, an attractive new retirement and death benefit scheme, and a more generous system of remuneration.

The Whitlam government also sought to extend to Federal public servants the conditions that their state counterparts had long enjoyed. Among the benefits that the Whitlam government introduced for federal public servants included a reduction in the qualifying time for long-service leave from 15 to 10 years, the removal of job discrimination provisions against women, ample redundancy provisions, a minimum of 12 weeks paid maternity leave with six weeks of paid leave following confinement, one week of paid paternity leave for any employee required to stay at home to care for his wife during or following her confinement, and entitlement to four weeks of annual leave with a 17.5% loading. The government also financed a wide range of new local government programs through the State, including tourism, urban transport, national estate, leisure facilities, sewerage backlog, flood mitigation, area improvement, growth centres, and senior citizens' centres. Outlays on Aboriginal affairs programs were significantly increased with expenditure rising in real terms by 254.6% for legal aid, employment by 350.9%, education by 97.1%, health by 234.6%, and housing by 103.7%. The Australian Citizenship Act of 1973 established Australian citizenship for the first time on the basis of "one criteria,[sic] one national allegiance, one citizenship and one ceremony," while the Roads Grants Act 1974 provided funds for the building of rural arterial roads, urban arterial roads, minor traffic engineering and road safety improvements, rural local roads, developmental roads, urban local roads and beef roads.

In 1973, an improved scheme of allowances was introduced to assist parents of children who did not have reasonable access to school services as a result of their geographic location. The quality of health care in rural areas was also improved via the development of a regional hospitals program and promotion of community-based health services. The Trade Union Training Authority Act of 1975 set up a national college and state centres designed to educate trade union leaders in various aspects of industrial relations. The Commonwealth Secondary Scholarship Scheme was replaced by a system of secondary allowances which were made available on the basis of financial need. An isolated children's allowance was introduced to compensate the educational disadvantages faced by children living in remote parts of the country. Greater spending was allocated to the arts, while spending on urban and regional development was accelerated, which contributed to a significant rise in the number of Australian households connected to a sewerage services. A School Dental Service Scheme was also introduced, providing free dental care for schoolchildren. Via grants to the states, the Whitlam government funded the construction of 18,500 homes for low income earners from 1973 to 1975.

Various measures were also introduced to enhance educational opportunities. A disadvantaged school program was introduced that provided additional financial assistance for more than 1,000 schools whose students suffered special socio-economic disadvantages. In 1973, capital funds and assistance with running costs were made available for the education of handicapped children while a large training program was initiated for teachers and basic training and research financed for the area of special education. A program of innovative educational projects was successful in providing parents, teachers, and community groups with the first opportunity to try out their ideas for improving education. Over 1,000 projects were funded, ranging from bee-keeping and remedial reading to computers, while a network of educational innovators was set up to exchange experiences and to provide mutual support among people who wanted to be active in improving schools. In 1975, the quality of school curricula was enhanced by the establishment of the Curriculum Development Centre. For those in higher education, the Commonwealth Scholarship Scheme was abolished and replaced by the Tertiary Education Assistance Scheme, which offered means-tested and non-competitive financial assistance for all tertiary students.

Initiatives were introduced to assist teacher training. Following the delivery of a report by the Special Committee on Teacher Education in March 1973, the Whitlam government introduced various measures to implement its recommendations for special grants to the States for the building of teachers' college libraries, fostering research into teacher education, increasing the number of students training to become teachers for handicapped children, and improving facilities in existing colleges of advanced education. The States Grants (Advanced Education) Act (No. 3) 1973 allocated $188 million for the development of teacher education in pre-school teachers' colleges, state teachers' colleges, and colleges of advanced education throughout 1973–75, while the States Grants (Advanced Education) Act of 1974 provided recurrent financial assistance for non-government teachers' colleges for 1974 and 1975. The first national program for technical and further education resulted from the recommendations of the Committee on Technical and Further Education, established in early 1973. This committee produced an interim report in April 1974 which led to the payment of capital and recurrent grants to the states for building and planning new technical colleges and improving facilities at existing ones, especially with respect to teacher training, library services, research facilities, and student accommodation. The sum total of federal grants increased from $18.1 million in 1972–73 to $81.1 million in 1975–76. Expenditure on state government schools increased more than sixfold, and more than doubled on non-government schools.

The death penalty for federal crimes was also abolished. Legal Aid was established, with offices in each state capital. It abolished tertiary school (university) fees, and established the Schools Commission to allocate funds to schools. Whitlam founded the Department of Urban Development and, having lived in developing Cabramatta when it was largely unsewered, set a goal to leave no urban home unsewered.

The new government gave grants directly to local government units for urban renewal, flood prevention, and the promotion of tourism. Other federal grants financed highways linking the state capitals, and paid for standard-gauge rail lines between the states. The government created a new city at Albury-Wodonga on the New South Wales-Victoria border. "Advance Australia Fair" became the country's national anthem, in preference to "God Save the Queen". The Order of Australia replaced the British honours system in early 1975.

Resources were also allocated towards a program for migrants. In August 1973, an Immigration (Education) Act was introduced to provide (as an emergency measure under the child migrant education program) supplementary class-room accommodation in schools with special programs for migrant children. In 1973–74, the number of teachers for special migrant classes increased from 1,000 to 1,500 and the number of children receiving instruction went up from 40,000 to 60,000. Migrant education centres were established in Brisbane, Perth, Adelaide, Melbourne, and Sydney, while a home tutoring scheme was established, designed to instruct migrant women in the English language. In migrant communities in all the states, 48 multilingual welfare officers were employed to overcome the social isolation of underprivileged groups. Portable benefit rights were also introduced, with respect to age, invalid, wives' and widows' pensions. Whereas under previous arrangements a pensioner had to live in Australia for 20 years after reaching the age of 16 and only had portability rights in Malta, Turkey, Greece, and Italy, the new provisions allowed a person drawing a pension to take up that benefit anywhere in the world after 10 years of Australian residence in the case of an age pension and after 5 years for most invalid pensions, while no period of residence was required for widows permanently resident in Australia when their husbands died. The voting age was also lowered to eighteen. During its last year in office, the Whitlam government carried out measures such as the introduction of a national employment and training scheme, the first no fault divorce procedure in the world via the Family Law Act 1975, and a welfare payment for homeless Australians. In the field of communications, the Whitlam government removed the limitations on the amount of non-English-language programming on radio and television and established the experimental ethnic radio stations 2EA in Sydney and 3EA in Melbourne. In addition, emergency telephone interpreter services were initiated in all community languages. 382 capital projects were also launched, while scholarships were provided to 1700 preschool teachers.

Whitlam was a vocal advocate for Indigenous rights. His government created the Aboriginal Land Fund to help Indigenous groups buy back privately owned lands. The Aboriginal Loans Commission was initiated to assist Indigenous Australians with the purchase of property with a view to home ownership, as well as to help establish Indigenous-owned businesses and pay for health and education expenses. A number of other initiatives were carried out to improve socio-economic conditions for First Nations Australians. The rate of training Aboriginal teachers and teachers' aides was increased, while the Aboriginal Secondary Grants Scheme was introduced to provide allowances to all students of Aboriginal descent attending secondary schools. An Aboriginal Study Grants Scheme was introduced to assist Aboriginal students in tertiary education institutions, while a scheme was introduced for Aboriginal children living in Aboriginal communities to receive primary school instruction in their own language and in their traditional arts and crafts. To grant First Nations Australians fairer representation within the legal system, the Whitlam government significantly expanded the terms of the Aboriginal Legal Service established in 1970. $7.8 million was allocated between 1973 and 1976 to establish 25 offices throughout the country which provided free legal aid to Aborigines irrespective of the seriousness of the case. The offices had a majority of Indigenous Australians on their governing bodies and, as a result, were integrated into local Aboriginal communities and provided trustworthy and effective legal representation. In addition, a change was made whereby Indigenous Australians no longer needed to acquire permission to leave the country.

Outlays on Aboriginal affairs programs were considerably increased, with expenditure increasing from $61.44 million in 1972–73 to $185.79 million in 1975–76, representing a real increase of 105.8%. Expenditure in real terms went up by 254.6% for legal aid, 350.9% for employment, 97.1% for education, 234.6% for health, and 103.7% for housing. Federal grants to the States for the purpose of Aboriginal health care increased from $4.4 million in 1972–73 to $21.5 million in 1975–76. An Aboriginal Health Service was set up, whereby health and social workers were trained to provide community-based services either at local clinics or as mobile teams in the field. According to Whitlam, this initiative was successful "in eliminating the barriers that exist between Aborigines and primary health institutions". The Housing Society Scheme allowed Aboriginal communities to formulate their own budgets in spending departmental grants (taking into account the importance of Indigenous Australians determining their own housing needs), and by June 1975 over 100 housing societies had been set up and 450 houses had been completed under the scheme. The Aboriginal Loans Commission was set up in December 1974 to make personal and housing loans to First Nations Australians at a discounted rate of interest, and encouraged the incidence of Aboriginal home ownership while helping to overcome discrimination in finance markets whereby Aborigines with steady employment and incomes were often refused loans for reasons related to their race. In June 1973, the Whitlam government set up Aboriginal Hostels Limited as a public enterprise designed to provide the Aboriginal population with essential and urgent accommodation. By 1975, 74 hostels had been set up, with a combined capacity of 1,677 beds.

Federal grants to schools also went up sixfold, while existing study grants for Aboriginal children were extended and a wide-ranging scholarship scheme according to need was established for handicapped and isolated children. The residence test that applied to invalid pension was also abolished (as noted by one study) “for persons whose permanent incapacity or blindness occurred in Australia.” Also, by early 1975, the standard rate of pension went up by 80% and the combined married rate by nearly 74%. Various changes were also made to unemployment and sickness benefit rates. In 1973, a married rate of unemployment benefit as introduced, while in March 1975 eligibility for additional benefits was extended to children 16 years and over in full-time education. On 1 November that year, a special rate for single recipients under the age of 18 was introduced.

After visiting the then Australian colony of Papua and New Guinea as opposition leader in 1970 and 1971 and calling for self-governance. This was granted in late 1973, before full Independence was legislated in September 1975, creating the Independent State of Papua New Guinea, ending Australia's time as a coloniser.

In 1973, the National Gallery of Australia, then called the Australian National Gallery, bought the painting Blue Poles by 20th-century artist Jackson Pollock for US$2 million (A$1.3 million at the time of payment)—about a third of its annual budget. This required Whitlam's personal permission, which he gave on the condition the price was publicised. In the conservative climate of the time, the purchase created a political and media scandal, and was said to symbolise either Whitlam's foresight and vision, or his profligate spending.

Whitlam travelled extensively as prime minister, and was the first Australian prime minister to visit China while in office. He was criticised for this travel, especially after Cyclone Tracy struck Darwin; he interrupted an extensive tour of Europe for 48 hours (deemed too brief a period by many) to view the devastation.

=== Early troubles ===
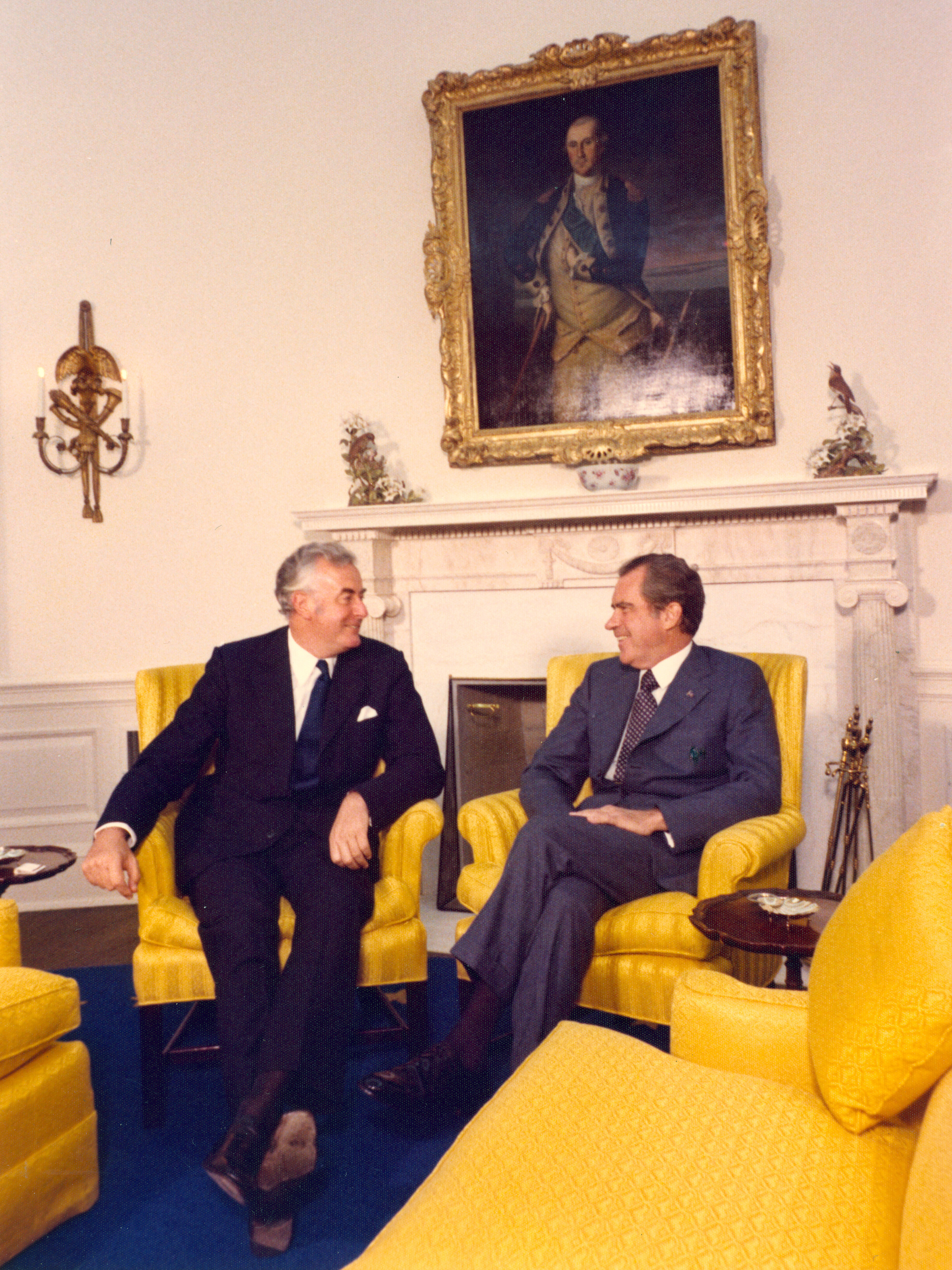
Whitlam visits US President Richard Nixon, July 1973.

In February 1973, the attorney-general, Senator Lionel Murphy, led a police raid on the Melbourne office of the Australian Security Intelligence Organisation, which was under his ministerial responsibility. Murphy believed that ASIO might have files relating to domestic Croatian terrorist threats against Yugoslav Prime Minister Džemal Bijedić, who was about to visit Australia, and feared ASIO might conceal or destroy them. The Opposition attacked the Government over the raid, terming Murphy a "loose cannon". A Senate investigation of the incident was cut short when Parliament dissolved in 1974. According to journalist and author Wallace Brown, the controversy over the raid continued to dog the Whitlam government throughout its term because the incident was "so silly".

From the start of the Whitlam government, the Opposition, led by Billy Snedden (who replaced McMahon as Liberal leader in December 1972) sought to use control of the Senate to baulk Whitlam. It did not seek to block all government legislation; the Coalition senators, led by Senate Liberal leader Reg Withers, sought to block government legislation only when the obstruction would advance the Opposition's agenda. The Whitlam government also had numerous problems and issues in relations with the states. New South Wales refused the government's request that it close the Rhodesian Information Centre in Sydney. The Queensland premier, Joh Bjelke-Petersen, refused to consider any adjustment in Queensland's border with Papua New Guinea, which, due to the state's ownership of islands in the Torres Strait, came within half a kilometre (about one-third of a mile) of the Papuan mainland. Liberal state governments in New South Wales and Victoria were re-elected by large margins in 1973. Whitlam and his majority in the House of Representatives proposed a constitutional referendum in December 1973, transferring control of wages and prices from the states to the Federal government. The two propositions failed to attract a majority of voters in any state, and were rejected by over 800,000 votes nationwide.

Labor had come to office during a period of improvement for Australia's economic outlook, with rural industries performing well, unemployment falling, production increasing and a boom in foreign investment and exports. Nevertheless, signs of increasing inflation and slow private business investment portended looming economic troubles, leading to the 1973–75 recession and the 1973 oil crisis. According to political historian Brian Carroll, the Whitlam government chose in its 1973–4 budget to "put major emphasis on the Party's social objectives rather than on moderating the obvious expansionary trends in the economy" and the budget substantially increased direct government spending and increased redistribution of income through welfare.

By early 1974, the Senate had rejected nineteen government bills, ten of them twice. With a half-Senate election due by midyear, Whitlam looked for ways to shore up support in that body. Queensland Senator and former DLP leader Vince Gair signalled his willingness to leave the Senate for a diplomatic post. With five Queensland seats at stake in the half-Senate election, the ALP would probably win only two, but if six were at stake, the party would most likely win three. Possible control of the Senate was therefore at stake; Whitlam agreed to Gair's request and had the governor-general Sir Paul Hasluck appoint him Ambassador to Ireland. Word leaked of Gair's pending resignation, and Whitlam's opponents attempted to counteract his manoeuvre. On what became known as the "Night of the Long Prawns", Country Party members entertained Gair at a small party in the office of Senator Ron Maunsell, to delay him visiting the Senate President to tender his resignation. As Gair enjoyed beer and prawns, Bjelke-Petersen advised the Queensland governor, Sir Colin Hannah, to issue writs for only the usual five vacancies, since Gair's seat was not yet vacant, effectively countering Whitlam's plan.

With the Opposition threatening to disrupt supply, or block the appropriation bills, Whitlam used the Senate's defeat of several bills twice to trigger a double dissolution election, holding it instead of the half-Senate election it had already announced. After a campaign featuring the Labor slogan "Give Gough a fair go", the Whitlam government was returned, with its majority in the House of Representatives cut from seven to five. Both Government and Opposition secured 29 seats in the Senate, with the balance of power held by two independents. The deadlock over the twice-rejected bills was broken, uniquely in Australian history, with a special joint sitting of the two houses of Parliament under Section 57 of the Constitution. This session, authorised by the new governor-general, Sir John Kerr, passed bills providing for universal health insurance (known then as Medibank, today as Medicare) and providing the Northern Territory and Australian Capital Territory with representation in the Senate, effective at the next election.

== Second term ==
=== 1974 ===
By mid-1974, Australia was in an economic slump. The 1973 oil crisis had caused prices to spike and, according to government figures, inflation topped 13 percent for over a year between 1973 and 1974. Part of the inflation was due to Whitlam's desire to increase wages and conditions of the Commonwealth Public Service as a pacesetter for the private sector. The Whitlam government had cut tariffs by 25 percent in 1973; 1974 saw an increase in imports of 30 percent and a $1.5 billion increase in the trade deficit. Primary producers of commodities such as beef were caught in a credit squeeze as short-term rates rose to extremely high levels. Unemployment also rose significantly. Unease within the ALP led to Barnard's defeat when Jim Cairns challenged him for his deputy leadership. Whitlam gave little help to his embattled deputy, who had formed the other half of the duumvirate.

Again, in the 1974–75 budget, the government emphasised its social objectives, with Treasurer Frank Crean saying that its "overriding objective is to get on with various initiatives in the fields of education, health, social welfare and urban improvements". According to Carroll, most economic observers agreed "there was little in the budget likely to arrest what they saw as the alarming drift in the economic climate". By 1974, inflation had worsened and Australia had entered the 1973–75 recession and suffered through the 1973 oil crisis. Unemployment reached 5% (at that time considered high).

Despite these economic indicators, the budget presented in August 1974 saw large increases in spending, especially in education. Treasury officials had advised a series of tax and fee increases, ranging from excise taxes to the cost of posting a letter; their advice was mostly rejected by Cabinet. The budget was unsuccessful in dealing with the inflation and unemployment, and Whitlam introduced large tax cuts in November. He also announced additional spending to help the private sector.

In August, the government launched the Royal Commission on Intelligence and Security, led by Justice Robert Marsden Hope, to investigate the Australian Intelligence Community and, especially, the Australian Security Intelligence Organisation.

The budget presented on 17 September 1974 included a 173% increase for urban and regional development, a 30% increase for health, and a 78% increase for education. In addition, a revised income-tax scale reduced tax payable for people on incomes less than $10,500 a year. The 1975 budget provided funding for the new Medibank health scheme, together with a 2% increase in education, a 5% increase in urban and regional development, a 15% real increase in social security expenditure, and a restructuring of personal income tax.

Women's Adviser Elizabeth Reid was convenor of the Australian National Advisory Committee for International Women's Year (IWY), and also undertook roles related to IWY that involved travel to New York and Mexico. At home, she secured funding for promoting and celebrating IWY, which led to accusations of extravagant governmental spending, particularly aimed at her. Men in Whitlam's office told him that she was a political liability. After being asked to move out of the Prime Minister's Office and instead lead a women's section in the public service, she resigned.

Following the 1974–75 budget, Whitlam removed Frank Crean as Treasurer, replacing him with deputy prime minister Jim Cairns. Cairns's reputation took an early blow with media coverage of the appointment of Junie Morosi as his private secretary, a woman with no prior treasury or public service experience, and with whom he engaged in an extramarital affair. Cairns then misled parliament over the Loans Affair and was in turn replaced by Bill Hayden before having a chance to bring down his first budget. According to Brian Carroll, Hayden "presented a budget more in keeping with the established notion that it was an instrument of economic management rather than of social reform", however by the time Hayden reached the Treasury portfolio "the Whitlam government's political troubles were beginning to overtake it".

=== Final months ===
Whitlam appointed Senator Murphy to the High Court, even though Murphy's Senate seat would not be up for election if a half-Senate election were held. Labor then held three of the five short-term New South Wales Senate seats. Under proportional representation, Labor could hold its three short term seats in the next half-Senate election, but if Murphy's seat were also contested, Labor was unlikely to win four out of six. Thus, a Murphy appointment meant the almost certain loss of a seat in the closely divided Senate at the next election. Whitlam appointed Murphy anyway. By convention, senators appointed by the state legislature to fill casual vacancies were from the same political party as the former senator. The New South Wales premier, Tom Lewis felt that this convention only applied to vacancies caused by deaths or ill-health, and arranged for the legislature to elect Cleaver Bunton, former mayor of Albury and an independent.

By March 1975, many Liberal parliamentarians felt that Snedden was doing an inadequate job as Leader of the Opposition, and that Whitlam was dominating him in the House of Representatives. Malcolm Fraser challenged Snedden for the leadership, and defeated him on 21 March.

Soon after Fraser's accession, controversy arose over the Whitlam government's actions in trying to restart peace talks in Vietnam. As the North prepared to end the civil war, Whitlam sent cables to both Vietnamese governments, telling Parliament that both cables were substantially the same. The Opposition contended he had misled Parliament, and a motion to censure Whitlam was defeated along party lines. The Opposition also attacked Whitlam for not allowing enough South Vietnamese refugees into Australia, with Fraser calling for the entry of 50,000. Freudenberg alleges that 1,026 Vietnamese refugees entered Australia in the final eight months of the Whitlam government, and only 399 in 1976 under Fraser. However, by 1977, Australia had accepted over five thousand refugees.

As the political situation deteriorated, Whitlam and his government continued to enact legislation: The Family Law Act 1975 provided for no-fault divorce while the Racial Discrimination Act 1975 caused Australia to ratify United Nations conventions against racial discrimination that Australia had signed under Holt, but which had never been ratified. In August 1975, Whitlam gave the Gurindji people of the Northern Territory title deeds to part of their traditional lands, beginning the process of Aboriginal land reform. The next month, Australia granted independence to Papua New Guinea.

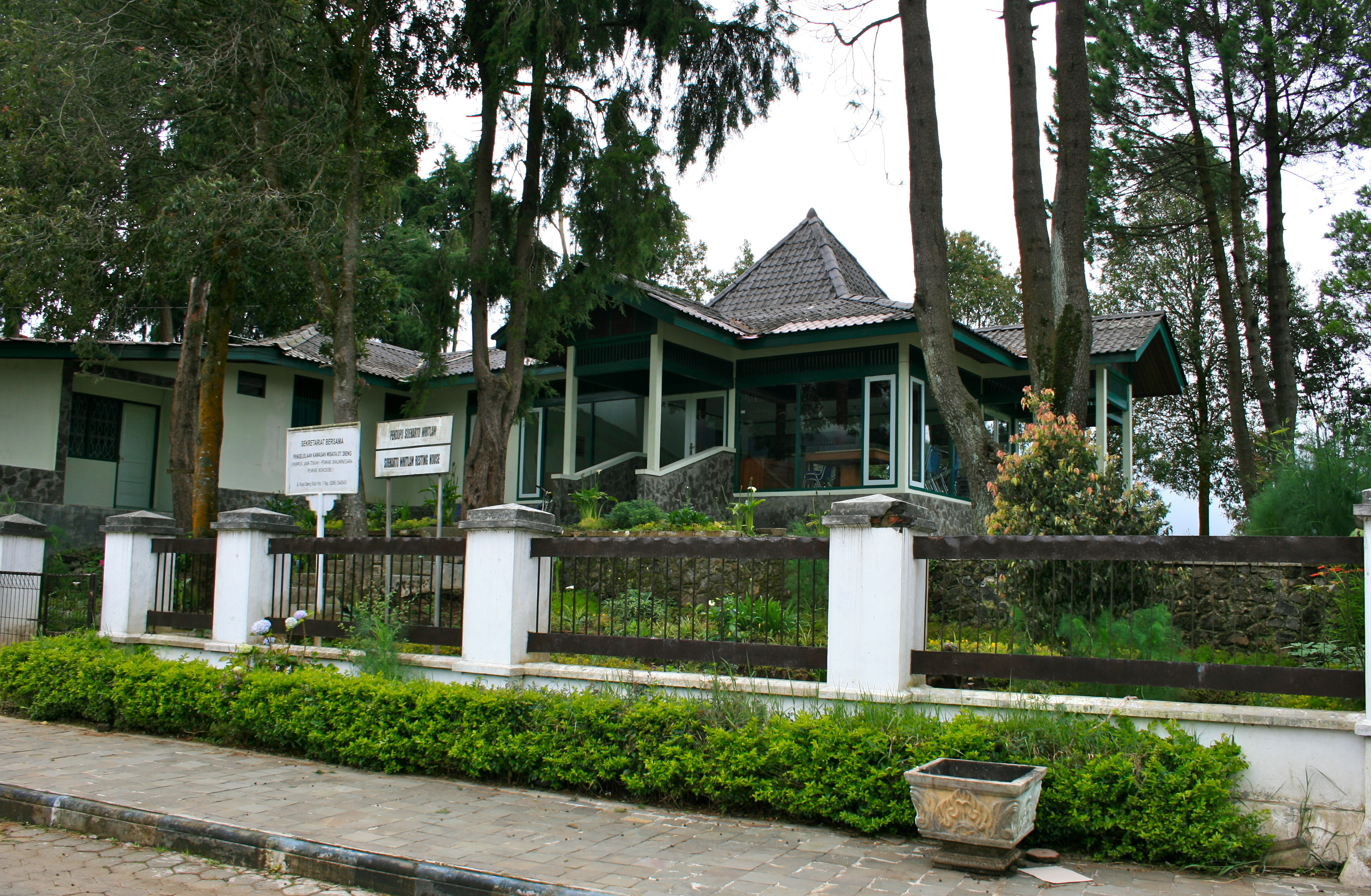
The Suharto-Whitlam House in Dieng Plateau, Indonesia where Whitlam discussed the future of East Timor with Indonesian President, Suharto, in 1974

Following the 1974 Carnation Revolution, Portugal began a process of decolonisation and began a withdrawal from Portuguese Timor (later East Timor). Australians had long taken an interest in the colony; the nation had sent troops to the region during World War II, and many East Timorese had fought the Japanese as guerrillas. In September 1974, Whitlam met with Indonesian president, Suharto, in Indonesia and indicated that he would support Indonesia if it annexed East Timor. At the height of the Cold War and with American retreat from Indo-China, he felt that if incorporated into Indonesia, the region would be more stable, and Australia would not risk having the East Timorese FRETILIN movement, which many feared was communist, come to power. Whitlam says that he forcefully told Indonesian president Suharto that the East Timorese were entitled to decide the colony's fate through self-determination. Indonesia invaded East Timor in December 1975, and occupied it until the 1999 vote for independence.

Whitlam had offered Barnard a diplomatic post; in early 1975 Barnard agreed to this, triggering the 1975 Bass by-election in his Tasmanian electorate. The election on 28 June proved a disaster for Labor, which lost the seat with a swing against it of 17 percent. The next week, Whitlam fired Barnard's successor as deputy prime minister, Cairns, who had misled Parliament regarding the Loans Affair amid innuendo about his relationship with his office manager, Junie Morosi. At the time of Cairns' dismissal, one Senate seat was vacant, following the death on 30 June of Queensland ALP Senator Bertie Milliner. The state Labor party nominated Mal Colston, resulting in a deadlock. The unicameral Queensland legislature twice voted against Colston, and the party refused to submit any alternative candidates. Bjelke-Petersen finally convinced the legislature to elect a low-level union official, Albert Field, who had contacted his office and expressed a willingness to serve. In interviews, Field made it clear he would not support Whitlam. Field was expelled from the ALP for standing against Colston, and Labor senators boycotted his swearing-in. Whitlam argued that, because of the manner of filling vacancies, the Senate was "corrupted" and "tainted", with the Opposition enjoying a majority they did not win at the ballot box.

=== Loans Affair ===
Minerals and Energy Minister Rex Connor wanted funds for a series of national development projects. He proposed that to finance his plans, the government should borrow $US 4 billion (at that time a huge sum of money). It was a requirement of the Australian Constitution that non-temporary government borrowings must be through the Loan Council. Although the development projects were long-term, Whitlam, together with ministers Cairns, Murphy and Connor authorised Connor to seek the loan on 13 December 1974, without involving the Loan Council. Connor had already been investigating the loan. Through an Adelaide builder, he had been introduced to Pakistani dealer Tirath Khemlani. According to Khemlani, Connor asked for a 20-year loan with interest at 7.7% and set a commission to Khemlani of 2.5%. Despite assurance that all was in order, Khemlani began to stall on the loan, notably after he was asked to go to Zurich with officials of the Reserve Bank of Australia to prove that the funds were in the Union Bank of Switzerland as he had claimed. The government revised its authority to Connor to $2 billion.

As news leaked of the plan, the Opposition began questioning the Government. Under questioning from Fraser, Whitlam said on 20 May that the loans pertained to "matters of energy", that the Loans Council had not been advised, and that it would be advised only "if and when the loan is made". The following day he told Fraser and Parliament that authority for the plan had been revoked. On 4 June 1975, the Treasurer and deputy prime minister, Jim Cairns, misled Parliament by claiming that he had not given a letter to an intermediary offering a 2.5% commission on a loan. Whitlam removed Cairns from Treasury and made him Minister for the environment, before dismissing him from Cabinet.

While the Loans Affair never resulted in an actual loan, according to author and Whitlam speechwriter Graham Freudenberg, "The only cost involved was the cost to the reputation of the Government. That cost was to be immense—it was government itself."

The Affair ultimately gave new Liberal leader Malcolm Fraser the perceived justification he needed to block supply of budget Bills in the Senate, with the aim of forcing Whitlam to an election.

== Constitutional crisis ==
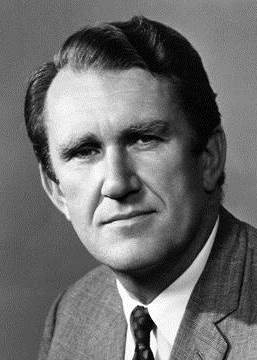
Malcolm Fraser

In October 1975, the Opposition, led by Fraser, determined to block supply by deferring consideration of appropriation bills. With Field on leave (his Senate appointment having been challenged), the Coalition had an effective majority of 30–29 in the Senate. The Coalition believed that if Whitlam could not deliver supply, and would not advise new elections, Kerr would have to dismiss him. Supply would run out on 30 November.

The stakes were raised in the conflict on 10 October, when the High Court declared valid the Act granting the territories two senators each. In a half-Senate election, most successful candidates would not take their places until 1 July 1976, but the territorial senators, and those filling Field's and Bunton's seats, would assume their seats at once. This gave Labor an outside chance of controlling the Senate, at least up until 1 July 1976. On 14 October, Labor minister Rex Connor, mastermind of the loans scheme, was forced to resign when Khemlani released documents showing that Connor had made misleading statements. The continuing scandal confirmed the Coalition in their stance that they would not concede supply. Whitlam on the other hand, convinced that he would win the battle, was glad of the distraction from the Loans Affair, and believed that he would "smash" not only the Senate, but Fraser's leadership as well.

Whitlam told the House of Representatives on 21 October,

Let me place my government's position clearly on the record. I shall not advise the Governor-General to hold an election for the House of Representatives on behalf of the Senate. I shall tender no advice for an election of either House or both Houses until this constitutional issue is settled. This government, so long as it retains a majority in the House of Representatives, will continue the course endorsed by the Australian people last year.

Whitlam and his ministers repeatedly warned that the Opposition was damaging not only the Constitution, but Australia's economic position as well. The Coalition senators tried to remain united, as several became increasingly concerned about the tactic of blocking supply. As the crisis dragged into November, Whitlam attempted to make arrangements for public servants and suppliers to be able to cash cheques at banks. These transactions would be temporary loans which the government would repay once supply was restored.

Governor-general Kerr was following the crisis closely. At a luncheon with Whitlam and several of his ministers on 30 October, Kerr suggested a compromise: if Fraser conceded supply, Whitlam would agree not to call the half-Senate election until May or June 1976, or alternatively would agree not to call the Senate into session until after 1 July. Whitlam rejected the idea, seeking to end the Senate's right to deny supply. On 3 November, after a meeting with Kerr, Fraser proposed that if the government agreed to hold a House of Representatives election at the same time as the half-Senate election, the Coalition would concede supply. Whitlam rejected this offer, stating that he had no intention of advising a House election for at least a year.

With the crisis unresolved, on 6 November, Kerr decided to dismiss Whitlam as prime minister. Fearing that Whitlam would go to the Queen and have him removed, Kerr did not give Whitlam any hint of what was coming. He conferred (against Whitlam's advice) with High Court Chief Justice Sir Garfield Barwick, who agreed that he had the power to dismiss Whitlam.

A meeting among the party leaders, including Whitlam and Fraser, to resolve the crisis on the morning of 11 November came to nothing. Kerr and Whitlam met at the governor-general's office that afternoon at 1.00 pm. Unknown to Whitlam, Fraser was waiting in an ante-room; Whitlam later stated that he would not have set foot in the building if he had known Fraser was there. Whitlam, as he had told Kerr by phone earlier that day, came prepared to advise a half-Senate election, to be held on 13 December. Kerr instead told Whitlam that he had terminated his commission as prime minister, and handed him a letter to that effect. After the conversation, Whitlam returned to the prime minister's residence, The Lodge, had lunch and conferred with his advisers. Immediately after his meeting with Whitlam, Kerr commissioned Fraser as caretaker prime minister, on the assurance he could obtain supply and would then advise Kerr to dissolve both houses for election.

In the confusion, Whitlam and his advisers did not immediately tell any Senate members of the dismissal, with the result that when the Senate convened at 2.00 pm, the appropriation bills were rapidly passed, with the ALP senators assuming the Opposition had given in. The bills were soon sent to Kerr to receive Royal Assent. At 2.34 pm, ten minutes after supply had been secured, Fraser rose in the House and announced he was prime minister. He promptly suffered a series of defeats in the House, which instructed the speaker, Gordon Scholes, to advise Kerr to reinstate Whitlam.

By the time Kerr received Scholes, Parliament had been dissolved by proclamation. Kerr's Official Secretary, David Smith came to Parliament House to proclaim the dissolution from the front steps. A large, angry crowd had gathered, and Smith was nearly drowned out by their noise. He concluded with the traditional "God save the Queen". Former prime minister Whitlam, who had been standing behind Smith, then addressed the crowd:

Well may we say "God save the Queen", because nothing will save the Governor-General! The Proclamation which you have just heard read by the Governor-General's Official Secretary was countersigned Malcolm Fraser, who will undoubtedly go down in Australian history from Remembrance Day 1975 as Kerr's cur. They won't silence the outskirts of Parliament House, even if the inside has been silenced for a few weeks... Maintain your rage and enthusiasm for the campaign for the election now to be held and until polling day.

== See also ==
- First Whitlam Ministry
- Second Whitlam Ministry
- Third Whitlam Ministry

== Bibliography ==
- Brown, Wallace (2002), Ten Prime Ministers: Life Among the Politicians, Longueville Books, ISBN 1-920681-04-3
- Cotton, James (2004), East Timor, Australia and Regional Order: Intervention and its Aftermath in Southeast Asia, Routledge, ISBN 0-415-33580-9
- Dunn, James (1996), Timor: A People Betrayed, Sydney: Australian Broadcasting Corporation, ISBN 0-7333-0537-7
- Freudenberg, Graham (2009), A Certain Grandeur: Gough Whitlam's Life in Politics (revised ed.), Viking, ISBN 978-0-670-07375-7
- Hocking, Jenny (2008), Gough Whitlam: A Moment in History, The Miegunyah Press, ISBN 978-0-522-85705-4
- Kelly, Paul (1983), The Dismissal, Angus & Robertson Publishers, ISBN 0-207-14860-0
- Kelly, Paul (1995), November 1975, Allen & Unwin, ISBN 1-86373-987-4
- Lloyd, Clem (2008), "Edward Gough Whitlam", in Grattan, Michelle (ed.), Australian Prime Ministers (revised ed.), New Holland Publishers Pty Ltd., pp. 324–354
- Reid, Alan (1976), The Whitlam Venture, Hill of Content, ISBN 0-85572-079-4
- Whitlam, Gough (1979), The Truth of the Matter, Allen Lane, ISBN 0-7139-1291-X
