= 1974 Australian federal election =

- 18 May 1974

All 127 seats of the House of Representatives 64 seats were needed for a majority in the House All 60 seats of the Senate
- Registered: 7,897,506 ▲11.64%
- Turnout: 7,535,768 (95.42%) (▲0.04 pp)
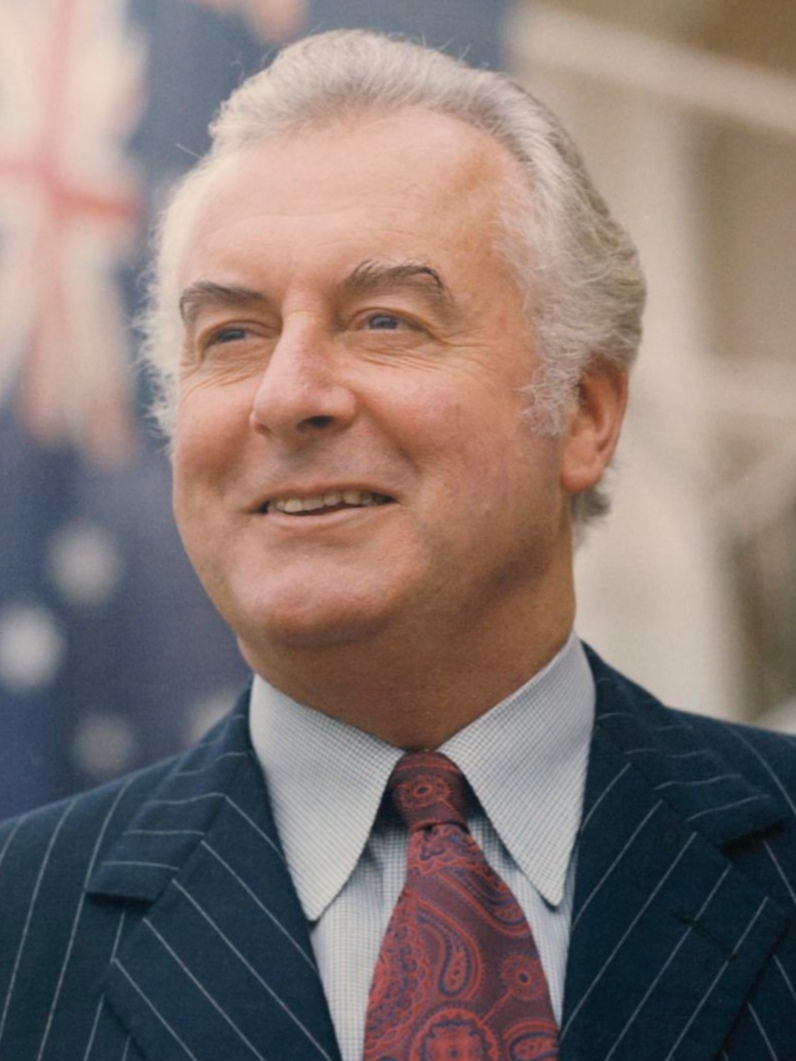

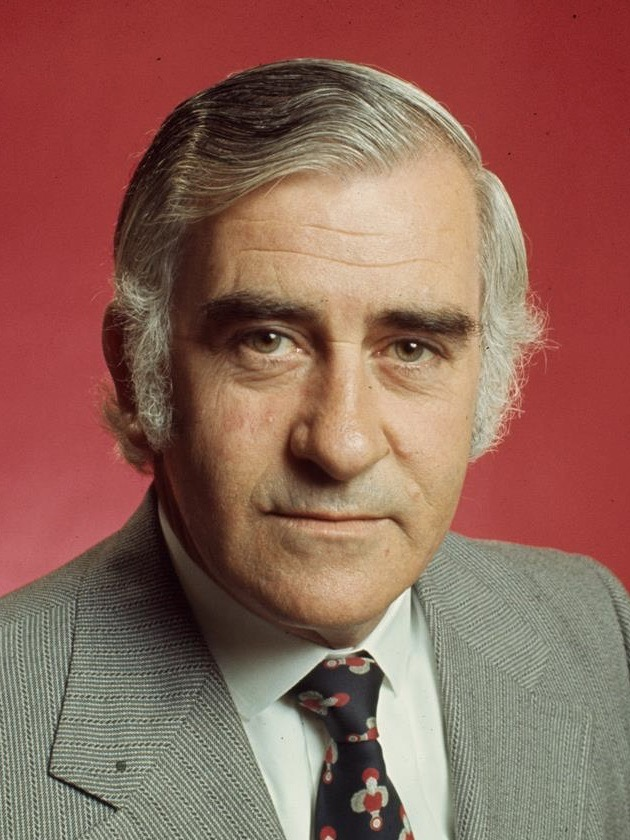
	First party	Second party
Leader	Gough Whitlam	Billy Snedden
Party	Labor	Liberal–Country Coalition
Leader since	8 February 1967	5 December 1972
Leader's seat	Werriwa (NSW)	Bruce (Vic.)
Last election	67 seats	58 seats
Seats won	66 seats	61 seats
Seat change	▼1	▲3
Primary vote	3,644,110	3,379,545
Percentage	49.30%	45.73%
Swing	▼0.29	▲4.25
TPP	51.70%	48.30%
TPP swing	▼1.00	▲1.00
- Results by division for the House of Representatives, shaded by winning party's margin of victory.
Prime Minister before election
Gough Whitlam
Labor
Subsequent Prime Minister
Gough Whitlam
Labor

A federal election was held in Australia on 18 May 1974. All 127 seats in the House of Representatives and all 60 seats in the Senate were up for election, due to a double dissolution. The incumbent Labor Party led by Prime Minister Gough Whitlam defeated the opposition Liberal–Country coalition led by Billy Snedden. This marked the first time that a Labor leader won two consecutive elections.

Prior to the election the voting age had been reduced from 21 to 18 years. The election was held in conjunction with four referendum questions, none of which were carried.

Future Prime Minister John Howard entered parliament at this election. Snedden became the first Liberal Leader not to serve as prime minister.

== Background and issues ==
Gough Whitlam had been an active prime minister since his party's victory in the 1972 election, and his government had pursued many socially progressive reforms and policies over its first term. However, it suffered through the 1973 oil crisis and the 1973–75 recession and received a hostile reception from the coalition/DLP-controlled Senate, with the last Senate election held in 1970.

Following an attempt by Whitlam to create an extra Senate vacancy in Queensland by appointing former Democratic Labor Party (DLP) Leader, Senator Vince Gair, as Ambassador to Ireland, Snedden announced that the opposition would block the Government's supply bills in the Senate. After a great deal of legalistic argumentation in both houses about the Gair Affair, and justified by the failure of six (non-supply) bills to pass the Senate, Whitlam requested and was granted by Governor-General Sir Paul Hasluck a double dissolution under section 57 of the Constitution. The already-announced election date of 18 May was kept. The election focused on Whitlam's first 1 1/2 years in office and whether the Australian public was willing to continue with his reform agenda.

== Electoral system ==
Members of the House of Representatives were elected one per division (electoral district) using full-preferential instant-runoff voting.

Senators were elected by single transferable vote and proportional representation. In states senators are elected from state-wide six-member districts, and in territories from territory-wide two-member districts. All candidates have to be ranked or the vote is rejected.

== Results ==
=== House of Representatives results ===
Government (66) Labor (66) Opposition (61) Coalition Liberal (40) Country (21)

House of Reps (IRV) – 1974–75 – Turnout 95.42% (CV) – Informal 1.92%
Party	First preference votes	%	Swing	Seats	Change
Labor	3,644,110	49.30	▼−0.29	66	−1
Liberal–Country coalition	3,379,545	45.73	▲+4.25	61	+3
Liberal	2,582,968	34.95	▲+2.91	40	+2
Country	736,252	9.96	▲+0.52	21	+1
National Alliance	60,325	0.82	*	0	-2
Australia	172,176	2.33	▼−0.09	0	0
Democratic Labor	104,974	1.42	▼−3.83	0	0
Liberal Movement	57,817	0.78	*	0	0
Socialist	1,132	0.02	+0.00	0	0
Republican	934	0.01	*	0	0
Communist	539	0.01	▼–0.11	0	0
Independents	29,779	0.40	▼–0.56	0	0
Total	7,391,006			127	+2
Two-party-preferred (estimated)
Labor	Win	51.70	▼−1.00	66	−1
Liberal–Country coalition		48.30	▲+1.00	61	+3

Notes

- The National Alliance was an electoral alliance of the Country Party and the Democratic Labor Party in Western Australia. It defended two seats that had elected the Country Party in 1972 but lost them both.

First preference vote
Labor	49.30%
Liberal	34.95%
Country/NA	10.78%
Australia	2.33%
DLP	1.42%
Other	2.04%

Two-party-preferred vote
Labor	51.70%
Coalition	48.30%

Parliament seats
Labor	51.97%
Coalition	48.03%

=== Senate results ===
Government (29) Labor (29) Opposition (29) Coalition Liberal (23) Country (6) Crossbench (2) Liberal Movement (1) Independent (1)

Senate (STV) – 1974–75 – Turnout 95.50% (CV) – Informal 10.77%
Party	First preference votes	%	Swing	Seats won	Seats held	Change
Labor	3,127,197	47.29	▲+5.08	29	29	+3
Liberal–Country coalition	2,901,454	43.88	▲+5.70	29	29	+3
Liberal–Country joint ticket	2,298,816	34.77	▲+15.26	16	*	*
Liberal	516,919	7.82	▼−9.79	12	23	+2
National Alliance	55,301	0.84	▲+0.84	1	*	*
Country	30,418	0.46	▼–0.60	0	6	+1
Democratic Labor	235,343	3.56	▼−7.55	0	0	–5
Australia	92,107	1.39	▼−1.51	0	0	0
Liberal Movement	63,032	0.95	*	1	1	+1
National Liberal	23,965	0.36	*	0	0	0
Communist	20,583	0.31	*	0	0	0
United Christian	3,977	0.06	*	0	0	0
United Tasmania	2,051	0.03	*	0	0	0
National Socialist	1,810	0.03	▼–0.40	0	0	0
Republican	484	0.01	*	0	0	0
Social Credit	379	0.01	*	0	0	0
Independents	140,003	2.12	▲+0.41	1	1	–2
Total	6,612,385			60	60	

Notes

- The Country Party (CP) contested the elections in Western Australia as the National Alliance (NA), which was a merger of the CP and the Democratic Labor Party (DLP) in that state. The NA won a single Senate seat in WA, its elected representative being Tom Drake-Brockman, who sat with the CP on election to parliament.
- Independent: Michael Townley (Liberal Party from Feb 1975)

The NSW portion of this vote was telling of the disadvantages of requiring the marking of preferences for all the candidates. NSW voters faced a list of 73 candidate for the state's 12 seats. Twelve percent of Labour voters cast improper votes that were rejected. The final seat was taken by a candidate that received only about one percent of the vote. The result across the country was 29 Liberal/National, 29 Labour and two others holding the balance of power.

== Seats changing hands ==
Seat	Pre-1974			Swing	Post-1974		
Seat	Party	Member	Margin	Swing	Margin	Member	Party
Canning, WA	National Alliance	John Hallett	N/A	26.1	14.3	Mel Bungey	Liberal
Henty, Vic	Liberal	Max Fox	0.3	1.8	1.5	Joan Child	Labor
Hume, NSW	Labor	Frank Olley	1.9	2.6	0.7	Stephen Lusher	Country
Isaacs, Vic	Liberal	David Hamer	1.1	1.7	0.6	Gareth Clayton	Labor
Lilley, Qld	Labor	Frank Doyle	0.0	1.0	1.0	Kevin Cairns	Liberal
Mitchell, NSW	Labor	Alfred Ashley-Brown	1.2	2.7	1.5	Alan Cadman	Liberal
Moore, WA	National Alliance	Don Maisey	N/A	1.4	10.5	John Hyde	Liberal
Riverina, NSW	Labor	Al Grassby	6.9	7.7	0.8	John Sullivan	Country
Wide Bay, Qld	Labor	Brendan Hansen	3.3	6.8	3.5	Clarrie Millar	Country

== Aftermath ==
=== Election result ===
The Whitlam government had been re-elected with their majority in the House of Representatives reduced from 9 to 5 seats, while they gained 5 seats in the Senate. The ALP and the coalition each won 29 seats in the 60 member Senate, with the balance of power held by Steele Hall of the Liberal Movement, and Michael Townley, a conservative independent. The Democratic Labor Party, which had been rendered obsolete by the election of the Whitlam government in 1972, lost all five of its Senate seats.

Al Grassby, who was Minister for Immigration in the Labor Whitlam government, lost his seat. Grassby's actions as immigration minister attracted criticism from anti-immigration groups, led by the Immigration Control Association, which targeted his electorate in a campaign at the May 1974 election. Partly as a result, Grassby was defeated by the National Party candidate, John Sullivan, by just 792 votes. Grassby and his supporters accused these groups of mounting a smear campaign against him.

=== Joint sitting ===
The re-elected Whitlam government's failure again to gain a majority in the Senate led to the 1974 joint sitting, Australia's only joint sitting, pursuant to section 57 of the Constitution. It was approved by the new governor-general Sir John Kerr after the bills were presented to the new parliament and were rejected a third time. It was held three months after the election, on 6–7 August, and it enabled the six bills that had been thrice rejected by the Senate to be passed. The Health Insurance bills were both passed on party lines, 95–92, the Petroleum and Minerals Authority legislation also passed on party lines, though with one Liberal Party member absent. Liberal Movement Senator Steele Hall supported the three Electoral bills, citing his experience as Liberal Premier of South Australia, where he had fought his own party in an effort to improve unequal electoral arrangements dubbed the Playmander. Northern Territory Country Party MP Sam Calder supported the Territory Senators legislation, though he opposed the ACT being given added representation.

=== Subsequent changes ===
In February 1975, the independent senator Michael Townley joined the Liberal party. This gave the Coalition 30 out of 60 Senators, with 29 Labor and 1 Liberal Movement (Steele Hall).

Later in 1975, two Coalition premiers would break longstanding convention in the replacement of two ALP senators. Lionel Murphy, who had resigned to take up an appointment to the High Court, was replaced by independent Cleaver Bunton; and Bertie Milliner, who had died, was replaced by Albert Field, an ALP member who was opposed to Whitlam. Bunton (along with Hall) refused to vote against supply, but Field was prepared to. Field took his seat in the Senate as an independent on 9 September. Due to a High Court challenge to his appointment, he was on leave from the Senate, unable to exercise a vote, from 1 October 1975, which reduced the number of sitting senators to 59. This gave the Coalition an effective majority, holding 30 of the 59, allowing them to block supply in the Senate to pave the way for the 1975 Australian constitutional crisis.

== See also ==
- Candidates of the Australian federal election, 1974
- Members of the Australian House of Representatives, 1974–1975
- Members of the Australian Senate, 1974–1975

== Bibliography ==
- AustralianPolitics.com 1974 election details
- University of WA election results in Australia since 1890
- AEC 2PP vote
