= Ruth Coleman =

Australian politician

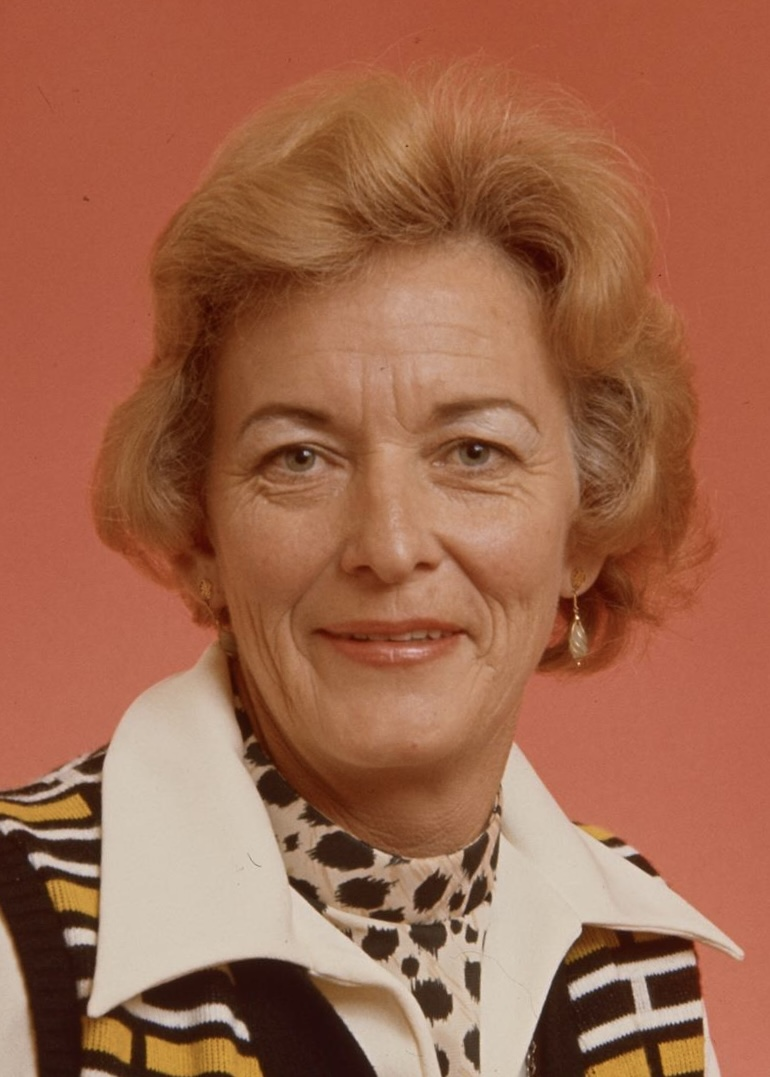
- Coleman in 1974

Senator for Western Australia
- In office 18 May 1974 – 5 June 1987

Personal details
- Born: Ruth Nancy Huckstep; 27 September 1931 Collie, Western Australia, Australia
- Died: 27 March 2008 (aged 76) Bassendean, Western Australia, Australia
- Party: Labor
- Occupation: Public relations officer Consumer advocate

Ruth Nancy Coleman (née Huckstep; 27 September 1931 – 27 March 2008) was an Australian politician. She was a member of the Australian Labor Party (ALP) and served as a Senator for Western Australia from 1974 to 1987. She was prominent in the anti-nuclear movement.

== Early life ==
Coleman was born on 27 September 1931 in Collie, Western Australia, the daughter of Alice Beatrice (née Boulden) and Vincent Huckstep. Her father was a railway ganger and the family moved frequently during her childhood.

Coleman began her schooling at a state school in East Victoria Park and later boarded at a convent school in Toodyay. She left school at the age of 13 and "was variously employed as a bus conductress, usherette, waitress, housemaid and cashier". She later trained as a telephonist and found work as a secretary, then moved into "publishing, advertising and copywriting, and eventually public relations".

Coleman moved to Melbourne in the 1950s with her first husband, where she began working in radio and television. In 1964 she made an appearance as a cafe proprietor in Consider Your Verdict. She returned to Perth in 1964 following her divorce and worked for Swan Television (Channel Nine) as a publicity and promotions officer.

== Consumer activism ==
In 1970, Coleman became interested in consumer protection after buying a pantsuit falsely labelled as pure linen. She became the inaugural secretary of the Consumers' Action Movement in 1971 and was subsequently appointed to the Consumer Affairs Council of Western Australia and the Retail Trades and Control Advisory Committee. The Australian Women's Weekly reported in 1974 that she was a "household name throughout Western Australia" and had made 117 speeches the previous year.

== Politics ==
Before her election to parliament, Coleman served as treasurer of the Mount Lawley branch of the ALP and was a member of the state executive. She was elected to the Senate at the 1974 federal election, with all seats vacant due to a double dissolution. Coleman and Jean Melzer of Victoria were the ALP's first female senators since the retirement of Dorothy Tangney in 1968. She was re-elected at the 1975, 1977 and 1983 elections.

Coleman served on numerous Senate committees, including as chair of the Industry and Trade committee during the Whitlam and Hawke governments. Although she described herself as "not a feminist", she spoke frequently on women's issues. She was also interested in Aboriginal affairs but was "most remembered for her passionate opposition to the threat of nuclear warfare and to uranium mining, and for her defence of civil liberties". In 1979, she was arrested at a protest against the Bjelke-Petersen government in Queensland, and subsequently fined $70. She was again arrested and fined the following year following a protest in Perth. Coleman sponsored the Nuclear News Roundup newsletter and was a co-founder of Women Against Uranium Mining. In 1983 she was threatened with expulsion from the ALP if she crossed the floor to vote against the Hawke government's approval of the Olympic Dam mine.

While serving as a temporary chairman of committees, Coleman remarked "I have no sex in this position" in response to Michael Townley expressing confusion over the correct form of address for a woman in the chair. Her retort "immediately sent more than a ripple of laughter through the chamber" and she was reputedly "annoyed Hansard did not show the comments".

In November 1984, Coleman suffered a severe stroke at her office in Midland, days before the 1984 federal election. She did not regain consciousness for several days and was reportedly close to death. She retired from the Senate at the 1987 election.

== Personal life ==
Coleman had a daughter from her first marriage. She remarried in 1967 to Jim Coleman, with whom she had one son. Her husband served as the secretary of the Trades and Labour Council of Western Australia and was later appointed to the Commonwealth Conciliation and Arbitration Commission. He also retired in 1987 and the couple settled in Yunderup. Coleman returned to Perth following her husband's death and lived in Bassendean until her death from cancer on 27 March 2008. She was cremated at Karrakatta Cemetery.
