= Frieda Brown =

Frieda Jessie Brown (née Marshall; 3 January 1932 - 19 February 2023) was an Australian Christian campaigner who served as national president of the Festival of Light from 1976 to 1978 and co-founded the Australian Family Action Movement.

Brown was born in Coventry, England. She received a Master of Arts (Hons) from Oxford University in 1956 and married Clive Lindsey Brown, an Anglican clergyman, in 1960. In 1973 she was appointed an adviser on social and moral issues for the Christian Women's Conventions International, and in 1974 co-founded the Australian Family Action Movement, a conservative Christian political pressure group. From 1976 to 1978 she was national president of the Festival of Light. She also served as a council member for the Church of England Marriage Guidance Centre from 1973 and a synod member of the Sydney Diocese. She appeared extensively in the media commenting on family values and headed the Family Action Movement's election tickets for the Senate in 1974 and 1975 and for the New South Wales Legislative Council in 1978.
