= Luke Cuni =

Albanian-Australian community leader (1911–1980)

Luke Cuni (31 August 1911 – 22 May 1980) was an Albanian-Australian community leader.

He was born in Prizren in Kosovo the part of the Ottoman Empire to John and Marta Cuni, ethnic Albanians. He studied classics and philosophy in Skopje and married Filomena Marko on 1 July 1936. He organised celebrations of Albanian Flag Day in defiance of the Yugoslav government, and in 1944 escaped Yugoslavia with his family as refugees after Albanian communist forces drove out the Italian-backed regime. The Cunis arrived in Melbourne in 1950, having spent the previous six years in refugee camps in Austria and Italy.

Cuni worked at a hostel in Williamstown while Filomena was employed as a housemaid in Croydon. They settled in Yarraville in 1954 and Cuni was naturalised in 1957. He worked as a storeman and a language interpreter, speaking eight languages. He worked with community groups including the Australia Day Council, the Captive Nations Association, the Yarraville Community Centre, the Good Neighbour Council and the Catholic Family Welfare Bureau. He presented the Albanian language program on radio 3ZZ and 3EA from 1975 to 1980. A noted pacifist, he was shot on 21 May 1980 while working as an interpreter at the Supreme Court of Victoria and died at the Royal Melbourne Hospital the following day.
