= Yunderup, Western Australia =

Yunderup may refer to two places:

- North Yunderup, Western Australia
- South Yunderup, Western Australia
