= Casual vacancies in the Australian Parliament =

In the Parliament of Australia, a casual vacancy arises when a member of either the Senate or the House of Representatives:

- dies
- resigns mid-term
- is expelled from Parliament and their seat is declared vacant,
- is absent from (fails to attend) the house, without the permission of the house, for two consecutive months of a session, or
- is disqualified.

== Disqualification ==
The Commonwealth Electoral Act 1918 requires candidates for Parliament to be Australian citizens.

A member will be disqualified if they are found to have been ineligible for election, or become ineligible to sit, because they:

- are a subject or citizen of a foreign power or under an acknowledgment of allegiance, obedience or adherence to a foreign power
- are attainted (convicted) of treason
- have been convicted and are under sentence or subject to be sentenced for an offence punishable by imprisonment for one year or longer under a Commonwealth or State law
- are an undischarged bankrupt or insolvent
- hold any office of profit (i.e. income) under the Crown or any pension payable during the pleasure of the Crown out of any Commonwealth revenues, or
- have any direct or indirect pecuniary interest in any agreement with the Commonwealth Public Service in any way other than as a member in common with other members of an incorporated company consisting of more than 25 persons.

A member will also be disqualified if they:

- take the benefit, whether by assignment, composition, or otherwise, of any law relating to bankrupt or insolvent debtors
- directly or indirectly take or agree to take any fee or honorarium for services rendered to the Commonwealth, or for services rendered in the Parliament to any person or State
- have been convicted of bribery, undue influence or interference with political liberty, or have been found by the Court of Disputed Returns to have committed or attempted to commit bribery or undue influence when a candidate (the disqualification is for two years from the date of the conviction or finding), or
- are of unsound mind.

== Resignation ==
A member of the House of Representatives may resign by tendering the resignation to the Speaker, as required by section 37 of the Australian Constitution, or in the absence of the Speaker to the Governor-General. Similarly, a senator would tender the resignation to the President of the Senate or in the absence of the President to the Governor-General, as required by section 19 of the Constitution.

== Senate casual vacancies ==
=== States ===
When a Senate seat representing one of the six states becomes vacant, Section 15 of the Australian Constitution requires the parliament of the relevant state to choose a replacement. This is done in a joint sitting of the upper and lower houses (except for Queensland, which has a unicameral parliament). If the state parliament is not in session, then the governor of the state (acting on the advice of the state's executive council) may appoint the replacement, but such an appointment lapses if it is not confirmed by a joint sitting within 14 days after the beginning of the next session of the state parliament.

Prior to 29 July 1977, senators were elected for a six-year term, people appointed to a casual vacancy only held office until the earlier of the next election for the House of Representatives or the Senate, at which the vacancy would be filled by the electors of the relevant state. It was also an established convention, but not a constitutional requirement, that the state parliament choose (or the governor appoint) a replacement from the same political party as their predecessor. It had also been the practice for the relevant party to provide a list of suitable names to the state premier, and for the state parliament to make the choice. Before 1946, the conventions were not as firmly established, with ten casual vacancies being filled by someone from a different party. After 1946, however, they were not breached again until 1975 – twice:

- On 9 February 1975, the New South Wales Labor Senator Lionel Murphy resigned from the Senate to take up an appointment as a judge of the High Court of Australia. On 27 February, the NSW Liberal Premier Tom Lewis appointed Cleaver Bunton, a former long-serving Mayor of Albury, who was not affiliated with any political party. Bunton sat as an independent senator.
- On 30 June 1975, the Queensland Labor Senator Bertie Milliner died suddenly. The Labor Party gave only one replacement name to the Country Party Queensland premier Joh Bjelke-Petersen — that of Mal Colston. However, on 3 September, at Bjelke-Petersen's instigation, the Parliament of Queensland appointed Albert Field to the vacancy. Although he had been a member of the Labor Party for 30 years, Field was now openly critical of the Labor government of Gough Whitlam, and he was immediately expelled from the party for accepting the appointment. Field took his seat in the Senate as an independent. However, there were doubts as to his constitutional eligibility to sit at all. Although he had resigned from the Queensland Department of Education the day before he was appointed, the Education Act (Qld) required three weeks' notice of resignation, and it was arguable that he was therefore still in Crown service (this technicality had been ignored many times in the past). The Labor Party immediately challenged Field's appointment in the High Court, and he was on leave from the Senate from 1 October for the remainder of his short-lived term, which ended when the parliament was dissolved on 11 November.

On 21 May 1977, a referendum was held on the question of whether Section 15 of the Constitution should be changed to require future Senate casual vacancies to be filled by a member of the party represented by the former senator at the time of their election, if the state parliament chooses to fill the vacancy, and the new senator's term continues until the end of the original senator's term. The referendum was passed and came into effect on 29 July 1977. Where a senator had been elected representing a certain party, and changed allegiances to a different party mid-term, and then died or resigned, the replacement senator would be a person representing the first party. This was first implemented when South Australia Senator Steele Hall, who at the time of his election represented the Liberal Movement but had later changed to the Liberal Party of Australia, resigned and was replaced by Janine Haines. She represented the Australian Democrats and was chosen because the Liberal Movement had merged with the Democrats.

Despite the constitutional change, a party's nomination to replace the casual vacancy does not guarantee that the nominee will be appointed to the Senate by the state parliament. Even when there is only a single nominee, there must be a vote to approve the appointment. This means that if the state parliament votes against the nominee, the vacancy is not filled. This was demonstrated when Labor's Don Grimes resigned from the Senate in April 1987. A vote to appoint Labor's nominee John Devereux was undertaken by a joint sitting of the Tasmanian Parliament on 8 May 1987, which resulted in a tied vote. Under Tasmanian Parliament's rules adopted for joint sittings, "if the votes are equal, the Question shall be resolved in the Negative". Therefore the tied vote rejected Devereux's nomination to the Senate. Ray Groom, a Tasmanian Liberal minister, argued: "section 15 of the Constitution clearly states that it is for the Parliament to choose the person to fill the vacancy and not the party. we can choose only a person who is a member of the same party ... but we are not bound to accept the nomination of the party concerned". The move by the Liberal state government was criticised by federal Liberal leader John Howard for "voting against established convention and the intent of the Constitutional change". The joint sitting to appoint another replacement was adjourned but ultimately did not take place, as the Senate was dissolved on 5 June for a double dissolution election in July and therefore a replacement was no longer required.

When a vacancy exists in the Senate as a result of the ineligibility of a person to be elected, as in the 2017 dual citizenship cases, the seat of the disqualified Senator is filled by a countback of the previous Senate election results in the affected State, as was the method used in Re Culleton (No 2) and in the Re Day (No 2).

A vacancy may also exist when a Senator resigns or dies after they were re-elected to the Senate but before the start of the next Senate term. This means a vacancy is created in both the current term and the following term that has not yet commenced, creating a constitutional quirk. This happened for the first time on 24 October 2013, a month after the 2013 federal election, when New South Wales Labor Senator Bob Carr resigned from the Senate. Carr's current term was to expire on 30 June 2014, and he was already re-elected to the Senate in the election for the following term starting 1 July 2014. Deborah O'Neill was selected by Labor to fill the casual vacancy, and was appointed by the NSW Parliament on 13 November 2013. In an unprecedented situation where Carr resigned both his current term and the following term, the NSW Government sought legal advice from the Crown Solicitor of New South Wales regarding the tenure of O'Neill's appointment. The Crown Solicitor's advice was that the NSW Parliament could only fill the current vacancy, and would have to wait until July 2014 (start of the new term) to fill the future vacancy. Initially, there were no planned sitting days between July and mid-August 2014, however, a reduced joint sitting of 13 lower house MPs and over 40 Legislative Councillors was held on 2 July 2014 to reappoint O'Neill to the Senate for the new term.

=== Territories ===
When a Senate seat representing the Australian Capital Territory (ACT) or the Northern Territory (NT) becomes vacant, the replacement senator is chosen by the ACT Legislative Assembly or the NT Legislative Assembly, under section 44 of the Commonwealth Electoral Act 1918 (Text). This process was used in NT for the first and only time on 16 June 1998, when Trish Crossin was chosen by the NT Legislative Assembly to replace Bob Collins, who had resigned from the Senate on 30 March. In the ACT, the process was used for the first time on 18 February 2003, when Gary Humphries was chosen by the ACT Legislative Assembly to replace Margaret Reid, who had resigned from the Senate on 14 February.

If the Assembly is not in session, then the Administrator of the NT (acting on the advice of the territory's executive council) or the Chief Minister of the ACT may appoint the replacement, but such an appointment lapses if it is not confirmed within 14 days after the beginning of the next session of the territory assembly. This procedure is very similar to the procedure for states, albeit under a different legislation or legal document.

Prior to 1989, different processes were used to appoint territory senators to casual vacancies. The original Senate (Representation of Territories) Act 1973 was passed in the 1974 joint sitting and took effect on 7 August 1974, allowing the election of two senators from NT and ACT each. In section 9 of the original act, for NT or ACT casual vacancies, the President of the Senate, or the Governor-General in absence of the President, may issue a writ for the election of a new Senator (i.e. by-election). If there are two casual vacancies in one territory, a writ may be issued for a single election of two new senators. These provisions were in place until 1980, but they never occurred.

The Senate (Representation of Territories) Act 1973, including Section 9, was amended by the Senate (Representation of Territories) Amendment Act 1980 in May 1980. In the amended Senate (Representation of Territories) Act 1973, NT casual vacancy replacements were to be chosen by the NT Legislative Assembly, the same way as it is currently. The ACT had not gained self-government yet, so the replacement senator was elected by a joint sitting of both houses of the Federal Parliament. This had occurred twice:

- when Margaret Reid was elected on 5 May 1981 to replace the deceased ACT Senator John Knight
- when Bob McMullan was elected on 16 February 1988 to replace former ACT Senator Susan Ryan, who had resigned.

In February 1984, these provisions were incorporated into the Commonwealth Electoral Act 1918, as amended by the Commonwealth Electoral Legislation Amendment Act 1983. The ACT gained self-government in 1989, and the Commonwealth Electoral Act 1918 was again amended by the A.C.T. Self-Government (Consequential Provisions) Act 1988 to allow ACT casual vacancy replacements to be chosen by the ACT Legislative Assembly, the same way as it is currently.

In accordance with the Commonwealth Electoral Act 1918, the provision of a joint sitting of both houses of the Federal Parliament would still be used to fill a Senate casual vacancy in the representation of any territory other than NT or the ACT, if such a territory ever gained separate Senate representation.

== House of Representatives casual vacancies ==
Casual vacancies in the House of Representatives are filled by a by-election. There is no constitutional requirement for a by-election to be held within any particular time, or at all. When a general election is expected within a relatively short time, it has often been the practice not to hold a by-election. This has been justified on the grounds that: (a) the electors of the seat in question should not be burdened with voting twice within a short period of time, when their views are hardly likely to change significantly in that time; and (b) the cost of holding a by-election is considerable, and it is ultimately the taxpayers who bear the cost. For example, the death of three Cabinet ministers in the 1940 Canberra air disaster on 13 August 1940 meant that three by-elections would have been required. However, a general election was already being planned to be held in the coming weeks and the by-elections were therefore not required.

If it is appropriate to hold a by-election, the Speaker consults with the Australian Electoral Commission as to the suitability of various dates, invites comments from the various party leaders about the proposed dates, makes the final choice, and issues the writ. At least 33 days must elapse between the moment the Speaker issues a writ and the date of a by-election, and the Speaker cannot issue the writ until receipt of a formal letter of resignation. A by-election must take place on a Saturday.

If, since the previous general election, there has been a re-distribution that has altered the boundaries of the division in question, then the boundaries as at the original election still apply, but only those electors enrolled for that division at the time of the by-election are permitted, and required, to vote.

== See also ==
- List of Australian federal by-elections
- List of Australian Senate appointments
- States and territories of Australia
