= Ron Maunsell =

Australian politician

Senator for Queensland
- In office 1 July 1968 – 30 June 1981

Personal details
- Born: 8 May 1922 Cairns, Queensland
- Died: 17 December 2010 (aged 88) Cairns North, Queensland
- Party: Australian Country Party
- Occupation: Grazier

Charles Ronald Maunsell (8 May 1922 – 17 December 2010) was an Australian politician.

Born in Cairns, Queensland, he was educated at state schools before serving as a pilot in the Royal Australian Air Force 77 Squadron from 1942 to 1947, reaching the rank of Flight Lieutenant. He was initially an earthmoving contractor, becoming a sheep grazier at Longreach on a property bought with his parents. He married Joan Meakin on 17 April 1954.

In 1967, he was elected to the Australian Senate as a Country Party Senator for Queensland. He held the seat until his defeat at the 1980 election, taking effect in 1981.

One of his most notable moments was his involvement in what became known as the Gair Affair or "The Night of the Long Prawns", in April 1974. He regularly brought a batch of prawns from his home base in Townsville to share with his parliamentary colleagues in Canberra, and on that night he used this generosity as a ruse to keep DLP Senator Vince Gair entertained in his office all night, thus delaying Gair's resignation from the Senate in order to take up an appointment as Ambassador to Ireland, which had been offered to him by Gough Whitlam's Labor government as a strategy to increase Labor's numbers in the Senate. The timing was crucial, as the non-Labor forces were aware that the Queensland Premier Joh Bjelke-Petersen was arranging that night to issue writs for five Queensland senators for the forthcoming half-Senate election; if Gair had resigned first, writs for six senators would have been required, improving Labor's chances. Ultimately Whitlam decided to call a double dissolution instead of the half-Senate election he had previously announced; all seats in the parliament were up for re-election, and the Gair Affair became irrelevant.

Maunsell died at Cairns in 2010 (aged 88), survived by his wife Joan and three daughters.
