= Mal Colston =

Australian politician

Deputy President of the Senate
- In office 20 August 1996 – 6 May 1997
- President: Margaret Reid
- Preceded by: Margaret Reid
- Succeeded by: Sue West
- In office 21 August 1990 – 16 August 1993
- President: Kerry Sibraa
- Preceded by: David Hamer
- Succeeded by: Noel Crichton-Browne

Father of the Senate
- In office 1 July 1993 – 30 June 1999 Serving with Brian Harradine (Note: From 1 September 1998)
- Preceded by: Peter Durack
- Succeeded by: Brian Harradine

Senator for Queensland
- In office 13 December 1975 – 30 June 1999

Personal details
- Born: 5 April 1938 Brisbane, Queensland, Australia
- Died: 23 August 2003 (aged 65) Brisbane, Queensland, Australia
- Party: Queensland First (1996–1999); Independent (1996); Labor (1958–1996)
- Spouse: Dawn Patricia McMullen
- Children: 1
- Education: University of Queensland
- Occupation: Teacher; Politician

Malcolm Arthur Colston (5 April 1938 – 23 August 2003) was an Australian politician who served as a Senator for Queensland from 1975 to 1999. He was a member of the Labor Party until 1996, when he resigned to sit as an independent following a dispute over his candidacy for Deputy President of the Senate. Colston was a schoolteacher before entering politics, and held a doctorate in educational psychology from the University of Queensland.

== Early life ==
Colston was born in Brisbane on 5 April 1938. He was the son of Myrtle Clorine Ruby (née Wenck) and Douglas Thomas Colston. His mother was a schoolteacher and his father was a carpenter.

Colston attended Mitchelton State School and Brisbane State High School. He completed a teaching qualification at the Queensland Teachers' College and taught at small rural primary schools in south-east Queensland between 1957 and 1964. He grew dissatisfied with the isolation of his postings and later worked as an educational guidance officer. In 1966, Colston began studying full-time at the University of Queensland, working as a casual labourer to support himself. He graduated Bachelor of Education (Hons.) in 1967 and Doctor of Philosophy in 1970. His doctoral thesis in educational psychology was titled "Motivation in the elementary school: a study of the effects of variables in the classroom on the arousal of pupil's motives to achieve success and to avoid failure".

After completing his doctorate, Colston joined the Queensland Police as officer-in-charge of its planning and research division. He resigned in 1973 to concentrate on his political career, but returned to the public service after the 1974 election. He was also seconded to the state government's Department of Industrial Affairs for a period.

== Early political involvement ==
=== Early candidacies ===
Colston joined the Australian Labor Party in 1958 at the age of 19, following his parents into the party. He unsuccessfully sought ALP preselection for the seat of Cooroora prior to the 1963 Queensland state election. He first stood for federal parliament at the 1970 Senate election, placed third on the ALP ticket.

Colston unsuccessfully sought Senate preselection prior to the 1972 federal election, but following a double dissolution in 1974 he was placed fifth on the party's Senate ticket in Queensland. He was narrowly defeated by Country Party candidate Glen Sheil for the final vacancy. The expectation of Colston's victory was such that he was invited to attend the first meeting of the ALP Caucus after the election and was able to vote on the composition of the third Whitlam ministry. In 1975 he published a book, The Odd One Out, about his experiences.

=== Role in 1975 constitutional crisis ===
Colston indirectly played a role in the 1975 Australian constitutional crisis.

On 30 June 1975, Queensland ALP Senator Bert Milliner died suddenly. The Labor Party nominated Colston to fill the casual vacancy in the Senate. The Constitution provides that a Senate casual vacancy is filled by a person chosen by the relevant state parliament. Although not a constitutional requirement until 1977, it was long a convention for the state parliament to choose a person nominated by the departing Senator's political party. However, the Premier of Queensland, Joh Bjelke-Petersen, claimed that Colston was a "dangerous socialist" and refused to appoint him. Officially, though, Bjelke-Petersen expressed doubts over Colston's integrity and instead appointed Albert Field, a member of the Labor Party who was staunchly opposed to the policies of the Gough Whitlam Labor government.

The ALP challenged Field's appointment in the High Court, and Field was on leave from the Senate almost from the day of his appointment. That gave the Coalition a greater advantage and so was one of the crucial events that led to the dismissal of the Whitlam government.

== Senator for Queensland (1975–1999) ==
=== Labor Senator ===
At the ensuing 1975 election, Colston was elected as a Labor senator. He continued to serve in that capacity until 1996.

From 1993 to his retirement, he was a joint Father of the Senate, along with Brian Harradine.

=== Resignation from Labor Party ===
After the 1996 election, the Labor Party refused to nominate Colston to become Deputy President of the Senate, a position he had previously held from 1990 to 1993. In a bid to win him over, the Howard Coalition government offered to support him. Colston resigned from the Labor Party by fax message at 11:30 a.m., on 20 August, and he took his seat as an independent that afternoon. In the evening, he was elected Deputy President, on the nomination of the Coalition. He opposed the Coalition's industrial relations package, but he voted for the sale of a third of Telstra and some other government initiatives. Colston then sat as a "Queensland First" senator. Labor Senator Robert Ray later dubbed Colston the "Quisling Quasimodo from Queensland".

=== Travel allowances scandal ===
In 1997, Colston was charged by the Commonwealth Director of Public Prosecutions with 28 charges of defrauding the Commonwealth by allegedly misusing his parliamentary travel allowance. He then revealed that he was suffering from cancer. Prosecution was not pursued after medical opinion was provided that Colston was unlikely to live long enough for a trial to be completed. In the event, he survived for a further six years. He retired from the Senate at the end of his term.

== Death and estate ==
Colston died of colon cancer in August 2003. He had appointed his wife, Dawn Colston, as executor and trustee of his will, but she died eleven months later, before she could dispose of her husband's will. She had appointed her brother, Brian McMullen, as executor of her will.

The Colstons' son, Douglas Colston, claimed that he was entitled to half the income of his parents' estates, and initiated action against McMullen. The case was ongoing, as of September 2011. As of 2022, the outcome of this case is unknown.

Notwithstanding the controversies that he generated after his defection from Labor, Colston requested that no condolence motion be moved in the Senate after his death.

Parliament of Australia
Preceded by Peter Durack	Father of the Australian Senate; 1993–1999 with Brian Harradine	Succeeded by Brian Harradine
