= Bert Milliner =

Australian politician

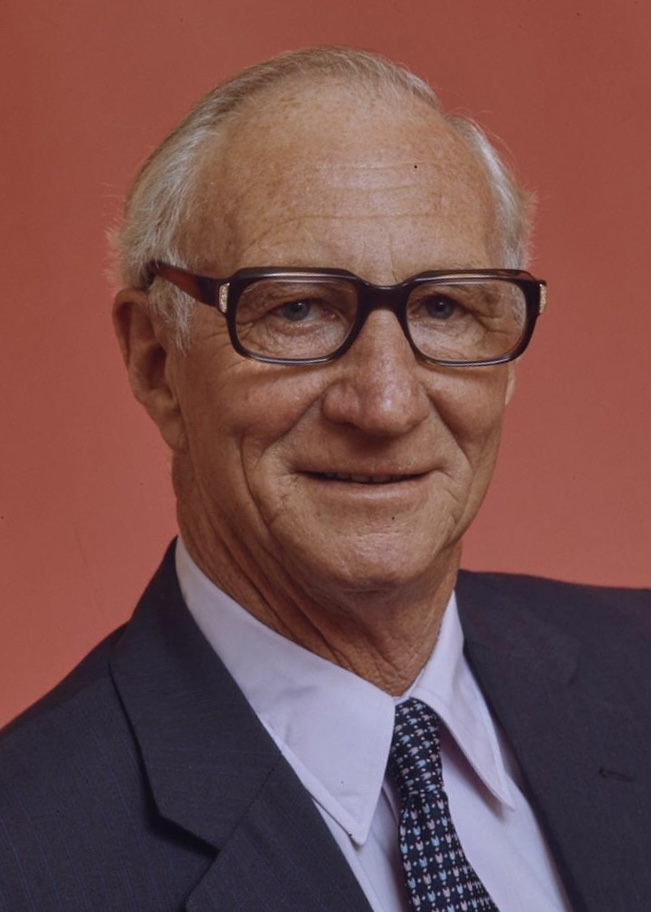
- Milliner in 1974

Senator for Queensland
- In office 1 July 1968 – 30 June 1975
- Succeeded by: Albert Field

Personal details
- Born: 17 July 1911 Kelvin Grove, Queensland
- Died: 30 June 1975 (aged 63) Brisbane, Queensland
- Party: Australian Labor Party
- Spouse: Thelma Elizabeth Voght
- Occupation: Unionist

Bertie Richard "Bert" Milliner (17 July 1911 – 30 June 1975) was an Australian trade unionist, politician and Senator, representing the Australian Labor Party (ALP). He would have been a minor figure in Australia's political history but for the events that followed his sudden death. Those circumstances contributed to the 1975 Australian constitutional crisis, which culminated in the dismissal of the Prime Minister, Gough Whitlam, by the Governor-General, Sir John Kerr.

== Biography ==
Milliner was born at Kelvin Grove, Brisbane. He attended the local state school, served an apprenticeship as a compositor at the Queensland Government Printing Office and became a linotype-operator. On 26 March 1938 he married Thelma Elizabeth Voght, a schoolteacher.

He joined the Queensland Printing Employees' Union and was elected in 1934 to the board of management. A delegate to the Trades and Labor Council of Queensland, he was a member of the executive (from 1952) and treasurer (1960–67). As trade-union adviser on the Australian delegations, he travelled to Geneva to attend the thirty-seventh (1954) and forty-eighth (1964) sessions of the International Labour Conference.

Milliner represented Small Unions (1947–50) and his own union (from 1950) on the Queensland central executive of Labor. An active and influential State party manager, he chaired the rules committee, held office as vice-president for a term, and was president in 1963–68. At the meeting called in April 1957 to consider the situation of the then Labor Premier of Queensland, Vince Gair, he moved that there be further negotiations before the premier's expulsion from Labor was discussed; when his proposal was rejected, he voted with the TLC group to expel Gair.

Milliner was a competent chairman who tried to achieve unity, to broaden the party's electoral base, and to encourage the involvement of women and the young. His leadership proved decisive in winning party support in Queensland for Gough Whitlam in his confrontation with Labor's federal executive in February 1966.

In 1962 Milliner had unsuccessfully sought party nomination to be considered by the Legislative Assembly of Queensland for a casual vacancy in the Senate following the death of Max Poulter. Labor had nominated the unsuccessful candidate, Alf Arnell, however he was rejected by the Queensland Legislative Assembly. Labor then nominated George Whiteside who was appointed. At the 1967 election he won a seat in the Senate. His term began on 1 July 1968. He sat on ten parliamentary committees and in 1974 was appointed temporary Chairman of Committees in the Senate.

== Death and replacement ==
Milliner died suddenly of a heart attack on 30 June 1975 in his Brisbane office. The question of his replacement then arose. Since the introduction of proportional voting in 1949 it had been a convention that when a casual vacancy arose through the resignation or death of a senator mid-term, the relevant state parliament would replace the senator with a person nominated by the departed senator's political party. On this occasion Labor nominated the unsuccessful candidate Mal Colston, however the Queensland Premier Joh Bjelke-Petersen asked for a list of three names, which Labor refused to supply. Bjelke-Petersen then invited nominations from any financial member of the Labor Party. Albert Field, who was a Labor member but was openly critical of the Whitlam government, applied and was appointed by the Queensland Legislative Assembly.

Labor immediately expelled Field from the party because he accepted an appointment contrary to its wishes. Labor challenged his appointment in the High Court, arguing that he was still technically employed by the Queensland Public Service (an office of profit under the Crown) at the time of his acceptance of the appointment because he had resigned, but without giving the required two weeks' notice. Consequently, Field was on leave from the Senate for all but a few days of his term. The death of Milliner and his replacement by Field was one of the factors that enabled the Senate to block the Whitlam government's supply bills, which in turn led to the government's dismissal.

Milliner's son Glen was a member of the Legislative Assembly of Queensland from 1977 to 1998.
