= Albert Field =

Australian politician

Pat Field

Senator for Queensland
- In office 3 September 1975 – 11 November 1975
- Preceded by: Bertie Milliner

Personal details
- Born: Albert Patrick Field; 11 October 1910 Durrington, Wiltshire, England
- Died: 1 July 1990 (aged 79) Caboolture, Queensland, Australia
- Party: Labor (1937–1975); Independent (1975–1979); National (1979–1990)
- Occupation: Public servant

Albert Patrick Field (11 October 1910 – 1 July 1990) was an Australian Labor Party member. In 1975 he was chosen as a Senator in unusual circumstances that played a significant role in precipitating the 1975 Australian constitutional crisis. Gough Whitlam described him as "an individual of the utmost obscurity, from which he rose and to which he sank with equal speed".

== Early life ==
Field was born in Durrington, Wiltshire, England, in 1910. His parents' frequent ill health made him spend much of his childhood in orphanages and boys' homes. He moved to Australia in 1926 and worked in mines and on sheep stations.

== Early career ==
He joined the Australian Labor Party in 1937 and became president of the Morningside branch of the party. He served in the Australian Army in New Guinea during World War II. On his discharge, he became a French polisher.

He worked for the Queensland Education Department and was elected president of the Queensland branch of the Federated Furnishing Trade Society of Australasia in the early 1970s.

== Senator ==
On 30 June 1975, Bertie Milliner, a Queensland ALP Senator, died suddenly. It had long been a tradition that when a casual vacancy occurred in the Senate, the relevant political party would nominate the replacement to the state premier, and the state parliament would formally appoint that person as the new senator. Following the usual practice, the Labor Party nominated only one person, Mal Colston, to replace Milliner. Country Party Premier Joh Bjelke-Petersen asked for a list of three names from which he would choose the replacement; he was possibly relying on a 1962 precedent, when his predecessor, Frank Nicklin, had also required such a list of names. The Labor Party refused to provide a list and insisted on Colston being appointed.

Although Field had long Labor Party and union connections, he was not an active politician and had never before sought to become one. Nevertheless, he made himself known to the Premier's office and offered his services. Although he would be technically a Labor senator, Field vowed never to vote for the Whitlam government. He was conservative and religious and was openly critical of what he saw as a range of immoral policies being advanced by Whitlam and his government. Prior to taking his seat in the Senate, Field expressed some of his personal views which included his belief that postage stamps were too expensive, and that he was against pornography and homosexuality. That was precisely the sort of person wanted by Bjelke-Petersen, who responded by nominating Field in the Parliament of Queensland as the new senator.

The parliament was far from unanimous in supporting the unconventional appointment, but it was approved by 50 votes to 26, the appointment being formally made by the parliament on 3 September 1975. Malcolm Fraser, the federal opposition leader, had misgivings and stated publicly that Colston's name should have been accepted. However, Fraser's deputy, the Country Party leader, Doug Anthony, had no such qualms.

Field was expelled from the Labor Party for offering his name for Senate selection against the official ALP candidate. He took his seat in the Senate as an independent on 9 September. When he was sworn in, most Labor senators boycotted the sitting. Labor Senate leader Ken Wriedt attended but sat with his back to Field.

Field had resigned from the Education Department immediately before his Senate appointment, but there was a dispute about whether he remained a public servant when appointed because the Education Act required him to give three weeks' notice. That may have made him constitutionally ineligible to be chosen as a senator, so the Labor Party challenged his appointment in the High Court. Thus, he was on leave from the Senate after 1 October 1975, unable to exercise a vote. He had not given his maiden speech and had asked only a single question in Question Time.

The opposition parties did not provide a pair to maintain the relative positions of the government and the opposition. This gave the opposition a majority in the Senate, allowing it to pass motions to defer consideration of supply, and thereby force the 1975 Australian constitutional crisis.

== Later life ==
The end of Field's Senate term came on 11 November 1975, when the parliament was dissolved in a double dissolution. He stood at the consequent 13 December election that resulted in part from his appointment but was not elected. He formed his own party in 1976, which folded three years later, and he later joined the National Party.

The controversy surrounding his and Cleaver Bunton's appointments prompted an amendment to the Constitution in 1977 to require casual Senate vacancies to be filled by a member of the same party.

Field lived out his days in Caboolture, Queensland. He suffered from Parkinson's disease in later life. He died of asphyxia by hanging in 1990. He was survived by a daughter and a stepdaughter.
