= Cleaver Bunton =

Australian politician

Cleaver Bunton AO OBE
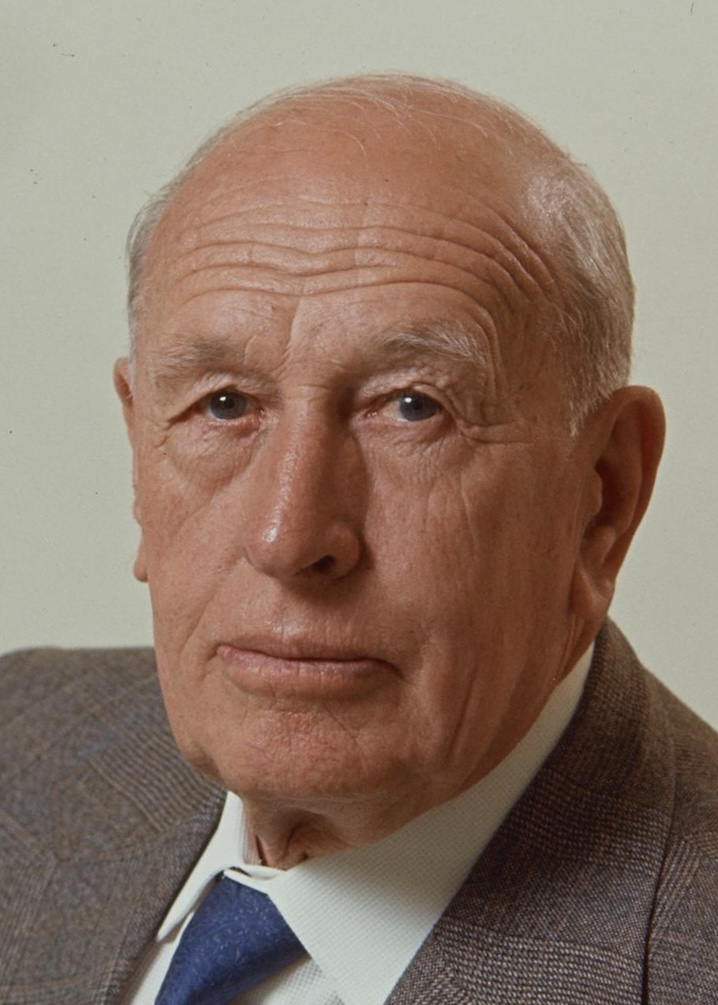
- Bunton in 1975

Senator for New South Wales
- In office 27 February 1975 – 11 November 1975
- Preceded by: Lionel Murphy

39th Mayor of Albury
- In office 1945–1960
- Preceded by: Doug Padman
- Succeeded by: John King
- In office 1960–1972
- Preceded by: John King
- Succeeded by: Tom Pearsall
- In office 1974–1976
- Preceded by: Tom Pearsall
- Succeeded by: Max Barry

Alderman on Albury Council
- In office 21 March 1925 – 1931
- In office 1937–1976

Personal details
- Born: 5 May 1902 Albury, New South Wales, Australia
- Died: 20 January 1999 (aged 96) Albury, New South Wales, Australia
- Party: Independent
- Spouses: Eileen O'Malley (m. 1930–1982) Kommertje Berkel (m. 1984–1999)
- Occupation: Local councillor

Cleaver Ernest Bunton AO OBE (5 May 1902 – 20 January 1999) was an Australian independent politician who served as the mayor of Albury for three non-consecutive terms between 1945 and 1976. He was first elected to Albury City Council in 1925 and was an aldermen for 45 years.

Bunton came to national prominence in 1975 when he was controversially appointed to the Senate by New South Wales premier Tom Lewis, a member of the Liberal Party, to fill a position vacated by a Labor Party member.

== Early life ==
Born in Albury, Bunton left school at 13 and initially worked as a clerk in a solicitor's office before becoming an accountant. He was also involved in Albury sporting and community affairs, playing Australian rules football with the Albury Football Club, becoming captain-coach and club secretary at 17. His younger brother Haydn Bunton went on to become a notable Australian rules footballer.

Bunton married Eileen O'Malley in 1930. In 1930, he was elected president of the Ovens and Murray Football League (a position he held until 1969). He also held administrative roles in the Victorian Country Football League, the West Albury Tennis Club and a range of other community groups and organisations.

== Municipal career ==
In recognition of his role in Albury, Bunton was encouraged to run for a position on the Albury Municipal Council, and was elected in 1925 at the age of 22, the youngest person ever elected to a council to that time. After initially retiring in 1931, he returned to the council in 1937, was elected Mayor of Albury in 1945, serving from 1946 until August 1976 (with brief breaks in 1961 and 1972–73).

Bunton was also a regional radio commentator, commenting on sport and reading the news bulletins.

== Appointment to the Australian Senate ==
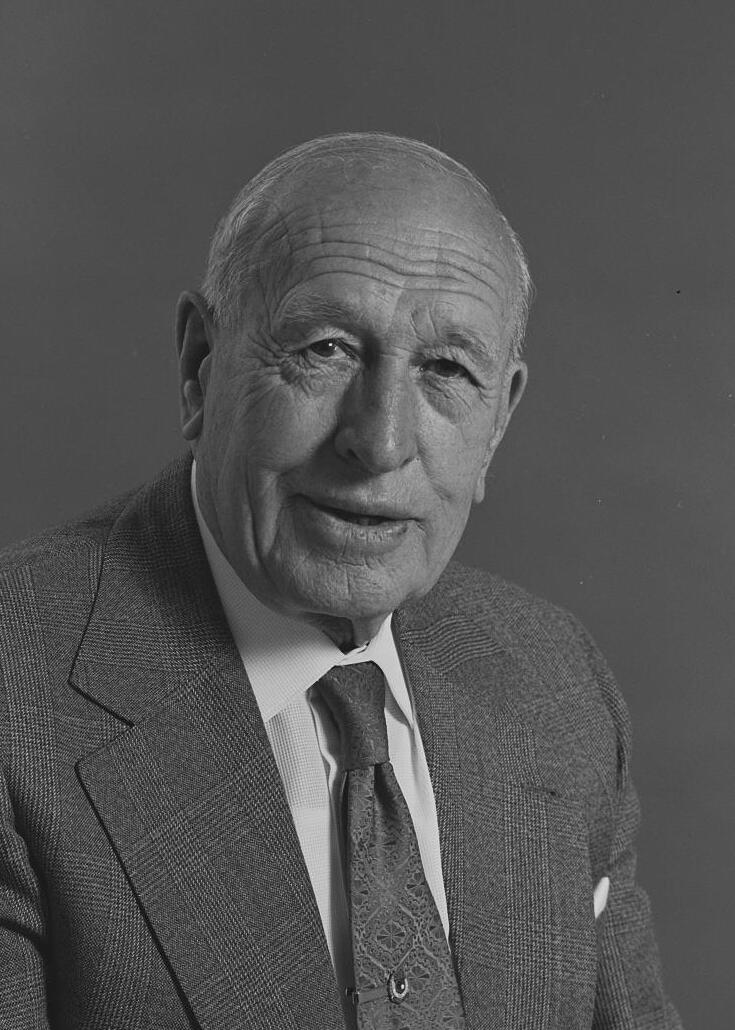
Bunton in 1975

Bunton would have remained an uncontroversial local administrator but for the resignation of the Australian Labor Party Senator for New South Wales, Lionel Murphy, on 9 February 1975, to take up an appointment as a justice of the High Court.

Convention dictated that Federal Senate casual vacancies were filled by someone nominated by the same political party. However, on 27 February, the New South Wales Liberal Party Premier, Tom Lewis, defied the convention by appointing Bunton, who was not affiliated with any party. Facing a hostile Labor Party (and a sometimes hostile electorate), Bunton surprised many observers by acting independently rather than as a Liberal appointee, and resisted urgings from the Malcolm Fraser-led Opposition to block the supply bills of Prime Minister Gough Whitlam's government, instead supporting Labor on the supply bills during the 1975 Australian constitutional crisis.

Bunton chose not to contest the ensuing election. The controversy surrounding his appointment, as well as that of Albert Field, prompted an amendment to the Constitution, requiring that casual Senate vacancies be filled by a member of the same party.

== Honours ==
For his services, Bunton was made an Officer of the Order of the British Empire (OBE) in 1954, and an Officer of the Order of Australia (AO) in 1975. He also received an honorary degree from Charles Sturt University. He was made a member of the Ovens & Murray Football League Hall Of Fame, and had a football oval (Bunton Park) and street in North Albury named after him. A ward in the Albury Base Hospital named in his honour, as was a variety of chrysanthemum.

In recognition of his years of service to his home city, Bunton was occasionally known by the sobriquet "Mr Albury".

== Bibliography ==
- Goodbye Mr Albury, Herald Sun, Melbourne. 4 February 1999.
- Hansard Senate 15 February 1999, see pp 1858 onwards

Civic offices
Preceded by Doug Padman	Mayor of Albury; 1946–1960	Succeeded by John King
Preceded by John King	Mayor of Albury; 1961–1972	Succeeded by Tom Pearsall
Preceded by Tom Pearsall	Mayor of Albury; 1974– 1976	Succeeded by Max Barry
