= Fraser Ministry =

Fraser Ministry may refer to:

- First Fraser Ministry
- Second Fraser Ministry
- Third Fraser Ministry
- Fourth Fraser Ministry
