= First Fraser ministry =

50th ministry of government of Australia

- 50th Ministry of Australia

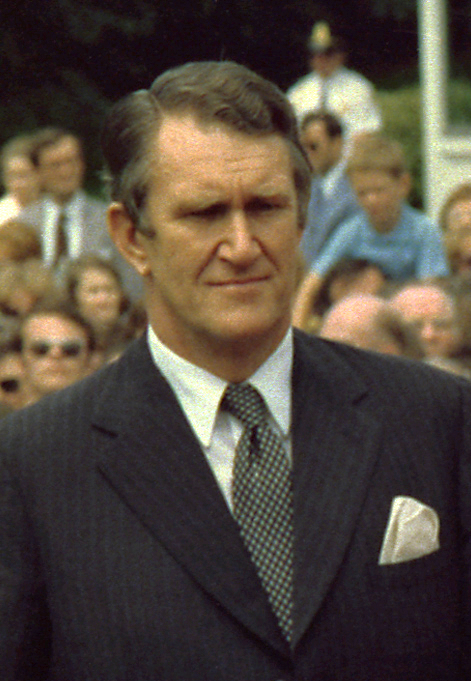
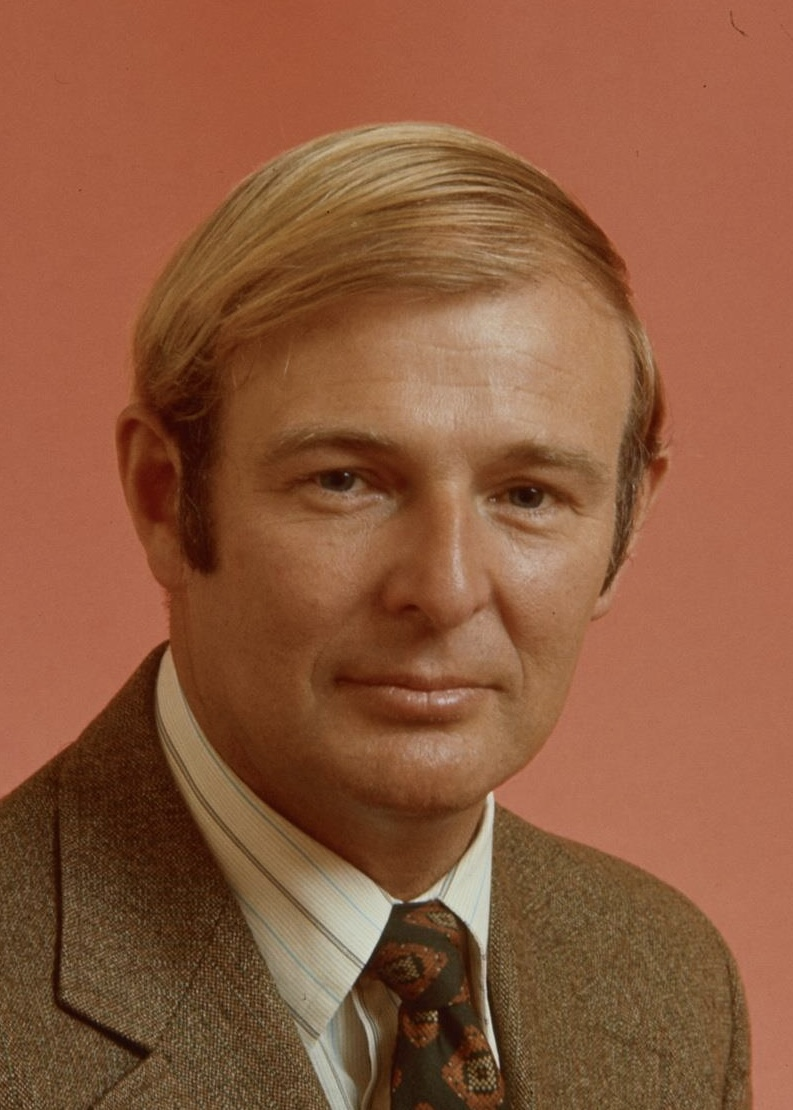
- Malcolm Fraser Doug Anthony
- Date formed: 11 November 1975
- Date dissolved: 22 December 1975

People and organisations
- Monarch: Elizabeth II
- Governor-General: Sir John Kerr
- Prime Minister: Malcolm Fraser
- Deputy Prime Minister: Doug Anthony
- No. of ministers: 15
- Member party: Liberal–National Country coalition
- Status in legislature: Minority government
- Opposition party: Labor
- Opposition leader: Gough Whitlam

History
- Outgoing election: 13 December 1975
- Legislature term: 29th
- Predecessor: Third Whitlam ministry
- Successor: Second Fraser ministry

The first Fraser ministry (Liberal–National Country coalition) was the 50th ministry of the Government of Australia. It was led by Prime Minister, Malcolm Fraser. The first Fraser ministry succeeded the Third Whitlam ministry, which dissolved on 11 November following the dismissal of the Whitlam government by Governor-General Sir John Kerr. As such, it was a caretaker ministry until a federal election could take place. To date, it is the last ministry not to be split between a Cabinet and outer ministry. In the event, the Coalition was ultimately elected on 13 December 1975, and this ministry was replaced by the second Fraser ministry on 22 December 1975.

As of 1 May 2025, Ian Sinclair is the last surviving member of the First Fraser ministry; Sinclair is also the last surviving minister of the Menzies, Holt, McEwen, Gorton, and McMahon governments. Tony Street was the last surviving Liberal member.

== Ministry ==
Party	Minister	Portrait	Portfolio
Liberal	Malcolm Fraser (1930–2015) MP for Wannon (1955–1983)		Prime Minister; Leader of the Liberal Party
National Country	Doug Anthony (1929–2020) MP for Richmond (1957–1984)		Deputy Prime Minister; Leader of the National Country Party; Minister for Overseas Trade
Liberal	Phillip Lynch (1933–1984) MP for Flinders (1966–1982)		Deputy Leader of the Liberal Party; Treasurer
National Country	Ian Sinclair (born 1929) MP for New England (1963–1998)		Deputy Leader of the National Country Party; Minister for Agriculture; Minister for Northern Australia
Liberal	Reg Withers (1924–2014) Senator for Western Australia (1968–1987)		Leader of the Government in the Senate; Special Minister of State; Minister for the Capital Territory; Minister for the Media; Minister for Tourism and Recreation; Vice-President of the Executive Council
Liberal	Ivor Greenwood (1926–1976) Senator for Victoria (1968–1976)		Attorney-General; Minister for Police and Customs
Liberal	Bob Cotton (1915–2006) Senator for New South Wales (1965–1978)		Minister for Manufacturing Industry; Minister for Science and Consumer Affairs
National Country	Peter Nixon (1928–2025) MP for Gippsland (1961–1983)		Minister for Transport; Postmaster-General
Liberal	Andrew Peacock (1939–2021) MP for Kooyong (1966–1994)		Minister for Foreign Affairs; Minister for the Environment
Liberal	Don Chipp (1925–2006) MP for Hotham (1969–1977)		Minister for Social Security; Minister for Health; Minister for Repatriation and Compensation
Liberal	James Killen (1925–2007) MP for Moreton (1955–1983)		Minister for Defence
National Country	Tom Drake-Brockman DFC (1919–1992) Senator for Western Australia (1959–1978)		Minister for Aboriginal Affairs; Minister for Administrative Services
Liberal	John Carrick (1918–2018) Senator for New South Wales (1971–1987)		Minister for Housing and Construction; Minister for Urban and Regional Development
Liberal	Tony Street (1926–2022) MP for Corangamite (1966–1984)		Minister for Labour and Immigration
Liberal	Margaret Guilfoyle (1926–2020) Senator for Victoria (1971–1987)		Minister for Education

== See also ==
- Second Fraser ministry
- Third Fraser ministry
- Fourth Fraser ministry
