= Fourth Fraser ministry =

53rd ministry of government of Australia

- 53rd Ministry of Australia

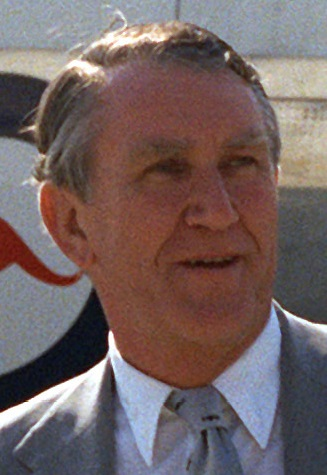
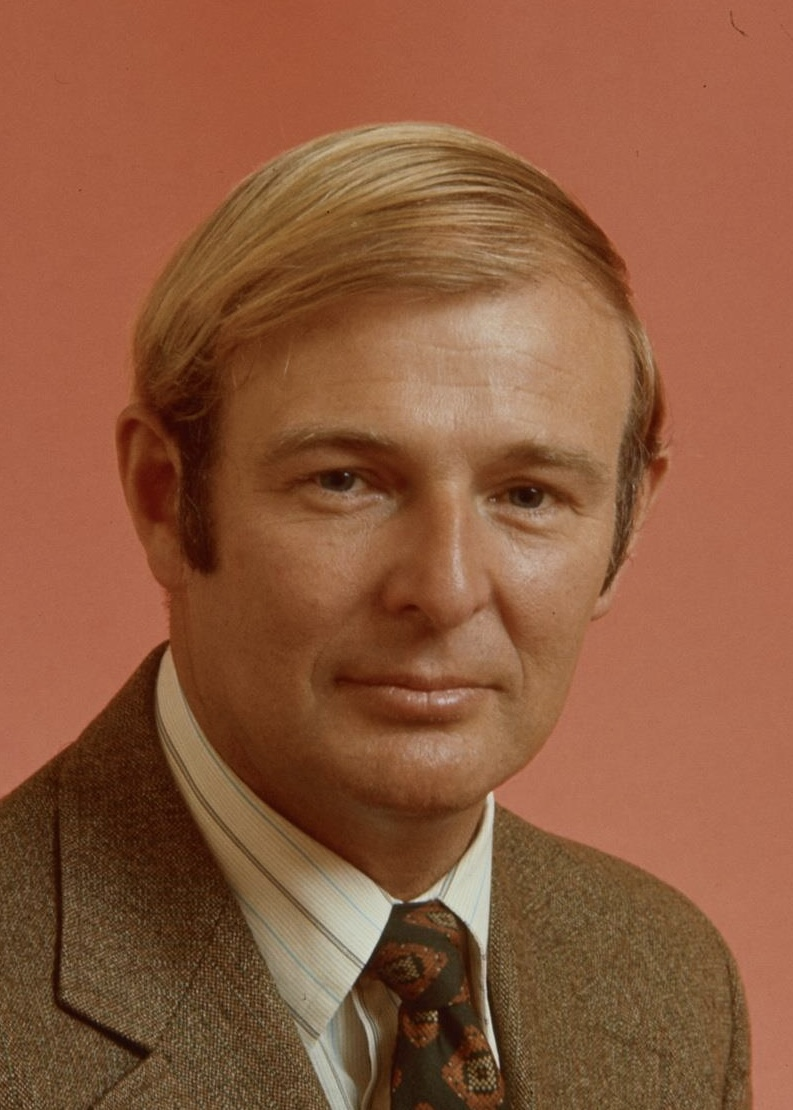
- Malcolm Fraser Doug Anthony
- Date formed: 3 November 1980
- Date dissolved: 11 March 1983

People and organisations
- Monarch: Elizabeth II
- Governor-General: Sir Zelman Cowen; Sir Ninian Stephen
- Prime Minister: Malcolm Fraser
- Deputy Prime Minister: Doug Anthony
- No. of ministers: 30
- Member party: Liberal–National Country/National coalition
- Status in legislature: Majority government
- Opposition party: Labor
- Opposition leader: Bill Hayden; Bob Hawke

History
- Election: 18 October 1980
- Outgoing election: 5 March 1983
- Legislature term: 32nd
- Predecessor: Third Fraser ministry
- Successor: First Hawke ministry

The Fourth Fraser ministry (Liberal–National Country/National coalition) was the 53rd ministry of the Government of Australia. It was led by the country's 22nd Prime Minister, Malcolm Fraser. The Fourth Fraser ministry succeeded the Third Fraser ministry, which dissolved on 3 November 1980 following the federal election that took place in October. The ministry was replaced by the first Hawke ministry on 11 March 1983 following the federal election that took place on 5 March which saw Labor defeat the Coalition.

== Cabinet ==
Party	Minister	Portrait	Portfolio
Liberal	Malcolm Fraser (1930–2015) MP for Wannon (1955–1983)		Prime Minister; Leader of the Liberal Party
National Country/Nationals	Doug Anthony (1929–2020) MP for Richmond (1957–1984)		Deputy Prime Minister; Leader of the National Country Party (to 16 October 1982); Leader of the National Party (from 16 October 1982); Minister for Trade and Resources
Liberal	Sir Phillip Lynch (1933–1984) MP for Flinders (1966–1982)		Deputy Leader of the Liberal Party (to 8 April 1982); Minister for Industry and Commerce (to 11 October 1982)
National Country/Nationals	Ian Sinclair (born 1929) MP for New England (1963–1998)		Deputy Leader of the National Country Party (to 16 October 1982); Deputy Leader of the National Party (from 16 October 1982); Minister for Communications (to 7 May 1982); Minister for Defence (from 7 May 1982); Leader of the House (to 7 May 1982)
Liberal	Sir John Carrick (1918–2018) Senator for New South Wales (1971–1987)		Leader of the Government in the Senate; Minister for National Development and Energy; Vice-President of the Executive Council (to 7 May 1982)
Liberal	Tony Street (1926–2022) MP for Corangamite (1966–1984)		Minister for Foreign Affairs
National Country/Nationals	Peter Nixon (1928–2025) MP for Gippsland (1961–1983)		Minister for Primary Industry
Liberal	John Howard (born 1939) MP for Bennelong (1974–2007)		Deputy Leader of the Liberal Party (from 8 April 1982); Treasurer
Liberal	Andrew Peacock (1939–2021) MP for Kooyong (1966–1994)		Minister for Industrial Relations (to 16 April 1981); Minister for Industry and Commerce (from 11 October 1982)
Liberal	Sir James Killen (1925–2007) MP for Moreton (1955–1983)		Minister for Defence (to 7 May 1982); Vice-President of the Executive Council (from 7 May 1982); Leader of the House (from 7 May 1982)
Liberal	Dame Margaret Guilfoyle (1926–2020) Senator for Victoria (1971–1987)		Minister for Finance
Liberal	Ian Viner (born 1933) MP for Stirling (1972–1983) (in Cabinet until 7 May 1982)		Minister for Employment and Youth Affairs (to 16 April 1981); Minister assisting the Prime Minister (to 7 May 1982); Minister for Industrial Relations (from 16 April 1981 to 7 May 1982); Minister for Defence Support (from 7 May 1982)
Liberal	Peter Durack (1926–2008) Senator for Western Australia (1971–1993)		Attorney-General
Liberal	Fred Chaney (born 1941) Senator for Western Australia (1974–1990)		Minister for Social Security
Liberal	Wal Fife (1929–2017) MP for Farrer (1975–1984) (in Cabinet from 16 April 1981)		Minister for Education (to 7 May 1982); Minister Assisting the Prime Minister in Federal Affairs; Minister for Aviation (from 7 May 1982); Minister Assisting the Prime Minister in Public Service Matters (from 7 May 1982)
Liberal	Ian Macphee (born 1938) MP for Balaclava (1974–1984) (in Cabinet from 7 May 1982)		Minister for Immigration and Ethnic Affairs (to 7 May 1982); Minister for Employment and Industrial Relations (from 7 May 1982)
Liberal	Peter Baume (born 1935) Senator for New South Wales (1974–1991) (in Cabinet from 7 May 1982)		Chief Government Whip in the Senate (to 25 November 1980); Minister for Aboriginal Affairs (to 7 May 1982); Minister assisting the Minister for National Development and Energy (to 7 May 1982); Minister for Health (from 20 April 1982 to 7 May 1982); Minister for Education (from 7 May 1982)

== Outer ministry ==
Party	Minister	Portrait	Portfolio
Liberal	Bob Ellicott (1927–2022) MP for Wentworth (1974–1981)		Minister for Home Affairs and Environment (to 17 February 1981)
National Country/Nationals	Ralph Hunt (1928–2011) MP for Gwydir (1969–1989)		Minister for Transport (to 7 May 1982); Minister for Transport and Construction (from 7 May 1982)
Liberal	Michael MacKellar (1938–2015) MP for Warringah (1969–1994)		Minister for Health (to 20 April 1982); Minister for Home Affairs and Environment (from 17 February 1981 to 19 March 1981)
National Country/Nationals	David Thomson (1924–2013) MP for Leichhardt (1975–1983)		Minister for Science and Technology
Liberal	Kevin Newman (1933–1999) MP for Bass (1975–1984)		Minister for Administrative Services; Minister assisting the Minister for Defence (to 7 May 1982)
Liberal	John Moore (1936–2025) MP for Ryan (1975–2001)		Minister for Business and Consumer Affairs (to 20 April 1982)
Liberal	Michael Hodgman (1938–2013) MP for Denison (1975–1987)		Minister for the Capital Territory; Minister assisting the Minister for Industry and Commerce
Liberal	Tony Messner (1939–2024) Senator for South Australia (1975–1990)		Minister for Veterans' Affairs; Minister assisting the Treasurer
National Country/Nationals	Tom McVeigh (born 1930) MP for Darling Downs (1972–1984)		Minister for Housing and Construction (to 7 May 1982); Minister for Home Affairs and Environment (from 7 May 1982); Minister assisting the Minister for Trade and Resources
Liberal	Ian Wilson (1932–2013) MP for Sturt (1972–1993) (in Ministry from 19 March 1981)		Minister for Home Affairs and Environment (19 March 1981 to 7 May 1982); Minister for Aboriginal Affairs (from 7 May 1982); Minister assisting the Minister for Social Security (from 7 May 1982)
Liberal	Neil Brown (born 1940) MP for Diamond Valley (1975–1983) (in Ministry from 16 April 1981)		Minister for Employment and Youth Affairs (from 16 April 1981 to 7 May 1982); Minister for Business and Consumer Affairs (from 20 April 1982 to 7 May 1982); Minister for Communications (from 7 May 1982); Minister assisting the Attorney-General (from 7 May 1982)
Liberal	Jim Carlton (1935–2015) MP for Mackellar (1977–1994) (in Ministry from 7 May 1982)		Minister for Health (from 7 May 1982); Minister assisting the Minister for National Development and Energy (from 7 May 1982)
Liberal	John Hodges (1937–2024) MP for Petrie (1974–1983) (in Ministry from 7 May 1982)		Minister for Immigration and Ethnic Affairs (from 7 May 1982)

== See also ==
- First Fraser ministry
- Second Fraser ministry
- Third Fraser ministry
