= Third Fraser ministry =

52nd ministry of government of Australia

- 52nd Ministry of Australia

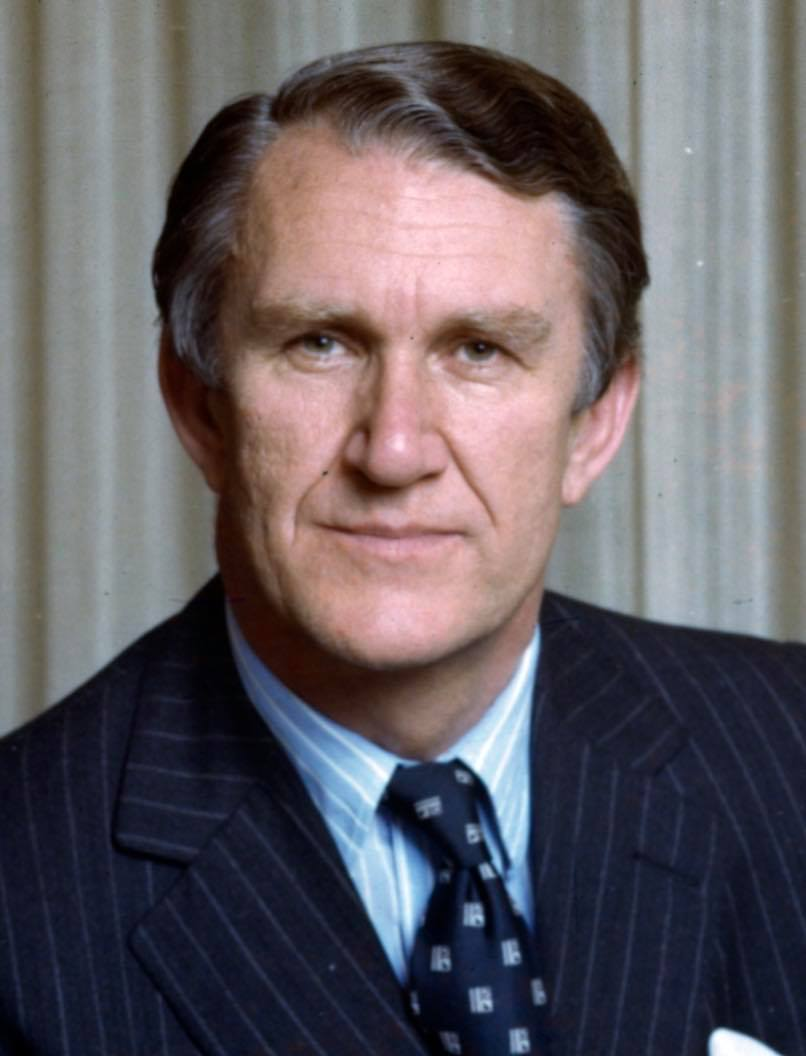
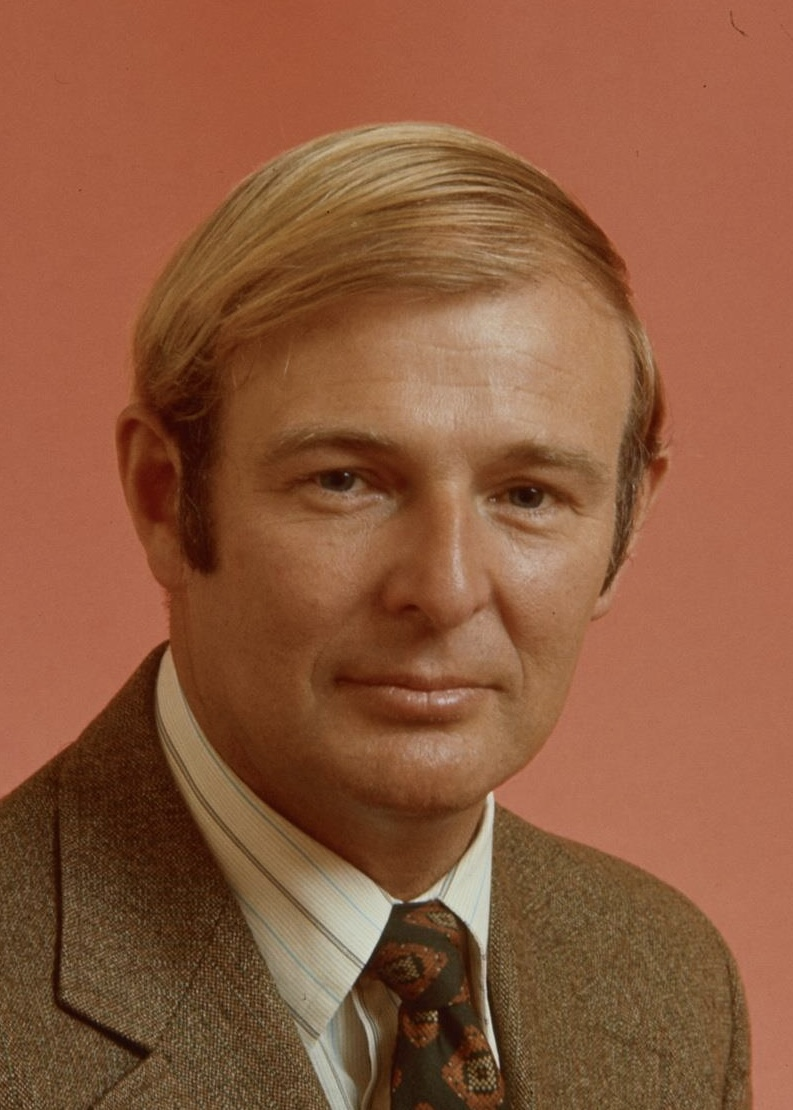
- Malcolm Fraser Doug Anthony
- Date formed: 20 December 1977
- Date dissolved: 3 November 1980

People and organisations
- Monarch: Elizabeth II
- Governor-General: Sir Zelman Cowen
- Prime Minister: Malcolm Fraser
- Deputy Prime Minister: Doug Anthony
- No. of ministers: 30
- Member party: Liberal–National Country coalition
- Status in legislature: Majority government
- Opposition party: Labor
- Opposition leader: Bill Hayden

History
- Election: 10 December 1977
- Outgoing election: 18 October 1980
- Legislature term: 31st
- Predecessor: Second Fraser ministry
- Successor: Fourth Fraser ministry

The third Fraser ministry (Liberal–National Country coalition) was the 52nd ministry of the Government of Australia. It was led by the country's 22nd Prime Minister, Malcolm Fraser. The third Fraser ministry succeeded the second Fraser ministry, which dissolved on 20 December 1977 following the federal election that took place on 10 December. The ministry was replaced by the fourth Fraser ministry on 3 November 1980 following the 1980 federal election.

As of 1 May 2025, John Howard and Ian Viner are the last surviving Liberal members of the Cabinet of the third Fraser ministry, while Ian Sinclair is the last surviving NCP member.

== Cabinet ==
Party	Minister	Portrait	Portfolio
Liberal	Malcolm Fraser (1930–2015) MP for Wannon (1955–1983)		Prime Minister; Leader of the Liberal Party
National Country	Doug Anthony (1929–2020) MP for Richmond (1957–1984)		Deputy Prime Minister; Leader of the National Country Party; Minister for Trade and Resources
Liberal	Phillip Lynch (1933–1984) MP for Flinders (1966–1982)		Deputy Leader of the Liberal Party; Minister for Industry and Commerce
National Country	Ian Sinclair (born 1929) MP for New England (1963–1998)		Deputy Leader of the National Country Party; Minister for Primary Industry (to 27 September 1979); Minister for Special Trade Negotiations (from 19 August 1980); Leader of the House (to 27 September 1979; from 19 August 1980)
Liberal	Reg Withers (1924–2014) Senator for Western Australia (1968–1987)		Leader of the Government in the Senate (to 7 August 1978); Minister for Administrative Services (to 7 August 1978); Vice-President of the Executive Council (to 7 August 1978)
Liberal	Tony Street (1926–2022) MP for Corangamite (1966–1984)		Minister for Employment and Industrial Relations (to 5 December 1978); Minister for Industrial Relations (from 5 December 1978)
National Country	Peter Nixon (1928–2025) MP for Gippsland (1961–1983)		Minister for Transport (to 8 December 1979); Minister for Primary Industry (from 27 September 1979)
Liberal	John Howard (born 1939) MP for Bennelong (1974–2007)		Treasurer; Minister for Finance (from 23 February 1979 to 27 February 1979)
Liberal	John Carrick (1918–2018) Senator for New South Wales (1971–1987)		Leader of the Government in the Senate (from 7 August 1978); Minister for Education (to 8 December 1979); Minister assisting the Prime Minister in Federal Affairs (to 25 August 1978); Vice-President of the Executive Council (from 7 August 1978); Minister for National Development and Energy (from 8 December 1979)
Liberal	Andrew Peacock (1939–2021) MP for Kooyong (1966–1994)		Minister for Foreign Affairs
Liberal	James Killen (1925–2007) MP for Moreton (1955–1983)		Minister for Defence
Liberal	Margaret Guilfoyle (1926–2020) Senator for Victoria (1971–1987)		Minister for Social Security
Liberal	Eric Robinson (1929–1981) MP for McPherson (1972–1981)		Minister for Finance (to 23 February 1979; from 27 February 1979)
Liberal	Ian Viner (born 1933) MP for Stirling (1972–1983)		Minister for Aboriginal Affairs (to 5 December 1978); Minister assisting the Prime Minister (to 8 December 1979); Minister for Employment and Youth Affairs (from 5 December 1978); Leader of the House (from 27 September 1979 to 19 August 1980)
Liberal	Peter Durack (1926–2008) Senator for Western Australia (1971–1993) (in Cabinet from 25 August 1978)		Attorney-General; Minister for Administrative Services (from 7 August 1978 to 25 August 1978)
National Country	Ralph Hunt (1928–2011) MP for Gwydir (1969–1989) (in Cabinet from 8 December 1979)		Minister for Health (to 8 December 1979); Minister for Transport (from 8 December 1979)

== Outer ministry ==
Party	Minister	Portrait	Portfolio
Liberal	Michael MacKellar (1938–2015) MP for Warringah (1969–1994)		Minister for Immigration and Ethnic Affairs (to 8 December 1979); Minister assisting the Treasurer (from 25 August 1978 to 8 December 1979); Minister for Health (from 8 December 1979); Minister assisting the Prime Minister (from 8 December 1979)
National Country	Evan Adermann (1927–2001) MP for Fisher (1972–1984)		Minister for the Northern Territory (to 28 September 1978); Minister assisting the Minister for Primary Industry; Minister for Veterans' Affairs (from 4 July 1978)
Liberal	John McLeay (1922–2000) MP for Boothby (1966–1981)		Minister for Construction (to 5 December 1978); Minister assisting the Minister for Defence; Minister for Administrative Services (from 5 December 1978)
Liberal	Kevin Newman (1933–1999) MP for Bass (1975–1984)		Minister for National Development (to 8 December 1979); Minister assisting the Prime Minister in Federal Affairs (from 8 December 1979); Minister for Productivity (from 8 December 1979)
National Country	James Webster (1925–2022) Senator for Victoria (1964–1980)		Minister for Science (to 5 December 1978); Minister for Science and the Environment (from 5 December 1978 to 8 December 1979)
Liberal	Tony Staley (1939–2023) MP for Chisholm (1970–1980)		Minister for Post and Telecommunications
Liberal	Ian Macphee (born 1938) MP for Balaclava (1974–1984)		Minister for Productivity (to 8 December 1979); Minister assisting the Minister for Industry and Commerce (from 5 December 1978 to 8 December 1979); Minister for Immigration and Ethnic Affairs (from 8 December 1979); Minister assisting the Treasurer (from 8 December 1979)
Liberal	Wal Fife (1929–2017) MP for Farrer (1975–1984)		Minister for Business and Consumer Affairs (to 8 December 1979); Minister assisting the Prime Minister in Federal Affairs (from 25 August 1978 to 8 December 1979); Minister for Education (from 8 December 1979)
Liberal	Vic Garland (1934–2022) MP for Curtin (1969–1981)		Minister for Veterans' Affairs (to 4 July 1978); Minister for Special Trade Representations (to 8 December 1979); Minister for Business and Consumer Affairs (from 8 December 1979); Minister assisting the Minister for Industry and Commerce (from 8 December 1979)
Liberal	Bob Ellicott (1927–2022) MP for Wentworth (1974–1981)		Minister for Home Affairs; Minister for the Capital Territory
Liberal	Ray Groom (born 1944) MP for Braddon (1975–1984)		Minister for Environment, Housing and Community Development (to 5 December 1978); Minister assisting the Minister for Employment and Industrial Relations (to 5 December 1978); Minister for Housing and Construction (from 5 December 1978)
Liberal	Fred Chaney (born 1941) Senator for Western Australia (1974–1990) (in Ministry from 25 August 1978)		Chief Government Whip in the Senate (to 28 February 1978); Minister for Administrative Services (from 25 August 1978 to 5 December 1978); Minister assisting the Minister for Education (from 25 August 1978 to 8 December 1979); Minister for Aboriginal Affairs (from 5 December 1978); Minister assisting the Minister for National Development and Energy (from 8 December 1979)
National Country	Douglas Scott (1920–2012) Senator for New South Wales (1974–1985) (in Ministry from 8 December 1979)		Minister for Special Trade Representations (from 8 December 1979 to 19 August 1980); Minister assisting the Minister for Trade and Resources (from 8 December 1979 to 19 August 1980)
National Country	David Thomson (1924–2013) MP for Leichhardt (1975–1983) (in Ministry from 8 December 1979)		Minister for Science and the Environment (from 8 December 1979)

== See also ==
- First Fraser ministry
- Second Fraser ministry
- Fourth Fraser ministry
