= Bob Ellicott =

Australian politician and judge (1927–2022)

The Honourable Bob Ellicott AC, KC
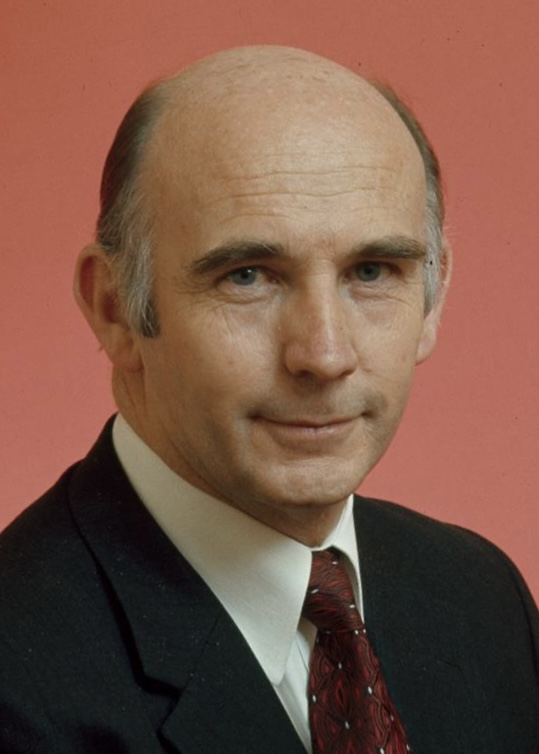
- Ellicott in 1974

Judge of the Federal Court of Australia
- In office 2 March 1981 – 24 February 1983

Attorney-General of Australia
- In office 22 December 1975 – 6 September 1977
- Prime Minister: Malcolm Fraser
- Preceded by: Kep Enderby
- Succeeded by: Peter Durack

Solicitor-General of Australia
- In office 1969–1973
- Prime Minister: John Gorton; William McMahon; Gough Whitlam
- Preceded by: Anthony Mason
- Succeeded by: Maurice Byers

Minister for Home Affairs and the Environment
- In office 3 November 1980 – 17 February 1981
- Prime Minister: Malcolm Fraser
- Preceded by: Himself (Home Affairs); David Thomson (Environment)
- Succeeded by: Michael MacKellar

Minister for Home Affairs
- In office 20 December 1977 – 3 November 1980
- Prime Minister: Malcolm Fraser
- Preceded by: New position
- Succeeded by: Himself

Minister for the Capital Territory
- In office 20 December 1977 – 3 November 1980
- Prime Minister: Malcolm Fraser
- Preceded by: Tony Staley
- Succeeded by: Michael Hodgman

Member of the Australian Parliament for Wentworth
- In office 18 May 1974 – 17 February 1981
- Preceded by: Les Bury
- Succeeded by: Peter Coleman

Personal details
- Born: 15 April 1927 Moree, New South Wales, Australia
- Died: 31 October 2022 (aged 95)
- Party: Liberal
- Education: University of Sydney
- Occupation: Barrister

Robert James Ellicott, AC, KC (15 April 1927 – 31 October 2022) was an Australian barrister, politician and judge. He served as Solicitor-General of Australia (1969–1973) before entering the House of Representatives at the 1974 federal election as a member of the Liberal Party. He held senior ministerial office in the Fraser government, serving as Attorney-General (1975–1977), Minister for Home Affairs (1977–1980), the Capital Territory (1977–1980), and Home Affairs and the Environment (1980–1981). He retired from politics to be appointed to the Federal Court of Australia, serving as a judge from 1981 to 1983.

== Early life ==
Ellicott was born on 15 April 1927 in Moree, New South Wales. He attended Fort Street High School and the University of Sydney, graduating Bachelor of Arts and Bachelor of Laws.

Ellicott was admitted to the New South Wales Bar in 1950 and was Solicitor-General of Australia from 1969 to 1973. He was appointed Queen's Counsel (QC) in 1964. As solicitor-general, Ellicott "played a major role in leading the High Court to significantly more liberal interpretations of Commonwealth powers vis-a-vis the States".

== Politics ==
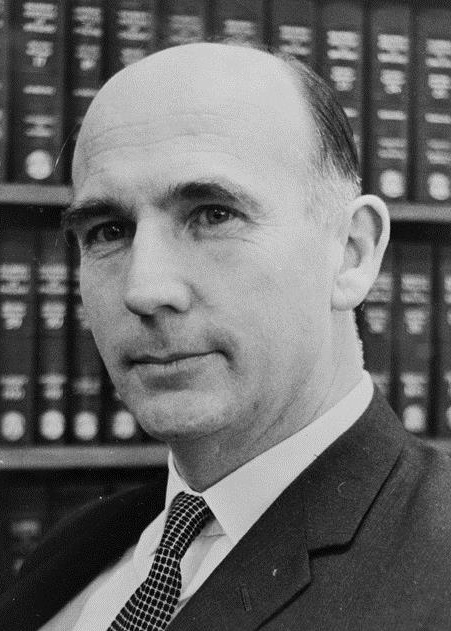
Ellicott in 1970

Ellicott was elected as the Liberal member for the Division of Wentworth in the 1974 election. He was Attorney-General in the Fraser Ministry from 1975 to 1977. Ellicott resigned as Attorney-General as a result of a dispute with Malcolm Fraser over the payment of costs in the Sankey v Whitlam case, where he believed that the Commonwealth should have paid the costs of the private individual, Danny Sankey, as well as those of the politicians, Gough Whitlam, Rex Connor, Jim Cairns and Lionel Murphy, but Fraser disagreed.

Ellicott was reappointed to the third Fraser Ministry (1977 to 1980) as Minister for Home Affairs and Minister for the Capital Territory. As home affairs minister he played a key role in the establishment of the Australian Institute of Sport (AIS), prompted by Australia's poor performance at the 1976 Summer Olympics. In 1978 he also cancelled Film Australia's funding of a film adaptation of The Unknown Industrial Prisoner on the grounds it was uncommercial, a rare instance of political interference in the Australian film industry. He was later Minister for Home Affairs and the Environment from November 1980 until his resignation on 17 February 1981 to become a judge on the Federal Court of Australia.

Ellicott is the only person to serve both as Solicitor-General and Attorney-General.

== Judicial career and later activities ==
Ellicott is one of only six politicians to have served in both the Parliament of Australia and the Federal Court of Australia, along with Nigel Bowen, Merv Everett, Tony Whitlam, John Reeves and Duncan Kerr. He resigned from the court in February 1983, in order to return to the bar and "to take an interest in public affairs again". Writing for The Canberra Times, Jack Waterford assessed him as an "outstanding judge" who had "particularly demonstrated his ability, and his radicalism, in his work in administrative law – the field that he, as a former Attorney-General, played a considerable role in creating".

As of 2007 he was an arbitrator on the Court of Arbitration for Sport. On 20 November 2007, he was named as chair of the tribunal to investigate allegations of misbehaviour against the suspended Chief Justice of Fiji, Daniel Fatiaki.

== Honours ==
In May 2006, the Australian Olympic Committee awarded him the Olympic Order of Merit, particularly in his role of establishing the Australian Institute of Sport when Minister for Home Affairs. In October 2016, he was inducted as a General Member of the Sport Australia Hall of Fame. In 2017 Ellicott was appointed a Companion of the Order of Australia for eminent service to the Parliament of Australia, particularly as Attorney-General, to legal practice and innovative policy development, to advancements in global trade law, and to the international arbitration of sporting disputes.

== Personal life ==
Ellicott was the double cousin of Sir Garfield Barwick, who like him attended Fort Street and the University of Sydney, was also an Attorney-General, and was later Chief Justice of the High Court of Australia.

Ellicott died on 31 October 2022, at the age of 95.

Political offices
Preceded by Ivor Greenwood	Attorney General of Australia; 1975–1977	Succeeded by Peter Durack
Preceded by Tony Staley	Minister for the Capital Territory; 1977–1980	Succeeded by Michael Hodgman
New title	Minister for Home Affairs; 1977–1980	Succeeded by Michael MacKellar
New title	Minister for Home Affairs and the Environment; 1980–1981	Succeeded by Michael MacKellar
Parliament of Australia
Preceded by Les Bury	Member for Division of Wentworth; 1974–1981	Succeeded by Peter Coleman
Government offices
Preceded by Anthony Mason	Solicitor-General of Australia; 1969–1973	Succeeded by Maurice Byers
