= Tom Drake-Brockman =

Australian politician

The Honourable Sir Tom Drake-Brockman DFC
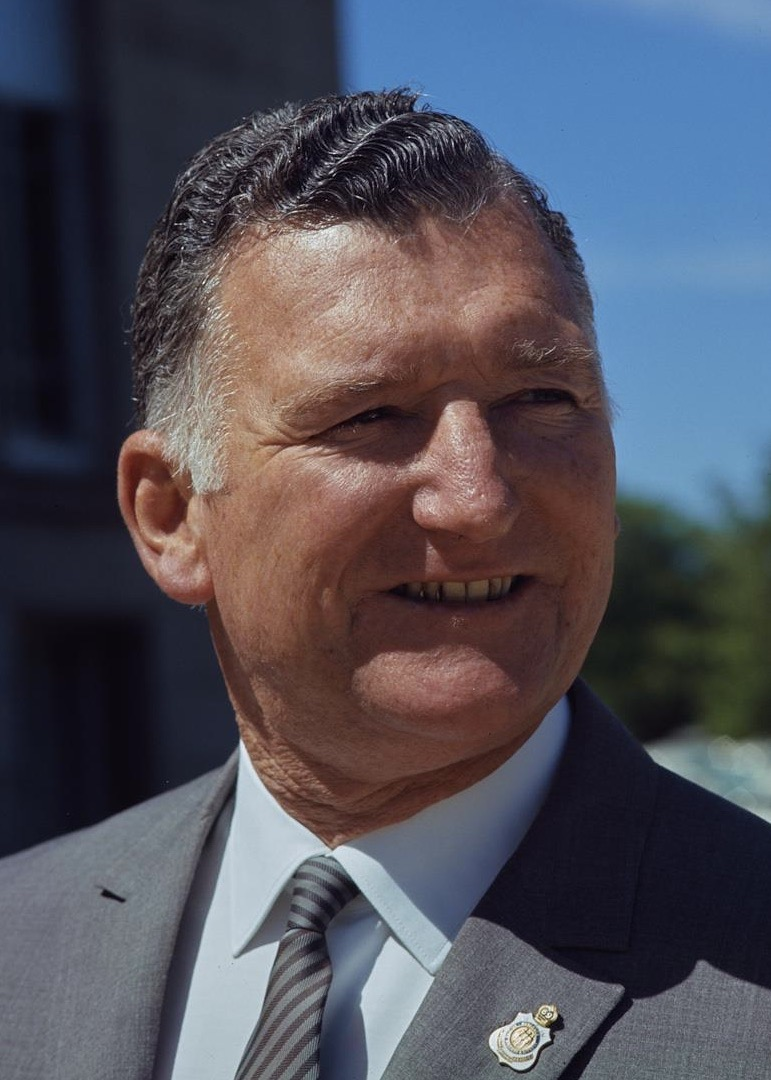
- Drake-Brockman in 1969

Minister for Air
- In office 12 November 1969 – 5 December 1972
- Preceded by: Dudley Erwin
- Succeeded by: Lance Barnard

Deputy President of the Senate
- In office 15 March 1965 – 11 November 1969
- Preceded by: Colin McKellar
- Succeeded by: Tom Bull
- In office 17 February 1976 – 30 June 1978
- Preceded by: James Webster
- Succeeded by: Douglas Scott

Senator for Western Australia
- In office 12 August 1958 – 21 November 1958
- Preceded by: Harrie Seward
- Succeeded by: George Branson
- In office 1 July 1959 – 30 June 1978
- Succeeded by: Allan Rocher

Minister for Aboriginal Affairs Minister for Administrative Services
- In office 11 November 1975 – 22 December 1975
- Preceded by: Les Johnson (Aboriginal Affairs); Fred Daly (Admin. Services)
- Succeeded by: Ian Viner (Aboriginal Affairs); Reg Withers (Admin. Services)

Personal details
- Born: 15 May 1919 Toodyay, Western Australia
- Died: 28 August 1992 (aged 73) Perth, Western Australia
- Party: Australian Country Party and National Alliance
- Spouse: Mary
- Occupation: Air gunner, farmer, politician
- Civilian awards: Knight Bachelor

Military service
- Allegiance: Australia
- Branch/service: Royal Australian Air Force
- Years of service: 1941–1945
- Rank: Flight Lieutenant
- Unit: No. 460 Squadron RAAF
- Battles/wars: Second World War
- Military awards: Distinguished Flying Cross

Sir Thomas Charles Drake-Brockman, DFC (15 May 1919 – 28 August 1992) was an Australian politician who served as a Senator for Western Australia from 1959 to 1978 and also briefly in 1958. He was a member of the National Country Party (Country Party prior to 1974). He served as Minister for Air from 1969 to 1972.

== Early life ==
Drake-Brockman was born on 15 May 1919 in Toodyay, Western Australia. He was the first of six children born to Rosa Ita (née Marrinan) and Robert James Hastie Drake-Brockman. His father was a member of a pioneering Western Australian family, while his mother was a schoolteacher and former novice nun originally from Kilkee, Ireland.

Drake-Brockman was raised on his father's farming properties, including "Mill Farm" situated north of Toodyay, a smaller property at Calingiri, and "Yandee" in the locality of Nunile near Toodyay. He began his education at St Aloysius Convent of Mercy in Toodyay and later attended Toodyay State School. He then boarded at Hale School and Guildford Grammar School in Perth.

== Military service ==
Drake-Brockman enlisted in the Australian Army in 1938 after leaving school, joining the 10th Light Horse Regiment. He had previously been an army cadet. He transferred to the Royal Australian Air Force (RAAF) in February 1941 and qualified as a wireless operator and air gunner. He subsequently undertook further training in England with the Royal Air Force (RAF) as part of the Empire Air Training Scheme.

During the war, Drake-Brockman served in the Middle East, Egypt and Malta with No. 40 Squadron RAF, operating as a rear gunner in Wellington bombers. He was transferred in December 1943 to No. 466 Squadron RAAF where he "flew numerous missions in Halifax bombers over Germany and France". He was awarded the Distinguished Flying Cross in 1944 and was promoted to flight lieutenant in 1945.

== Farming ==
In 1945, following his return from the war, Drake-Brockman went into partnership with his parents and two brothers to acquire the Boodadong estate at Yerecoin, previously owned by Horace Berry. They established a mixed farming property, including cereal crops, sheep, beef cattle and pigs. He was active in the Farmers' Union of Western Australia, serving as president of its wool section from 1956 to 1958 and also as a vice-president of the Australian Wool and Meat Producers' Federation. He promoted "orderly marketing of wool through a national scheme that would ensure the livelihood of the small grower".

== Politics ==
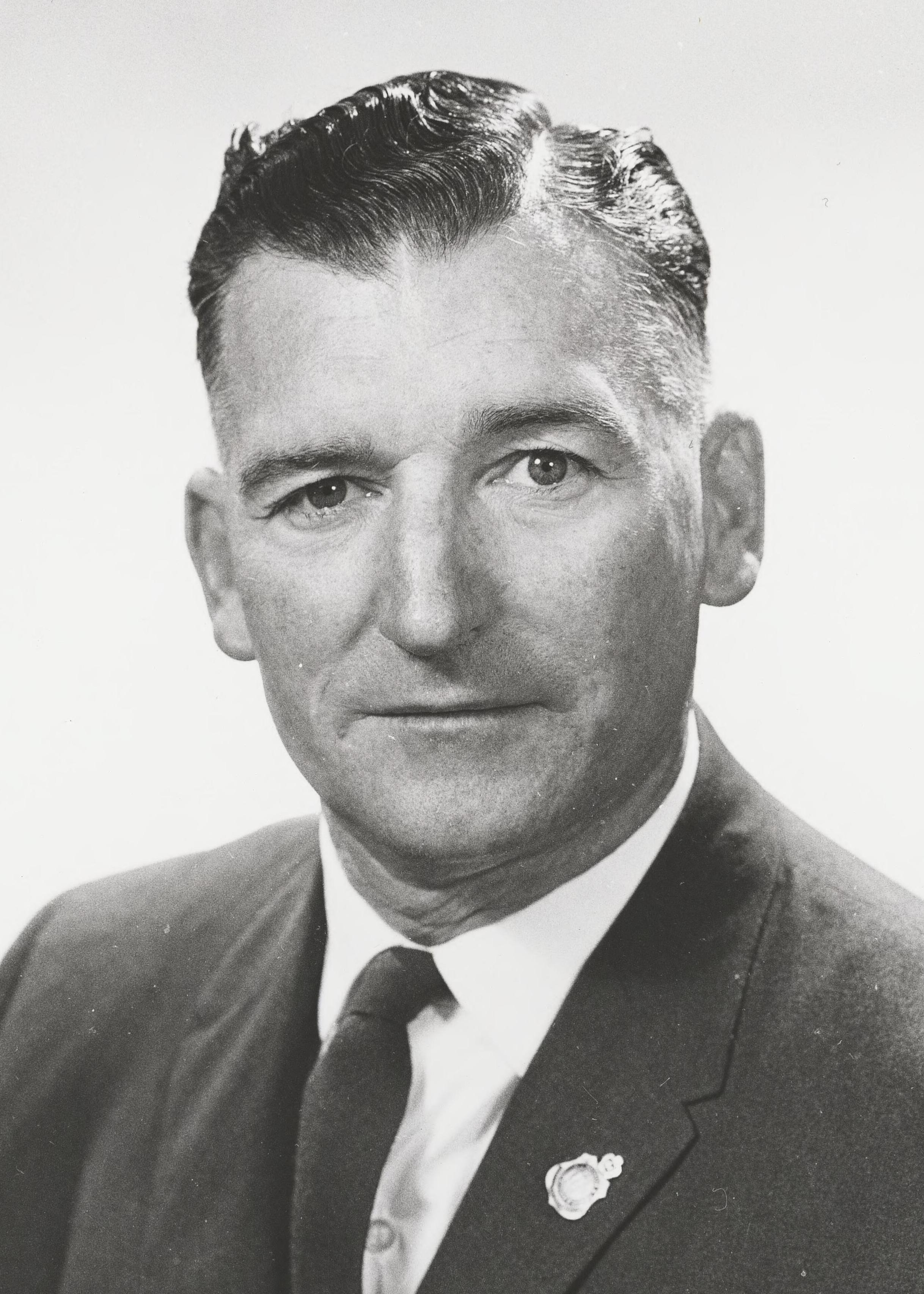
Drake-Brockman in 1961

Drake-Brockman was a founding member of the Yerecoin branch of the Country and Democratic League in 1954. He first nominated for Country Party preselection at the 1958 Western Australian Legislative Council election, but was defeated for endorsement in Midland Province by Charles Simpson.

Drake-Brockman was appointed to a casual vacancy as a Country Party senator on 12 August 1958. His appointment expired at the 1958 election, when he was elected to the Senate, with effect from 1 July 1959. He was appointed Minister for Air in John Gorton's second ministry, as a result of Dudley Erwin's falling out of Gorton's favour. He remained minister until the defeat of the William McMahon government at the 1972 election. He was Minister for Aboriginal Affairs and Minister for Administrative Services in Malcolm Fraser's caretaker government after the dismissal of the Whitlam government, but was not reappointed to Fraser's ministry after the 1975 election. He did not stand for re-election at the 1977 election and his term came to an end on 30 June 1978. To date, he is the last member of what is now the National Party to be elected to the Senate from Western Australia.

Drake-Brockman was made a Knight Bachelor in June 1979.

Drake-Brockman was interviewed in 1985 by John Ferrell for the Parliament's oral history project. The recording can be found at the National Library of Australia.

== Personal life ==
In 1942, while in England, Drake-Brockman married Edith "Mollie" Sykes, a private in the Women's Auxiliary Territorial Service. The couple had five children before divorcing in 1972. He remarried in the same year to Mary Frances McGinnity.

After leaving parliament, Drake-Brockman retired to Lesmurdie on the outskirts of Perth. He was active in the RAAF Association, serving as a senior state vice-president and as chair of the committee overseeing the Aviation Heritage Museum.

Drake-Brockman died at Royal Perth Hospital on 28 August 1992, aged 73.

== Notes ==
Political offices
Preceded by Dudley Erwin	Minister for Air; 1969–1972	Succeeded by Lance Barnard
Preceded by Les Johnson	Minister for Aboriginal Affairs; 1975	Succeeded by Ian Viner
Preceded by Fred Daly	Minister for Administrative Services; 1975	Succeeded by Reg Withers
Party political offices
Preceded by Adrian Solomons	Federal President of the National Country Party; 1978–1981	Succeeded by Shirley McKerrow
