= Fraser government =

Australian government, 1975–1983

Fraser government

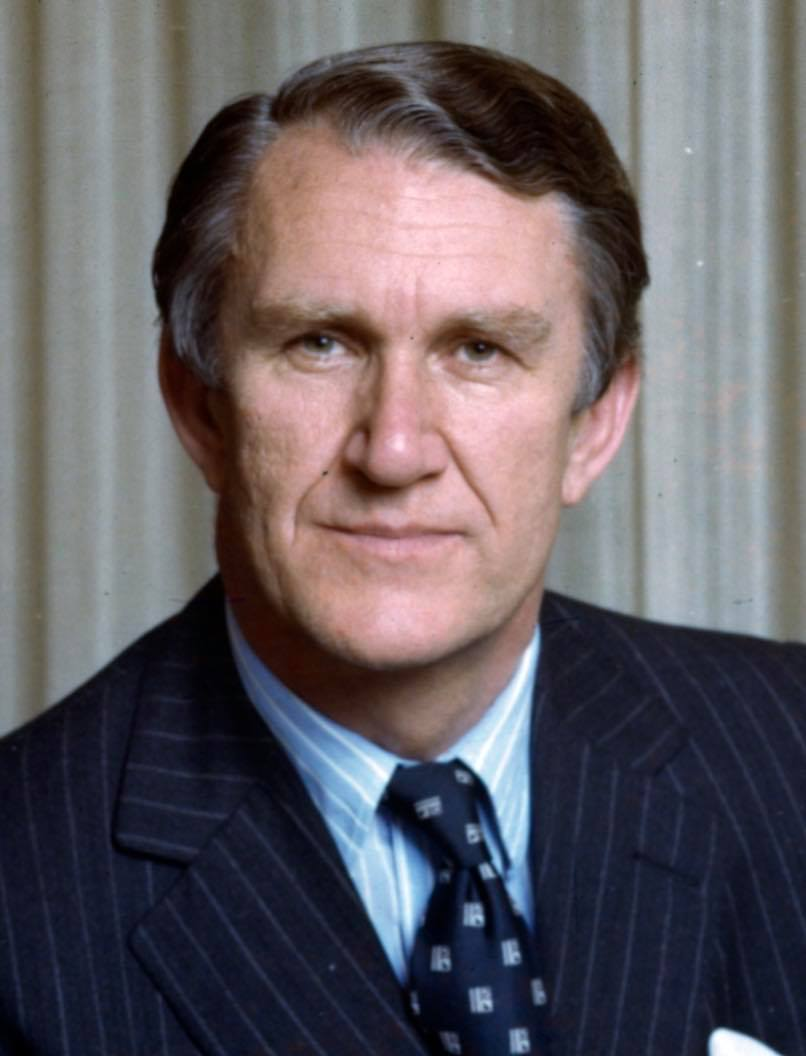

In office
- 11 November 1975 – 11 March 1983
- Monarch: Elizabeth II
- Prime Minister: Malcolm Fraser
- Deputy: Doug Anthony
- Parties: Liberal; National Country
- Status: Minority (to Dec. 1975); Majority (from Dec. 1975)
- Origin: Dismissal of predecessor
- Demise: Lost 1983 election
- Predecessor: Whitlam government
- Successor: Hawke government

The Fraser government was the federal executive government of Australia led by Prime Minister Malcolm Fraser. It was made up of members of a Liberal–Country party coalition in the Australian Parliament from November 1975 to March 1983. Initially appointed as a caretaker government following the dismissal of the Whitlam government, Fraser won in a landslide at the resulting 1975 Australian federal election, and won substantial majorities at the subsequent 1977 and 1980 elections, before losing to the Bob Hawke–led Australian Labor Party in the 1983 election.

== Background ==
Billy Snedden led the Liberal–National Coalition in the 1974 Australian federal election which saw Whitlam Labor government re-elected with a decreased majority in the House of Representatives. Fraser unsuccessfully challenged for the leadership of the Liberal Party in November 1974, then on 21 March 1975, defeated Snedden, with Phillip Lynch remaining Deputy Leader.

=== Dismissal of the Whitlam government ===
Following the 1974–75 Loans Affair in which the Whitlam government operated outside the Loan Council and authorised Minerals and Energy Minister Rex Connor to conduct secret discussions with a loan broker from Pakistan to secure a $US4 billion loan, and the Treasurer, Jim Cairns, had misled parliament over the issue, Fraser told Parliament that the government was incompetent and the opposition Liberal–Country Party Coalition delayed passage of the government's money bills in the Senate, with the intention of forcing the government to an election. Prime Minister Whitlam refused to call an election. The deadlock came to an end when Whitlam was dismissed by the Governor General, John Kerr on 11 November 1975 and Fraser was installed as caretaker Prime Minister, pending an election. At elections held in December 1975, Fraser and the Coalition were elected in a landslide victory.

== First term ==
The 1975 double dissolution election which followed the dismissal of the Whitlam government saw the Liberal Party win 68 seats to Labor's 36, with the newly renamed National Country Party winning 23 seats in the House of Representatives. The election result placed the Liberal Party in a position to govern in its own right. However, Fraser maintained the Coalition, and Nationals leader Doug Anthony became deputy prime minister.

In the Senate, 64 seats were contested and 27 Liberal, 27 Labor and 7 National Party Senators were elected, together with 1 Independent and 1 each from the Liberal Movement and the Country Liberal Party. After winning the 1975 election, Fraser won two subsequent elections: with further substantial majorities in 1977 (67 seats to the Labor Party's 38, with 19 seats going to the National Country Party) and 1980 (Liberals 54 and National Country Party 20 to Labor's 51).

== Policies ==
=== Economics ===
Australia had entered recession and faced high inflation under the later period of the Whitlam government. Fraser maintained that reducing inflation should take priority over reducing unemployment and believed that the economy would benefit from a transfer of resources from the public sector to the private sector. In its early years, the Fraser government sought to address the economic situation by providing businesses with an investment allowance and reduced taxation on mining and on private companies, while it cut expenditure on a range of government services, public service salaries and the arts.

Fraser persuaded his first Treasurer, Phillip Lynch, to resign in 1977 and promoted the young John Howard to the portfolio. Howard also replaced Lynch as deputy leader of the party in 1982. Howard was Fraser's Treasurer from November 1977 and presented five federal budgets. During the 1970s Howard shifted from a protectionist to a free trade position – in the new 'economic rationalist' mould. Howard argued unsuccessfully for the introduction of a broad indirect tax, and in 1982 with an election looming, Howard disagreed with his leader's push for an expansionary budget, while the economy was suffering from the early 1980s recession. The Fraser government sought to reduce expenditure and streamline the public service, but a significant program of economic reform was not pursued. By 1983, the Australian economy was in recession, amidst the effects of a severe drought.

In 1981, following the Australian meat substitution scandal, the government was criticised for its failure to uncover misconduct earlier. The government subsequently announced a royal commission into the meat industry.

=== Social policy ===
The Fraser government maintained many of the social reforms of the Whitlam era, but sought to introduce increased fiscal restraint. It passed the Human Rights Commission Act 1981, which established the Australian Human Rights Commission and gave effect to five international human rights instruments. This government also established the position of Commonwealth Ombudsman in 1977 and introduced Australia's first freedom of information law.

The National Museum of Australia Act 1980 created the National Museum of Australia.

A Liberal minister, Don Chipp had split off from the party to form a new social liberal party, the Australian Democrats in 1977 and the Franklin Dam proposal contributed to the emergence of an influential Environmental movement in Australia.

==== Indigenous affairs ====
The Fraser government included the first Aboriginal federal parliamentarian, Neville Bonner. In 1976, Parliament passed the Aboriginal Land Rights Act 1976, which, while limited to the Northern Territory, affirmed "inalienable" freehold title to some traditional lands.

The Aboriginal Development Commission Act 1980 established the Aboriginal Development Commission (ADC) as a statutory authority in July 1980, under the Department for Aboriginal Affairs and minister Fred Chaney. The ADC was created in order to rationalise the operations of the Aboriginal Land Fund Commission and the Aboriginal Loan Commission, two bodies concerned with assets acquisition, in order to help create commercial enterprises which could earn income for Aboriginal people. The commission's board would consist of 10 members, all Aboriginal, and the new body would employ around 100 people, mostly Aboriginal. The new legislation also gave statutory recognition of the National Aboriginal Conference (NAC), which was made up of Aboriginal people elected in 35 electorates across Australia, for the first time. The NAC, which had been canvassing opinions of Aboriginal people across Australia, would report to the Minister for Aboriginal Affairs on the operation of the commission.

Charles Perkins was inaugural chair, serving from 1981 to 1984, when Shirley McPherson took over. She remained in the position until the ADC ceased operations at the end of 1989. The Commissioners, who worked part-time, were supported by full-time administrative staff who were under the management of a general manager. By the time of its demise, the ADC comprised a head office in Canberra as well as six regional offices and 21 branch offices, and employed 360 staff.

ADC was superseded by the Aboriginal and Torres Strait Islander Commission (ATSIC) in March 1990. Hawke government minister Gerry Hand proposed merging the functions of the ADC into the newly created ATSIC, by establishing a new body, the Aboriginal Economic Development Corporation (AECD).

==== Immigration ====
While prior governments had dismantled the White Australia Policy, it was under the Fraser government that immigration became multiracial. Some 200,000 Asian migrants came to Australia between 1975 and 1982 – of whom 56,000 were Vietnamese refugees, among them around 2000 "boatpeople" who arrived without documents via sea voyages. The Australian Institute of Multicultural Affairs was created and extensive assistance given to resettlement and multiculturalism, including the establishment of the Special Broadcasting Service (SBS).

In late 1975, unrest in Lebanon caused a group of influential Maronite Australians to approach Australian Prime Minister Malcolm Fraser and his immigration minister, Michael MacKellar regarding the resettling of Lebanese civilians with their Australian relatives. Immediate access to Australia could not be granted under normal immigration categories, thus the Lebanese people were categorised as refugees. This was not in the traditional sense as the Lebanese people were not fleeing from persecution but escaping from internal conflict between Muslim and Christian groups. This action was known as the "Lebanon Concession".

Between 1975 and 1990, more than 30,000 civil war refugees arrived in Australia. Most immigrants were Muslim Lebanese from deprived rural areas who learned of Australia's Lebanon Concession and decided to seek a better life. They were Sunnis from northern Lebanon and Shias from southern Lebanon as Christian and Muslim Lebanese were unwilling to leave the capital city, Beirut. Immigrants of the Lebanese Concession primarily settled in south-west Sydney; Sunnis in Lakemba and Shias in Arncliffe.

In November 2016, Immigration Minister, Peter Dutton said that it was a mistake of a previous Liberal administration to have brought out Lebanese Muslim immigrants.

==== Health and welfare ====
Under the Fraser government, both expansions and restrictions in social services were carried out. New forms of cash support for families were introduced, including the Family Allowance in 1976 and the Family Income Supplement in 1982. Indexation for unemployment benefits was also introduced, while a big expansion in the provision of scholarships for secondary school and university students took place, A Mortgage and Rent Relief Scheme was introduced that helped private tenants in need. Settlement services for migrants were expanded, and multicultural resource centres were set up (as noted by one study) “to enable ethnic communities and voluntary agencies to cater to the welfare needs of migrants.” Greater levels of support were provided to facilities for homeless, aged and handicapped persons, while various support schemes for young unemployed persons were launched. The coverage of two existing benefits, the Supporting Mother’s Benefit and Handicapped Children’s Allowance, was extended to more people, pension rates were tied to the Consumer Price Index, and financial responsibility for sole parents in the first 6 months of eligibility was introduced.

On the restrictive side, big reductions in public housing expenditure were carried out while cuts in unemployment benefits were made, such as the abolition of indexation for those over the age of 18, and restrictions on eligibility for these benefits were carried out. A crackdown on invalidity pension eligibility criteria was also made, while labour market programmes were cut. In addition, the real value of benefits for various groups fell, while the Maternity Allowance (a benefit that had been around since 1912) was brought to an end. The Medibank healthcare system set up under the previous Whitlam government was also ended. Taxation of social security pensions and benefits was also introduced while tuition fees for second and higher degrees were reintroduced, and cuts were made in subsidies for aged persons homes, child care services, grants for senior citizens centres, and spending on sickness and unemployment benefits and on legal aid.

=== Government processes ===
The Administrative Appeals Tribunal (AAT) was established by the Administrative Appeals Tribunal Act 1975 and commenced operations on 1 July 1976.

The Fraser government passed the Freedom of Information Act 1982.

=== Territories ===
The Fraser government passed the Northern Territory (Self-Government) Act 1978, which granted self-government to the Northern Territory, and the Norfolk Island Act 1979, which granted self-government to Norfolk Island. In 1978, the government also purchased the Clunies-Ross family's holdings on the Cocos (Keeling) Islands, bringing an end to the family's rule of the territory as a private fiefdom.

=== Foreign policy ===
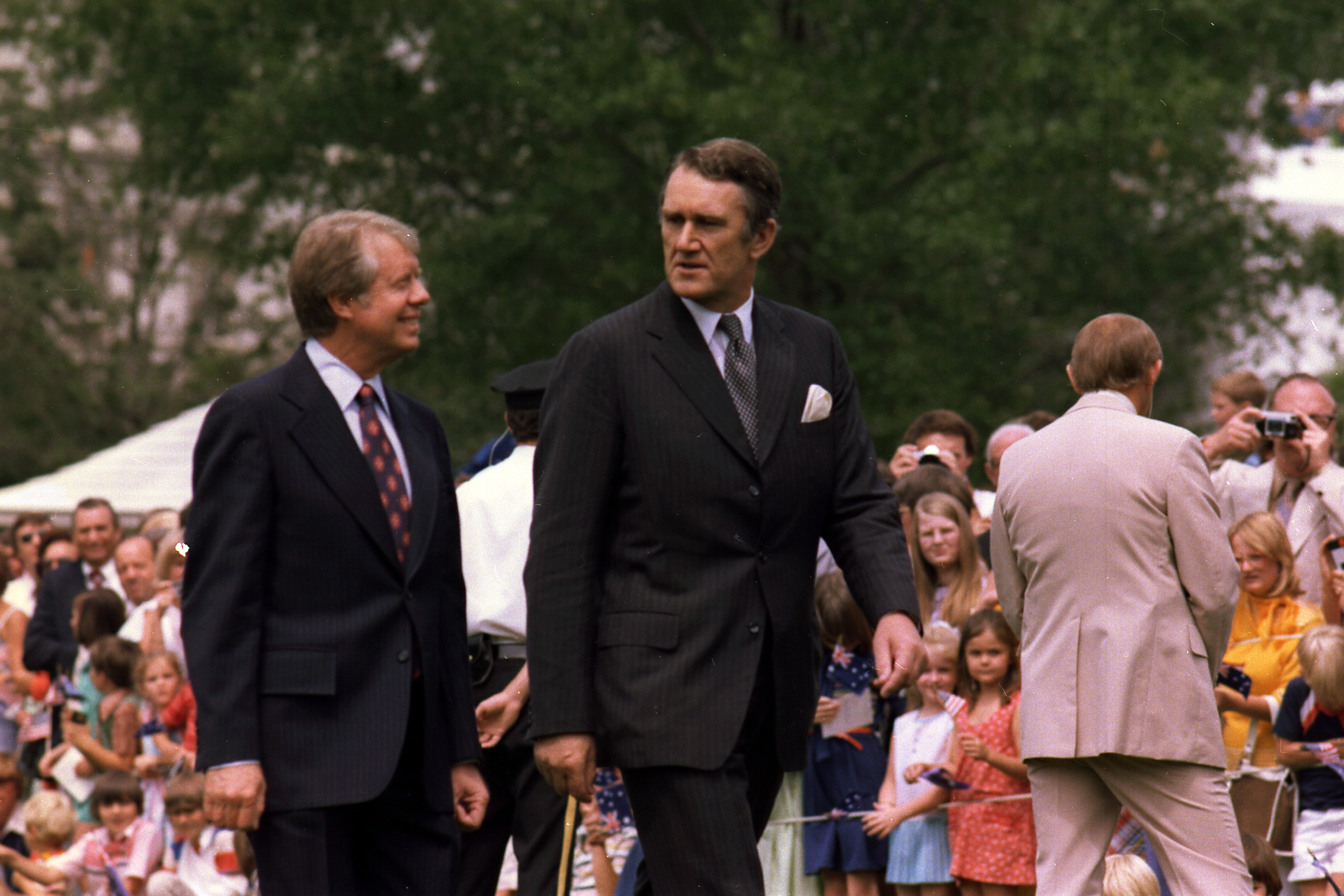
Malcolm Fraser and U.S. President Jimmy Carter (1977).

Fraser travelled widely as Prime Minister. Andrew Peacock and Tony Street each was his Minister for Foreign Affairs.

The Fraser government was in office during a period of change for the Commonwealth of Nations. Fraser vocally opposed minority white rule in Apartheid South Africa and Rhodesia. At the Commonwealth Heads of Government Meeting (CHOGM) in 1977 in Scotland, Fraser urged for widespread condemnation of the apartheid system in South Africa and called for support for African countries. The meeting concluded The Gleneagles Agreement against apartheid in sport, which isolated South Africa. At the 1979 CHOGM in Zambia, Fraser was influential in establishing progress towards independence for Rhodesia (Zimbabwe), which led to a Commonwealth-monitored ceasefire and election resulting in the election of Robert Mugabe and independence for the former British Colony.

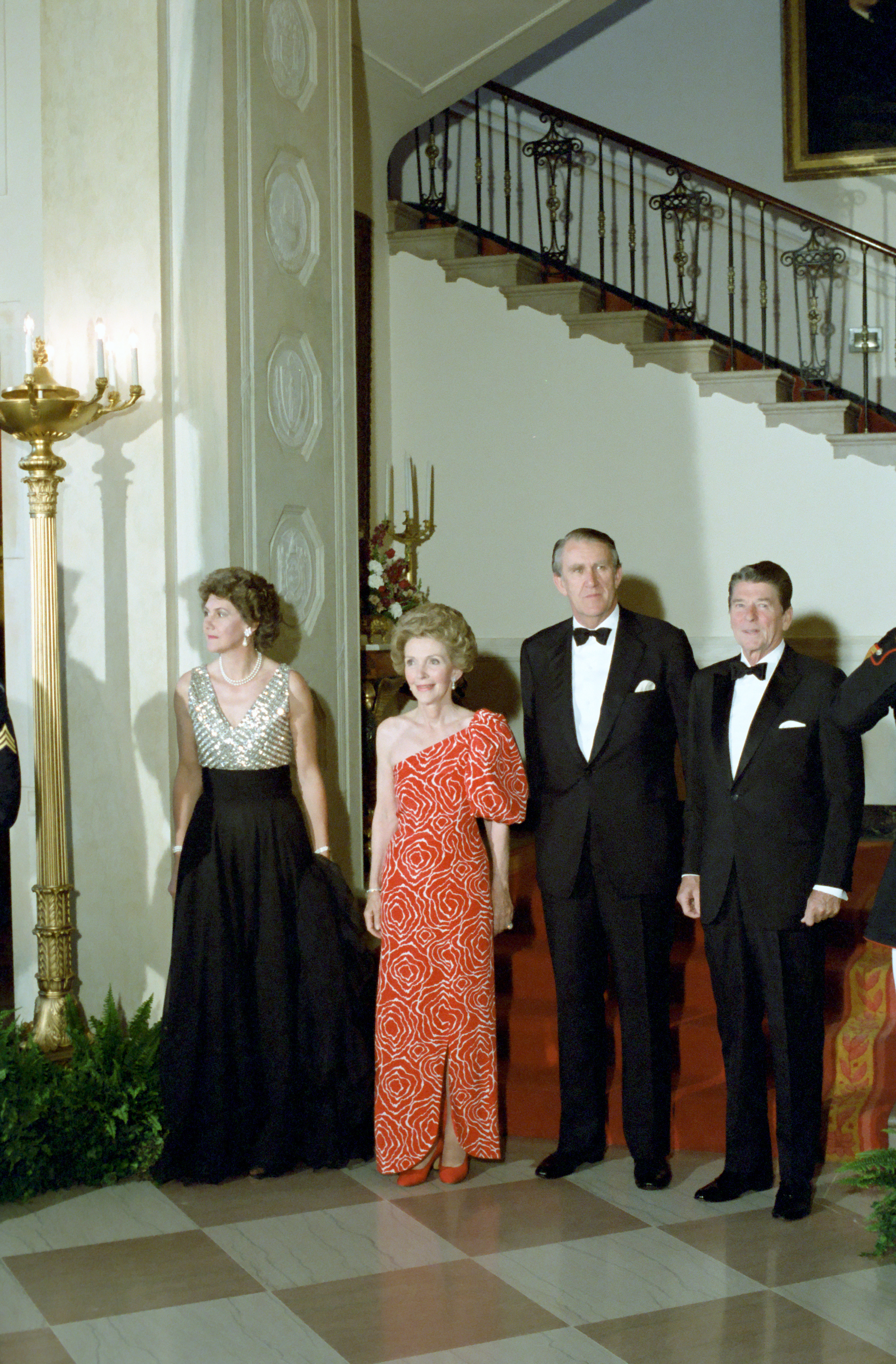
The Frasers and Reagans at the White House in 1982.

In the Asia Pacific, Fraser sought to improve trade relations and oppose Communism. As a one time Army Minister and later Minister for Defence during the Vietnam War, Fraser was firmly anti-Communist. As Prime Minister he opposed Soviet expansionism but courted good relations with the People's Republic of China, which was then emerging from the era of chairman Mao Zedong. In the name of "stability", the Fraser government recognised Indonesia's take over of East Timor, achieved via a military invasion during the later period of the Whitlam government. However, owing to Cold War sentiment, the Fraser government opposed Vietnam's invasion of Cambodia.

The Fraser government criticised the protectionist policies of the European Economic Community and sought closer trade and military co-operation with the United States. To some observers, Fraser was seen to be preoccupied with international affairs by the end of his period in office.

The United States was privately critical of the Fraser government because of its 'counterproductive "union-bashing"', although the campaign it waged with employers and the media to cast the unions as 'greedy' and 'irresponsible' was nonetheless admired.

== Final years ==
At the 1980 election, Fraser's majority was halved. With support for Fraser diminishing, Andrew Peacock challenged for party leadership. The challenge was unsuccessful and Fraser was to lead the party to the 1983 election.

Fraser had promoted "states' rights" and his government refused to use Commonwealth powers to stop the construction of the Franklin Dam in Tasmania in 1982.

Fraser sought a double dissolution of parliament and called the federal election for 5 March 1983, expecting to face Labor leader Bill Hayden. The Labor party moved to replace Hayden with Bob Hawke however, who went on to lead Labor to victory at the 1983 election.

== See also ==
- First Fraser ministry
- Second Fraser ministry
- Third Fraser ministry
- Fourth Fraser ministry
