= Margaret Guilfoyle =

Australian politician (1926–2020)

The Honourable Dame Margaret Guilfoyle AC DBE
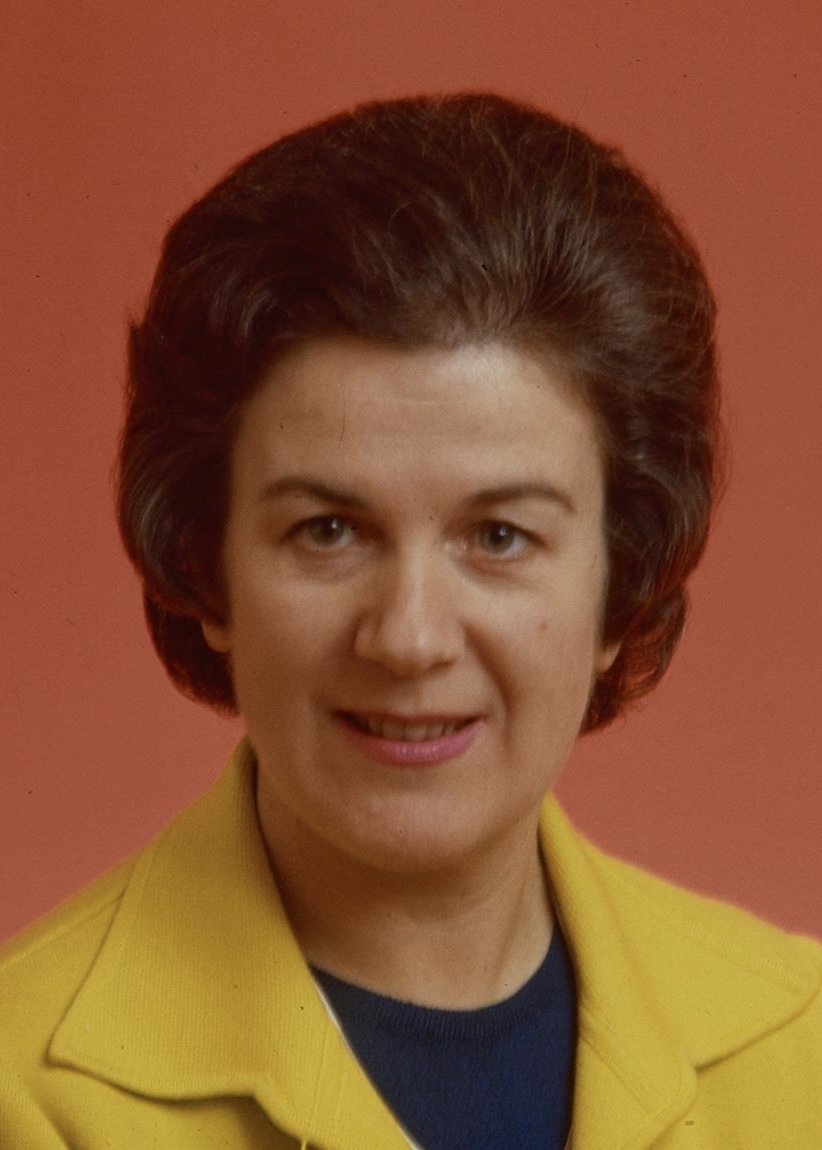
- Guilfoyle in 1974

Minister for Finance
- In office 3 November 1980 – 11 March 1983
- Prime Minister: Malcolm Fraser
- Preceded by: Eric Robinson
- Succeeded by: John Dawkins

Minister for Social Security
- In office 22 December 1975 – 3 November 1980
- Prime Minister: Malcolm Fraser
- Preceded by: Don Chipp
- Succeeded by: Fred Chaney

Minister for Education
- In office 11 November 1975 – 22 December 1975
- Prime Minister: Malcolm Fraser
- Preceded by: Kim Beazley (senior)
- Succeeded by: John Carrick

Senator for Victoria
- In office 1 July 1971 – 5 June 1987

Personal details
- Born: Margaret Georgina Constance McCartney; 15 May 1926 Belfast, Northern Ireland
- Died: 11 November 2020 (aged 94)
- Party: Liberal
- Spouse: Stanley Guilfoyle (m. 1952)
- Occupation: Accountant

Dame Margaret Georgina Constance Guilfoyle AC DBE (/ˈɡɪlfɔɪl/; née McCartney; 15 May 1926 – 11 November 2020) was an Australian politician who served as a senator for Victoria from 1971 to 1987, representing the Liberal Party. She was the first woman to hold a cabinet-level ministerial portfolio in Australia and served as a minister for the duration of the Fraser government. Guilfoyle was successively Minister for Education (1975), Minister for Social Security (1975–1980) and Minister for Finance (1980–1983). She worked as an accountant before entering politics and in retirement held various positions in the public and non-profit sectors.

== Early life ==
Guilfoyle was born Margaret Georgina Constance McCartney on 15 May 1926 in Belfast, Northern Ireland. She was the second of three children born to Elizabeth Jane (née Ellis) and William McCartney; her father worked as a civil servant and her mother was a schoolteacher before her marriage. The family immigrated to Australia in 1928, settling in Melbourne. Her father died when she was 10, after which she and her siblings were raised by their mother; they had no other relatives in Australia. Guilfoyle later recalled that her mother's experiences led her to realise "that, at any time, a woman must be capable of independence".

Guilfoyle began her education at the local state school in Fairfield, then attended a business college until the age of 15. She later took night classes while working as a secretary, studying accountancy at Taylors Institute of Advanced Studies and the Royal Melbourne Institute of Technology. She eventually qualified as an accountant and chartered secretary and in 1947 became the head accountant at Overseas Corporation Australia Ltd, an export firm. She later went into private practice in order to spend more time with her family.

== Politics ==
Guilfoyle joined the Liberal Party in the early 1950s. She was mentored by Elizabeth Couchman and Senator Ivy Wedgwood, who encouraged her to seek leadership positions within the party's organisational wing. In 1967, with their support, Guilfoyle was chosen as chairman of the state women's section and elected to the state executive. She also served as a delegate to the federal council. When Wedgwood announced her retirement, she endorsed Guilfoyle as her successor. Guilfoyle won Liberal preselection for the Senate against 20 male candidates, and was elected from second place on the Coalition's ticket in Victoria at the 1970 half-Senate election.

=== Senate ===
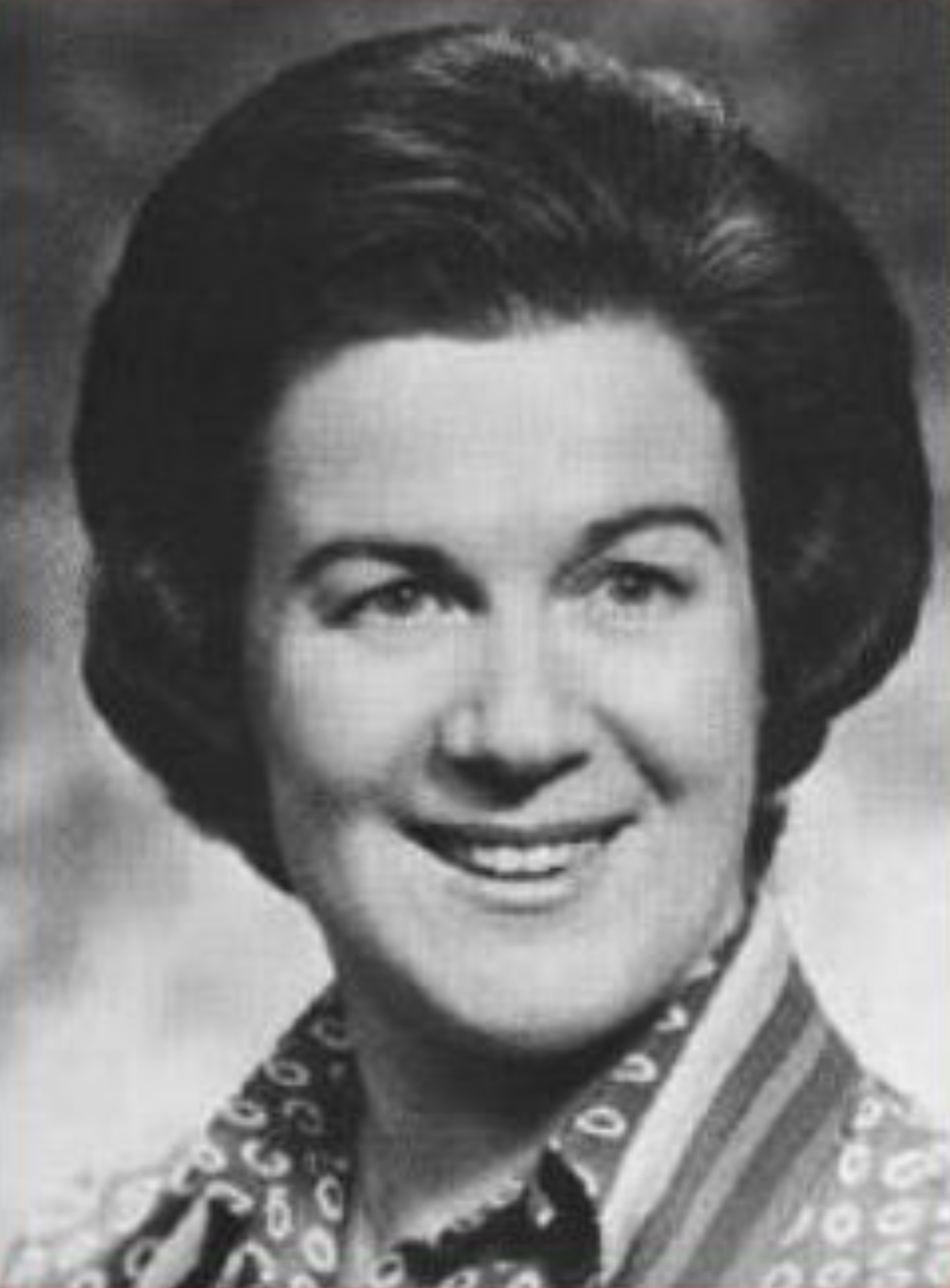
Guilfoyle in 1971

Guilfoyle's first term in the Senate began on 1 July 1971. She was re-elected in 1974, 1975, 1980 and 1983, retiring on 5 June 1987. When she began her political career, she and Senator Nancy Buttfield were the only women in parliament. There were no female members in the House of Representatives. Guilfoyle was Australia's seventh female senator and the third from Victoria, after Wedgwood and Marie Breen. Over the course of her career, an additional 19 women were elected to the Senate.

Soon after taking her seat, Guilfoyle joined the Joint Committee of Public Accounts and the Senate Standing Committee on Finance and Government Operations. As part of the latter, in December 1973 she joined Ellis Lawrie and Bob Cotton in submitting a minority report that advocated the abolition of inheritance tax; their recommendations were eventually adopted almost a decade later. Guilfoyle was appointed to the Senate Select Committee on Foreign Ownership and Control of Australian Resources in 1972, and the following year joined the Joint Committee on Prices. The Herald described her as "a housewife with a big say on prices", while The Sunday Telegraph reported that she would be "looked upon by Australian housewives as their special friend in Canberra". She in fact took pains to avoid being pigeonholed as a spokesperson for women. According to her biographer, Margaret Fitzherbert, her choices of committee "reflected her professional interests and experience, and, in sidestepping committees that were overtly concerned with family issues, marked her apart from the women who had preceded her in parliament".

=== Government minister ===
In June 1974, Guilfoyle was appointed to Billy Snedden's shadow ministry as the Coalition spokesperson for the media. She supported Malcolm Fraser in the March 1975 leadership spill, and when he was successful, she was moved to the higher-profile education portfolio. Following the dismissal of the Whitlam government in November 1975, Guilfoyle was appointed Minister for Education in Fraser's caretaker ministry. That made her the first woman to hold a cabinet-level ministerial portfolio; she was the second woman appointed to cabinet, after Enid Lyons, and the second to be given a ministerial portfolio, after Annabelle Rankin. (Note: Lyons was appointed Vice-President of the Executive Council in 1949, a largely honorary cabinet-level position with no administrative responsibilities. Rankin was appointed Minister for Housing in 1966, a junior position outside of cabinet.) In December 1975, following the Coalition's victory at the 1975 election, Guilfoyle was appointed Minister for Social Security in the second Fraser Ministry. Her new portfolio was initially placed outside of cabinet, but she was reinstated in July 1976 after Ivor Greenwood's retirement. According to Fraser, she "contributed significantly to cabinet debates ... she could be totally relied on and she could think for herself – she wasn't a captive to the bureaucracy".

In the social security portfolio, Guilfoyle was seen as skilful in balancing political and financial considerations. She strongly resisted pressure to cut her department's budget, arguing that regular increases were needed simply to maintain existing programs. She believed any cuts would be unpopular with both the general public and her party's backbenchers, and there was no guarantee that they would pass the Senate. Fraser agreed with her rationale, and in 1979 she secured a "sizeable increase" in her department's budget. She had an often tense relationship with Treasurer Phillip Lynch, who complained to Fraser that she was the most uncooperative minister in identifying potential spending cuts. During her tenure, Guilfoyle oversaw a major reform of the national child endowment scheme, introducing direct cash payments rather than tax rebates. She helped establish it as a permanent measure, renaming it the "family allowance", and resisted calls to introduce means-testing. As well as running her own department, Guilfoyle was also placed in charge of the new Office of Child Care within the Department of the Prime Minister and Cabinet. (Note: Guilfoyle held the title "Minister assisting the Prime Minister for Child Care Matters" until 1976, when it was absorbed into her social security portfolio.) Working with Marie Coleman as the office's director, she oversaw a major expansion of the federal government's activities in the childcare sector, introducing or expanding funding for preschool, daycare, after-school care, and youth refuges.

After the 1980 election, Guilfoyle was appointed Minister for Finance, effectively becoming the deputy to the treasurer, John Howard. She viewed her position as that of "chief accountant for the country". Beginning with the 1981–82 budget, government ministers were required to take budget submissions to Guilfoyle for approval. That role had previously been filled by the Expenditure Review Committee (ERC), a panel of five ministers. Under the new arrangement, the ERC only reviewed submissions if a minister had failed to come to an agreement with Guilfoyle. She was a key member of the Review of Commonwealth Functions Committee, a cabinet subcommittee nicknamed the "razor gang" that was tasked with cutting government expenditure. Its report, handed down in April 1981, recommended that hundreds of functions and programs be abolished, reduced, or transferred to state governments. Guilfoyle remained finance minister until the government's defeat at the 1983 election. She was made spokesperson for finance and taxation in Andrew Peacock's shadow ministry, but resigned the position after the 1984 election, and spent her remaining years in the Senate as a backbencher.

== Later life ==
After leaving the Senate, Guilfoyle obtained a Bachelor of Laws degree from the Australian National University (ANU). In 1990, she was nominated by the Hawke government as a member of the National Inquiry Into the Human Rights of People with Mental Illness, which issued its report in 1993. She later served as chair of the Judicial Remuneration Tribunal from 1995 to 2001. As well as her public-sector appointments, Guilfoyle also served on the boards of a number of non-profit organisations, including the Australian Children's Television Foundation, the Victorian State Opera, the Mental Health Research Institute and the Infertility Treatment Authority. She was president of the board of management of the Royal Melbourne Hospital from 1993 to 1995. In 2001, she and Joan Kirner led a campaign to secure more nominations for women in the Australian honours system. On 13 June 2005, Guilfyle was appointed Companion of the Order of Australia (AC)[26]

Guilfoyle remained involved with the Liberal Party after leaving parliament. In 1993, she was briefly a candidate for federal president, the titular head of the party's organisational wing. She had the support of Jeff Kennett and Andrew Peacock, but withdrew from the race in favour of Malcolm Fraser; the successful candidate was Tony Staley, another of her cabinet colleagues. Later that year, she was appointed chair of the Liberal Women's Candidates Forum, which was set up by John Hewson to encourage women to run for office as Liberal candidates.

== Personal life ==
Guilfoyle's husband was Stanley Guilfoyle, whom she married on 20 November 1952. The couple had two daughters and a son. Her husband worked as an accountant and company director, as well as being involved with the organisational wing of the Victorian Liberals. He was a director of 3XY, a radio station linked to the party, and was a founding director of the Cormack Foundation.

In 1976, Mungo MacCallum published an article in the Nation Review magazine alleging that Guilfoyle was having an extramarital affair with Jim Killen, one of her cabinet colleagues. Oblique references to the rumours had also been made in other publications. She and Killen sued for defamation, and obtained an injunction against further publication.

Guilfoyle died on 11 November 2020, aged 94.

== Honours ==
- Dame Commander of the Order of the British Empire (DBE), 31 December 1979
- Centenary Medal, 1 January 2001
- Companion of the Order of Australia (AC), 13 June 2005
- Victorian Honour Roll of Women, 2001

== See also ==
- List of the first women holders of political offices in Oceania

== Notes ==
Political offices
| Preceded by Kim Beazley (senior) | Minister for Education; 1975 | Succeeded by John Carrick |
| Preceded by Don Chipp | Minister for Social Security; 1975–1980 | Succeeded by Fred Chaney |
| Preceded by Eric Robinson | Minister for Finance; 1980–1983 | Succeeded by John Dawkins |
