= Second Fraser ministry =

51st ministry of government of Australia

- 51st Ministry of Australia

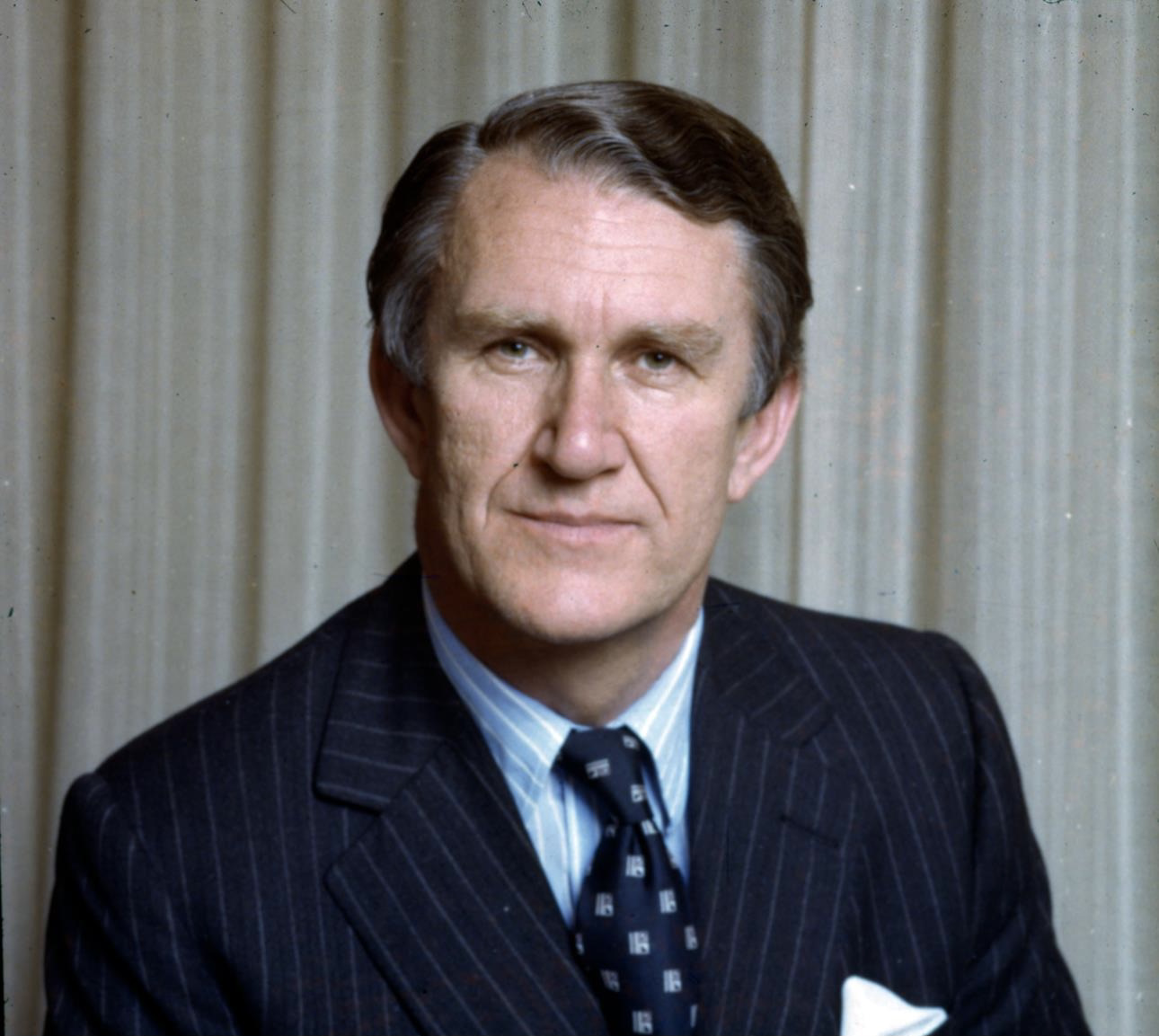
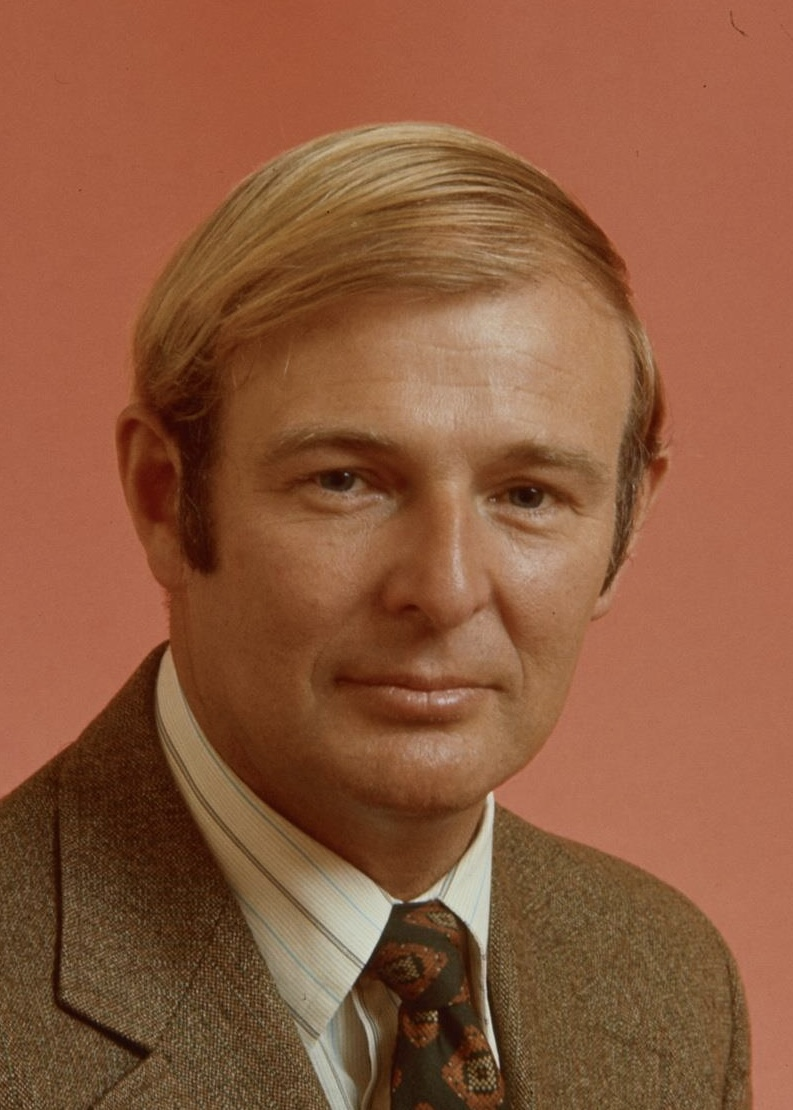
- Malcolm Fraser Doug Anthony
- Date formed: 22 December 1975
- Date dissolved: 20 December 1977

People and organisations
- Monarch: Elizabeth II
- Governor-General: Sir John Kerr; Sir Zelman Cowen
- Prime Minister: Malcolm Fraser
- Deputy Prime Minister: Doug Anthony
- No. of ministers: 28
- Member party: Liberal–National Country coalition
- Status in legislature: Majority government
- Opposition party: Labor
- Opposition leader: Gough Whitlam

History
- Election: 13 December 1975
- Outgoing election: 10 December 1977
- Legislature term: 30th
- Predecessor: First Fraser ministry
- Successor: Third Fraser ministry

The second Fraser ministry (Liberal–National Country coalition) was the 51st ministry of the Government of Australia. It was led by the country's 22nd Prime Minister, Malcolm Fraser. The second Fraser ministry succeeded the first Fraser ministry, which dissolved on 22 December 1975 following the federal election that took place on 13 December. The ministry was replaced by the third Fraser ministry on 20 December 1977 following the 1977 federal election.

As of 1 May 2025, Ian Sinclair is the last surviving member of the Cabinet of the second Fraser ministry. Tony Street was the last surviving Liberal cabinet member.

== Cabinet ==
Party	Minister	Portrait	Portfolio
Liberal	Malcolm Fraser (1930–2015) MP for Wannon (1955–1983)		Prime Minister; Leader of the Liberal Party
National Country	Doug Anthony (1929–2020) MP for Richmond (1957–1984)		Deputy Prime Minister; Leader of the National Country Party; Minister for National Resources; Minister for Overseas Trade
Liberal	Phillip Lynch (1933–1984) MP for Flinders (1966–1982)		Deputy Leader of the Liberal Party; Treasurer (to 19 November 1977); Minister for Finance (from 7 December 1976 to 19 November 1977)
National Country	Ian Sinclair (born 1929) MP for New England (1963–1998)		Deputy Leader of the National Country Party; Minister for Primary Industry; Leader of the House
Liberal	Reg Withers (1924–2014) Senator for Western Australia (1968–1987)		Leader of the Government in the Senate; Minister for Administrative Services; Vice-President of the Executive Council
Liberal	Ivor Greenwood (1926–1976) Senator for Victoria (1968–1976)		Minister for Environment, Housing and Community Development (to 8 July 1976)
Liberal	Bob Cotton (1915–2006) Senator for New South Wales (1965–1978)		Minister for Industry and Commerce
Liberal	Tony Street (1926–2022) MP for Corangamite (1966–1984)		Minister for Employment and Industrial Relations; Minister assisting the Prime Minister in Public Service Matters; Minister assisting the Prime Minister in Women's Affairs (from 16 August 1976 to 8 November 1976)
National Country	Peter Nixon (1928–2025) MP for Gippsland (1961–1983)		Minister for Transport
Liberal	John Carrick (1918–2018) Senator for New South Wales (1971–1987)		Minister for Education; Minister assisting the Prime Minister in Federal Affairs
Liberal	Andrew Peacock (1939–2021) MP for Kooyong (1966–1994)		Minister for Foreign Affairs
Liberal	James Killen (1925–2007) MP for Moreton (1955–1983)		Minister for Defence
Liberal	Margaret Guilfoyle (1926–2020) Senator for Victoria (1971–1987) (in Cabinet from 8 July 1976)		Minister for Social Security; Minister assisting the Prime Minister in Child Care Matters (to 23 July 1976)

== Outer ministry ==
Party	Minister	Portrait	Portfolio
Liberal	Bob Ellicott (1927–2022) MP for Wentworth (1974–1981)		Attorney-General (to 6 September 1977)
Liberal	John Howard (born 1939) MP for Bennelong (1974–2007)		Minister for Business and Consumer Affairs (to 17 July 1977); Minister assisting the Prime Minister (from 24 May 1977); Minister for Special Trade Negotiations (from 17 July 1977); Treasurer (from 19 November 1977)
Liberal	Vic Garland (1934–2022) MP for Curtin (1969–1981)		Minister for Post and Telecommunications (to 6 February 1976); Minister assisting the Treasurer (to 6 February 1976); Minister for Veterans' Affairs (from 6 September 1977)
National Country	Ralph Hunt (1928–2011) MP for Gwydir (1969–1989)		Minister for Health
Liberal	Michael MacKellar (1938–2015) MP for Warringah (1969–1994)		Minister for Immigration and Ethnic Affairs
Liberal	Ian Viner (born 1933) MP for Stirling (1972–1983)		Minister for Aboriginal Affairs; Minister assisting the Treasurer (from 7 December 1976)
National Country	Evan Adermann (1927–2001) MP for Fisher (1972–1984)		Minister for the Northern Territory; Minister assisting the Minister for National Resources
Liberal	Eric Robinson (1929–1981) MP for McPherson (1972–1981)		Minister for the Capital Territory (to 16 February 1976); Minister for Post and Telecommunications (from 6 February 1976); Minister assisting the Treasurer (from 6 February 1976)
Liberal	John McLeay (1922–2000) MP for Boothby (1966–1981)		Minister for Construction; Minister assisting the Minister for Defence
Liberal	Kevin Newman (1933–1999) MP for Bass (1975–1984)		Minister for Repatriation (to 8 July 1976); Minister for Environment, Housing and Community Development (from 8 July 1976)
National Country	James Webster (1925–2022) Senator for Victoria (1964–1980)		Minister for Science
Liberal	Tony Staley (1939–2023) MP for Chisholm (1970–1980) (in Ministry from 16 February 1976)		Minister for the Capital Territory (from 16 February 1976); Minister assisting the Prime Minister in matters concerning the Arts (from 16 August 1976)
Liberal	Peter Durack (1926–2008) Senator for Western Australia (1971–1993) (in Ministry from 8 July 1976)		Minister for Repatriation (from 8 July 1976 to 5 October 1976); Minister for Veterans' Affairs (from 5 October 1976 to 6 September 1977); Attorney-General (from 6 September 1977)
Liberal	Ian Macphee (born 1938) MP for Balaclava (1974–1984) (in Ministry from 8 November 1976)		Minister for Productivity (from 8 November 1976); Minister assisting the Prime Minister in Women's Affairs (from 8 November 1976); Minister assisting the Minister for Employment and Industrial Relations (from 8 November 1976)
Liberal	Wal Fife (1929–2017) MP for Farrer (1975–1984) (in Ministry from 17 July 1977)		Minister for Business and Consumer Affairs (from 17 July 1977)

== See also ==
- First Fraser ministry
- Third Fraser ministry
- Fourth Fraser ministry
