= Ivor Greenwood =

Australian politician (1926–1976)

The Honourable Ivor Greenwood QC
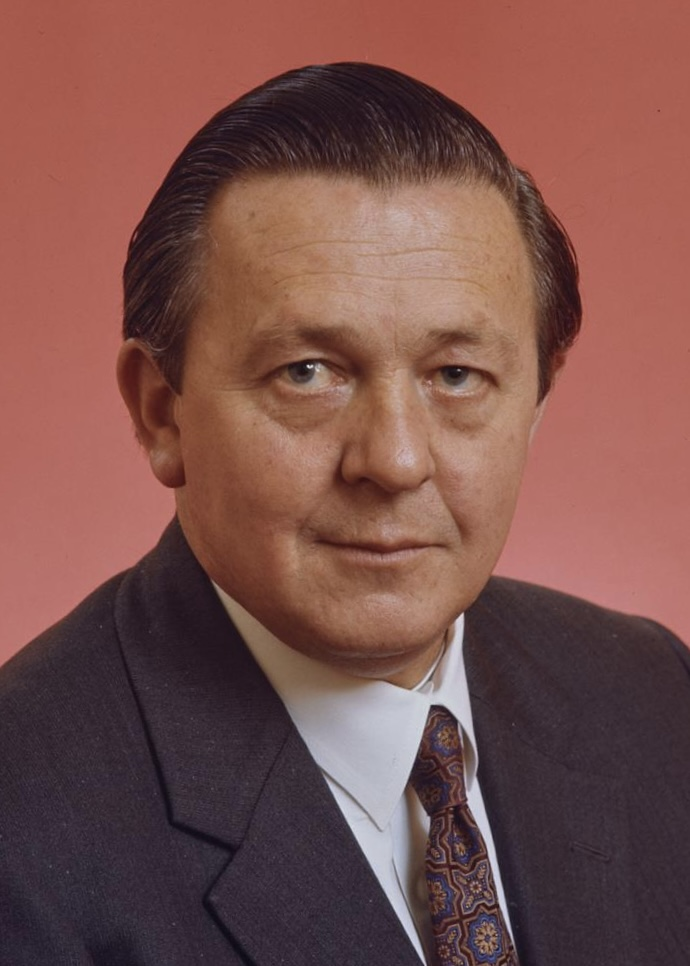
- Official portrait, 1974

Minister for the Environment, Housing and Community Development
- In office 22 December 1975 – 8 July 1976
- Prime Minister: Malcolm Fraser
- Preceded by: John Carrick
- Succeeded by: Kevin Newman

Attorney-General for Australia
- In office 11 November 1975 – 22 December 1975
- Prime Minister: Malcolm Fraser
- Preceded by: Kep Enderby
- Succeeded by: Bob Ellicott
- In office 2 August 1971 – 5 December 1972
- Prime Minister: William McMahon
- Preceded by: Nigel Bowen
- Succeeded by: Gough Whitlam

Minister for Health
- In office 22 March 1971 – 2 August 1971
- Prime Minister: William McMahon
- Preceded by: Jim Forbes
- Succeeded by: Ken Anderson

Senator for Victoria
- In office 21 February 1968 – 13 October 1976
- Preceded by: John Gorton
- Succeeded by: Austin Lewis

Personal details
- Born: Ivor John Greenwood; 15 November 1926 North Melbourne, Victoria, Australia
- Died: 13 October 1976 (aged 49) Parkville, Victoria, Australia
- Party: Liberal
- Spouse: Lola Roney (m. 1960)
- Education: University of Melbourne
- Occupation: Barrister

Ivor John Greenwood QC (15 November 1926 – 13 October 1976) was an Australian barrister and politician. He was a member of the Liberal Party and held senior ministerial office in the McMahon and Fraser governments. He served as Minister for Health (1971), Attorney-General (1971–1972, 1975) and Minister for the Environment, Housing and Community Development (1975–1976). He was a Senator for Victoria from 1968 until his death in 1976, aged 49.

== Early life ==
Greenwood was born on 15 November 1926 in North Melbourne, Victoria. He was the oldest of three children born to Joy Olive (née Vickers) and Bartlett John Greenwood. His father was a boilermaker with the Victorian Railways. Greenwood attended Hartwell State School and Mont Albert Central State School before winning a scholarship to Scotch College. In 1945 he matriculated to the University of Melbourne, graduating Bachelor of Laws in 1949. He served as president of the Melbourne University Liberal Club and the Students' Representative Council. He subsequently worked as an associate to two High Court judges, Frank Kitto and Owen Dixon.

== Legal career ==
Greenwood was called to the Victorian Bar in 1951 and shared chambers with future High Court justice and governor-general Ninian Stephen for a period. He "soon established a reputation as a scholarly but practical barrister, working principally in the fields of commercial and local government law". Greenwood served as honorary secretary of the Law Council of Australia from 1963 to 1968. He was also involved with the Law Association for Asia and the Western Pacific (later known as LAWASIA). He was appointed Queen's Counsel in 1969, but according to the Australian Dictionary of Biography did not "achieve the material success that would have been his had he confined himself to the usual activities of a barrister".

== Political career ==
=== Early involvement ===
Greenwood joined the Young Liberal and Country Movement at a young age. He and his close friend Alan Missen were known as civil libertarians and opposed the Menzies Government's attempts to ban the Communist Party in 1951. The following year, Greenwood was elected to the executive of the Liberal and Country Party and chosen as state president of the Young Liberal Movement, serving until 1954. He remained on the state executive of the Liberal Party until 1968, including as vice-president from 1966.

=== Senate ===
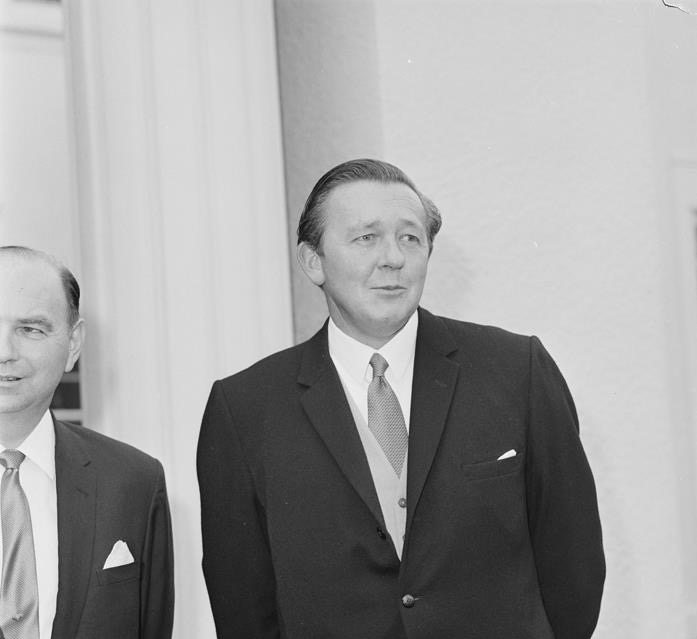
Greenwood with Malcolm Mackay on 22 March 1971

Greenwood was nominated to fill a casual vacancy in the Australian Senate, created by John Gorton's move to the House of Representatives in 1968. He was appointed Minister for Health from March to August 1971 in the McMahon ministry and then Attorney-General until the defeat of the government in December 1972 election.

Following the 1975 election, he was appointed Deputy Leader of the Government in the Senate, and became Minister for Environment, Housing and Community Development in the Fraser ministry. On 7 May 1976, Greenwood collapsed at Parliament House after suffering "a massive heart attack and stroke"; he lapsed into a coma. He remained gravely ill and in July his ministerial commission was withdrawn. In October 1976 he died of an acute heart attack with anoxic cerebral complications, survived by his wife, son and daughter.

== Notes ==
Political offices
Preceded by Jim Forbes	Minister for Health; 1971	Succeeded by Ken Anderson
Preceded by Nigel Bowen	Attorney-General; 1971–72	Succeeded by Gough Whitlam
Preceded by Kep Enderby	Attorney-General; 1975	Succeeded by Robert Ellicott
Preceded by Jim Cavanagh	Minister for Police and Customs; 1975	Succeeded by John Howard (customs)
Preceded by Andrew Peacock (environment); John Carrick (housing)	Minister for Environment, Housing and Community Development; 1975–76	Succeeded by Kevin Newman
