= Sankey v Whitlam =

Court case decided in the High Court of Australia in 1978

- Court: High Court of Australia
- Full case name: Sankey v Whitlam & Ors
- Decided: 9 November 1978
- Citations: (1978) 142 CLR 1, [1978 HCA 43]

Case history
- Prior action: Sankey v Whitlam (1977) 1 NSWLR 333
- Subsequent action: none

Court membership
- Judges sitting: Gibbs ACJ, Stephen, Mason, Jacobs & Aickin JJ

Case opinions
- (4:1) the documents were not subject to privilege and should be produced (per Gibbs ACJ, Stephen, Mason & Aickin JJ) (4:0) it is the responsibility of the courts to decide whether or not it is in the public interest to protect documents from disclosure (per Gibbs ACJ, Stephen, Mason & Aickin JJ) (5:0) the allegations of an offence under the Crimes Act 1914 were bad in law (per curiam)

Sankey v Whitlam was an important court case decided in the High Court of Australia on 9 November 1978.

On 20 November 1975, during the election campaign which followed the dismissal of the Whitlam government, a Sydney solicitor, Danny Sankey, initiated a private prosecution against Gough Whitlam, Rex Connor, Lionel Murphy and Jim Cairns as a private citizen. The prosecution related to the alleged unlawful conduct of the accused in relation to their participation in the so-called 'loans affair'.

Two charges were laid against each defendant. The first alleged that the loan proposal would have contravened the Commonwealth-State Financial Agreement of 1928. The second alleged that the defendants had conspired to deceive the Governor-General in the performance of his duties.

The prosecution went through numerous preliminary steps in the Queanbeyan Magistrates' Court before Stipendiary Magistrate Darcy Leo, including appeals to the NSW Court of Appeal, before it reached a stage which brought it before the High Court.

On 9 November 1976, Sankey subpoenaed Executive Council and Loan Council documents for production before the Magistrate. The Fraser government objected to produce these documents, arguing that they were confidential and were subject to 'crown privilege'. This claim was upheld by the Magistrate. The matter went on appeal to the NSW Court of Appeal. The appeals were removed to the High Court.

At all relevant times during the prosecution one of the defendants, Lionel Murphy, was a Justice of the High Court. Justice Murphy did not sit as part of the Court to hear the appeal from the Magistrate's ruling.

The High Court overruled the magistrate and held that the documents should be produced before the Magistrate. However, the Court also ruled that the charge alleging contravention of the Financial Agreement was bad in law, and dismissed that charge.

The lasting significance of the Court's ruling was that it imposed a very narrow view of when a government could claim 'crown privilege', finding that even cabinet documents were not exempt from production before the courts.
