= Vice-President of the Executive Council =

Australian cabinet position

- Commonwealth Coat of Arms

- Flag of Australia

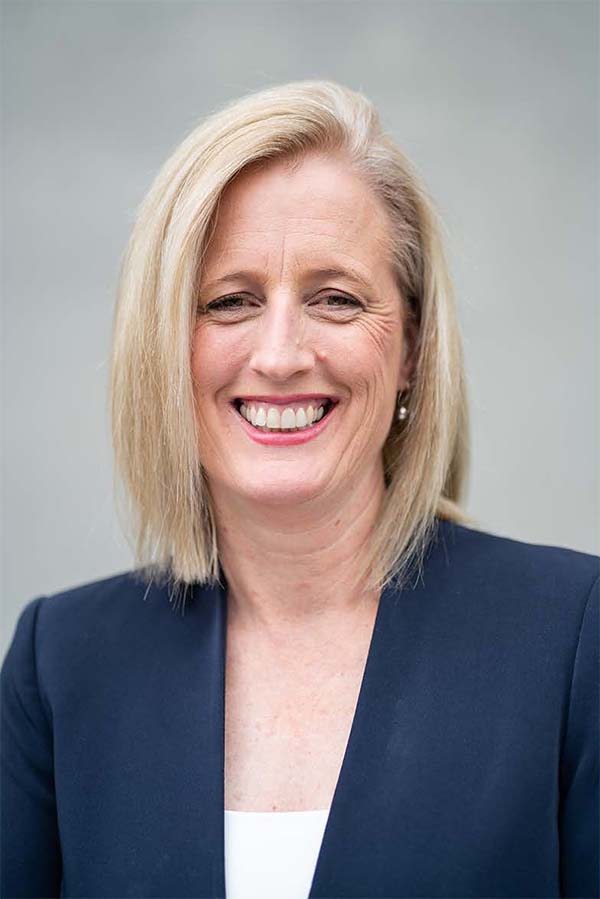
- Incumbent; Katy Gallagher since 23 May 2022
- Australian Government; Federal Executive Council
- Style: The Honourable
- Appointer: Governor-General on the advice of the prime minister
- Inaugural holder: Richard O'Connor
- Formation: 1 January 1901

The Vice-President of the Executive Council is the minister in the Government of Australia who acts as the presiding officer of meetings of the Federal Executive Council when the Governor-General is absent. The Vice-President of the Executive Council is appointed by the Governor-General on the advice of the Prime Minister of Australia, and serves at the Governor-General's pleasure. The Vice-President is usually a senior minister in Cabinet, who may summon executive councillors and preside at council meetings when the Governor-General is not present. However, the Vice-President cannot sign Executive Council documents on behalf of the Governor-General.

The current Vice President of the Executive Council is Senator Katy Gallagher, who was appointed on 23 May 2022.

== Duties and history ==
The duties of the vice-president of the executive council are not rigorous, and the position is usually held by a member of the Cabinet, who is not paid additional salary or allowance.

The position is usually not held by a 'minister without portfolio', but the position has at times been held by persons who did not hold a ministerial portfolio—such as Enid Lyons (1949–1951) in the Fourth Menzies Ministry and James Killen (1982–1983) in the Third Fraser Ministry. A small department of the vice-president of the executive council existed from 22 March to 31 May 1971, during the prime ministership of William McMahon. It was administered by Alan Hulme, who was also postmaster-general. The department was recreated in 1982 and James Killen was controversially appointed to administer the office. Killen held no other ministerial portfolio, but was nevertheless considered a member of the Fraser Ministry by virtue only of this office. The appointment was controversial because it was seen as a sinecure given that Killen held no ministerial portfolio, as the cabinet appointment entitled him to receive a ministerial salary. The department was again abolished in 1983 by incoming prime minister Bob Hawke.

During the Turnbull government in 2015, the Leader of the Government in the Senate has been the vice-president. This practice was continued by the Morrison government. Under the Albanese Government, the roles are separated though the vice-president remains a senator.

=== Colonial and state governments ===
Prior to the creation of the Commonwealth of Australia in 1901, colonial and state governments also appointed a Vice-President of the Executive Council, and some have kept the title. The Colony of New South Wales was the first to appoint a Vice-President of the Executive Council (New South Wales), on 3 October 1856, in the Parker ministry of the first elected colonial government. The New South Wales government currently retains the title for a senior government minister, who since 30 October 2020 has been Damien Tudehope, Leader of the Government in the Legislative Council.

The Executive Council of Victoria is made up of the Premier and their Ministers who have been sworn into that office by the Governor, usually immediately after they have been sworn in as Ministers. While not a member, the Governor usually attends and presides at meetings of the Executive Council.

== List of vice-presidents ==
The following individuals have been appointed as Vice-President of the Executive Council:

Order	Minister	Party	Prime Minister	Substantive portfolios	Term start	Term end	Term in office
1	Senator Richard O'Connor	Protectionist	Barton	–	1 January 1901	24 September 1903	2 years, 266 days
2	Senator Thomas Playford	Protectionist	Deakin	–	24 September 1903	27 April 1904	216 days
3	Senator Gregor McGregor	Labor	Watson	–	27 April 1904	17 August 1904	112 days
4	Senator James Drake	Protectionist	Reid	–	17 August 1904	5 July 1905	322 days
5	Thomas Ewing	Protectionist	Deakin	–	5 July 1905	12 October 1906	1 year, 99 days
6	Senator John Keating	Protectionist	Deakin	Home Affairs	12 October 1906	30 July 1907	291 days
7	Senator Robert Best	Protectionist	Deakin	–	30 July 1907	13 November 1908	1 year, 106 days
n/a	Senator Gregor McGregor	Labor	Fisher	–	13 November 1908	2 June 1909	201 days
8	Senator Edward Millen	Commonwealth Liberal	Deakin	–	2 June 1909	29 April 1910	331 days
n/a	Senator Gregor McGregor	Labor	Fisher	–	29 April 1910	24 June 1913	3 years, 56 days
9	Senator James McColl	Commonwealth Liberal	Cook	–	24 June 1913	17 September 1914	1 year, 85 days
10	Senator Albert Gardiner	Labor	Fisher	–	17 September 1914	27 October 1915	2 years, 40 days
10	Senator Albert Gardiner	Labor	Hughes	–	27 October 1915	27 October 1916	2 years, 40 days
11	William Spence	National Labor	Hughes	–	14 November 1916	17 February 1917	95 days
n/a	Senator Edward Millen	Nationalist	Hughes	Repatriation	17 February 1917	10 January 1918	327 days
12	Littleton Groom	Nationalist	Hughes	–	10 January 1918	27 March 1918	76 days
13	Senator Edward Russell	Nationalist	Hughes	–	27 March 1918	21 December 1921	3 years, 269 days
14	Senator John Earle	Nationalist	Hughes	–	21 December 1921	5 February 1923	1 year, 46 days
15	Llewellyn Atkinson	Country	Bruce	–	5 February 1923	18 June 1926	3 years, 133 days
16	Senator George Pearce	Nationalist	Bruce	–	18 June 1926	22 October 1929	3 years, 126 days
17	Senator John Daly	Labor	Scullin	Defence (4 February 1931–3 March 1931)	22 October 1929	3 March 1931	1 year, 132 days
18	Senator John Barnes	Labor	Scullin	–	3 March 1931	6 January 1932	309 days
19	Senator Alexander McLachlan	UAP	Lyons	Development and Scientific and Industrial Research	6 January 1932	12 October 1934	2 years, 279 days
20	Billy Hughes	UAP	Lyons	Health; Repatriation	12 October 1934	6 November 1935	1 year, 25 days
21	Joseph Lyons	UAP	Lyons	Prime Minister	6 November 1935	29 November 1937	2 years, 23 days
n/a	Billy Hughes	UAP	Lyons	External Affairs; Territories	29 November 1937	7 November 1938	343 days
22	Senator George McLeay	UAP	Lyons	–	7 November 1938	7 April 1939	170 days
22	Senator George McLeay	UAP	Page	–	7 April 1939	26 April 1939	170 days
23	James Fairbairn	UAP	Menzies	Civil Aviation (26 April 1939–26 January 1940); Air (13 November 1939–26 January 1940)	26 April 1939	26 January 1940	275 days
24	Percy Spender	UAP	Menzies	–	26 January 1940	14 March 1940	48 days
25	Henry Gullett	UAP	Menzies	Scientific and Industrial Research; War Service Homes	14 March 1940	13 August 1940	152 days
26	Senator Herbert Collett	UAP	Menzies	Scientific and Industrial Research; War Service Homes	14 August 1940	28 October 1940	75 days
27	Senator George McLeay	UAP	Menzies	Postmaster-General and Repatriation (28 October 1940–14 June 1941); Supply and Development (14 June 1941–29 August 1941)	28 October 1940	29 August 1941	344 days
27	Senator George McLeay	UAP	Fadden	Supply and Development	29 August 1941	7 October 1941	344 days
28	Senator Richard Keane	Labor	Curtin	Trade and Customs	7 October 1941	21 September 1943	1 year, 349 days
29	Senator Bill Ashley	Labor	Curtin	Postmaster-General	21 September 1943	2 February 1945	1 year, 134 days
30	Jack Beasley	Labor	Curtin	–	2 February 1945	6 July 1945	161 days
30	Jack Beasley	Labor	Forde	Defence	6 July 1945	13 July 1945	161 days
31	Senator Joe Collings	Labor	Chifley	–	13 July 1945	1 November 1946	1 year, 111 days
32	William Scully	Labor	Chifley	–	1 November 1946	19 December 1949	3 years, 48 days
33	Enid Lyons	Liberal	Menzies	–	19 December 1949	7 March 1951	1 year, 78 days
34	Robert Menzies	Liberal	Menzies	Prime Minister	7 March 1951	11 May 1951	65 days
35	Eric Harrison	Liberal	Menzies	Defence Production; Army; Navy	11 May 1951	24 October 1956	5 years, 166 days
36	Senator Neil O'Sullivan	Liberal	Menzies	Attorney-General	24 October 1956	10 December 1958	2 years, 47 days
37	Senator Bill Spooner	Liberal	Menzies	National Development	10 December 1958	10 June 1964	5 years, 183 days
38	William McMahon	Liberal	Menzies	Labour and National Service	10 June 1964	26 January 1966	1 year, 230 days
39	Alan Hulme	Liberal	Holt	Postmaster-General (Hulme was also the "Minister administering the Department of the Vice-President of the Executive Council", a department that was created and existed between 10 March 1971 and 30 May 1971.)	26 January 1966	19 December 1967	6 years, 314 days
39	Alan Hulme	Liberal	McEwen	Postmaster-General (Hulme was also the "Minister administering the Department of the Vice-President of the Executive Council", a department that was created and existed between 10 March 1971 and 30 May 1971.)	19 December 1967	10 January 1968	6 years, 314 days
39	Alan Hulme	Liberal	Gorton	Postmaster-General (Hulme was also the "Minister administering the Department of the Vice-President of the Executive Council", a department that was created and existed between 10 March 1971 and 30 May 1971.)	10 January 1968	10 March 1971	6 years, 314 days
39	Alan Hulme	Liberal	McMahon	Postmaster-General (Hulme was also the "Minister administering the Department of the Vice-President of the Executive Council", a department that was created and existed between 10 March 1971 and 30 May 1971.)	10 March 1971	5 December 1972	6 years, 314 days
40	Senator Don Willesee	Labor	Whitlam	Special Minister of State; Foreign Affairs	19 December 1972	30 November 1973	346 days
41	Frank Stewart	Labor	Whitlam	Tourism and Recreation	30 November 1973	11 November 1975	1 year, 346 days
42	Senator Reg Withers	Liberal	Fraser	Capital Territory; Media; Special Minister of State; Tourism and Recreation (11 November 1975–22 December 1975); Administrative Services (22 December 1975–7 August 1978)	11 November 1975	7 August 1978	2 years, 269 days
43	Senator John Carrick	Liberal	Fraser	Education (22 December 1975–8 December 1979); National Development and Energy (8 December 1979–11 March 1983)	7 August 1978	7 May 1982	3 years, 273 days
44	James Killen	Liberal	Fraser	(Killen had no other portfolio, but the Department of the Vice-President of the Executive Council was created for him to administer.)	7 May 1982	11 March 1983	308 days
45	Mick Young	Labor	Hawke	Special Minister of State	11 March 1983	14 July 1983	125 days
46	Lionel Bowen	Labor	Hawke	Deputy Prime Minister; Trade (11 March 1983–13 December 1984); Attorney-General (13 December 1984–4 April 1990)	14 July 1983	24 July 1987	4 years, 10 days
n/a	Mick Young	Labor	Hawke	Immigration, Local Government and Ethnic Affairs	24 July 1987	12 February 1988	203 days
47	Kim Beazley	Labor	Hawke	Defence (13 December 1984–4 April 1990); Transport and Communications (4 April 1990–9 December 1991)	12 February 1988	1 February 1991	2 years, 354 days
48	Senator Graham Richardson	Labor	Hawke	Social Security	1 February 1991	20 December 1991	1 year, 107 days
48	Senator Graham Richardson	Labor	Keating	Social Security (20 December 1991–27 December 1991); Transport and Communications (27 December 1991–18 May 1992)	20 December 1991	18 May 1992	1 year, 107 days
49	Ralph Willis	Labor	Keating	Finance	27 May 1992	24 March 1993	301 days
50	Frank Walker	Labor	Keating	Special Minister of State	24 March 1993	25 March 1994	1 year, 1 day
51	Gary Johns	Labor	Keating	Special Minister of State	25 March 1994	11 March 1996	1 year, 352 days
52	John Moore	Liberal	Howard	Industry, Science and Tourism	11 March 1996	21 October 1998	2 years, 224 days
53	David Kemp	Liberal	Howard	Education, Training and Youth Affairs; Assistant Treasurer (21 October 1998–26 November 2001); Environment and Heritage (26 November 2001–18 July 2004)	21 October 1998	18 July 2004	5 years, 271 days
54	Senator Nick Minchin	Liberal	Howard	Finance and Administration	18 July 2004	3 December 2007	3 years, 138 days
55	Senator John Faulkner	Labor	Rudd	Special Minister of State (3 December 2007–9 June 2009); Defence (9 June 2009–24 June 2010)	3 December 2007	24 June 2010	2 years, 285 days
55	Senator John Faulkner	Labor	Gillard	Defence	24 June 2010	14 September 2010	2 years, 285 days
56	Robert McClelland	Labor	Gillard	Attorney-General (3 December 2007–14 December 2011); Housing, Homelessness and Emergency Management(14 December 2011–5 March 2012)	14 September 2010	5 March 2012	1 year, 173 days
57	Tony Burke	Labor	Gillard	Sustainability, Environment, Water, Population and Communities (15 September 2010–1 July 2013)	5 March 2012	1 July 2013	1 year, 197 days
57	Tony Burke	Labor	Rudd	Minister for Immigration, Multicultural Affairs and Citizenship; Arts	1 July 2013	18 September 2013	1 year, 197 days
58	Senator George Brandis	Liberal	Abbott	Attorney-General; Minister for the Arts	18 September 2013	15 September 2015	4 years, 93 days
58	Senator George Brandis	Liberal	Turnbull	Attorney-General	15 September 2015	20 December 2017	4 years, 93 days
59	Senator Mathias Cormann	Liberal	Turnbull	Minister for Finance; Special Minister of State	20 December 2017	23 August 2018	2 years, 315 days
59	Senator Mathias Cormann	Liberal	Morrison	Minister for Finance and the Public Service (28 August 2018–29 May 2019); Minister for Finance (29 May 2019–30 October 2020)	28 August 2018	30 October 2020	2 years, 315 days
60	Senator Simon Birmingham	Liberal	Morrison	Minister for Trade, Tourism and Investment (30 October 2020–22 December 2020); Minister for Finance (30 October 2020–22 May 2022)	30 October 2020	22 May 2022	5 years, 313 days
61	Senator Katy Gallagher	Labor	Albanese	Minister for Finance; Minister for the Public Service; Minister for Women	23 May 2022	Incumbent	4 years, 108 days
