= James Killen =

Australian politician

The Honourable Sir James Killen AC, KCMG
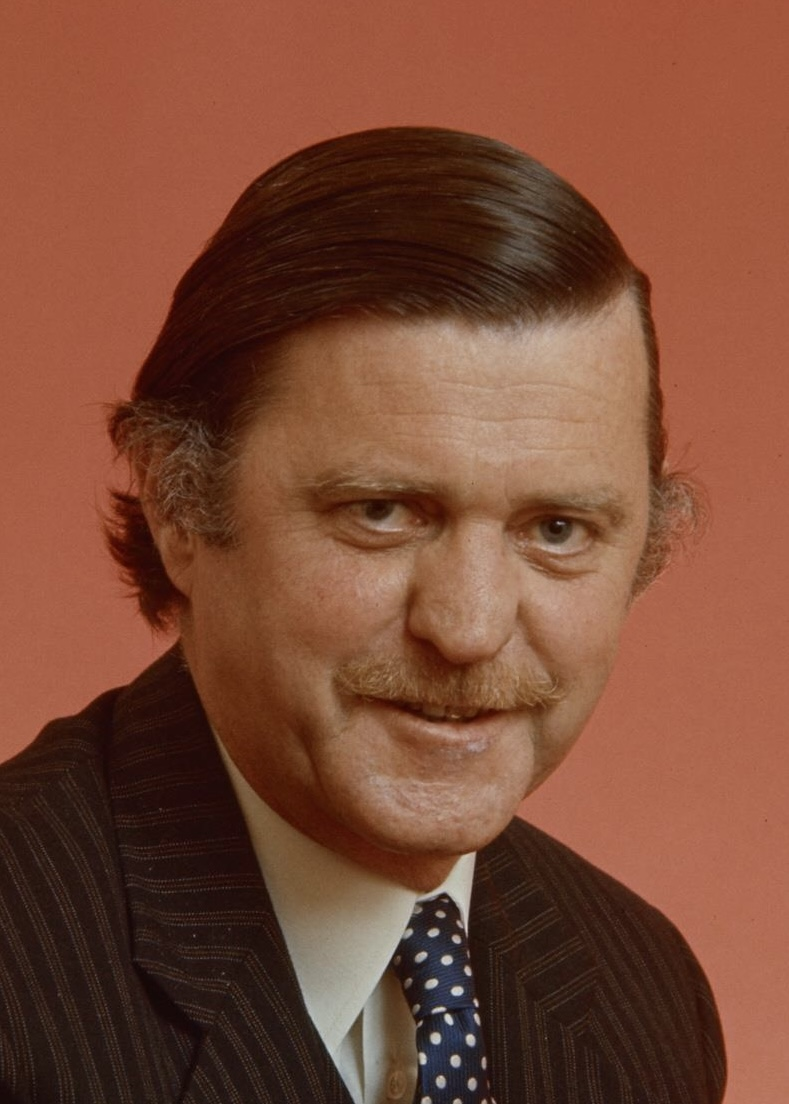
- Killen in 1974.

Father of the House
- In office 1 April 1983 – 15 August 1983
- Preceded by: Malcolm Fraser
- Succeeded by: Doug Anthony

Vice-President of the Executive Council Leader of the House
- In office 7 May 1982 – 11 March 1983
- Prime Minister: Malcolm Fraser
- Preceded by: Sir John Carrick; Ian Sinclair
- Succeeded by: Mick Young

Minister for Defence
- In office 11 November 1975 – 7 May 1982
- Prime Minister: Malcolm Fraser
- Preceded by: Bill Morrison
- Succeeded by: Ian Sinclair

Minister for the Navy
- In office 12 November 1969 – 22 March 1971
- Prime Minister: John Gorton; William McMahon
- Preceded by: Bert Kelly
- Succeeded by: Malcolm Mackay

Member of the Australian Parliament for Moreton
- In office 10 December 1955 – 15 August 1983
- Preceded by: Josiah Francis
- Succeeded by: Don Cameron

Personal details
- Born: 23 November 1925 Dalby, Queensland, Australia
- Died: 12 January 2007 (aged 81) Auchenflower, Queensland, Australia
- Party: Liberal
- Spouse(s): Joy Buley; Benise Killen
- Education: Brisbane Grammar School
- Alma mater: University of Queensland

Military service
- Allegiance: Australia
- Branch/service: Royal Australian Air Force
- Years of service: 1943–1945
- Rank: Flight sergeant

Sir Denis James "Jim" Killen, AC, KCMG (23 November 1925 – 12 January 2007) was an Australian politician and a Liberal Party member of the Australian House of Representatives for almost 30 years, 1955 to 1983, representing the Division of Moreton in Queensland. He served as Vice-President of the Executive Council, Minister for Defence and Minister for the Navy during his parliamentary career.

== Education and early career ==
Killen was born in Dalby, Queensland, son of Mabel Killen, née Sheridan, and dentist James Walker Killen, who died 16 January 1928. He was educated at Brisbane Grammar School and the University of Queensland, where he graduated in law. He enlisted for service in the Royal Australian Air Force during World War II; he was discharged in 1945 with the rank of flight sergeant. After the war he worked on the land before returning to Brisbane. In 1949 he joined the new Liberal Party of Australia and became the founding president of the Queensland Young Liberals.

== Political career ==
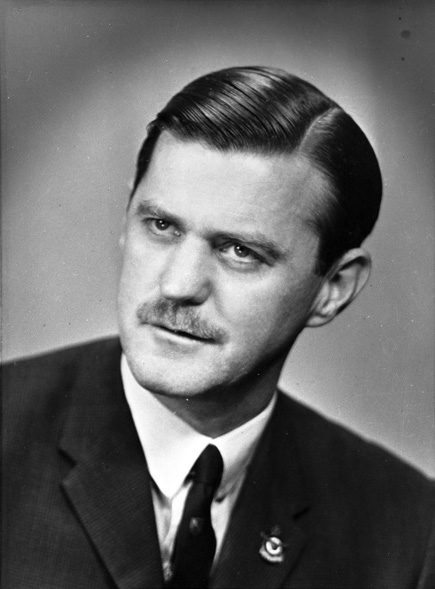
Killen in 1968.

In the 1955 election, Killen was elected to the House of Representatives for the Brisbane seat of Moreton, holding the seat until 1983. He quickly became known as a talented orator but his outspokenness and commitment to causes that Menzies regarded as contrary to Liberal Party principles limited his chances of promotion.

His critics alleged he was associated with the extremist Australian League of Rights, whose director, Eric Dudley Butler, was a notorious anti-Semite, although Killen himself was never accused of anti-Semitism. He was a supporter of Ian Smith's regime in Rhodesia and opposed sanctions against apartheid South Africa.

In the 1961 election, Killen narrowly retained his seat, and since Robert Menzies' Liberal government was re-elected with a majority of only two, and with Killen's seat the last to be declared, it was claimed by some that Killen had 'saved' Menzies and his government. Killen claimed that Menzies had phoned him, saying "Killen, you are magnificent!", and that story was widely repeated for many years, but he later confessed he had made it up for the Courier-Mail to overcome his disappointment at not, in fact, receiving such a call from Menzies.

By the late 1960s Killen had somewhat moderated his views, and in the government of John Gorton he served as Minister for the Navy from 1969 to 1971. When William McMahon became Prime Minister, Killen was dropped from the Ministry. After the Liberals lost office to Labor under Gough Whitlam, he served in the Shadow Cabinet under Billy Snedden and Malcolm Fraser from 1972 to 1975, acting as the party spokesman on Education and later Defence. He served as Minister for Defence in the Fraser Government from 1975 to 1982.

During this time he oversaw a major review of the Australian Defence Force and also the military build-up which followed the Soviet invasion of Afghanistan in 1979. He oversaw the largest single piece of Defence expenditure in Australian history, the purchase of 75 F/A-18 Hornets.

Killen was moved out of Defence in a 1982 reshuffle. He was made a Knight Commander of the Order of St Michael and St George in the 1982 Birthday Honours, becoming "Sir James Killen KCMG", and appointed Vice-President of the Executive Council, a position he held until the defeat of the Fraser government in 1983 election by Labor under Bob Hawke. He became Father of the House of Representatives in April 1983, and resigned his seat of Moreton in August 1983 (the first Queensland Member of the House of Representatives to resign), and returned to his legal practice. He was a prominent figure at the Brisbane bar through the 1980s and 1990s.

Killen was a prominent monarchist and was elected to the Constitutional Convention in 1998 as an opponent of an Australian republic. In 2004, he was made a Companion of the Order of Australia (AC).

Killen had a reputation as a great parliamentary wit who developed close friendships with many people on both sides of politics, among them Gough Whitlam, Fred Daly and Barry Cohen. He wrote the preface to Daly's collection of political anecdotes, The Politician Who Laughed (1982).

== Private life ==
Killen was married twice. His first marriage was in 1949, to Joy (née Buley), with whom he had three daughters (one of whom predeceased him). Joy Killen died in 2000, and he married his second wife, Benise (née Atherton) the following year.

In 1976, Mungo MacCallum published an article in the Nation Review magazine alleging that Killen was having an extramarital affair with Margaret Guilfoyle, one of his cabinet colleagues. Oblique references to the rumours had also been made in other publications. He and Guilfoyle sued for defamation, and obtained an injunction against further publication.

Killen died in Brisbane in 2007. Gough Whitlam delivered the eulogy at his state funeral at Brisbane's St. John's Cathedral. Killen was survived by his second wife Benise, his two surviving daughters, and two granddaughters.

Political offices
Preceded by Bert Kelly	Minister for the Navy; 1969–1971	Succeeded by Malcolm Mackay
Preceded by Bill Morrison	Minister for Defence; 1975–1982	Succeeded by Ian Sinclair
Preceded by Sir John Carrick	Vice-President of the Executive Council; 1982–1983	Succeeded by Mick Young
Parliament of Australia
Preceded by Josiah Francis	Member for Moreton; 1955–1983	Succeeded by Don Cameron
Preceded by Sir William McMahon	Father of the House of Representatives; 1983	Succeeded by Doug Anthony
