= Minister for Finance (Australia) =

Australian cabinet position

- Commonwealth Coat of Arms

- Flag of Australia

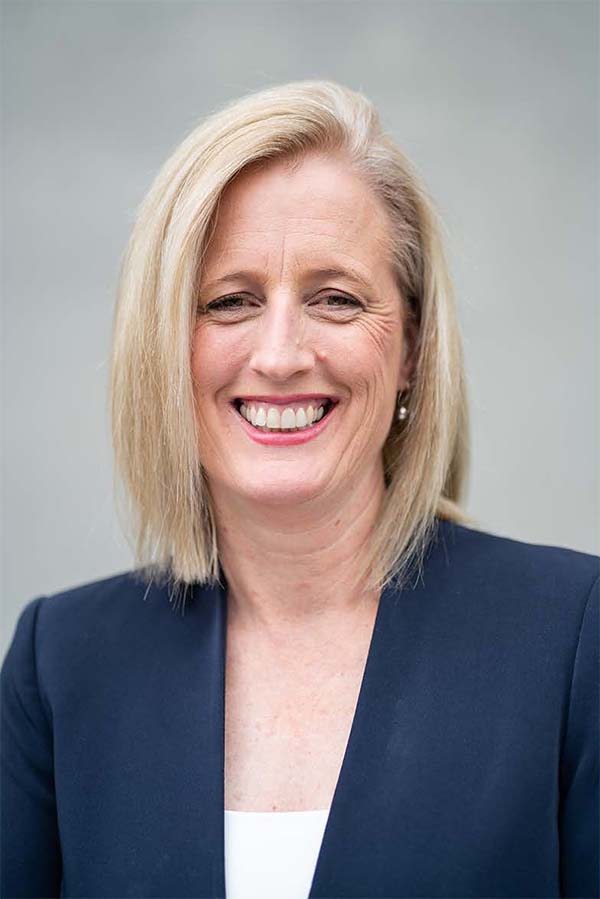
- Incumbent; Katy Gallagher since 23 May 2022
- Department of Finance
- Style: The Honourable
- Appointer: Governor-General on the advice of the prime minister
- Inaugural holder: Phillip Lynch
- Formation: 7 December 1976
- Website: www.financeminister.gov.au

The Minister for Finance is a member of the Cabinet of Australia who is responsible for monitoring government expenditure and financial management. The current minister is Senator Katy Gallagher who has held the position since May 2022.

In the Government of Australia, the minister supplements the role of the Treasurer, being responsible for areas such as government expenditure, financial management, and the operations of government. The minister administers the portfolio through the Department of Finance.

The Finance Minister is in effect the deputy Treasurer (not to be confused with the Assistant Treasurer), as the Finance Minister acts as the Treasurer in the Treasurer's absence. Unlike the Treasurer, who by convention has been a member of the House of Representatives, the Finance Minister may come from either House of Parliament.

== List of ministers ==
The portfolio was first created in 1977 by Malcolm Fraser's Liberal Party of Australia government as Minister for Finance. It was subsequently renamed Minister for Finance and Administration by John Howard's government in 1997, and as Minister for Finance and Deregulation by Kevin Rudd's government in 2007, then returning to Minister for Finance under Tony Abbott in 2013. It took on its current name under Scott Morrison in 2018; the Second Morrison Ministry removed Public Service from the portfolio in May 2019. The following individuals have been appointed as Minister for Finance or any precedent titles:

Order	Minister	Party affiliation	Prime Minister	Ministerial title	Term start	Term end	Term in office
1	Phillip Lynch	Liberal	Fraser	Minister for Finance	7 December 1976	19 November 1977	347 days
2	Eric Robinson	Liberal	Fraser	Minister for Finance	20 November 1977	23 February 1979	1 year, 95 days
3	John Howard	Liberal	Fraser	Minister for Finance	23 February 1979	27 February 1979	4 days
n/a	Eric Robinson	Liberal	Fraser	Minister for Finance	27 February 1979	3 November 1980	1 year, 250 days
4	Dame Margaret Guilfoyle	Liberal	Fraser	Minister for Finance	3 November 1980	11 March 1983	2 years, 128 days
5	John Dawkins	Labor	Hawke	Minister for Finance	11 March 1983	13 December 1984	1 year, 277 days
6	Peter Walsh	Labor	Hawke	Minister for Finance	13 December 1984	4 April 1990	5 years, 112 days
7	Ralph Willis	Labor	Hawke	Minister for Finance	4 April 1990	9 December 1991	1 year, 249 days
8	Kim Beazley	Labor	Hawke	Minister for Finance	9 December 1991	20 December 1991	18 days
8	Kim Beazley	Labor	Keating	Minister for Finance	20 December 1991	27 December 1991	18 days
n/a	Ralph Willis	Labor	Keating	Minister for Finance	27 December 1991	23 December 1993	1 year, 361 days
n/a	Kim Beazley	Labor	Keating	Minister for Finance	23 December 1993	11 March 1996	2 years, 79 days
9	John Fahey	Liberal	Howard	Minister for Finance	11 March 1996	9 October 1997	5 years, 260 days
9	John Fahey	Liberal	Howard	Minister for Finance and Administration	9 October 1997	26 November 2001	5 years, 260 days
10	Nick Minchin	Liberal	Howard	Minister for Finance and Administration	26 November 2001	3 December 2007	6 years, 7 days
11	Lindsay Tanner	Labor	Rudd	Minister for Finance and Deregulation	3 December 2007	24 June 2010	2 years, 274 days
11	Lindsay Tanner	Labor	Gillard	Minister for Finance and Deregulation	24 June 2010	3 September 2010	2 years, 274 days
12	Wayne Swan	Labor	Gillard	Minister for Finance and Deregulation	3 September 2010	14 September 2010	11 days
13	Penny Wong	Labor	Gillard	Minister for Finance and Deregulation	14 September 2010	1 July 2013	3 years, 4 days
13	Penny Wong	Labor	Rudd	Minister for Finance and Deregulation	1 July 2013	18 September 2013	3 years, 4 days
14	Mathias Cormann^{1}	Liberal	Abbott	Minister for Finance	18 September 2013	15 September 2015	7 years, 42 days
14	Mathias Cormann^{1}	Liberal	Turnbull	Minister for Finance	15 September 2015	23 August 2018	7 years, 42 days
14	Mathias Cormann^{1}	Liberal	Morrison	Minister for Finance and the Public Service	28 August 2018	29 May 2019	7 years, 42 days
14	Mathias Cormann^{1}	Liberal	Morrison	Minister for Finance	29 May 2019	30 October 2020	7 years, 42 days
n/a	Scott Morrison^{1}	Liberal	Morrison	Minister for Finance	30 March 2020	23 May 2022	2 years, 54 days
15	Simon Birmingham^{1}	Liberal	Morrison	Minister for Finance	30 October 2020	23 May 2022	1 year, 205 days
16	Katy Gallagher	Labor	Albanese	Minister for Finance	23 May 2022	Incumbent	4 years, 107 days

^{1} Morrison was appointed as Minister for Finance by the Governor-General on Morrison's advice in March 2020, with both Morrison and Cormann holding the position of Minister for Finance until October 2020, and then Morrison and Birmingham until May 2022. However, the appointment of Morrison was not made public until August 2022.

Notwithstanding Philip Lynch, John Howard and Wayne Swan who were Treasurers whilst serving as Finance Minister, two Finance Ministers who were from the House of Representatives, John Dawkins and Ralph Willis, then served as Treasurer. In addition John Fahey (served 1996-2001) had previously served as Treasurer of New South Wales when he was also Premier of that state and current minister Katy Gallagher had previously served as Treasurer of the Australian Capital Territory including when she was also the territory Chief Minister.

== Former ministerial portfolios ==
=== List of ministers for administrative services ===
The first minister responsible for Administrative Services was Fred Daly, although the portfolio was titled Minister for Services and Property from December 1972 until October 1975. The portfolio was abolished with the resignation of David Jull on 25 September 1997 and its responsibilities were absorbed into the portfolio of Finance and Administration on 6 October 1997. The following individuals have been appointed as Minister for Administrative Services, or any precedent titles:

Order	Minister	Party affiliation	Prime Minister	Ministerial title	Term start	Term end	Term in office
1	Fred Daly	Labor	Whitlam	Minister for Services and Property	19 December 1972	7 October 1975	2 years, 327 days
1	Fred Daly	Labor	Whitlam	Minister for Administrative Services	7 October 1975	11 November 1975	2 years, 327 days
2	Tom Drake-Brockman	National	Fraser	Minister for Administrative Services	12 November 1975	22 December 1975	41 days
3	Reg Withers	Liberal	Fraser	Minister for Administrative Services	22 December 1975	7 August 1978	2 years, 228 days
4	Peter Durack	Liberal	Fraser	Minister for Administrative Services	7 August 1978	25 August 1978	18 days
5	Fred Chaney	Liberal	Fraser	Minister for Administrative Services	25 August 1978	5 December 1978	102 days
6	John McLeay	Liberal	Fraser	Minister for Administrative Services	5 December 1978	3 November 1980	1 year, 334 days
7	Kevin Newman	Liberal	Fraser	Minister for Administrative Services	3 November 1980	11 March 1983	2 years, 128 days
8	John Brown	Labor	Hawke	Minister for Administrative Services	11 March 1983	13 December 1984	1 year, 277 days
9	Tom Uren	Labor	Hawke	Minister for Local Government and Administrative Services	13 December 1984	24 July 1987	2 years, 223 days
10	Stewart West	Labor	Hawke	Minister for Administrative Services	24 July 1987	4 April 1990	2 years, 254 days
11	Nick Bolkus	Labor	Hawke	Minister for Administrative Services	4 April 1990	20 December 1991	2 years, 354 days
11	Nick Bolkus	Labor	Keating	Minister for Administrative Services	20 December 1991	24 March 1993	2 years, 354 days
12	Bob McMullan	Labor	Keating	Minister for the Arts and Administrative Services	24 March 1993	30 January 1994	1 year, 1 day
12	Bob McMullan	Labor	Keating	Minister for Administrative Services	30 January 1994	25 March 1994	1 year, 1 day
13	Frank Walker	Labor	Keating	Minister for Administrative Services	25 March 1994	11 March 1996	1 year, 352 days
14	David Jull	Liberal	Howard	Minister for Administrative Services	11 March 1996	25 September 1997	1 year, 198 days
15	John Fahey	Liberal	Howard	Minister for Finance and Administration	9 October 1997	26 November 2001	4 years, 48 days
16	Nick Minchin	Liberal	Howard	Minister for Finance and Administration	26 November 2001	3 December 2007	6 years, 7 days

=== List of assistant ministers for finance ===
The following individuals have been appointed as Assistant Minister for, or any precedent titles:

Order	Minister	Party affiliation	Prime Minister	Ministerial title	Term start	Term end	Term in office
1	David Coleman	Liberal	Turnbull	Assistant Minister for Finance	20 December 2017	28 August 2018	251 days

== See also ==
- Department of Finance
- Assistant Treasurer of Australia
- Minister for Financial Services
- Minister for Finance (New South Wales)
- Minister for Finance (Victoria)
- Minister for Finance (Western Australia)
