= Australian Border Force =

Australian federal law enforcement agency

- ABF Badge

- ABF Flag
- Abbreviation: ABF

Agency overview
- Formed: 1 July 2015; 11 years ago
- Preceding agencies: Customs and Border Protection Service (2009–2015); Immigration Detention and Compliance (2013–2017); Customs Service (1985–2009); Federal Bureau of Narcotics
- Employees: 5,800
- Annual budget: A$1.5 billion (2018)

Jurisdictional structure
- Area: 15,835,100 km² (land and marine)
- Population: 25.1 million (2018 est.)
- Legal jurisdiction: Australia
- Governing body: Australian Government
- Constituting instrument: Australian Border Force Act 2015
- Specialist jurisdictions: National border patrol, security, integrity; Customs, excise, gambling; Coastal patrol, marine border protection, marine search and rescue

Operational structure
- Overseen by: National Anti-Corruption Commission
- Headquarters: Canberra Airport
- Elected officer responsible: Tony Burke, Minister for Home Affairs
- Agency executive: Gavan Reynolds, Commissioner & Comptroller-General of Customs
- Parent agency: Department of Home Affairs
- Functions: 7: Border Protection; Counter Terrorism; Maritime Operations; Enforcement Operations; Immigration Compliance; Detention Operations; Tariff Collection
- Customs Houses: 15: Brisbane; Canberra; Christmas Island; Dampier; Darwin; Geraldton; Melbourne; Nhulunbuy (Gove); Sydney; Perth; Port Adelaide; Port Hedland; Port Lincoln; Port Pirie; Tullamarine

Facilities
- District Offices: 5: Albany; Broome; Bowen; Bunbury; Bundaberg; Cairns; Carnarvon; Coffs Harbour; Eden; Esperance; Gladstone; Launceston; Mackay; Newcastle; RAAF Richmond; Thursday Island; Townsville; Weipa; Wollongong
- Airbases: 15
- Detention Centres: 7: Maribyrnong Immigration Detention Centre; Nauru Regional Processing Centre; Northern Immigration Detention Centre; Perth Immigration Detention Centre; Sydney Immigration Residential Housing; Villawood Immigration Detention Centre; Yongah Hill Immigration Detention Centre

Website
- www.abf.gov.au

The Australian Border Force (ABF) is a federal law enforcement agency of the Australian government responsible for customs, immigration enforcement, and border control. The agency is also responsible for security screening at international ports of entry, including airports and seaports. Through the Marine Unit, the ABF performs coast guard and maritime law enforcement duties and is a component of the Maritime Border Command. The ABF forms part of the larger National Intelligence Community and is an active member of the World Customs Organization.

The ABF was formed under the Australian Border Force Act 2015 with broadened legislative powers, including the introduction of sworn officers. A new uniform was introduced, and following the transition, there was an increase in the number of officers authorised to carry firearms. As of 2016, approximately 15% of the Force is firearms trained, which will increase by 2020 to no less than 25%.

== History ==
=== 1901–1985 – Customs ===
The origins of the Australian Border Force are traced back to the Federation of Australia on 1 January 1901, when the Department of Trade and Customs was formed as one of the first seven Commonwealth Departments of State. On 4 July 1901, the Honorable Charles Kingston announced that Dr. Harry Wollaston would be appointed the first Comptroller-General of Commonwealth Customs. The Customs Act 1901 received royal assent on 4 October 1901 as the sixth Act of Federation, giving Customs legal powers to enforce tariffs, duties and excise.

The 1950s saw large changes to Customs, primarily in the creation of preventative officers; uniformed personnel charged with examining the baggage of incoming passengers, searching vessels, and deterring the importation of contraband into Australia. In 1957, Customs employed its first woman, Athena Antonopoulou, as an interpreter. She was credited with creating the first female uniform, as one did not exist prior. In 1969, Customs expanded its staffing to include detector dogs, to assist in sniffing out illicit substances following similar successes overseas. In December 1969, the Federal Bureau of Narcotics was established within Customs as part of responsibilities transferred by then-prime minister John Gorton to the department. The Bureau conducted operations against illegal drug trafficking, fraud, and smuggling activities. The introduction of this bureau saw Customs acquire broad powers in relation to drug control in a law enforcement capacity, and marked a change from the previous operations of the service.

In 1972, Customs introduced the world's first computerised entry system, the Integrated National System for Processing Entries from Customs Terminals (INSPECT). Before its introduction, all customs entries were processed manually, marking a significant improvement in customs procedures. Similarly, in August 1974 Customs introduced the Passenger Automatic Selection System (PASS), as a standard method of alert-list checking at the airport, replacing cumbersome and time-consuming Teledex machines for sourcing passenger information. In 1975, Customs was briefly merged with the Commonwealth Police, Northern Territory Police and ACT Police to form the Australia Police (the failed precursor to the Australian Federal Police and part of the Department of Police and Customs) by the Whitlam government. After six months of operations, following the 1975 Australian constitutional crisis, the department was dismantled, the Australia Police disbanded, and the Bureau of Customs was transferred to the Department of Business and Consumer Affairs.

In 1976 Customs introduced the Customs On-Line Method of Preparing for Invoices Lodgeable Entries (COMPILE) system. The system allowed agents and importers to use visual display units and printers in their offices to connect to departmental systems. The system was so successful it was only decommissioned in 2006, with the introduction of the Integrated Cargo System (ICS). On 6 November 1980, at the recommendation of the Williams Royal Commission, the Australian Narcotics Bureau was disbanded by the Fraser government. The government re-purposed Customs as the agency responsible for enforcing federal laws relating to importation of drugs at the border. The Australian Federal Police assumed responsibility for drug enforcement operations onshore. In 1982 the Bureau of Customs was transferred to the portfolio of the Department of Industry, Technology and Commerce and formally became the Australian Customs Service.

=== 1985–2009 – Australian Customs Service ===
On 10 June 1985, the Government of Australia formally established the Australian Customs Service (ACS) as an independent agency of the Australian Public Service within the portfolio of the Minister for Industry, Technology and Commerce. The statutory office of Comptroller-General of Customs, responsible for administering the ACS, was also established on that date. The Australian Customs Service formally commenced operations on 1 July 1985.

In August 1988, the Australian Coastal Surveillance Organisation became Coastwatch and was transferred to the Australian Customs Service. The organisation assumed the role of coordinating all civil maritime surveillance on behalf of the Australian government. In October 1998, the Australian Customs Service was transferred to the portfolio of the Attorney-General's Department. That same month, machinery of government changes removed the administration of excise duties from Customs and transferred them to the Australian Taxation Office, with 248 staff transferred by July 1999 and the end of a 98-year history of collecting excise duties on manufactured alcohol, tobacco and petroleum products. In 1999, the Australian Customs Service conducted its first support role for United Nations in assisting to establish border control in East Timor, following the 1999 East Timorese crisis.

In January 2001, the Australian Customs Service celebrated 100 years of service with the Centenary of Federation.

Border Protection Command (BPC) was established in 2005 as the leader and coordinator of Australian maritime security operations. It brought together elements of the Australian Defence Force, Australian Fisheries Management Authority, Australian Maritime Safety Authority, and the Department of Agriculture, Fisheries and Forestry. As part of the introduction of BPC, the Australian Customs Service and Royal Australian Navy take the lead on commanding and controlling Operation Resolute.

In December 2008, then Prime Minister Kevin Rudd announced that the Australian Government would be augmenting, re-tasking and renaming the Australian Customs Service to create the new Australian Customs and Border Protection Service. Royal assent was given to the changes on 22 May 2009 and the Australian Customs and Border Protection Service was established thereafter, remaining within the Attorney General's Department.

=== 2009–2015 – Australian Customs and Border Protection Service ===
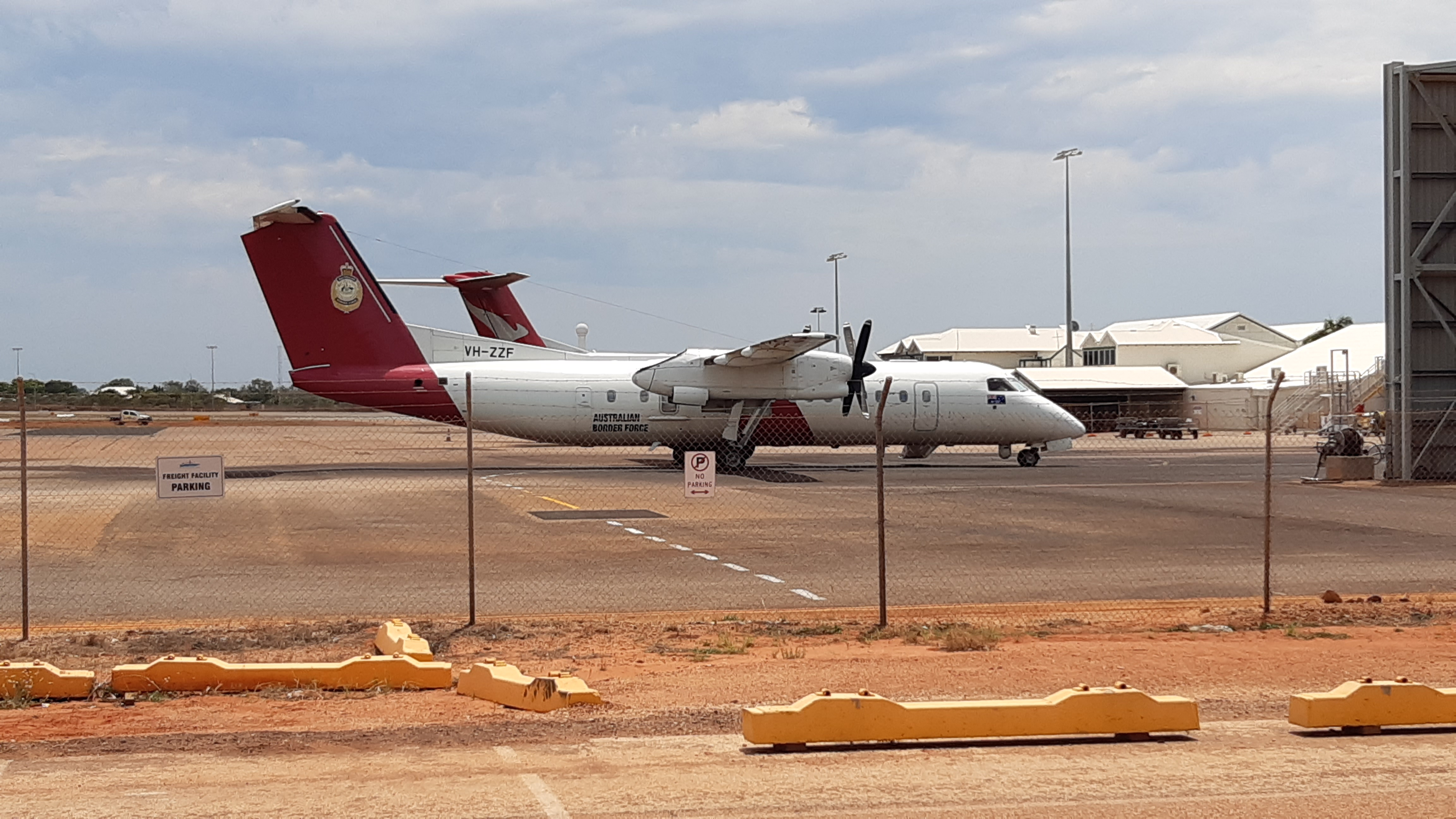
An Australian Border Force plane at Broome Airport, in the north of Western Australia

Operation Sovereign Borders was announced in September 2013 by Minister for Immigration and Border Protection Scott Morrison and Lieutenant General Angus Campbell as a Joint Agency Task Force to bring together 16 different agencies to coordinate the whole-of-government response to illegal maritime arrivals. The Australian Customs and Border Protection Service is then formally moved from the Attorney General's Department to the newly formed Department of Immigration and Border Protection.

In May 2014, Morrison announced large changes to the border protection arrangements within Australia, through the consolidation of all frontline immigration and customs functions in a single organisation, the Australian Border Force. As a result, Regional Commands are established across Australia to provide local Command and Control functions. Each Regional Command became responsible for the deployment of Border Force Officers in specified geographic areas to achieve strategic outcomes. The Australian Border Force was formally established on 1 July 2015. The new agency to be based on the hybrid of the United Kingdom Border Force model.

=== 2015–present – Australian Border Force ===
The ABF was established on 1 July 2015, merging the Australian Customs and Border Protection Service with the immigration detention and compliance functions of the then Department of Immigration and Border Protection.

== Organisation ==
=== Commissioners ===
The Commissioner of the Australian Border Force serves concurrently as the Comptroller-General of Customs.

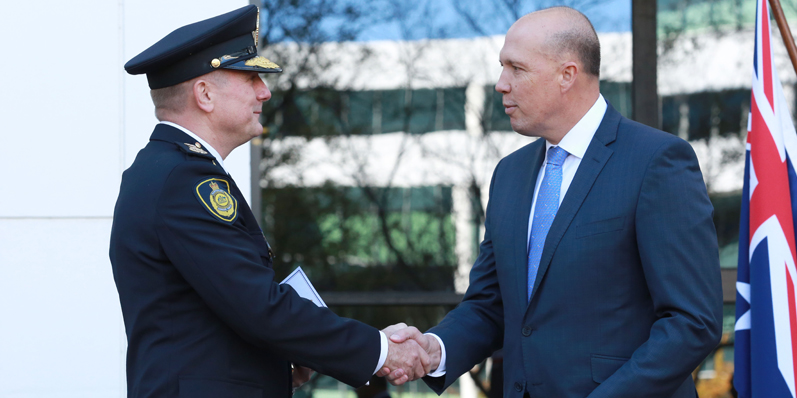
The swearing-in of Michael Outram (left) as Commissioner of the Australian Border Force in May 2018.

Rank	Name	Post-nominals	Term began	Term ended
Commissioner	Roman Quaedvlieg	APM	1 July 2015	3 July 2017
Commissioner	Michael Outram	APM	3 July 2017	9 November 2024
Commissioner	Gavan Reynolds	AO	10 November 2024	Incumbent

=== Structure ===
As of 2022, the Australian Border Force has 5,968 staff spread across 70 locations. ABF is divided into 2 administrative groups overseen by senior ABF or APS employees and 2 operational groups each led by an ABF Deputy Commissioner.

Commissioner of the Australian Border Force and Comptroller-General of Customs

- Chief of Staff

Customs Group (Deputy Comptroller-General of Customs)

- Customs and Trade Policy (Assistant Secretary)
- Trusted Trader and Trade Compliance (Assistant Secretary)
- Special Investigations (Commander)
- Ministerial, Governance, Risk and Assurance (Chief Superintendent)

Industry and Border Systems Group

- Customs and Border Modernisation (Assistant Secretary)
- Traveller Policy and Industry Engagement (Assistant Secretary)
- Border Systems and Program Management (Commander)
- Strategic Coordination (Assistant Secretary)
- Industry and Border Systems Program Coordination (Senior Director)

South, East and Workforce (Deputy Commissioner)

- South (Assistant Commissioner)
  - Aviation and Regional Operations South (Commander)
  - Maritime and Enforcement South (Commander)
  - Operations South Australia (Chief Superintendent)
- East (Assistant Commissioner)
  - Trade and Travel East (Commander)
  - Enforcement and Detained Goods East (Commander)
- ABF Workforce (Assistant Commissioner)
  - Operational Readiness (Commander)
  - Workforce Management (Commander)
  - ABF College (Commander)
  - Workforce Capability (Commander)

North, West and Detention (Deputy Commissioner)

- North and Detention (Assistant Commissioner)
  - Operations Queensland (Commander)
  - Operations North (Commander)
  - National Detention Operations (Commander)
  - Detention Governance, Strategy and Standards (Chief Superintendent)
  - Detention Contract Management (Senior Director)
  - National Removals (Chief Superintendent)
- Operation Sovereign Borders (OSB JATF) (RAN Rear Admiral)
  - Chief of Operations (ADF Senior Officer)
  - Deputy Commander OSB JATF
  - Maritime Border Command (MBC) (Commander)
  - Deputy Commander MBC
- West and Close Support Command (Assistant Commissioner)
  - Operations West (Commander)
  - Air and Marine Capability (Commander)
  - Marine Workforce Capability (Commander)
- Operational Coordination and Planning (Assistant Commissioner)
  - Tactical Capability (Commander)
  - Australian Border Operations Centre (Commander)
  - International Operations and Coordination (Commander)
  - National Planning and Targeting (Commander)

=== Marine Unit ===
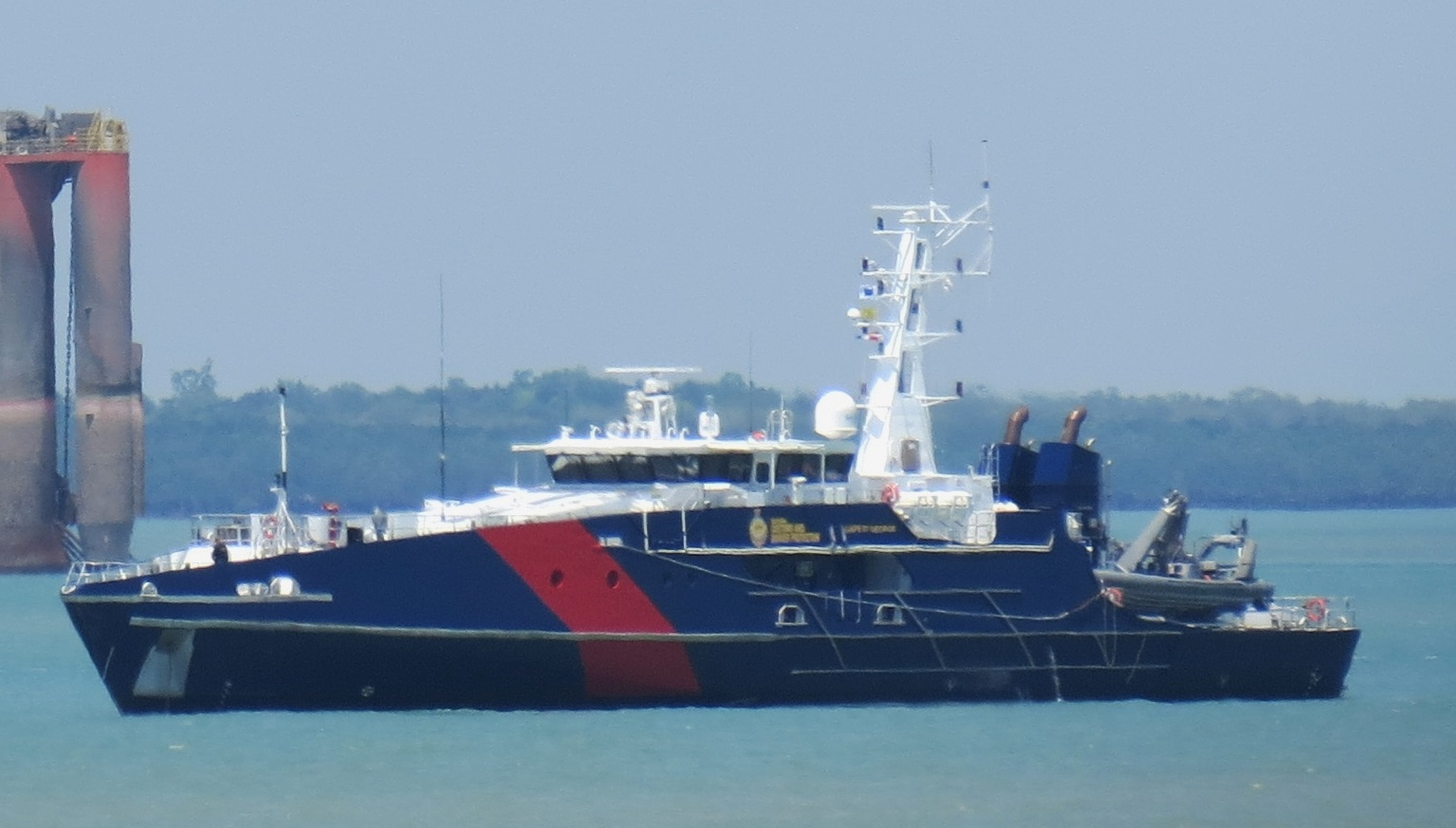
A Cape-class patrol boat of the Marine Unit (Coast Guard) in Darwin, Northern Territory

ABF maintains a fleet of ships and several coastal patrol vessels which perform maritime patrol duties. The majority of ABF's vessels are assigned to Maritime Border Command and operate alongside the Royal Australian Navy (RAN)'s patrol boat group. ABF vessels are staffed by Marine Tactical Officers (MTO), Engineers, Technical Officers, and other specialists who receive extra training in seamanship, navigation, and boarding operations. ABF Ships are prefixed with Australian Border Force Cutter (ABFC).

=== Counter Terrorism Unit ===
To better enhance the capabilities of the ABF to deal with national security threats, the Counter Terrorism Unit (CTU) was established. CTU officers are based at eight major Australian international airports and proactively intercept inbound and outbound passengers of national security interest. ABF officers of the Counter Terrorism Unit receive use of force training and are equipped with personal defensive equipment (PDE) including firearms.

=== Detector dogs ===
Australian Border Force breeds, trains and utilises detector dogs for the purposes of detecting prohibited and restricted goods on people, in products and in large areas. Such substances include illicit drugs, firearms, explosives, currency and tobacco. The detector dog program is based in a purpose-built facility in Melbourne, Victoria. Dogs are selectively bred and trained for at least seven months. Dogs are evaluated at 4, 6, 8, 10 and 12 months of age. 60 to 70 percent of dogs bred by Australian Border Force enter operational service, with the remainder sold to the general public. Dogs which complete the training program are used by the Australian Federal Police, Department of Agriculture, State and territory police forces, correctional services, Seeing Eye Dogs Australia, Australian Defence Force and various undisclosed international agencies.

== Passenger profiling and watchlists ==
The Australian Border Force uses a "big data" analysis ecosystem to monitor people and cargo entering and leaving Australia. This includes the use of machine learning capabilities across a range of analytical platforms that draw together multiple data sources to provide insights. The Central Movement Alert List (CMAL) is an electronic watch list, containing information about individuals who pose either an immigration or national security concern to the Australian Government as well as information on lost, stolen or fraudulent travel documents. CMAL comprises two databases, the Person Alert List (PAL) and the Document Alert List (DAL). The PAL database stores the biographical details of identities of concern, and DAL is a list of lost, fraudulent or stolen travel documents. PAL records are categorized according to the reason for listing the identity—the alert reason code (ARC). There are 19 ARCs, with each being categorised as high, medium, or low risk.

Australian Members of Parliament have expressed concerns about the lack of systematic control over data input and maintenance of the Alert List, stating that Australian citizens and visitors may suffer inconvenience or harassment due to misinformation or incorrect information being entered into the system. The Australian Border Force receives Passenger Name Record data from airlines operating into and out of Australia. PNR data is information about passengers that is held by airlines on their computer reservation system. PNR data includes approximately 106 different fields such as passenger name(s), sex, passport number, nationality, travel companions, frequent flyer Information, date and place of ticket issue, contact phone numbers, credit card number and expiry date, number of bags, seat allocation, and the passenger's full itinerary.

== Personnel ==
=== Ranks and insignia ===
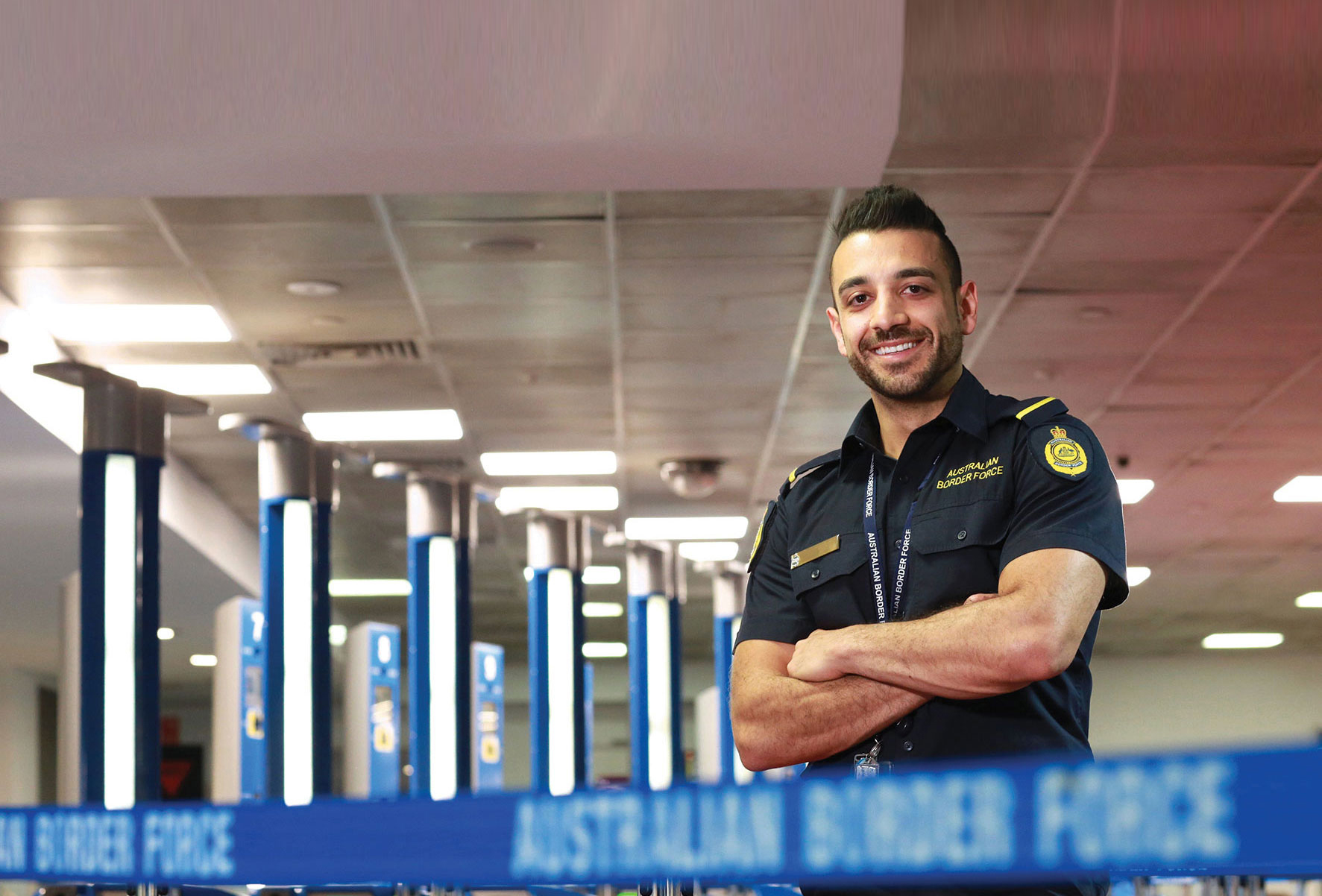
ABF officer in an airport.

The Australian Border Force has its own rank structure. Uniformed Australian Border Force officers have their rank displayed on their shoulder epaulettes, attached to shirts, jumpers or jackets. The rank and epaulette styling is in line with many other border agencies and shares close similarities with its United Kingdom counterpart, the Border Force. The uniforms are dark navy blue and feature shoulder patches of the ABF logo on them. The ABF rank insignia have four components placed against an ink navy coloured field:

- Crown of St. Edward
- Star of the Order of the Bath
- Portcullis encompassed by a gold laurel wreath
- Gold bar/s

ABF Front line Officer ranks and insignia (commonly seen at Airports, Seaports, Border Patrol, Enforcement & Maritime Ops, Air Cargo, Container Examination Facility, Postal Exams, Detector Dog Unit.)
Rank	Border Force Supervisor	Senior Border Force Officer	Leading Border Force Officer	Border Force Officer	Assistant Border Force Officer (level 2)	Assistant Border Force Officer (level 1)
Australian Public Service (APS) level	APS 6	APS 5	APS 4	APS 3	APS 2	APS 1
Insignia						

ABF Executive level ranks and insignia
Rank	Commissioner of the ABF (Comptroller-General of Customs)	Deputy Commissioner of the ABF	Assistant Commissioner of the ABF	Commander (Regional Commander)	Border Force Chief Superintendent	Border Force Superintendent	Border Force Inspector
Australian Public Service (APS) level	Department Secretary/Director-General/CEO	SES 3	SES 2	SES 1		EL 2	EL 1
Insignia							

== Law enforcement powers ==
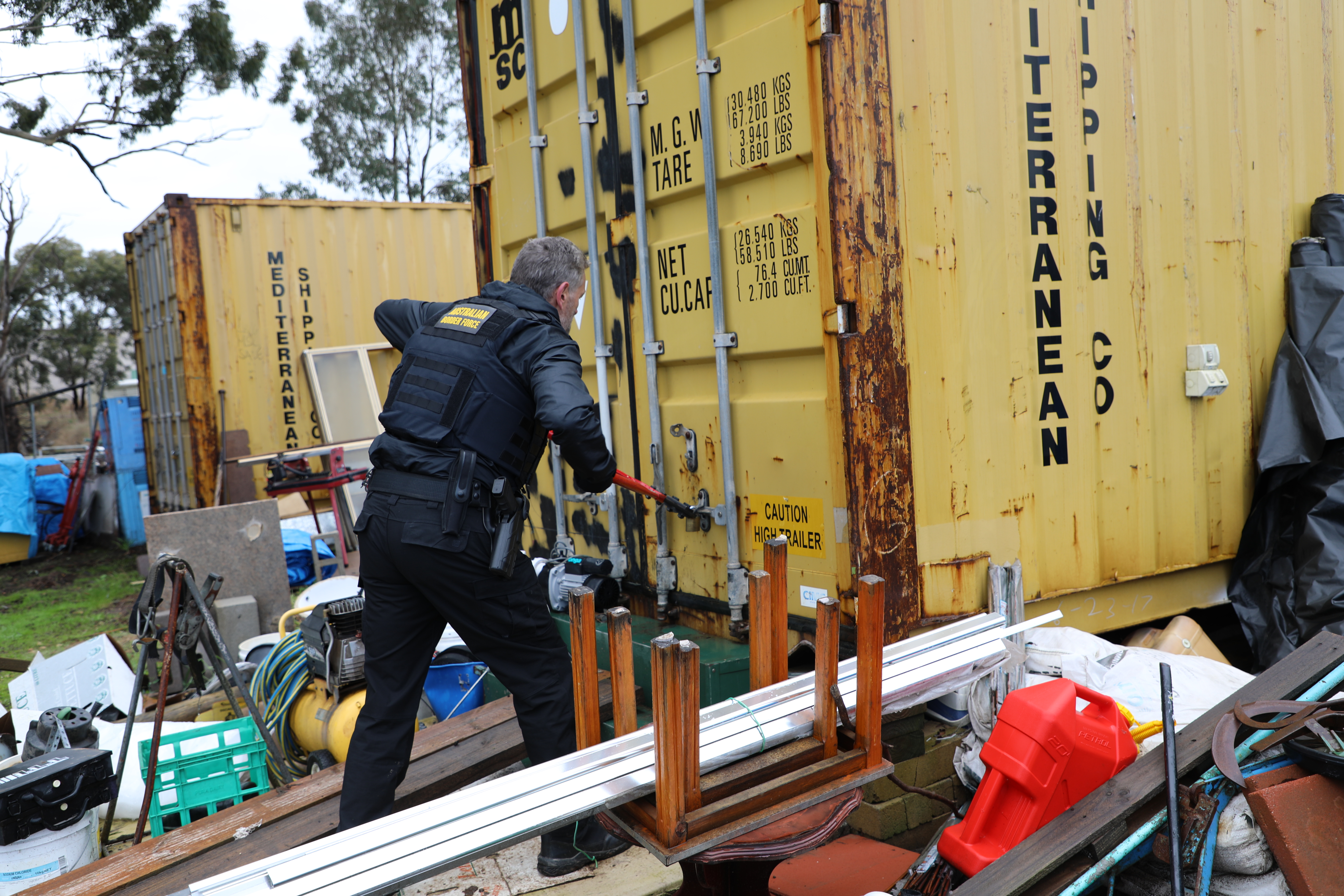
An ABF Investigator of the Illicit Tobacco Taskforce (ITTF) forces entry into a container.

Australian Border Force officers' law enforcement powers are primarily derived from the Customs Act 1901 (Cth) and the Migration Act 1958 (Cth) which empower officers to enforce Australian Customs and immigration laws. These laws empower officers to carry arms, conduct arrests and searches under specific circumstances, and allow officers to detain persons suspected of committing certain state and federal offenses or who are subject to a warrant when that person is in a designated place such as an Airport or Port. Australian Border Force officers do not enjoy the same level of law enforcement powers as members of the Australian Federal Police and are not considered constables at common law; however, many Commonwealth laws provide additional powers to Australian Border Force officers including arrest and search powers. For example, the Environment Protection and Biodiversity Conservation Act 1999, Aviation Transport Security Act 2004 and the Fisheries Management Act 1991 each confer additional search and arrest powers among other powers on Australian Border Force officers.

In addition to the powers mentioned above, Marine Unit officers can be granted wide-sweeping powers when authorized under the Maritime Powers Act 2013. This authorization allows for wide-sweeping search and arrest powers, including for state offences. Authorization under the Maritime Powers Act can only be made by certain officers and commanders and can only be made in limited circumstances and for limited periods of time. A 2017 report from the Australian National Audit Office found that 534 provisions in Commonwealth legislation conferred powers on Australian Border Force officers; these powers ranged from questioning to arrest, detain and search powers. The report found a series of issues surrounding the ABF's training in the use of their powers; the report made recommendations to improve training and oversight, all of which were agreed to or agreed to in part by the Australian Border Force.

== Training and equipment ==
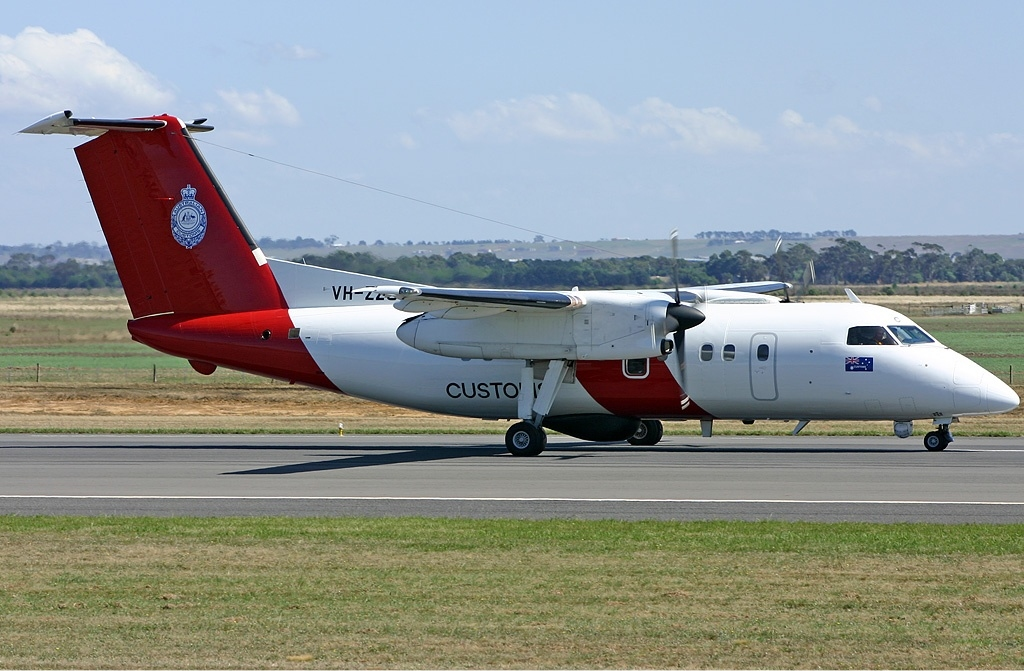
A contracted Surveillance Australia Dash 8 aircraft (Coast Guard).

Australian Border Force recruits are trained over the course of 12 months in both classroom and operational environments. Officers receive training in basic law enforcement duties and customs clearance and examination procedures and undergo physical assessments. ABF Officers are required to obtain a security clearance before beginning their training and maintain it for the duration of their employment. Before the standing up of the Australian Border Force, the Australian Customs and Border Protection Service had Officers in certain operational instances where they were armed with Personal Defensive Equipment (PDE). These Officers were generally those who worked in Enforcement Operations, Investigations, and the Marine Unit. Since 1 July 2015, with the creation of the Australian Border Force came a change in direction and environment. The ABF has adopted a greater forcus on law enforcement to help adapt itself to the increasing threat of terrorism, on both a global and local standpoint, people smuggling, and highly organised criminal syndicates and organisations. As a result, the ABF allows its officers to carry firearms and PDE at all major Australian international airports. Australian Border Force officers are supplied with the Glock 17 9mm semi-automatic pistol. ASP 21-inch telescopic baton, SAF-LOK MK5 hinged handcuffs, Oleoresin Capsicum (OC) Spray. The Marine Unit officers are equipped with the Glock 17 and Remington 870 shotgun. The Marine Unit vessels are equipped similarly to RAN vessels with the M2 Browning 12.7mm machine gun that is on loan from the Australian Defence Force. The Australian Border Force also has an aviation Coast Guard component operating a fleet of ten privately contracted Dash 8 aircraft which operate alongside the Royal Australian Air Force (RAAF) in the Maritime Border Command.

=== Patrol Vessels ===
The Marine Unit, formerly the Australian Customs Service National Marine Unit, is a division of the Australian Border Force (ABF) which acts as a coast guard for Australia's coastline and territorial waters. The Marine Unit focuses on surveillance and response activities within the Australian Exclusive Economic Zone, and the operation and training of ships and crews for these purposes.

Vessels operated by the Marine Unit include:

- ABFC Ocean Shield, a multi-role ship primarily used for offshore patrols in the Southern Ocean and sealift capabilities.
- ABFC Thaiyak, which is primarily stationed at the Ashmore and Cartier Islands.
- Cape-class patrol boats - 8 active, 2 under construction, 4 ordered.
- Bay-class patrol boats - 2 active, both of which are slated to be replaced by new Cape-class boats.

== Controversy ==
=== Misconduct ===
In 2015, an Australian Border Force officer confiscated a passenger's mobile phone and laptop, demanded their passwords, and sent text messages without the passenger's knowledge or consent. The officer was disciplined and the passenger sued the Australian Border Force.

In 2017, commissioner Roman Quaedvlieg was suspended and placed on paid leave, pending an investigation into his conduct by the Australian Commission for Law Enforcement Integrity. He was later sacked over abuse of power, having helped his partner pursue a job at the Australian Border Force and failing to disclose his relationship with her. There was media criticism that Quaedvlieg was paid in excess of $500,000 between May 2017 and February 2018 while on paid leave. The Australian National Audit Office found instances of potentially unlawful searches and failure by the Australian Border Force to comply with instructions under the Customs Act 1901 and the Migration Act 1958. It found that 29% of airport searches were unlawful because one or more officers involved were not authorised to search. An Australian Border Force officer and former customs officer was arrested for their involvement in an international drug and tobacco ring operating between Sydney and Dubai. The drug ring was part of a conspiracy to import 200 kg of MDMA via sea cargo and were responsible for smuggling 50 million cigarettes into Australia.

In 2021, an officer defrauded the Australian Border Force of $93,898.75 by using his work credit card for unauthorised cash withdrawals and other expenses. He was also found to have used fake medical certificates to obtain sick leave and two fake statutory declarations to substantiate charges to his work credit card.

=== Saudi Arabia asylum ===
In 2019, a Four Corners report found that Saudi Arabian women traveling to Australia to seek asylum were being questioned by the Australian Border Force about why they weren't traveling with their male guardian. Despite making their asylum claims clear, they had their visas blocked and were deported.

== Notable operations ==
- Operation Sovereign Borders – A joint agency operation introduced to minimise the amount of unlawful maritime arrivals and people smuggling into Australia's border.
- Taskforce Cadena – The Australian Government established Taskforce Cadena in June 2015 to target and disrupt the criminals organising visa fraud, illegal work and the exploitation of foreign workers.
- Serious Financial Crime Taskforce – An Australian Taxation Office-led joint agency taskforce established to target serious offences relating to fraud, money laundering and defrauding the Commonwealth.
- Operation Fortitude – A visa checking operation was held in Melbourne in August 2015, Operation Fortitude. It was cancelled following protests and community concern that racial profiling would take place. In addition, concerns were raised over the immigration system's "militarisation". On the day of Operation Fortitude's launch, over 200 protestors converged on Flinders Street railway station in Melbourne, at the same time as Operation Fortitude was officially launched by the ABF and Victoria Police. In October 2015, talking points released by the ABF revealed that the focus of the exercise would have been taxi ranks.

== Media ==
Border Security: Australia's Front Line is a TV series that follows the work of officers within the Department of Home Affairs, Australian Border Force, and Biosecurity, as they enforce Australian immigration, customs, quarantine/biosecurity and finance laws based on factual events. ABF officers and investigators were featured in the 2017 ABC documentary series Keeping Australia Safe.

== See also ==
- Border Force and Immigration Enforcement in the United Kingdom
- U.S. Customs and Border Protection and U.S. Immigration and Customs Enforcement
- Canada Border Services Agency
- New Zealand Customs Service
- Singapore Maritime Security Task Force
