= Yeend =

Yeend is a surname. Notable people with the surname include:

- Adam J. Yeend (born 1980), Australian actor and producer
- Frances Yeend (1913–2008), American soprano
- Geoffrey Yeend (1927–1994), Australian public servant
