= Tom Hayes (public servant) =

Australian public servant

Tom Hayes AO

Secretary of the Department of Business and Consumer Affairs
- In office 14 March 1982 – 7 May 1982

Secretary of the Department of Industry and Commerce
- In office 7 May 1982 – 13 December 1984

Secretary of the Department of Industry, Technology and Commerce
- In office 13 December 1984 – 12 March 1985

Comptroller-General of the Australian Customs Service
- In office 1 July 1985 – 1988

Personal details
- Born: Thomas Plunkett Hayes
- Occupation: Public servant

Thomas Plunkett Hayes AO is a retired senior Australian public servant, best known for his time at the Australian Customs Service.

== Life and career ==
Hayes was appointed to the position of Secretary of the Department of Business and Consumer Affairs starting in March 1982. He transitioned into a new position as head of the Department of Industry and Commerce in May 1982, which was described in media as "because of changes in administrative arrangements... mostly his old department".

In 1984, the Department of Industry and Commerce was abolished, and replaced with the Department of Industry, Technology and Commerce, and Hayes moved into the new Department in the Secretary position.

When the Australian Customs Service was established in 1985, splitting out from the Department of Industry, Technology and Commerce, Hayes was appointed its Comptroller-General. At the time, Hayes said the Customs service required the full-time attention of its top executive.

In 1988, Hayes left his position at the Australian Customs Service to take up the post of Secretary-General of the Customs Cooperation Council in Brussels (now known as the World Customs Organization).

== Awards ==
Hayes was made an Officer of the Order of Australia in June 1992 for service to international organisations, and for his public service.

Government offices
Preceded by Tim Besley	Secretary of the Department of Business and Consumer Affairs; 1982	Succeeded by Himself as Secretary of the Department of Industry and Commerce
Preceded by Himself as Secretary of the Department of Business and Consumer Affairs	Secretary of the Department of Industry and Commerce; 1982 – 1984	Succeeded by Himself as Secretary of the Department of Industry, Technology and Commerce
Preceded by Neil Currie as Secretary of the Department of Industry and Commerce (I)	Secretary of the Department of Industry and Commerce; 1982 – 1984	Succeeded by Himself as Secretary of the Department of Industry, Technology and Commerce
Preceded by Himself as Secretary of the Department of Industry and Commerce	Secretary of the Department of Industry, Technology and Commerce; 1984 – 1985	Succeeded by David Charles
Preceded by Himself as Secretary of the Department of Industry, Technology and Commerce	Comptroller-General of the Australian Customs Service; 1985 – 1988	Succeeded by Frank Kelly
