= Customs and Border Protection =

Customs and Border Protection may refer to:

- Australian Customs and Border Protection Service
- United States Customs and Border Protection
