= Roman Quaedvlieg =

Australian former public servant and police officer

Roman Quaedvlieg APM

Commissioner of the Australian Border Force
- In office 1 July 2015 – 15 March 2018
- Preceded by: New creation
- Succeeded by: Michael Outram

Comptroller-General of Customs
- In office 13 October 2014 – 15 March 2018
- Preceded by: Mike Pezzullo
- Succeeded by: Michael Outram

CEO of Australian Customs and Border Protection Service
- In office 13 October 2014 – 30 June 2015
- Preceded by: Mike Pezzullo
- Succeeded by: Role abolished

Chief Police Officer of ACT Policing
- In office 2010–2013
- Preceded by: Michael Phelan
- Succeeded by: Rudi Lammers

Personal details
- Born: Roman Alexander Quaedvlieg Toronto, Ontario, Canada
- Spouse: Kristine Pajda (2004–2017)
- Domestic partner: Sarah Rogers
- Education: Queensland University of Technology; Melbourne Business School, University of Melbourne
- Law enforcement service: QPS (1985–2000); ACC (2002–2005); AFP (2005–2013); ACBPS (2013–2015); ABF (2015–2018)

Roman Alexander Quaedvlieg (born 8 January 1965) is a Canadian-born Australian former public servant and police officer who was the Commissioner of the Australian Border Force until he was terminated.

He was also a police officer in Queensland, then with the Australian Federal Police. He then joined the Australian Customs and Border Protection Service.

== Education ==
Quaedvlieg was educated at Redcliffe State High School. Quaedvlieg has a Bachelor of Justice from the Queensland University of Technology, and a Master of Business Administration from the Melbourne Business School (MBS) of the University of Melbourne, Victoria, Australia.

== Career ==
A career police officer, Quaedvlieg served as a sworn member of the Queensland Police Service for 15 years, where he performed duties in a range of positions investigating and managing serious and organised criminal activity. From 2000 to 2002 he was an executive with Ansett Australia.

2005

In 2005, Quaedvlieg joined the Australian Federal Police (AFP) and assumed the position of Manager Economic Operations, with responsibility for financial and economic investigations including money-laundering, large-scale fraud against the Commonwealth, proceeds of crime recovery, identity crime enforcement, and the management of the Oil-for-Food Task Force.

In 2007, Quaedvlieg was promoted to Assistant Commissioner at the AFP and assumed responsibility for Border Operations, which encompassed investigations of major drug importation and trafficking, people-smuggling activity, sexual servitude, and child sex tourism offences. Quaedvlieg has also performed the role of National Manager Aviation (at the Assistant Commissioner level) and was the AFP Chief of Staff for a period of time, a role which incorporated responsibility for the governance mechanisms of the AFP, including Ministerial Liaison, National Media and Marketing, Legal Services, Professional Standards, Recognition and Ceremonial, and Executive Services.

2010

In 2010, Quaedvlieg became the chief police officer of ACT Policing, the branch of the AFP responsible for providing policing services to the Australian Capital Territory (ACT).

Quaedvlieg was awarded the Australian Police Medal (APM) in 2011 for serving the Australian community with distinction, particularly in the areas of police operations and administration.

In 2013, Quaedvlieg joined the Australian Customs and Border Protection Service (ACBPS) as deputy chief executive officer. In October 2014 he succeeded Mike Pezzullo as chief executive officer.

With the introduction of the Australian Border Force (ABF) in 2015, Quaedvlieg became the inaugural Commissioner of the Australian Border Force and the Comptroller-General of Customs.

2017

As of 29 May 2017, he was on leave pending an active investigation conducted by the Australian Commission for Law Enforcement Integrity into Quaedvlieg's alleged abuse of power. The investigation examined his assistance in obtaining employment at Sydney Airport for a person he was in a relationship with, and concealing that relationship. Quaedvlieg declined to resign, stating that to do so would be "tantamount to a concession of culpability". Martin Parkinson, the secretary of the Department of Prime Minister and Cabinet also wrote a report on Quaedvlieg's behaviour, and Christian Porter, the attorney-general, was asked to rule on the case to avoid questions of disfavour that may have arisen had Peter Dutton ruled on Quaedvlieg's case. There was media criticism that Quaedvlieg was on paid leave during this time, and reportedly was paid in excess of $500,000 between May 2017 and February 2018.

In March 2018, the Governor-General, acting on the advice of the Australian cabinet, terminated Quaedvlieg's appointment as commissioner on the grounds of his misbehaviour.

== Honours ==
Honours and awards	Date awarded	Citation
Australian Police Medal (APM)	26 January 2011	
National Police Service Medal	2016	
National Medal	2005	

State

- G20 Citation.
- Queensland Police Service Medal.

== Personal life ==
Quaedvlieg has three children.

Police appointments
Preceded by Michael Phelan	Chief Police Officer of ACT Policing; 2010–2013	Succeeded by Rudi Lammers
Civic offices
Preceded by Mike Pezzullo	Comptroller-General of Customs; 2014–2018	Succeeded by Michael Outram as Acting Comptroller-General of Customs
Preceded by Mike Pezzullo	CEO of Australian Customs and Border Protection Service; 2014–2015	Succeeded by Self as Commissioner of the Australian Border Force created
Police appointments
Preceded by Self as CEO of Australian Customs and Border Protection Service	Commissioner of the Australian Border Force; 2015–2018	Succeeded by Michael Outram as Acting Commissioner of the Australian Border Force
