= Michael Carmody =

Australian public servant

Michael Carmody AO

Commissioner of Taxation
- In office January 1993 – 31 December 2005

Chief Executive Officer of the Australian Customs Service
- In office 1 January 2006 – 22 May 2009

Chief Executive Officer of the Australian Customs and Border Protection Service
- In office 22 May 2009 – 4 September 2012

Personal details
- Education: University of Melbourne
- Occupation: Public servant

Michael Joseph Carmody AO is a retired senior Australian public servant. He was the Commissioner of Taxation of the Commonwealth of Australia from January 1993 to 31 December 2005 and the chief executive officer of the Australian Customs and Border Protection Service until 4 September 2012.

== Life and career ==
Carmody attended secondary school at St. Bernard's College, Melbourne.

Carmody joined the ATO in Melbourne in 1968, later moving to the ATO's National Office in Canberra in 1973. There he was involved in a wide range of taxation issues, including tax avoidance, legislation and tax reform.

In 1983, Carmody relocated to Sydney where he assumed the role of First Assistant Deputy Commissioner. Later in the same year, he assumed the role of Deputy Commissioner in the ATO's Parramatta branch.

Returning to National Office in 1986, Carmody was appointed as Second Commissioner in charge of revenue collection and audit, and in the following year, leader of the ATO's "modernisation program".

Carmody holds a Bachelor of Commerce from the University of Melbourne, and he attended Harvard University's six-week Advanced Management Program in 1989.

Carmody was appointed Commissioner of Taxation in 1993. During his time as Commissioner, he was highly regarded internationally for what was viewed as an innovative approach to tax administration. During his almost 13-year career as Federal Commissioner of Taxation, Carmody oversaw the modernisation of the Australian Taxation Office ("ATO"), the implementation of a number of significant reforms to the Australian taxation system, and the design and implementation of a new compliance management program.

Carmody's leadership of the ATO led to its push to encourage taxpayers to deal with the ATO and other Government agencies electronically.

On 10 November 2005 Carmody announced that he would be leaving the office of Federal Commissioner of Taxation to take up a position as chief executive officer of the then Australian Customs Service, replacing Lionel Woodward. He was replaced by Second Commissioner Michael D’Ascenzo from 1 January 2006. Carmody was made an Officer of the Order of Australia in 2005 for his work in tax administration

Carmody's retirement was announced by the Minister for Home Affairs and Minister for Justice Jason Clare on 24 August 2012. Clare described Carmody as a 44-year giant of the Commonwealth Public Service and reflected that his intellect, capacity and decency would be sorely missed by all in the Commonwealth Public Sector.

== Awards ==
Carmody was made an Officer of the Order of Australia in 2005 for his work in Tax administration.

Government offices
| Preceded by Trevor Boucher | Commissioner of Taxation; 1993–2005 | Succeeded by Michael D'Ascenzo |
| Preceded by Lionel Woodward | Chief Executive Officer of the Australian Customs Service; 2006–2009 | Succeeded by Himself as Chief Executive Officer of the Australian Customs and Border Protection Service |
| Preceded by Himself as Chief Executive Officer of the Australian Customs Service | Chief Executive Officer of the Australian Customs and Border Protection Service; 2009–2012 | Succeeded by Mike Pezzullo |
