= Michael Outram =

Australian law enforcement officer

Michael Outram APM
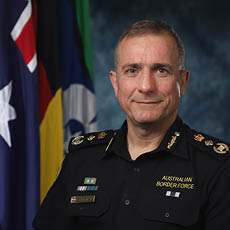

2nd Commissioner of the Australian Border Force
- In office 14 May 2018 – 9 November 2024
- Preceded by: Roman Quaedvlieg
- Succeeded by: Gavan Reynolds

Comptroller-General of Customs
- In office 14 May 2018 – 9 November 2024
- Preceded by: Roman Quaedvlieg
- Succeeded by: Gavan Reynolds

Assistant Commissioner of the Australian Federal Police
- In office 2011–2015

Michael Outram is an Australian law enforcement officer and the Commissioner of the Australian Border Force from 2018 to 2024. He has served as a law enforcement officer for over 30 years and previously served with the Australian Federal Police.

== Career ==
=== Before AFP ===
Outram served as a detective in the London Metropolitan Police prior to migrating to Australia in 2002 and later joining the Australian Federal Police.

=== Australian Federal Police ===
Outram served as an Assistant Commissioner in the Australian Federal Police where he led the AFP's protection operations, including the close personal protection of high office holders, uniformed protection of commonwealth buildings, and Australia's witness protection program. Outram was also responsible for the AFP's operational response to the downing of Malaysia Airlines Flight 17 by Russia in Ukraine and the G20 Summit in Brisbane.

=== Australian Border Force ===
==== Deputy Commissioner ====
Outram began his role at Australian Customs and Border Protection Service (ACBPS) as Deputy CEO in 2015. Upon ACBPs transition to the Australian Border Force (ABF) later in 2015 Outram became a Deputy Commissioner and served as Deputy Commissioner Support Group until his appointment as Commissioner.

==== Commissioner ====
Outram was appointed Commissioner of the Australian Border Force in May 2018 after his predecessor, Roman Quaedvlieg, had his appointment terminated by the Governor-General for a series of improprieties committed by the former Commissioner during his tenure. Outram had been serving as Acting Commissioner during the 10 months Quaedvlieg had been on indefinite leave as the Australian Commission for Law Enforcement Integrity investigated the allegations of improper conduct. Upon being appointed to as Commissioner, Outram made clear his intention ensure the integrity of the ABF and committed to a series of organisational changes and a focus on using intelligence. Outram also committed the agency to tackle illegal tobacco, human trafficking, and slavery. Outram's appointment was supported by Quaedvlieg.

In 2020 at the height of the COVID-19 pandemic ABF was accused of allowing infected passengers of the Ruby Princess Cruise Ship to enter Australia without Quanunteeing due to misreading flu tests, leading to more than 660 infections and more than 21 deaths. This was disputed by ABF and Outram, with Outram clarifying that ABF did not possess the power to prevent the entry of passengers for human health reasons, instead placing the responsibility on the New South Wales Department of Health. Outram's position was later vindicated by a NSW Special Inquiry which found that NSW Health was mostly to blame for the bungle.

Outram was included in sanctions issued by Russia in response to Australia's own sanctions against Russian and Russian citizens due to the 2022 Russian invasion of Ukraine.

Outram officially retired as commissioner on 9 November 2024.

== Honours ==
Honours and awards	Date awarded	Citation
Australian Police Medal (APM)	2014	

Police appointments
Preceded by Roman Quaedvlieg	Comptroller-General of Customs; 2018–2024	Succeeded by Gavan Reynolds
Preceded by Roman Quaedvlieg	Commissioner of the Australian Border Force; 2018–2024	Succeeded by Gavan Reynolds
