= Gordon Jackson =

Gordon Jackson may refer to:

- Gordon Jackson (actor) (1923–1990), Scottish actor
- Gordon Jackson (businessman) (1924–1991), Australian businessman
- Gordon Jackson (advocate) (born 1948), Scottish advocate and member of the Scottish Parliament
