= Department of Industry and Commerce (1982–1984) =

Australian government department, 1982–1984

Department overview
- Formed: 7 May 1982
- Preceding Department: Department of Industry and Commerce (I) Department of Business and Consumer Affairs Department of Housing and Construction (II)
- Dissolved: 13 December 1984
- Superseding Department: Department of Industry, Technology and Commerce Department of Local Government and Administrative Services
- Jurisdiction: Commonwealth of Australia
- Headquarters: Barton, Canberra
- Ministers responsible: Phillip Lynch, Minister (1982); Andrew Peacock, Minister (1982–1983); John Button, Minister (1983–1984)
- Department executive: Tom Hayes, Secretary and Comptroller-General

The Department of Industry and Commerce was an Australian government department that existed between May 1982 and December 1984. It was the second so-named Australian government department.

== Scope ==
Information about the department's functions and government funding allocation could be found in the Administrative Arrangements Orders, the annual Portfolio Budget Statements and in the Department's annual reports.

At its creation, the Department dealt with:

- manufacturing and tertiary industries
- adjustment assistance to industry
- small business
- shipbuilding

== Structure ==
The Department was an Australian Public Service department, staffed by officials who were responsible to the Minister for Industry and Commerce.
