= Australian Customs Detector Dog Program =

Australian Customs Service breeds and trains Labradors to detect illegal drugs, firearms, explosives and hazardous chemical precursors associated with the manufacture or deployment of chemical weapons. Each year these dogs are responsible for hundreds of detections.

Detector dog teams operate nationwide and search sea and air cargo, aircraft baggage, international mail, ships, buildings and people.

The Customs Detector Dog Training Centre in Canberra trains narcotic, firearms and explosives detector dog teams for Australian Customs and a range of federal, state and territory agencies including police, military and corrective services. The centre also provides training to law enforcement agencies from China, Indonesia, Malaysia, Samoa, Guam and Saipan.

The Customs National Breeding and Development Centre in Melbourne supplies suitable Labrador Retrievers not only to Customs but to Australian federal, state and territory agencies, and countries including the United States of America, Indonesia, China, Japan, New Zealand, Guam, Papua New Guinea and Thailand.

== History ==
In 1969, the Australian Customs Service had only two detector dogs. Dogs were sourced from animal shelters, dog pounds and people with unwanted pets. From these early beginnings the program continued to grow throughout the 1970s and 1980s.

By the early 1990s, the growth in the Detector Dog Program had led to difficulties in sourcing sufficient quality dogs to supply the program. The solution was the development of the Customs detector dog breeding program to produce a reliable, high quality supply of dogs. This development included research by Mr John Vanderloo, into the best dog breed to meet the requirements of Customs across a range of criteria, with the Labrador breed being selected for their focus, versatility, temperament, and strong hunt and retrieve drives.

An intensive three-year study, conducted in conjunction with the University of Melbourne and the Royal Guide Dogs Associations of Australia at the Customs National Breeding and Development Centre, identified the required genetics for breeding and the best environmental influences for development of detector dogs. In early 1993 a three-year pilot-breeding program commenced using Labradors purchased from the Royal Guide Dog Association of Australia and leading Labrador breeders.

This breeding program is now the only source for Australian Customs detector dogs and is one of only a handful of specialized Detector Dog Breeding Programs in the world. Today, many other agencies use dogs bred by Customs. Customs bred dogs have been deployed in a variety of fields including arson detection, food detection or explosives/firearms detection. Australian Drug Detector Dogs have been provided to various nations under Regional Assistance Programs managed by AusAID (the Australian Federal Government Overseas Aid Agency).

Since 1993, Australian Customs has bred more than 1,000 puppies, most of which have been successfully deployed throughout Australia and overseas as operational detector dogs.
