= Gavan Reynolds =

Australian army officer

Lieutenant General Gavan Reynolds AO

3rd Commissioner of the Australian Border Force
- Incumbent
- Assumed office 10 November 2024
- Preceded by: Michael Outram

Comptroller-General of Customs
- Incumbent
- Assumed office 10 November 2024
- Preceded by: Michael Outram

Military service
- Allegiance: Australia
- Branch/service: Australian Army
- Years of service: 1985–2024
- Rank: Lieutenant General
- Commands: Chief of Defence Intelligence (2020–24); Head Military Strategic Plans (2019–20); 6th Combat Support Brigade (2013–15); 1st Intelligence Battalion (2004–05)
- Battles/wars: Gulf War; Iraq War; War in Afghanistan
- Awards: Officer of the Order of Australia; Meritorious Service Medal (United States)

Lieutenant General Gavan John Reynolds, AO is a retired senior officer in the Australian Army who is the Commissioner of the Australian Border Force since 2024. He joined the army via the Royal Military College, Duntroon in 1985 and has spent much of his career in military intelligence. He has commanded the 1st Intelligence Battalion (2004–05) and the 6th Combat Support Brigade (2013–15), and deployed on operations to the Persian Gulf, Lebanon and Syria, Iraq, and Afghanistan. He served as Head Military Strategic Plans from 2019 to 2020, before being appointed as the inaugural Chief of Defence Intelligence in July 2020.

== Military career ==
Reynolds entered the Royal Military College, Duntroon as an Australian Army officer cadet in July 1985. Following graduation in 1987, Reynolds was appointed a troop commander in the 16th Air Defence Regiment, Royal Australian Artillery. During the Gulf War, he deployed to the Persian Gulf in command of an RBS 70 detachment aboard HMAS Success. He subsequently served as aide-de-camp to the Chief of Army, S2 (intelligence officer) in the 3rd Brigade, an analyst in the Defence Intelligence Organisation, a tactics instructor at the Land Warfare Centre in Canungra, Queensland, and deployed to Syria and Lebanon as a military observer with the United Nations Truce Supervision Organization.

Reynolds commanded the 1st Intelligence Battalion from 2004 to 2005 and, following promotion to colonel in 2007, deployed as J2 in the Australian Joint Task Force in Iraq. Following his return to Australia, Reynolds served as Director of Officer Career Management – Army and later as Commander Career Management – Army. In recognition of his "exceptional service" to intelligence and career management in these roles, Reynolds was appointed a Member of the Order of Australia in the 2010 Queen's Birthday Honours.

Reynolds attended the Centre for Defence and Strategic Studies in 2010 and, in September, was promoted brigadier and deployed to Afghanistan with the Headquarters International Security Assistance Force. He returned to Australia as Director General Personnel – Army from June 2011 to December 2012, before attending the Higher Command and Staff Course at the Joint Services Command and Staff College in the United Kingdom in 2013. Reynolds commanded the 6th Combat Support Brigade from September 2013 to October 2015 and, on promotion to major general, was appointed the Australian Military Representative to NATO and the EU from 2016 to 2018. He was next appointed Head Military Strategic Plans in the Vice Chief of Defence Force Group from January 2019.

In June 2020 the Minister for Defence, Senator Linda Reynolds, announced the creation of the Defence Intelligence Group (DIG) to unify and provide greater coordination to intelligence capabilities in the Australian Defence Force. The DIG includes oversight for the Defence Intelligence Organisation and the Australian Geospatial-Intelligence Organisation. Reynolds was promoted lieutenant general and appointed the inaugural Chief of Defence Intelligence, responsible for the DIG, in July 2020.

Reynolds was advanced to Officer of the Order of Australia in the 2022 Queen's Birthday Honours in recognition of his "exceptional leadership in successive significant appointments"; namely as Australian Military Representative to NATO, Head Military Strategic Plans, and Chief of Defence Intelligence.

== Post-military career ==
On 10 November 2024, Reynolds was sworn in as the third Commissioner of the Australian Border Force, taking over from Michael Outram.

== Personal life ==
Reynolds is married and has two children. He holds a Bachelor of Arts in Geography with Honours, a Master of Defence Studies, and a Master of Business Administration.
