= Tim Besley (public servant) =

Australian public servant and businessman

Tim Besley AC

Secretary of the Department of Business & Consumer Affairs
- In office 8 November 1976 – 14 March 1982
- Preceded by: Alan Carmody
- Succeeded by: Tom Hayes

Chancellor of Macquarie University
- In office 1994–2001
- Preceded by: Michael Kirby
- Succeeded by: Maurice Newman

Personal details
- Born: Morrish Alexander Besley; 14 March 1927 (age 99) New Plymouth, New Zealand
- Education: University of Auckland; Macquarie University
- Occupation: Public servant, businessman, engineer

Morrish Alexander "Tim" Besley AC (born 14 March 1927) is an Australian engineer, businessman and former senior public servant. He was Chairman of the Commonwealth Bank between 1988 and 1999, and oversaw the company's privatisation.

== Life and career ==
In 1950, Besley migrated to Australia from New Zealand for work as a Civil Engineer on the Snowy Mountains Scheme.

Besley joined the Commonwealth Public Service in 1967, soon moving into the Department of External Territories. Between 1973 and 1976 he was employed in the Treasury Department, before being appointed to head the Department of Business & Consumer Affairs in 1976. During his Secretary appointment he commenced a law degree at Macquarie University.

Between 1988 and 1999, Besley was Chairman of the Commonwealth Bank board, overseeing the privatisation of the bank. From 1990 to 2001 he was Chairman of Leighton Holdings. Besley served as the Chancellor of Macquarie University between 1994 and 2001.

In 2000, Besley was appointed the Chairman of an Independent Inquiry into Telecommunications Services. The inquiry found services generally satisfactory, but identified that progress needed to be made in rural and remote areas before privatisation of Telstra could be considered.

== Awards ==
Besley was awarded a Centenary Medal in 2001 for service to Australian society in civil engineering and corporate governance. He was appointed a Companion of the Order of Australia in January 2002 for service to the community through the promotion of economic and social development, the advancement of science, innovation and education, and for distinction at the forefront of government and corporate responsibilities.

Government offices
Preceded by Alan Carmody	Secretary of the Department of Business & Consumer Affairs; 1976 – 1982	Succeeded by Tom Hayes
Business positions
Preceded by Sir Brian Massy-Greene	Chairman of the Commonwealth Bank; 1988 – 1999	Succeeded by John Ralph
Preceded by Stewart Wallis	Chairman of Leighton Holdings; 1990 – 2001	Succeeded by John Morschel
Academic offices
Preceded by Michael Kirby	Chancellor of Macquarie University; 1994 – 2001	Succeeded by Maurice Newman
