= Alf Rattigan =

Australian public servant (1911–2000)

Alf Rattigan CBE AO

Secretary of the Department of Customs and Excise
- In office 25 July 1960 – 15 May 1963

Personal details
- Born: Godfrey Alfred Rattigan; 16 November 1911 Kalgoorlie, Western Australia
- Died: 29 February 2000 (aged 88) Canberra, Australian Capital Territory
- Spouse(s): Winifred (née Odgers) (m. 1940–2000; his death)
- Occupation: Public servant

Godfrey Alfred Rattigan CBE AO (16 November 1911 – 29 February 2000) was a senior Australian Public Service official and policymaker.

== Life and career ==
Alf Rattigan was born in Kalgoorlie, Western Australia on 16 November 1911. In 1925 he joined the Royal Australian Navy as a 13-year-old cadet Midshipman at Jervis Bay.

Between July 1960 and May 1963, he was Comptroller General of Customs and Permanent Head of the Department of Customs and Excise.

Alf Rattigan was appointed to chair the Tariff Board in 1963 and was subsequently the first chairman of the Industries Assistance Commission when it replaced the Tariff Board in 1974.

His book Industry Assistance:The Inside Story, published in 1986, provided an account of the struggle against protectionism in Australia during the 1960s and early 1970s. It described the extent of entrenched opposition, by private interest groups and within government and bureaucracy, to policy transparency and to economic reform.

His commitment to reform was not the product of economic rectitude. He believed that rational—that is, nationally rewarding—economic policies are the means by which we can produce the additional wealth needed to achieve our social goals. He reasoned that the national wealth available to service those goals sets the limit on our ability to provide better education and improved health care, and argued that any compromise on economic reform lowers that limit.

The Tariff Board, which preceded the Industries Assistance Commission, was established as an independent statutory body, charged with recommending assistance to ‘economic and efficient’ industries. It was required to hold public hearings on the matters referred to it by governments and to provide its advice to governments in public reports. Until the mid-sixties its recommendations reflected the established ‘needs-based’ approach—that is, the level of protection needed to enable each industry to compete against international competition. Although its statute required it to report on ‘the operation of the Tariff and the development of industries’, its annual reports offered little insight into the economic consequences of the protection it recommended, and were generally limited to a description of those recommendations.

In the mid-sixties, following a wide-ranging review of economic policy commissioned by the then Australian government, the Board began to consider how the Board should respond to the quite limited policy guidance provided in its statute. Rattigan was aware of the adverse economic consequences of the established ‘needs-based’ approach to protection. In 1967 he outlined a new approach, developed to ensure that the Board's recommendations were consistent with the settled goals of national economic policy. This included a systematic public review of the structure and levels of protection, focusing on industries with high levels of protection, rather than the past focus on particular industries or products. It nominated levels of protection that indicated low, medium and high-cost production (using ‘effective rate’, a measure of the protection accorded a process or industry rather than their outputs, developed by Professor Max Corden). The Board foreshadowed its intention to use the effective rate concept (measuring the net protection accorded an industry as a result of the opposite effects of protection on its inputs and outputs) in deciding which industries were highly protected and thus most in need of review. It also identified improvements needed in the policy information system supporting its work. Rattigan introduced these improvements, important in reporting on the economy-wide effects of protection, in the early life of the Industries Assistance Commission.

These changes were in stark contrast to the established approach to protection, an approach to which both the Department of Trade and its Minister were strongly committed. The tension that developed between the Minister and Rattigan, and within Cabinet between Trade Ministers on the one hand and Treasurers on the other, stimulated intense public interest and discussion about the roles of advice and decision-making on protection. The Minister and department regarded the changes proposed by Rattigan as a matter of policy, beyond the authority of the advisory body. Rattigan saw it as exercising his statutory responsibility for making transparent the criteria used in formulating recommendations. The resulting tension was inevitable and became very public. Rattigan was at one point warned by the Minister against providing a public explanation of the proposed changes on the grounds that he would be in breach of his authority in expressing a view that may not be consistent with government policy.

In a policy environment catering for special interest groups, the commission's charter and procedures were designed to reflect the logic underlying market economics and democracy. The logic behind market economics assumes the existence of well-informed consumers, and the logic behind democracy assumes a well-informed community. That was the rationale for establishing the commission, structured to operate outside government and independent of private interest groups.

Rattigan's contribution to public policy was not limited to protection reform. As Professor Max Corden has pointed out, the Industries Assistance Commission under Alf Rattigan sponsored the introduction of general equilibrium modelling in Australia.

Early in the life of the commission, the Australian Bureau of Statistics completed the integration of official data systems. This meant that it was possible to relate data on the structure of the economy to other official data collected. Rattigan sponsored the development, under Professor Alan Powel's leadership, of an analytical framework that equipped the commission to assess the economy-wide effects of changes in protection.

The resulting framework, or its offshoots, is now used routinely by federal and state governments as an aid in understanding the likely consequences of other policy changes under consideration. This has introduced greater discipline and public accountability into policy decision-making.

Rattigan died in Canberra on 29 February 2000 after a battle with prostate cancer.

== Awards and honours ==
Rattigan was made an Officer of the Order of the British Empire in January 1960 when he was a Deputy Secretary at the Department of Trade. In January 1964, while Chairman of the Tariff Board, he was appointed a Commander of the Order of the British Empire.

In January 1992 Rattigan was made an Officer of the Order of Australia for his contributions to public service.

In 2012, a street in the Canberra suburb of Casey was named Rattigan Street in Alf Rattigan's honour.

Government offices
Preceded by Frank Meere	Secretary of the Department of Customs and Excise; 1960 – 1963	Succeeded by Francis Jeremiah Harrison
