= Malcolm McIntosh (public servant) =

Australian public servant and scientist (1945–2000)

Sir Malcolm McIntosh AC FTSE

Secretary of the Department of Industry, Technology and Commerce
- In office 1 July 1990 – 22 December 1990

Chief of Defence Procurement in the Ministry of Defence, United Kingdom
- In office January 1991 – January 1996

Chief Executive of the CSIRO
- In office 5 February 1996 – 7 February 2000
- Preceded by: Roy Green
- Succeeded by: Colin Adam

Personal details
- Born: Malcolm Kenneth McIntosh; 14 December 1945 Melbourne, Victoria, Australia
- Died: 7 February 2000 (aged 54) Melbourne, Victoria, Australia
- Education: Australian National University
- Occupation: Public servant

Sir Malcolm Kenneth McIntosh AC FTSE (14 December 1945 – 7 February 2000) was an Australian scientist and senior public servant.

== Life and career ==
Malcolm McIntosh was born in Melbourne on 14 December 1945. He attended Telopea Park School in Canberra, and then studied physics at both undergraduate and doctorate level at the Australian National University.

After graduation from the ANU McIntosh was employed between 1970 and 1972 at the Weapons Research Establishment in Salisbury, South Australia. From 1972 to 1974 he completed 2 years National Service in the Australian Army during which he attained the rank of Major. He then joined the Department of Defence.

In 1990, McIntosh was appointed Secretary of the Department of Industry, Technology and Commerce.

In 1991, he was recruited by the British Ministry of Defence to the position of Chief of Defence Procurement. He received a knighthood for public service at the end of this term in January 1996. He also received the United States Department of Defence Medal for his work during this period.

Between 1996 and 2000, McIntosh was the head of the Commonwealth Scientific and Industrial Research Organisation (CSIRO).

McIntosh died in Melbourne on 7 February 2000, after acquiring an infection whilst suffering from cancer.

== Awards ==
McIntosh was appointed a Companion of the Order of Australia (AC) in January 1999 for service to excellence in scientific and technological research, to providing new opportunities for industries, and to Australian Defence industry and science policy. He had already been awarded a British knighthood and a US Department of Defense Medal for Distinguished Public Service.

Malcolm McIntosh's work is now commemorated in the Malcolm McIntosh Prize for Physical Scientist of the Year. His life and legacy is honoured every year at the annual Malcolm McIntosh Lecture.

Government offices
Preceded by David Charles	Secretary of the Department of Industry, Technology and Commerce; 1990	Succeeded by Neville Stevens
Preceded by Roy Montague Green	Chief Executive of the Commonwealth Scientific and Industrial Research Organisation; 1996 – 2000	Succeeded by Colin Adam
