= David Charles (public servant) =

Australian public servant

Doctor David Charles

Secretary of the Department of Industry, Technology and Commerce
- In office 13 March 1985 – 30 June 1990

Personal details
- Education: Monash University; University of London
- Occupation: Public servant

Doctor David Charles is a former senior Australian public servant and policymaker. He is best known for his time as Secretary of the Department of Industry, Technology and Commerce. He is currently a consultant at Insight Economics Pty Ltd.

== Life and career ==
David Charles was born in the 1940s. He was educated at Monash University, graduating from a bachelor of economics degree with first class honours. He went on to gain his doctorate in economics from London University.

He joined the Australian Public Service in the Tariff Board in 1972. Between 1973 and 1979 he worked in protection policy in various departments including the Department of the Prime Minister and Cabinet, the Department of the Special Minister of State and the Department of Business and Consumer Affairs. In July 1979 he became head of the communications division in the Department of the Prime Minister and Cabinet. In 1982 he joined the Department of Industrial Relations as a deputy secretary.

From March 1985, he was Secretary of the Department of Industry, Technology and Commerce. He left his post on 1 July 1990 to take up appointment as Consul-General in Berlin. At the time he left the department, he sparked controversy when he publicly criticised the economic policy of the government of the day. Prime Minister Bob Hawke told media that if public servants were allowed to make public criticism of policy, the government's position would become "untenable". Hawke issued a press release at the time to reprimand Charles, stating that he had seriously considered revoking Charles' appointment as Consul-General in Berlin. The Canberra Times offered a different opinion to Hawke, stating "it would be unfortunate if this episode had the effect of making senior public servants reluctant to give interviews in their areas of expertise."

Charles left the public service after returning from Berlin, co-founding the Allen Consulting Group in Melbourne.

Charles is currently a director at Insight Economics Pty Ltd.

Government offices
Preceded by Tom Hayes	Secretary of the Department of Industry, Technology and Commerce; 1985 – 1990	Succeeded by Malcolm McIntosh
