= Frank Meere =

Australian public servant

Sir Frank Meere CBE OBE

Comptroller-General of the Department of Trade and Customs
- In office 1952 – 11 January 1956

Comptroller-General of the Department of Customs and Excise
- In office 11 January 1956 – 22 July 1960

Personal details
- Born: Francis Anthony Meere; 24 July 1895 Daylesford, Victoria
- Died: 15 April 1985 (aged 89) Canberra, Australian Capital Territory
- Occupation: Public servant

Sir Francis Anthony Meere (24 July 1895 – 15 April 1985) was a senior Australian public servant. He was Comptroller-General of Customs between 1952 and 1960, heading first the Department of Trade and Customs and then the Department of Customs and Excise.

== Life and career ==
Meere was born in Daylesford, Victoria on 24 July 1895. He was educated at the Christian Brothers College, St Kilda.

Meere joined the Commonwealth Public Service in 1913 in Victoria in the Department of Trade and Customs. Between 1947 and 1952, Meeres was assistant Comptroller-General of Customs in the department. He was promoted to Comptroller-General of Customs in 1952.

Meere retired from his Customs position in July 1960, and soon after was appointed a director of Pope Industries Limited, a manufacturing business.

Meere's first wife, Lady Helena Agnes Meere, died in December 1961.

Meere died on 15 April 1985, and a Requiem Mass was held for him at St Christopher's Cathedral in Manuka, Canberra.

== Awards ==
Meere was appointed an Officer of the Order of the British Empire for his public service in June 1952. He was promoted to a Commander of the Order in 1955.

In June 1960, Meere was made a Knight Bachelor.

Government offices
Preceded by Bill Turner	Comptroller-General of the Department of Trade and Customs; 1952 – 1956	Succeeded by Himself as Comptroller-General of the Department of Customs and Excise
Preceded by Himself as Comptroller General of the Department of Trade and Customs	Comptroller-General of the Department of Customs and Excise; 1956 – 1960	Succeeded by Alf Rattigan
