= Australian Customs and Border Protection Service =

Australian government body (2009–2015)

- Australian Customs Flag

Agency overview
- Formed: 22 May 2009
- Preceding Agency: Australian Customs Service
- Dissolved: 1 July 2015
- Superseding Agency: Australian Border Force
- Type: Statutory authority
- Jurisdiction: Government of Australia
- Headquarters: Customs House Canberra; 35°17′1″S 149°7′55″E
- Employees: 5,424 (at June 2014)
- Annual budget: A$1.09 billion (2011)
- Parent Agency: Department of Immigration and Border Protection (2013–2015); Attorney-General's Department (2009–2013)

The Australian Customs and Border Protection Service was an Australian federal government agency responsible for managing the security and integrity of the Australian border and facilitating the movement of legitimate international travellers and goods, whilst protecting the safety, security and commercial interests of Australians. It was headquartered in Canberra and employed over 5,800 people around Australia and overseas.

The agency was under the jurisdiction of the Attorney-General's Department from 2009 to 2013, and then transferred to the newly formed Department of Immigration and Border Protection in 2013, until its transformation into the Australian Border Force in 2015.

The functions of the agency are now delivered by the Department of Home Affairs and Australian Border Force.

== Agency role ==
The Service defined its role as follows: “Our role is complex and diverse and requires a very considered and increasingly targeted approach to conducting our business. If we do not manage our responsibilities effectively, the potential impacts… may negatively affect the Australian community, international travellers and trade relations both here and overseas”

The Service was Australia's predominant border control agency. From international travellers at airports, to overseas mail and trade brought in by sea, it was responsible for the continued safety and security of the people and goods that travel across Australia's borders.

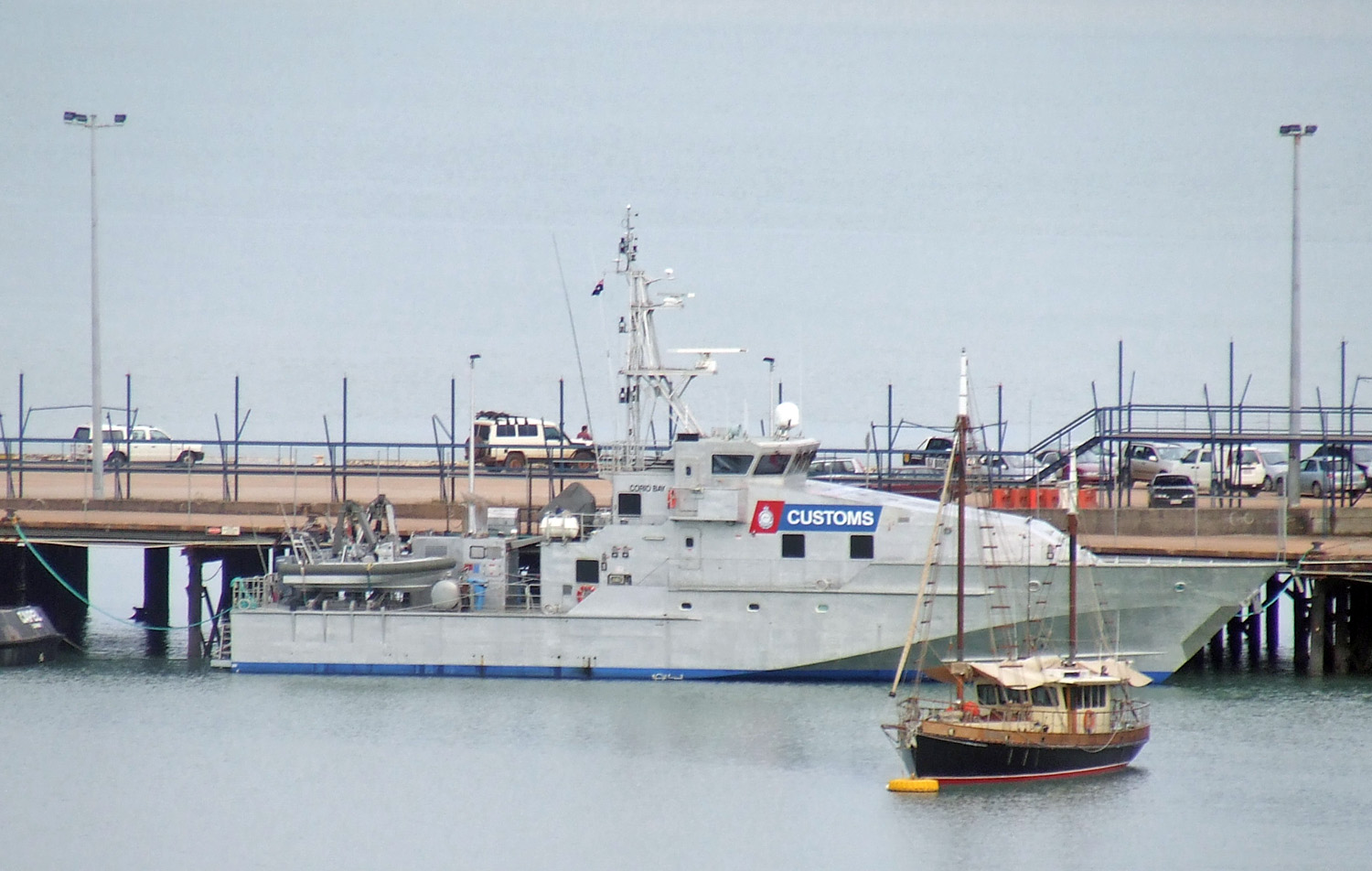
An Offshore Patrol Vessel of the Customs Marine Unit docked in Darwin, Northern Territory

In conjunction with the Australian Defence Force, the Service facilitated Australia's response to the detection and rescue of 'suspected irregular entry vessels' that smuggled people from South-East Asia into Australian waters. The agency was also responsible for the discovery and apprehension of 'illegal foreign fishing vessels', the patrol of remote Australian and international waters, and aerial surveillance of Australia's coastline. To achieve these functions, the Service operated its own air and sea patrol unit, the Customs Marine Unit.

The Service used an intelligence-led, risk-based approach to managing threats, focussing on specific targets that may pose a risk to the border. This allowed the agency to plan coordinated responses, interventions and strategies with various other government agencies, including; Australian Crime Commission, Australian Federal Police, Attorney-General's Department, Department of Agriculture, Fisheries and Forestry, Department of Defence, Department of Foreign Affairs and Trade, Department of Immigration and Border Protection and the Office of Transport Security.

=== Import and export control ===
Customs controlled the import and export of goods to and from Australia, in particular the control of prohibited or restricted items, and the interception of illegal and potentially harmful goods such as drugs, weapons and computer games. Techniques used to target high-risk aircraft, vessels, cargo, postal items and travellers included using intelligence, computer-based profiling and analysis, detector dogs, Smartgate, container X-ray facilities, closed-circuit television (CCTV) monitoring and other means.

Customs officers at air and sea ports, in addition to performing basic immigration control (see below), assessed passengers arrival and departure cards, and had the authority to scan and search passenger baggage. Quarantine risk material could be referred to Australian Quarantine and Inspection Service officers.

Goods arriving from overseas by post were cleared by Customs and AQIS officers before being released to Australia Post for delivery.

Customs collected goods and services tax (GST) on taxable goods imported into Australia.

Customs administered the Tourist Refund Scheme (TRS) for tourists visiting Australia temporarily or Australian residents leaving the country, allowing them, under certain conditions, to claim a refund of the GST or Wine equalisation tax on items purchased in Australia.

=== People smuggling ===
The Service was the lead agency in the Australian government's response to people-smuggling and often performed activities on behalf of other agencies including:

- Monitoring Australian waters for potential people smuggling vessels
- Intercepting boats carrying immigrants without valid visas with Bay Class vessels
- Transporting people found in vessels to Australian territory for immigration and quarantine assessment
- Coordinating education and awareness campaigns overseas to deter people-smuggling activities

=== Terrorism ===
The Service operated under the 'National Counter-Terrorism Plan', which was a plan intended to mitigate any risk of terrorism in Australia. The Service worked in conjunction with other Australian Government departments to screen and target any potential threats moving across the border, including:

- Air and sea passengers
- Cargo (sea, air and mail)
- Maritime surveillance
- Remote area patrols

=== Illegal entry ===
The Service was responsible for processing all travellers entering and leaving the country. At the border, Service officers would check all passengers to ensure compliance with customs, immigration and quarantine requirements. The Service's purpose was to stop people without correct documentation or visas from entering the country.

=== Controlled substances ===
One of the largest areas of work undertaken by the Service was in relation to the importation of narcotics and precursor substances and the smuggling of illegal amounts of tobacco. Examination techniques such as x-ray, trace detection technology and detector dogs were used to screen people, goods, mail, vessels and aircraft moving across Australia's border.

=== Prohibited material ===
Australian law prohibits the importing of any material of an offensive, grotesque or otherwise objectionable nature. The Service worked to prevent the importation of material that was either refused classification by the Australian Classification Board, or was unclassified but would likely be refused classification by the Australian Classification Board. This included material in electronic form such as CDs or DVDs, computer hard drives and within electronic games. Prohibited material included, but was not limited to:

- Child pornography
- Offensive or sexualised violence
- Criminal or terrorist material
- Drug use
- Fetish material

=== Illegal foreign fishing ===
The Service was the lead agency coordinating regular patrol (both aerial surveillance and on-water) of Australia's 'Exclusive Economic Zone' to detect and deter any foreign fishing vessels. Along with dedicated in-country education programs designed to deter people from undertaking illegal fishing, the Service's work saw a continual decline in the rates of foreign fishing vessels entering the EEZ.

== History ==
=== Establishment ===
The Australian Customs and Border Protection Service had its origins in the Department of Trade and Customs, established at federation in 1901. The organisation was restructured several times since, including becoming the Department of Customs and Excise in 1958 and then briefly the Department of Police and Customs in 1975. Later that same year, the Bureau of Customs was established, which remained the Australian Government's customs agency until 1985 when the Australian Customs Service was established.

In December 2008 then Prime Minister Kevin Rudd announced that the Australian Government would be augmenting, re-tasking and renaming the Australian Customs Service to create the new Australian Customs and Border Protection Service. Royal Assent was given to the changes on 22 May 2009 and the Australian Customs and Border Protection Service was established.

=== Australian Border Force ===
In 2015, the Australian Government announced changes to the Immigration and Border Protection portfolio in relation to future border protection arrangements. From 1 July 2015, the Department of Immigration and Border Protection and the Australian Customs and Border Protection Service were consolidated into a single Department of Immigration and Border Protection. At this time, the Australian Border Force, a single frontline operational border agency, was established within the department. The Australian Border Force draws together the operational border, investigations, compliance, detention and enforcement functions of the two former agencies, as well as policy, regulatory and corporate functions. (Note: For more information about the changes, read the Minister for Immigration and Border Protection's speech announcing the new arrangements on 9 May 2014 and the Australian Border Force booklet.)

== Agency statistics ==
When it existed, each week the Service would:

=== Clear ===
- 268,000 air passengers arriving in Australia
- 1,620 international flights
- 260 ships arriving in Australian ports from overseas
- 14 overseas smallcraft
- 24,600 export entries
- 268,700 air way bills
- 48,500 sea cargo manifest lines

=== Patrol ===
- Three million square nautical miles including:
  - Australia's coastline and seas, including the Southern Ocean and Northern waters
  - airports
  - sea ports
  - mail centres

=== Inspect ===
- 2000 sea cargo containers
- 29,500 air cargo consignments
- 776,000 letters
- 405,500 parcels from overseas

=== Collect ===
- $188 million in revenue from various sources, for Customs and Border Protection and on behalf of other agencies

== See also ==
- Australian Border Force
- Australian Quarantine and Inspection Service
- Fences and Border Protection: The Question of Establishing Technical Barriers in Europe

== Notes ==
Footnotes

Citations

=== Works cited ===
- Australian Customs and Border Protection Service (November 2011), Australian Customs and Border Protection Service Annual Report 2010–11 (PDF), Australian Customs and Border Protection Service, archived (PDF) from the original on 15 May 2013
- Bannon, Matthew (2007), "The evolution of the role of Australian customs in maritime surveillance and border protection", University of Wollongong Thesis Collection 1954-2016, University of Wollongong, archived from the original on 25 April 2012
