= Lionel Woodward =

Lionel Woodward AO

Secretary of the Department of Veterans' Affairs
- In office 1 March 1989 – 26 April 1994

Chief Executive Officer of the Australian Customs Service
- In office 1994–2005

Personal details
- Born: 9 October 1942 (age 83) Sydney
- Education: Australian National University
- Occupation: Public servant

Lionel Barrie Woodward, AO (born 9 October 1942) is a retired senior Australian public servant.

== Life and career ==
Woodward was born in Sydney on 9 October 1942.

In 1982, Woodward was appointed a Deputy Secretary in the Department of Immigration and Ethnic Affairs, where he remained until 1985. From 1985 to 1989, Woodward was a Deputy Secretary in the Department of Defence. Between March 1989 and April 1994, Woodward was the Secretary of the Department of Veterans' Affairs.

Woodward was the Chief Executive Director of the Australian Customs Service for over a decade, between 1994 and 2005.

== Awards ==
Woodward was made an Officer of the Order of Australia in January 1995. In 2001, he was awarded the Centenary Medal for service as Comptroller General and later Chief Executive Officer, Australian Customs Service.

Government offices
Preceded by Noel Tanzer	Secretary of the Department of Veterans' Affairs; 1989–1994	Succeeded by Allan Hawke
Preceded by Frank Kelly	Chief Executive Officer of the Australian Customs Service; 1994–2005	Succeeded by Michael Carmody
