= Alan Carmody =

Australian public servant and government official

Sir Alan Carmody CBE

Secretary of the Department of Customs and Excise
- In office 12 May 1966 – 27 March 1975

Secretary of the Department of Police and Customs
- In office 27 March 1975 – 22 December 1975

Secretary of the Department of Business and Consumer Affairs
- In office 22 December 1975 – 11 August 1976

Secretary of the Department of the Prime Minister and Cabinet
- In office 1 October 1976 – 12 April 1978
- Preceded by: John Menadue
- Succeeded by: Sir Geoffrey Yeend

Personal details
- Born: Alan Thomas Carmody; 8 September 1920 Malvern, Victoria
- Died: 12 April 1978 (aged 57) Canberra, Australian Capital Territory
- Spouse: Elizabeth Mary Brennan
- Children: 3 sons, 2 daughters
- Education: Canberra University College; University of Melbourne
- Occupation: Public servant

Sir Alan Thomas Carmody CBE (8 September 1920 – 12 April 1978) was an Australian public servant and government official, who was knighted for his contributions.

== Background and early career ==
Carmody was born at Malvern, a suburb of Melbourne, in Victoria. His father, Thomas Carmody, worked as a telephone mechanic for the Postmaster-General's Department and was later awarded the Meritorious Service Medal and Bar for bravery in World War I. Alan Carmody attended St Patrick's College, Goulburn, New South Wales. Aged 16, he joined the Commonwealth Public Service on 18 March 1937 as a clerk for the Department of Trade and Customs in Canberra.

Carmody enlisted in 1940 in the Citizen Air Force of the Royal Australian Air Force. He was commissioned in February 1943, serving as a radar officer and was demobilised in 1945. He studied at the Canberra University College and graduated from the University of Melbourne with degrees in arts (1946), commerce (1947) and a Masters of Commerce (1950).

== Public service career ==
During various stages of Carmody's career, he worked within the Department of Trade and Customs; the tariff board; the department of trade where he was deputy-secretary; the department of customs and excise as comptroller-general; the department of customs and excise (later Department of Police and Customs) as head; the Department of Business and Consumer Affairs as secretary and secretary of the Department of the Prime Minister and Cabinet.

In 1975, Carmody pushed for the establishment of an agency to be known as the Australia Police, which he would have headed initially, formed by combining the Australian Capital Territory, Northern Territory and Commonwealth police forces, roughly modelled on the Royal Canadian Mounted Police. The force would have dealt with smuggling and white-collar crime. The project never came to pass for political reasons.

== Awards and honours ==
In 1964, Carmody was appointed an Officer of the Order of the British Empire, that was upgraded to a Companion of the Order in 1971. In 1977, Carmody was appointed a Knight Bachelor in recognition of service to the public service.

In 2008, a street in the Canberra suburb of Casey was named Carmody Street in Alan Carmody's honour.

== Personal ==
A practising Catholic, Carmody married Elizabeth Mary Brennan in St Patrick's Catholic Church, Adelaide, on 25 October 1944. Together they had five children: two daughters and three sons. Carmody died suddenly from coronary vascular disease on 12 April 1978, aged 57, at his Canberra home, while still serving as Secretary of the Department of the Prime Minister and Cabinet. After a service at St Christopher's Cathedral, he was interred in Canberra.

Government offices
Preceded by Francis Jeremiah Harrison	Secretary of the Department of Customs and Excise; 1966–1975	Succeeded by Himself as Secretary of the Department of Police and Customs
Preceded by Himself as Secretary of the Department of Customs and Excise	Secretary of the Department of Police and Customs; 1975	Succeeded by Himself as Secretary of the Department of Business and Consumer Affairs
Preceded by Himself as Secretary of the Department of Customs and Excise	Secretary of the Department of Business and Consumer Affairs; 1975–1976	Succeeded by Tim Besley
Preceded by Hugh Ennor as Secretary of the Department of Science and Consumer Affairs	Secretary of the Department of Business and Consumer Affairs; 1975–1976	Succeeded by Tim Besley
Preceded by John Menadue	Secretary of the Department of the Prime Minister and Cabinet; 1976–1978	Succeeded by Geoffrey Yeend
