= ABFC Thaiyak =

Patrol vessel used by the Customs Marine Unit of the Australian Border Force

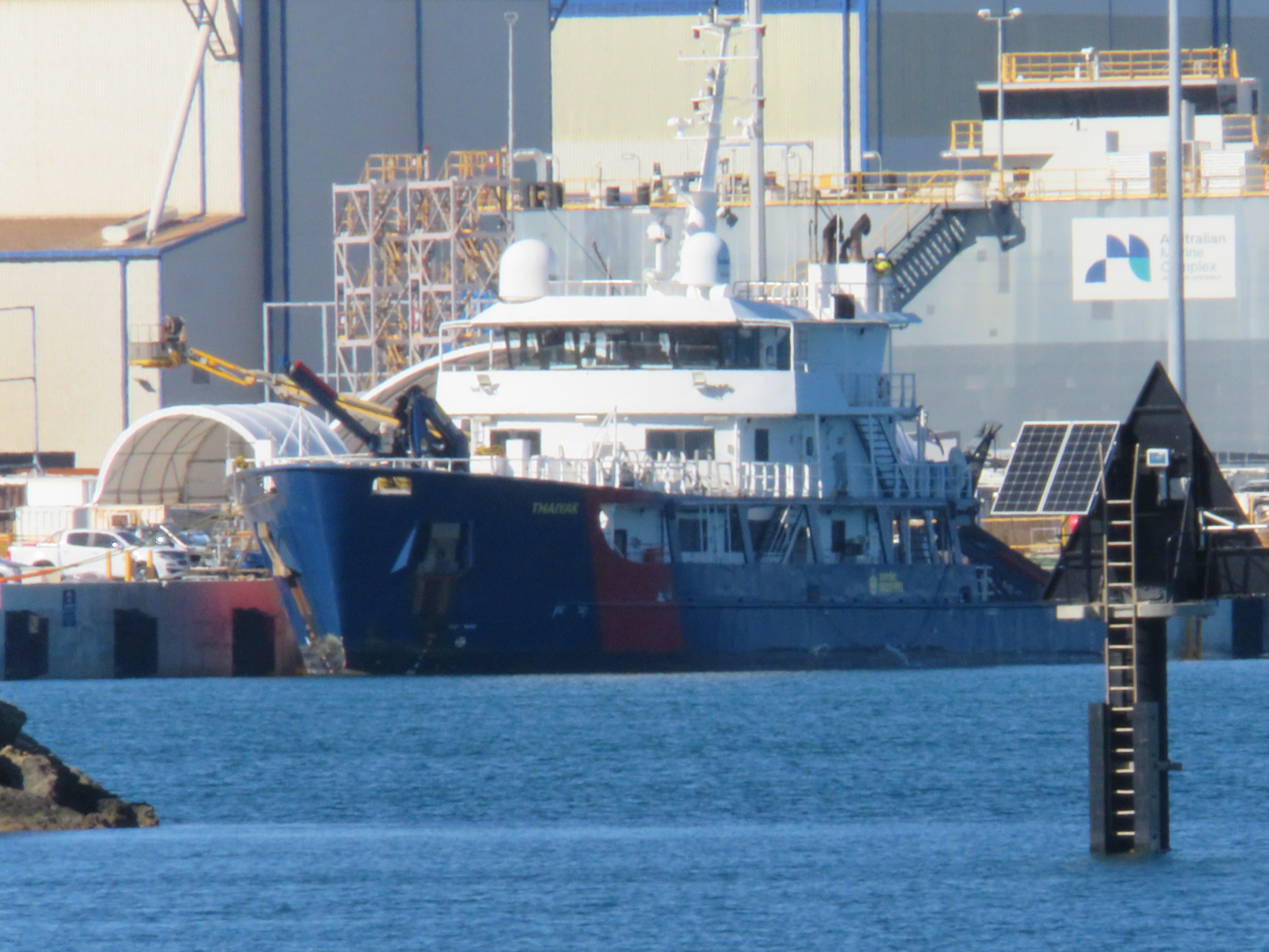
- ABFC Thaiyak in Henderson, Western Australia in May 2026

History

Australia
- Name: ABFC Thaiyak
- Operator: Australian Border Force
- Builder: Strategic Marine, Vung Tau, Vietnam
- Launched: March 2014
- Acquired: June 2014
- Commissioned: 20 June 2014
- In service: 23 June 2014
- Identification: MMSI number: 503004590; IMO number: 9692399; Call sign: VZBD

General characteristics
- Tonnage: 585 GT
- Length: 40 m (130 ft)
- Beam: 11.5 m (38 ft)
- Draught: 2.4 m (7.9 ft)
- Propulsion: 2 × Caterpillar C32 main engines, 970 kilowatts (1,300 hp)
- Speed: 12 knots (22 km/h)
- Range: 2,750 nautical miles (5,090 km; 3,160 mi) at 10 knots (19 km/h; 12 mph)
- Endurance: 120 days
- Complement: 13 crew plus 4 special operations personnel and 24 passengers.
- Notes: Carries 2 × 7.7 m (25 ft) NORSAFE 750 rigid hull inflatable boats

ABFC Thaiyak (pronounced “tie-yak”) is a patrol vessel used by the Customs Marine Unit of the Australian Border Force, primarily stationed at the Ashmore and Cartier Islands and is also known as the Long Term Ashmore Capability (LTAC) vessel. Its name, meaning spear, is based on suggestions from Torres Strait Islander crew members who had consulted with their elders.

== Construction ==
In 2013 Strategic Marine was awarded the contract to build the 40-metre on-station Long Term Ashmore Capability (LTAC) vessel for Gardline Australia Pty Ltd on behalf of the Government of Australia. The vessel was designed by MMD Naval Architects to provide border protection services in Australia's northern waters therefore to be reliable and flexibly self-sufficient for longterm deployment in tropical regions. The vessel employs a steel hull with aluminium superstructure.

It has medical facilities for first aid along with an isolation facility.

Austere accommodation is provided for up to 24 transportees. In addition, sheltered deck space allows for a short term holding capability for 25 additional passengers.

The vessel was constructed at the Strategic Marine shipyards in Vung Tau, Vietnam and was launched in March 2014.

== Operational history ==
The Minister for Immigration and Border Protection, Scott Morrison, attended a naming ceremony for the vessel at Victoria Quay in Fremantle Harbour on 20 June 2014. He said Thaiyak would significantly improve Australia's capability in the detection and response to maritime threats in Australia's northern waters.

The vessel is not armed but carries small arms consisting of Glock pistols for Australian Border Force boarding party officers along with other personal defence equipment on board.
