= Jim Cavanagh =

Australian politician

The Honourable Jim Cavanagh
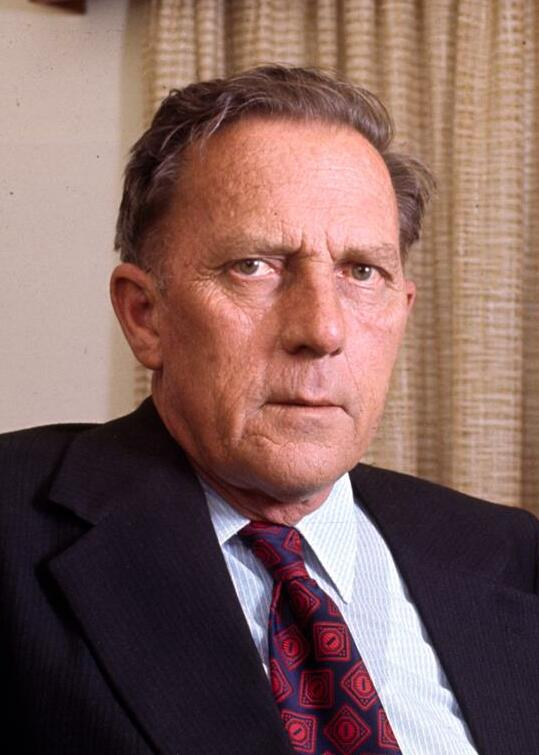
- Cavanagh in 1973

Minister for Police and Customs
- In office 6 June 1975 – 11 November 1975
- Prime Minister: Gough Whitlam
- Preceded by: Kep Enderby
- Succeeded by: Ivor Greenwood

Minister for Aboriginal Affairs
- In office 9 October 1973 – 6 June 1975
- Prime Minister: Gough Whitlam
- Preceded by: Gordon Bryant
- Succeeded by: Les Johnson

Minister for Works
- In office 19 December 1972 – 9 October 1973
- Prime Minister: Gough Whitlam
- Preceded by: Gough Whitlam
- Succeeded by: Les Johnson

Senator for South Australia
- In office 1 July 1962 – 30 June 1981
- Preceded by: Sid O'Flaherty
- Succeeded by: Dominic Foreman

Personal details
- Born: James Luke Cavanagh; 21 June 1913 Rosewater, South Australia
- Died: 19 August 1990 (aged 77) Woodville, South Australia
- Party: Labor
- Spouse: Elfrieda Lamm (m. 1941)
- Parent(s): James Luke Cavanagh and Isobella Cavanagh nee Buckton

James Luke Cavanagh (21 June 1913 – 19 August 1990) was an Australian trade unionist and politician. A member of the Australian Labor Party (ALP), he was a Senator for South Australia from 1962 to 1981 and held ministerial office in the Whitlam government as Minister for Works (1972–1973), Aboriginal Affairs (1973–1975), and Police and Customs (1975). Prior to entering parliament he was an influential union leader as secretary of the Plasterers' Society of South Australia from 1945 to 1962.

== Early life ==
Cavanagh was born on 21 June 1913 in Paddington, South Australia. He was the youngest of three children born to Isobella (née Buckton) and James Luke Cavanagh. His father, a boilermaker by profession, was politically active and served on the Port Adelaide City Council.

Cavanagh grew up in Adelaide's inner suburbs, attending St Catherine's Dominican School in North Adelaide and the Christian Brothers' School at Ovingham. He left school at the age of 14 and began working as a labourer, but struggled to find work during the Great Depression and was frequently unemployed. By the early 1930s he had joined his older brother in working as a plasterer.

== Labour movement ==
In 1945, Cavanagh was elected secretary of the Plasterers' Society of South Australia, a position he would hold until he entered the Senate in 1962. He later served as national president of the Operative Plasterers' and Plaster Workers' Federation of Australia from 1967 to 1971.

Cavanagh frequently appeared in the Industrial Court of South Australia and won a number of favourable award rulings for the plasterers. According to his biographer Malcolm Saunders, he turned the union into "possibly the most militant and tightly disciplined union in South Australia and in so doing made himself one of the most publicly visible trade union leaders in the state, feared, if not hated, by builders, but greatly respected in the trade union and labour movements".

== Politics ==
Cavanagh was elected to the Senate at the 1961 election. He was Minister for Works from 1972 to 1973, Minister for Aboriginal Affairs from 1973 to 1975 and Minister for Police and Customs in 1975. He did not stand for re-election at the 1980 election and retired from the Senate in June 1981.

== Personal life ==
In 1941, Cavanagh married Elfrieda Lamm, with whom he had three children. He died on 19 August 1990 in Woodville, South Australia, having been widowed several months earlier.

Political offices
Preceded by Gough Whitlam	Minister for Works; 1972–1973	Succeeded by Les Johnson
Preceded by Gordon Bryant	Minister for Aboriginal Affairs; 1973–1975	Succeeded by Les Johnson
Preceded by Kep Enderby	Minister for Police and Customs; 1975	Succeeded by Ivor Greenwood
