= John Button (Australian politician) =

Australian politician

The Honourable John Button
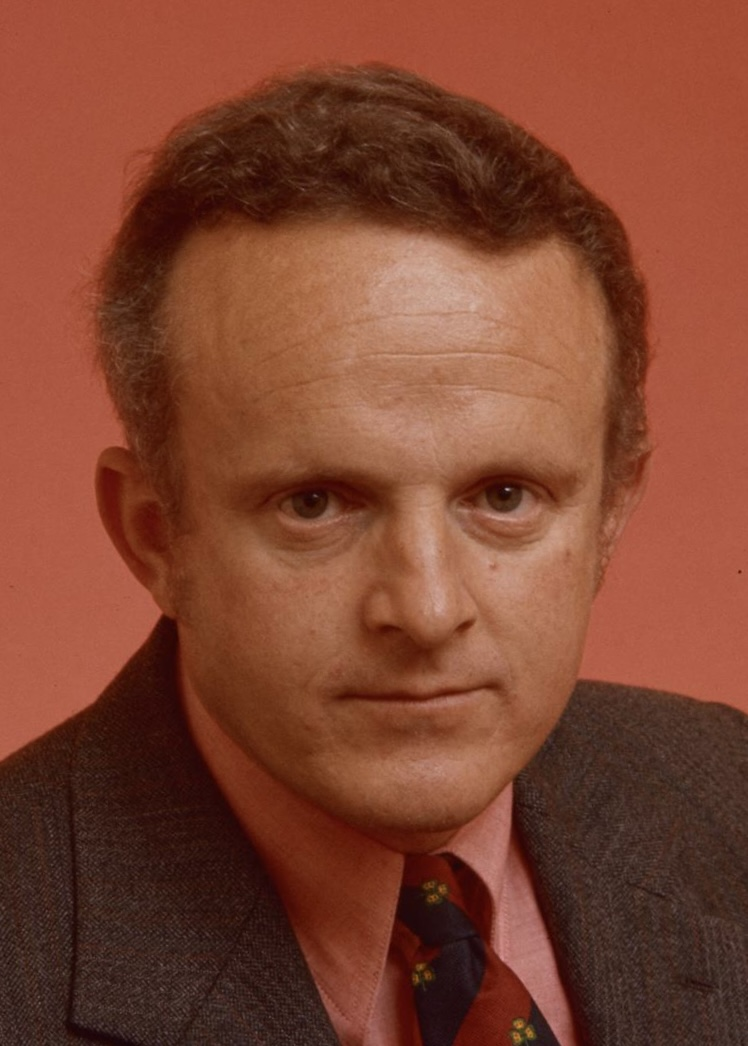
- Button in 1974

Leader of the Government in the Senate
- In office 11 March 1983 – 24 March 1993
- Prime Minister: Bob Hawke; Paul Keating
- Preceded by: John Carrick
- Succeeded by: Gareth Evans

Minister for Industry, Technology and Commerce
- In office 13 December 1984 – 24 March 1993
- Prime Minister: Bob Hawke; Paul Keating
- Preceded by: Himself
- Succeeded by: Alan Griffiths

Minister for Industry and Commerce
- In office 11 March 1983 – 13 December 1984
- Prime Minister: Bob Hawke
- Preceded by: Andrew Peacock
- Succeeded by: Himself

Leader of the Opposition in the Senate
- In office 7 November 1980 – 11 March 1983
- Preceded by: Ken Wriedt
- Succeeded by: Fred Chaney

Senator for Victoria
- In office 18 May 1974 – 31 March 1993
- Succeeded by: Kim Carr

Personal details
- Born: 30 June 1933 Ballarat, Victoria, Australia
- Died: 8 April 2008 (aged 74) Melbourne, Victoria
- Party: Labor
- Spouse(s): Marjorie Batten, 1961-1983 (div), Dorothy O’Neil, 1984 - 2000 (div), Joan Grant
- Children: 3

John Norman Button (30 June 1933 – 8 April 2008) was an Australian politician, who served as a senior minister in the Hawke and Keating Labor governments. He was notable for the Button car plan, which involved downsizing and eventually ending Australia's car industry by reducing tariffs and government protection.

== Early life ==
Button was born on 30 June 1932 in Ballarat, Victoria. He was the second of three children born to Dorothy Marion (née Grubb) and Clifford Norman Button. His father was a Presbyterian minister who was moderator of the Presbyterian Church of Victoria in the early 1940s.

Button attended Geelong College where he was active in the debating club and editor of the school newspaper and magazine. He went on to study law at the University of Melbourne, attending Ormond College. After graduating he briefly worked as a law clerk with Maurice Blackburn & Co., then travelled to Italy to study Italian at the University for Foreigners in Perugia. He joined the Italian Communist Party and attended the 6th World Festival of Youth and Students in Moscow, later volunteering with the International Union of Socialist Youth in Vienna.

In 1957, Button moved to London where he worked variously as a sandwich board man for a cinema, at a sausage and pie factory, and as a supply teacher. He joined the British Labour Party and later worked as a research assistant for the Trades Union Congress. He returned to Australia after two years and rejoined Maurice Blackburn. Button made regular appearances in the Magistrates' Court of Victoria and came to specialise in workers' compensation claims, also appearing for trade unions before the Commonwealth Conciliation and Arbitration Commission and the Commonwealth Industrial Court. He was made a partner at Maurice Blackburn in 1963 and was the founding president of the Society of Labor Lawyers in 1974. Outside of law he was interested in the theatre and was involved in several ventures with director Wal Cherry, including the creation of the Emerald Hill Theatre in 1962.

== Politics ==
=== Early activities ===
Button became active in the Australian Labor Party from the late 1950s. In the 1960s he joined a group of other middle-class Labor activists, such as John Cain, Barry Jones, Richard McGarvie, Frank Costigan and Michael Duffy, known as "the Participants" whose objective was to end left-wing control of the Victorian branch of the Labor Party.

In 1963, Button was invited to run as the Labor candidate for the seat of Chisholm, which was safely held by Wilfrid Kent Hughes. Party members recall that at the declaration of the poll Kent Hughes stood up and said in patrician tones, "It was a fair fight." To which Button replied, "It was neither fair nor a fight. I gained a swing of one: my mother."

In 1970, the Participants formed an alliance with the federal Labor leader Gough Whitlam and the President of the Australian Council of Trade Unions, Bob Hawke, to bring about intervention in the Victorian branch by the Federal Executive.

=== Senate ===
Button became part of the interim Advisory Council which took over the branch after intervention, and in 1974 he was elected to the Australian Senate as a strong supporter of Whitlam.

Button remained a backbencher during the remaining 18 months of the Whitlam government. He was elected to the Opposition Shadow Ministry in 1976 and was elected Deputy Labor Leader in the Senate in 1977. From 1980 to 1983 he was Leader of the Opposition in the Senate and Shadow Minister for Communications. He was also a member of the Labor National Executive.

A close friend of Labor Leader Bill Hayden, Button decided during 1982 that Hayden could not lead the party to victory at the election due in late 1983. When Liberal Prime Minister Malcolm Fraser called a snap election in February 1983, it was Button who told Hayden that he must resign immediately to make way for Bob Hawke. Button tapping Hayden on the shoulder would later be compared to Bill Shorten switching his support from Julia Gillard to Kevin Rudd in 2013. Button did not live to see this comparison as he died in 2008.

In 1983, when Hawke became Prime Minister, Button became Minister for Industry and Commerce, a post he held until 1993 and making him the longest serving minister in this portfolio. During this period Button carried through major changes in industry policy, lowering tariffs and reducing other forms of protectionism. This caused large job losses in manufacturing industry and provoked bitter opposition among Labor's trade union base.

Button was responsible for the Button car plan, which reorganised the Australian car industry in an attempt to make it competitive without tariff protection. One component of the plan was the sharing of models by local manufacturers, for example, Holden shared models with Toyota, and Ford shared models with Nissan. However, badge engineering proved unpopular from buyers, who preferred original models to their rebadged versions, and with manufacturers themselves.

Button resigned from the Senate on 31 March 1993, before his term expired on 1 July 1993. His successor, Kim Carr, who was elected in the 1993 election, was appointed to finish the remaining months of the term. In retirement he remained active in Labor affairs and published several volumes of amusing memoirs. He led a number of trade missions, joined company boards and served as a professorial fellow at Monash University. His son, James, is a prominent journalist.

In October 1994, more than 18 months after his retirement from the Senate, Button came out publicly to respond to an account made by Hawke in his memoirs. In his memoirs, Hawke wrote that in 1990, his then deputy and the man who would depose him, Keating had asked the rhetorical question of "What has the US ever done for us?" during a meeting of Federal Cabinet's security committee to decide Australia's involvement in the Gulf War. Button responded to this account by stating that it was he not Keating who had asked that rhetorical question.

== Death ==
John Button died on 8 April 2008 from pancreatic cancer.

== Bibliography ==
- Button, John (1994), Flying the kite: Travels of an Australian politician, Sydney: Random House. ISBN 0091828724.
- Button, John (1996), On the loose, Melbourne: Text Publishing. ISBN 1875847359.
- Button, John (1998), As it happened, Melbourne: Text Publishing. ISBN 1875847499.
- Weller, Patrick (1999), Dodging raindrops: John Button, a Labor life, Sydney: Allen & Unwin. ISBN 1865081361.
- Button, James (2012), Speechless: A year in my father's business, Melbourne: Melbourne University Press. ISBN 9780522858587.

Political offices
Preceded by Andrew Peacock	Minister for Industry and Commerce; 1983–1993	Succeeded by Alan Griffiths
Preceded by John Carrick	Leader of the Government in the Senate; 1983–1993	Succeeded by Gareth Evans
Party political offices
Preceded by Ken Wriedt	Leader of the Labor Party in the Senate; 1980–1993	Succeeded by Gareth Evans
