= Chief of Defence Intelligence (Australia) =

Role in Australian Defence Force

- Incumbent; Tom Hamilton since 1 July 2024
- Department of Defence
- Abbreviation: CDI
- Member of: Australian Defence Force
- Reports to: Chief of the Defence Force
- Formation: 1 July 2020
- First holder: Lieutenant General Gavan Reynolds
- Website: Official website

The Chief of Defence Intelligence (CDI) is a three-star role within the Australian Defence Force (ADF), responsible for the Defence Intelligence Group. The Minister of Defence, Linda Reynolds announced the creation of the new Defence Intelligence Group under the command of the CDI which brought the Defence Intelligence Organisation (DIO), Australian Geospatial-Intelligence Organisation (AGO) and some other elements together under a single command.

== Chiefs of Defence Intelligence ==
The following list chronologically records those who have held the post of CDI, with rank and honours as at the completion of the individual's term.

Rank	Name	Postnominals	Term began	Term ended
Lieutenant General	Gavan Reynolds	AO	1 July 2020	1 July 2024
	Tom Hamilton		1 July 2024	Incumbent

== See also ==
- Current senior Australian Defence Organisation personnel
