= Maurice Newman =

Australian businessman

Maurice Lionel Newman AC (born 20 April 1938 in Ilford, England) is an Australian businessman who has served in a range of public roles, including as Chairperson of the Australian Broadcasting Corporation, chair of the board of the Australian Stock Exchange, Chancellor of Macquarie University, and chair of the Prime Minister's Business Advisory Council from September 2013 to September 2015. His political views are generally considered conservative and he has been frequently described as a conspiracy theorist in the Australian media.

Since 2021, Newman has served as chairman of ADH TV. He is the father of Mark Newman, an investment banker and trade commissioner who became the leader of One Nation in NSW in 2026.

== Early life ==
Born in Ilford, in what was then Essex, Newman migrated to Sydney at a young age with his family, settling in Pymble. He was educated at North Sydney Boys High School and the University of Sydney, where he obtained a degree in economics.

Newman's father, Joseph was Jewish.

== Career ==
Newman's career spanned forty years in stockbroking and investment banking, including as Managing Director in 1984, and Executive Chairman from 1985 until 1999, of what is now the Deutsche Bank Group in Australia. He was Chairman of the Deutsche Bank Asia Pacific Advisory Board and a Director of Deutsche Bank Asia Pacific from 1999 to 2001. He was also Chairman of Deutsche Asset Management (Australia) Limited from 1997 until 2000; retiring from Deutsche Bank in July 2001.

Newman chaired a number of Asian business alliances including the East Asia and Oceania Stock Exchange Federation, and the Australia Taiwan Business Council. He has been an adviser to Australian governments, as a member of the Consultative Committee on Relations with Japan (1984–1987); a Commissioner of the National Commission of Audit (1996); a member of the Business Advisory Panel established by the Minister for Multicultural Affairs (1997–2002); Chairman of the National Judging Panel for Innovation in Local Government (1997–1998); Chairman of the Commonwealth Government's National Year 2000 Steering Committee (1997–2000) and the Business Mature Age Workforce Advisory Group (2000–2001); Co-Chair of the Singapore Australia Business Alliance Forum (1999–2002); Chairman of the Federal Treasurer's Financial Sector Advisory Council (1998–2007); Member of the New South Wales Premier's Major Events Board (2002–2004); Chairman of the Sydney Convention & Visitors Bureau (2001–2007); and Chairman of Tourism NSW (2002–2007).

In 1997, he was Australia's Private Sector Representative to the First Commonwealth Heads of Government Meeting Business Forum held in London. In 1999 he led a delegation of senior Australian executives to New York promoting "Australia, the Dynamic Success Story of the Asia Pacific - A Centre for Global Financial Services".

Newman was Chairman of Acrux Limited (1999–2003); Chairman of the Sydney Legacy Citizen's Committee (1998–2004); Member of the Advisory Committee of Australasian Medical Insurance Ltd (January – August 2003); Member of the Advisory Council of the Asia Society AustralAsia Centre (2001–2004); Member of the Business Council of Australia's Chairmen's Panel (2003–2007); and Civil Patron, Royal Australian Naval reserve, Professional Studies Program (2005–2009).

He served as Chancellor of Macquarie University from 2002 to February 2008. Currently he is an Honorary Professor at Macquarie University and Honorary Chair of the Macquarie University Foundation Patrons.

He was a Director of the Australian Broadcasting Corporation from 2000 to 2004; and served as Chairman of the ABC between 1 January 2007 to 31 March 2012. On 31 March 2012, he stood down as Chair of the ABC and was succeeded by James Spigelman AC QC.

In 2002 Newman was appointed an Advisor to the Marsh Group of Companies. In June 2004, he was appointed a Director of the Queensland Investment Corporation.

He retired as Chairman of ASX Limited on 24 September 2008.

== Political views ==
=== Conservatism ===
Newman helped establish the Centre for Independent Studies, a conservative Australian political think-tank. He was a member of the first CIS Board which also included Neville Kennard and Ross Graham-Taylor. Newman was associated with, and spoke at, a CIS event in December 2007 given in honour of conservative economist Milton Friedman. Newman is said to have been a close friend of former Australian Prime Minister John Howard. Interviewed in 2010 about their friendship by the Institute of Company Directors, Newman stated: "Much is made of my friendship with Howard, which is long standing. Little is made of my friendship with Bill Hayden, which is just as close and of longer standing. The truth is, I am not party political. I have voted on both sides of the fence, state and Federal, because I am driven not by labels, but by policies." During Newman's tenure as Chairman of the Australian Broadcasting Corporation, Rupert Murdoch delivered the 2008 Boyer Lectures, "A Golden Age of Freedom". On the subject of financial market regulation Newman is reported as having said: "Politicians are getting into regulation and Regulators want to get into business. Regulators should look at ways to ensure transparency, but should not end up killing the business."

=== Climate change ===
Newman rejects the scientific consensus on climate change. In a speech to senior ABC staff on 10 March 2010 he said climate change was an example of "group-think".

In answer to the question of whether he was a climate change denier he replied that he was an "agnostic" and said that there were "a lot of question marks about some of the fundamental data".

In an opinion piece in September 2013 Newman said that "The CSIRO … and the weather bureau, continue to propagate the myth of climate change …". In another 2013 piece he called climate change a delusion, stating that: "[The IPCC] progressively has applied mass psychology through a compliant media to spread the delusion that wicked Western industrialists are causing irreparable damage to the climate".

Newman opposes mandatory renewable energy targets and says renewable energy is pushing up prices.

In August 2014, Newman was widely criticised by leading scientists and newspaper journalists for claiming that the earth is undergoing "cooling" rather than warming. In 2015, Newman argued that climate change is propaganda aimed at bringing about a one world government controlled by the United Nations.

=== Wind farms ===
Newman has actively opposed wind energy development near his rural property at Crookwell in NSW, for example through involvement in the group Crookwell District Landscape Guardians. In 2006 he had his solicitors write to neighbours who had publicly indicated that were considering hosting wind turbines to assert that they would be "liable for substantial damages", and that he was "ready, willing and able to litigate".

Newman opposes the spread of wind energy and has advanced conspiracy theories about its use. In January 2012 he published an article in The Spectator in which he wrote,

"I am not a conspiracy theorist, but we have witnessed the birth of an extraordinary, universal and self-reinforcing movement among the political and executive arms of government, their academic consultants, the mainstream media and vested private sector interests (such as investment banks and the renewables industry), held together by the promise of unlimited government money. It may not be a conspiracy, but long-term, government-underwritten annuities have certainly created one gigantic and powerful oligopoly which must coerce taxpayers and penalise energy consumers to survive." His article concluded, "But don’t expect help from academia, mainstream media or the public service. They are members of the same establishment and worship together at the altar of global warming. By ruthlessly perpetuating the illusion that wind farms can somehow save the planet, they keep the money flowing. All the while the poor become poorer, ever more dependent on welfare and colder in winter."

In July 2014, Newman was "kicked off" a wind farm committee after it was discovered he was attempting to restrict speakers from attending meetings.

=== The Great Reset ===
Newman is a vocal opponent of the 2020 virtual dialogues organized by the World Economic Forum's under the theme of The Great Reset. In his scathing October 10, 2020 article criticizing the WEF 2020 annual meeting on the reset in a post-COVID 19 world, Newman warned that "anyone who fears big government and values free speech, freedom to choose and property rights, should be terrified". If the "dangerous elites" such as Prince Charles, the WEF director Klaus Schwab, the International Monetary Fund's managing director, the secretary general of the United Nations, the European Central Bank's president, the secretary-general of the OECD, and numerous other CEOs of technology companies, and nongovernmental organization representatives, succeed they will use the "opportunity" of the pandemic to further Green Plans and undermine capitalism around the world. Newman said that then President Donald Trump was a "major obstacle" to the WEF realizing its agenda of the great reset of society and the economy. Newman warned that now President Joe Biden—who was Trump's opponent in the 2020 United States presidential election, was Trump's "ideological opposite." Newman focused on certain terms used during the 2020 discussions on how to prepare for a post-COVID-19 world, such as "opportunity", "reimagine", "revamp", to frame the dialogues as a prelude to the imposition of a what he called a nefarious new world order, a well-known conspiracy theory. He said that the preparations for a post-pandemic world is just "another fascist experiment being pushed by controlling elitists" whose children "will receive preferential access to higher education and elite positions" and will ultimately result in "inequality, serfdom and misery". According to the BBC and The New York Times, by November 2021, there was a resurgence in the "baseless" great reset conspiracy theories.

=== Cricket ===
Newman wrote an article in 2023 where he attributed the loss of the Australian team in India to Australian cricketers being too "woke". The Australian cricket team subsequently won the World Test Championship and the World Cup and retained the Ashes. Newman's article has been regularly ridiculed by cricket writers.

== See also ==
- Conservatism in Australia
- Crookwell wind farm
- Howard government
- Renewable energy debate

Media offices
Preceded by Donald McDonald	Chair of the Australian Broadcasting Corporation; 2006–2012	Succeeded by James Spigelman
Academic offices
Preceded by Tim Besley	Chancellor of Macquarie University; 2002–2008	Succeeded by Michael Egan
