= Department of Industry, Technology and Commerce =

Former Australian government department

Department overview
- Formed: 13 December 1984
- Preceding Department: Department of Science and Technology – for technology and industrial research and development; Department of Defence Support – for offsets Department of Industry and Commerce (II) – for all functions except regional development
- Dissolved: 24 March 1993
- Superseding Department: Department of Industry, Technology and Regional Development
- Jurisdiction: Commonwealth of Australia
- Headquarters: Barton, Canberra
- Minister responsible: John Button, Minister
- Department executives: Tom Hayes, Secretary (1984–1985); David Charles, Secretary (1985–1990); Malcolm McIntosh, Secretary (1990); Neville Stevens, Secretary (1990–1993)

The Department of Industry, Technology and Commerce was an Australian government department that existed between December 1984 and March 1993.

== History ==
The Department was created by the Hawke government in December 1984, a substantial expansion of the previous Department of Industry and Commerce. Hawke reasoned that including responsibility for technology and civil offsets in the new Department would enable better integration of Australia's industry and technology policies and would increase the competitiveness of Australian industry stimulating growth and employment opportunities.

== Scope ==
Information about the department's functions and government funding allocation could be found in the Administrative Arrangements Orders, the annual Portfolio Budget Statements and in the Department's annual reports.

According to the Administrative Arrangements Order made on 13 December 1984, the Department dealt with:

- Manufacturing and Commerce (including industries development)
- Technology and industrial research and development
- Small business
- Duties of customs and excise
- Bounties on the production or export of goods
- Offsets, to the extent not dealt with by the Department of Defence

== Structure ==
The Department was an Australian Public Service department, staffed by officials who were responsible to the Minister for Industry, Technology and Commerce. The Minister was John Button.

From 13 December 1984 to 12 March 1985, the Secretary of the Department was Tom Hayes. Hayes left the department in 1985 to become Comptroller-General of the Australian Customs Service, which had been taken out of the department and established as a separate statutory authority.

From 13 March 1985 to 30 June 1990, the Secretary was David Charles. The third Secretary of the department was Malcolm McIntosh, from 1 July 1990 to 22 December 1990. Neville Stevens was appointed the department's fourth and final secretary in December 1990.
