= Australian Customs Service =

Australian government agency responsible for Australian border protection (1985-2009)

- Australian Customs Flag

Agency overview
- Formed: 1 July 1985
- Preceding Agency: Department of Business and Consumer Affairs Bureau of Customs (1975–1982)
- Dissolved: 22 May 2009
- Superseding Agency: Australian Customs and Border Protection Service
- Type: Statutory authority
- Jurisdiction: Government of Australia
- Headquarters: Customs House Canberra; 35°17′1″S 149°7′55″E
- Employees: 6,284 (in April 2008)
- Minister responsible: Minister for Justice and Customs; Minister for Home Affairs
- Agency executives: Michael Carmody, Chief Executive Officer (2006–2009); Lionel Woodward, Chief Executive Officer (1994–2005); Frank Kelly, Comptroller‑General (1988–1994); Tom Hayes, Comptroller‑General (1985–1988)

The Australian Customs Service was an Australian Government agency responsible for Australian border protection, duties and taxes between 1985 and 2009. The Service was first under the portfolio of the Department of Industry, Technology and Commerce from 1985 to 1998 and then the Attorney-General's Department from 1998 to 2009.

In 1998, the collection of Excise duties was transferred to the Australian Taxation Office. The Service was dismantled in 2009 and replaced with the newly augmented, retasked and renamed Australian Customs and Border Protection Service which moved from AGD to the newly established Department of Immigration and Border Protection in September 2013.

== History ==
The Australian Customs Service was created as an independent authority by the Hawke government in 1985 under the Commonwealth Customs Administration Act 1985 after operating as a departmental entity from 1982 to 1985 within the Department of Industry, Technology and Commerce and as the Department of Business and Consumer Affairs Bureau of Customs from 1975 to 1982.

In December 2008 then prime minister Kevin Rudd announced that the Australian Government would be augmenting, re-tasking and renaming the Australian Customs Service to create the new Australian Customs and Border Protection Service. Royal assent was given to the changes on 22 May 2009 and the Australian Customs and Border Protection Service was established.

== Role and functions ==
The role of the Australian Customs Service was to prevent the illegal movement of people and harmful goods across Australia's border, and to apply trade measures and collect border-related duties and taxes.

== Structure ==
Customs was an Australian Public Service agency, staffed by officials who were responsible to the agency's minister. The responsible minister was the minister for home affairs from 2007 to 2009, the minister for justice and customs from 1998 to 2007, and the attorney-general of Australia between 1998 and 2007.

Between 1 January 2006 and 22 May 2009, the chief executive officer of the agency was Michael Carmody. Lionel Woodward was chief executive officer between 1994 and 2005. Frank Kelly was comptroller-general of customs (and head of the agency) between 1988 and 1994. Prior to Kelly, Tom Hayes headed the agency from its establishment to 1988.
