= Department of Customs and Excise =

Australian government department, 1956–1975

Department overview
- Formed: 11 January 1956
- Preceding Department: Department of Trade and Customs
- Dissolved: 27 March 1975
- Superseding Department: Department of Police and Customs
- Jurisdiction: Commonwealth of Australia
- Department executives: Frank Meere, Secretary (1956–1960); Alf Rattigan, Secretary (1960–1963); Francis Jeremiah Harrison, Secretary (1963–1966); Alan Carmody, Secretary (1966–1975)

The Department of Customs and Excise was an Australian government department that existed between January 1956 and March 1975.

== Scope ==
Information about the department's functions and government funding allocation could be found in the Administrative Arrangements Orders, the annual Portfolio Budget Statements and in the department's annual reports.

In the 23 April 1958 Administrative Arrangements Order, the department's functions were:

- Duties of Customs and Excise
- Bounties on the production or export of goods.

== Structure ==
The department was a Commonwealth Public Service department, staffed by officials who were responsible to the Minister for Customs and Excise.
