= Geoffrey Yeend =

Australian public servant

Sir Geoffrey Yeend AC CBE
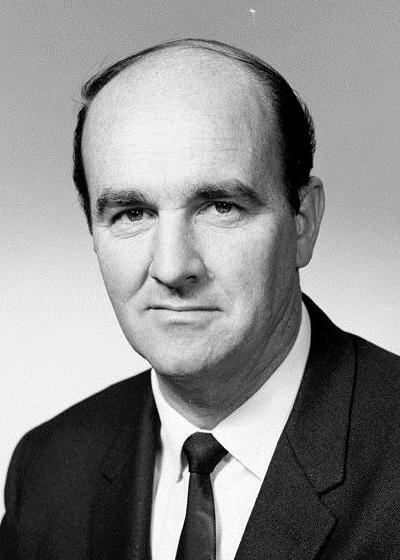
- Yeend in 1970

Secretary of the Department of the Prime Minister and Cabinet
- In office 18 April 1978 – 10 February 1986

Personal details
- Born: Geoffrey John Yeend; 1 May 1927 Melbourne, Australia
- Died: 6 October 1994 (aged 67)
- Spouse: Laurel
- Children: 2
- Education: Australian National University; University of Melbourne
- Occupation: Public servant

Sir Geoffrey John "Geoff" Yeend AC CBE (1 May 1927 – 6 October 1994) was a senior Australian public servant. He was Secretary of the Department of the Prime Minister and Cabinet between 1978 and 1986.

== Life and career ==
Geoffrey Yeend was born on 1 May 1927 in Melbourne.

Following his father's footsteps into the Commonwealth Public Service, Geoffrey Yeend began his career in 1945 in the Department of Post-War Reconstruction.

Prime Minister Malcolm Fraser appointed Yeend Secretary of the Department of the Prime Minister and Cabinet in April 1978, after Yeend had been with the Department since 1950.

Yeend left the public service in 1986, following a heart attack. Both in working life as a Commonwealth public servant and after his retirement, Yeend was highly committed to community life in Canberra as a golfer, hockey player, board director, charitable contributor and as Chancellor of the Australian National University. He was well-respected and admired by many in the local community.

Yeend died in Sydney on 6 October 1994.

== Awards and honours ==
Yeend was appointed a Commander of the Order of the British Empire in June 1976. He was honoured again in 1979 when he was made a Knight Bachelor.

In January 1986 he was appointed a Companion of the Order of Australia for public service particularly as Secretary of the Department of the Prime Minister and Cabinet and as Secretary to Cabinet.

He was also bestowed with the Order of the Rising Sun, Gold and Silver Star, by the Emperor of Japan for his contribution to promoting economic and cultural relations between Australia and Japan.

In 2012, a street in the Canberra suburb of Casey was named Yeend Avenue in his honour.

Government offices
Preceded by Alan Carmody	Secretary of the Department of the Prime Minister and Cabinet; 1978 – 1986	Succeeded by Mike Codd
Academic offices
Preceded by Sir Gordon Jackson	Chancellor of the Australian National University; 1990 – 1994	Succeeded by Peter Baume
