= Wine equalisation tax =

Tax on wine in Australia

Wine equalisation tax (WET) is a tax imposed on wine made, imported, or sold by wholesale in Australia. It is applied at 29% of the wholesale value of wine.

== Background ==
In Australia, wine is taxed differently to other alcoholic beverages. While other beverages are taxed based on their alcohol content, wine is taxed at a flat 29% rate, which, on a per standard drink basis, generally makes tax on wine less than other alcoholic beverages.

== Rebates ==
A number of rebates are available to wine producers based in Australia and New Zealand, with eligible produces originally able to claim up to $A350,000 annually. These rebates were introduced in 2004 and intended to assist small rural wineries. They were estimated to cost the Australian Federal Budget $A300 million in 2016.

=== Allegations of rorting ===
Following allegations of rorting, then Assistant Treasurer Josh Frydenberg announced in 2015 the establishment of a consultation group consisting of industry representatives to find solutions to the use of "contrived schemes" designed to exploit the rebate.

=== Reforms ===
In August 2017 reforms passed the Parliament of Australia which reduced the annual rebate available to $A350,000 and changed eligibility to require wine producers to grow at least 85% of the grapes used in their wine-making process.

== See also ==
- Australian wine
