= Gordon Jackson (businessman) =

Australian businessman (1924-1991)

Sir Gordon Jackson AK
- Born: Ronald Gordon Jackson; 5 May 1924; New Farm, Queensland
- Died: 1 June 1991 (aged 67); Pymble, New South Wales
- Education: Brisbane Grammar School
- Alma mater: University of Queensland
- Occupation: Businessman
- Board member of: CSR Limited (1972–1985); Pilbara Iron (1972–75); Gove Alumina (1972–77); Thiess Holdings (1980–82); Australian Graduate School of Management (1976–1981); Chancellor of the Australian National University (1987–1990); Reserve Bank of Australia (1975–1990)
- Awards: Companion of the Order of Australia (1976); Knight of the Order of Australia (1983); Commander's Cross of the Order of Merit of the Federal Republic of Germany (1980); Grand Cordon of the Order of the Sacred Treasures of Japan (1987); Prime Minister of Japan's Trade Award (1987)

Sir Ronald Gordon Jackson AK (5 May 1924 – 1 June 1991) was an Australian businessman.

== Biography ==
Jackson was educated at Brisbane Grammar School and the University of Queensland, where he was awarded the Archibald Scholarship and graduated with a BCom degree in 1949.

He joined CSR Limited in 1941 and stayed with the organisation and its subsidiaries until 1985. During this time, he served as General Manager and Chief Executive (1972–82), Director (1972–83) and Deputy Chairman of CSR (1983–85). He was Chairman of Pilbara Iron (1972–75), Gove Alumina (1972–77) and Thiess Holdings (1980–82). He served as foundation chairman of the Board of Management of the Australian Graduate School of Management 1976–1981, Chancellor of the Australian National University from 1987–1990, and a member of the board of the Reserve Bank of Australia from 1975–1990.

Jackson served on the board of several organisations including the Foundation for Development Corporation, Australian Industry Development Corporation, and Sydney Hospital Foundation for Research, Police Board of New South Wales, Order of Australia Association and the Salvation Army. He was nominated as a member of the first Australian Government trade mission (headed by Sir Ian McLennan) to China in May 1973, chaired the Whitlam government’s committee (the Jackson Committee, 1974–75) that advised the government on policies for Australia's manufacturing industry, and the Committee to Review Australia's Overseas Aid Program (1983–84).

Jackson was awarded numerous Australian and overseas awards and honours, including Companion of the Order of Australia (1976), The Australian newspaper’s Australian of the Year (1980), the Australian Institute of Management’s John Storey Medal (1978), James N Kirby Memorial Medal (1976), Commander’s Cross of the Order of Merit of the Federal Republic of Germany (1980), Prime Minister of Japan’s Trade Award (1987), Grand Cordon (first class) Order of the Sacred Treasure of Japan (1987). He served as President of the Order of Australia Association between 1983 and 1986.

He was appointed Knight of the Order of Australia in 1983 for service to industry and to the community.

Jackson died on 1 June 1991.

== Honours ==
=== Australian orders ===
- Order of Australia
  - Companion (1976)
  - Knight (1983)

=== Foreign orders and awards ===
- Commander's Cross of the Order of Merit of the Federal Republic of Germany (1980)
- Grand Cordon of the Order of the Sacred Treasures of Japan (1987)
- Prime Minister of Japan's Trade Award (1987)

Academic offices
Preceded by Richard Blackburn	Chancellor of the Australian National University; 1987–1990	Succeeded by Geoffrey Yeend
