= Department of Police and Customs =

Australian government department, 1975–1975

Department overview
- Formed: 27 March 1975
- Preceding Department: Department of Customs and Excise – for Customs and Excise Attorney-General's Department – for Police Forces of the NT, ACT and Norfolk Island and for matters arising under the Commonwealth Police Act
- Dissolved: 22 December 1975
- Superseding Department: Department of the Capital Territory – for ACT policing Department of Administrative Services (II) – for Commonwealth and Norfolk Island policing Department of the Northern Territory (II) – for NT policing Department of Business and Consumer Affairs – for Customs and Excise
- Jurisdiction: Commonwealth of Australia
- Ministers responsible: Kep Enderby, Minister (Mar – Jun 1975); Jim Cavanagh, Minister (Jun – Nov 1975); Ivor Greenwood, Minister (Nov – Dec 1975)
- Department executive: Alan Carmody, Secretary

The Department of Police and Customs was an Australian government department that existed between March and December 1975.

== History ==
The department was established while the Whitlam government was in power. Shortly after the Fraser government took office in November 1975, following the 1975 Australian constitutional crisis, the Department was abolished.

== Scope ==
Information about the department's functions and government funding allocation could be found in the Administrative Arrangements Orders, the annual Portfolio Budget Statements and in the Department's annual reports.

At its creation, the Department's functions were:

- Police forces of the Northern Territory of Australia, the Australian Capital Territory and Norfolk Island
- Duties of Customs and Excise Bounties on the production or export of goods

== Structure ==
The department was a Commonwealth Public Service department, staffed by officials who were responsible to the Minister for Police and Customs. The Secretary of the department was Alan Carmody.
