= Department of Business and Consumer Affairs =

Australian government department, 1975–1982

Department overview
- Formed: 22 December 1975
- Preceding Department: Department of Science and Consumer Affairs – for consumer affairs Department of Police and Customs – for Customs and Excise Department of the Special Minister of State (I) – for industries assistance and prices justification Attorney-General's Department – for bankruptcy, insolvency, patents, trade marks, design and copyright
- Dissolved: 7 May 1982
- Superseding Department: Attorney-General's Department – for Corporate Affairs trade practices and consumer affairs Department of Industry and Commerce (II) – for customs excise duties and bounties Department of Administrative Services (II) – for industries assistance and protection, petroleum pricing policy
- Jurisdiction: Commonwealth of Australia
- Headquarters: Canberra
- Department executives: Alan Carmody, Secretary (1975–1976); Tim Besley, Secretary (1976–1982); Tom Hayes, Secretary (1982)

The Department of Business and Consumer Affairs was an Australian government department that existed between December 1975 and May 1982.

== Scope ==
Information about the department's functions and government funding allocation could be found in the Administrative Arrangements Orders, the annual Portfolio Budget Statements and in the department's annual reports.

At its creation, the department was responsible for the following:

- Business practices
- Duties of customs and excise
- Bounties on the production or export of goods
- Bankruptcy and insolvency
- Patents of inventions and designs, and trade marks
- Copyrights
- Consumer Affairs.

== Structure ==
The department was an Australian Public Service department, staffed by officials who were responsible to the Minister for Business and Consumer Affairs.
