= List of senators from Victoria =

Victoria Australian Senate
- Created: 1901
- Party: Labor (5); Coalition (4) (Note: Liberal (3); National (1)); Greens (1); United Australia (1); Independent (1)

This is a list of senators from the state of Victoria since the Federation of Australia in 1901.

== List ==
Senate	Election	Senator (party)	Senator (party)	Senator (party)	Senator (party)	Senator (party)	Senator (party)	Senator (party)	Senator (party)	Senator (party)	Senator (party)	Senator (party)	Senator (party)
1901–1903	1901	James Styles (Protectionist)	John Barrett (Labor)	Robert Best (Protectionist/ Liberal)	Simon Fraser (Protectionist/ Liberal)	Sir Frederick Sargood (Free Trade)	Sir William Zeal (Protectionist)	6 senators per state 1901-1950					
1901–1903	1903	James Styles (Protectionist)	John Barrett (Labor)	Robert Best (Protectionist/ Liberal)	Simon Fraser (Protectionist/ Liberal)	Robert Reid (Free Trade)	Sir William Zeal (Protectionist)	6 senators per state 1901-1950					
1904–1906	1903	James Styles (Protectionist)	Edward Findley (Labor)	Robert Best (Protectionist/ Liberal)	Simon Fraser (Protectionist/ Liberal)	William Trenwith (Independent)	Sir William Zeal (Protectionist)	6 senators per state 1901-1950					
1907–1910	1906	Edward Russell (Labor/ National Labor/ Nationalist)	Edward Findley (Labor)	Robert Best (Protectionist/ Liberal)	Simon Fraser (Protectionist/ Liberal)	William Trenwith (Independent)	James McColl (Anti-Socialist /Liberal)	6 senators per state 1901-1950					
1907–1910	1909	Edward Russell (Labor/ National Labor/ Nationalist)	Edward Findley (Labor)	Robert Best (Protectionist/ Liberal)	Simon Fraser (Protectionist/ Liberal)	William Trenwith (Independent)	James McColl (Anti-Socialist /Liberal)	6 senators per state 1901-1950					
1910–1913	1910	Edward Russell (Labor/ National Labor/ Nationalist)	Edward Findley (Labor)	Albert Blakey (Labor)	Simon Fraser (Protectionist/ Liberal)	Stephen Barker (Labor)	James McColl (Anti-Socialist /Liberal)	6 senators per state 1901-1950					
1913–1914	1913	Edward Russell (Labor/ National Labor/ Nationalist)	Edward Findley (Labor)	Albert Blakey (Labor)	John Barnes (Labor)	Stephen Barker (Labor)	James McColl (Anti-Socialist /Liberal)	6 senators per state 1901-1950					
1914–1917	1914	Edward Russell (Labor/ National Labor/ Nationalist)	Edward Findley (Labor)	Albert Blakey (Labor)	John Barnes (Labor)	Stephen Barker (Labor)	Andrew McKissock (Labor)	6 senators per state 1901-1950					
1914–1917	1916	Edward Russell (Labor/ National Labor/ Nationalist)	Edward Findley (Labor)	Albert Blakey (Labor)	John Barnes (Labor)	Stephen Barker (Labor)	Andrew McKissock (Labor)	6 senators per state 1901-1950					
1914–1917	1917	Edward Russell (Labor/ National Labor/ Nationalist)	Edward Findley (Labor)	Albert Blakey (Labor)	John Barnes (Labor)	Stephen Barker (Labor)	Andrew McKissock (Labor)	6 senators per state 1901-1950					
1917–1920	1917	Edward Russell (Labor/ National Labor/ Nationalist)	George Fairbairn (Nationalist)	William Plain (Nationalist)	John Barnes (Labor)	Stephen Barker (Labor)	William Bolton (Nationalist)	6 senators per state 1901-1950					
1920–1923	1919	Edward Russell (Labor/ National Labor/ Nationalist)	George Fairbairn (Nationalist)	William Plain (Nationalist)	James Guthrie (Nationalist/ UAP)	Harold Elliott (Nationalist)	William Bolton (Nationalist)	6 senators per state 1901-1950					
1923–1926	1922	Edward Russell (Labor/ National Labor/ Nationalist)	Edward Findley (Labor)	John Barnes (Labor)	James Guthrie (Nationalist/ UAP)	Harold Elliott (Nationalist)	Stephen Barker (Labor)	6 senators per state 1901-1950					
1923–1926	1924	Edward Russell (Labor/ National Labor/ Nationalist)	Edward Findley (Labor)	John Barnes (Labor)	James Guthrie (Nationalist/ UAP)	Harold Elliott (Nationalist)	Joseph Hannan (Labor)	6 senators per state 1901-1950					
1923–1926	1925	William Plain (Nationalist/ UAP)	Edward Findley (Labor)	John Barnes (Labor)	James Guthrie (Nationalist/ UAP)	Harold Elliott (Nationalist)	David Andrew (Country)	6 senators per state 1901-1950					
1926–1929	1925	William Plain (Nationalist/ UAP)	Edward Findley (Labor)	John Barnes (Labor)	James Guthrie (Nationalist/ UAP)	Harold Elliott (Nationalist)	David Andrew (Country)	6 senators per state 1901-1950					
1926–1929	1928	William Plain (Nationalist/ UAP)	Edward Findley (Labor)	John Barnes (Labor)	James Guthrie (Nationalist/ UAP)	Harold Elliott (Nationalist)	Richard Abbott (Country)	6 senators per state 1901-1950					
1929–1932	1928	William Plain (Nationalist/ UAP)	Harry Lawson (Nationalist /UAP)	John Barnes (Labor)	James Guthrie (Nationalist/ UAP)	Harold Elliott (Nationalist)	Robert Elliott (Country)	6 senators per state 1901-1950					
1929–1932	1931	William Plain (Nationalist/ UAP)	Harry Lawson (Nationalist /UAP)	John Barnes (Labor)	James Guthrie (Nationalist/ UAP)	Tom Brennan (UAP)	Robert Elliott (Country)	6 senators per state 1901-1950					
1932–1935	1931	William Plain (Nationalist/ UAP)	Harry Lawson (Nationalist /UAP)	John Barnes (Labor)	James Guthrie (Nationalist/ UAP)	Tom Brennan (UAP)	Robert Elliott (Country)	6 senators per state 1901-1950					
1935–1938	1934	William Plain (Nationalist/ UAP)	Charles Brand (UAP/ Liberal)	John Leckie (UAP/ Liberal)	James Guthrie (Nationalist/ UAP)	Tom Brennan (UAP)	William Gibson (Country)	6 senators per state 1901-1950					
1938–1941	1937	Richard Keane (Labor)	Charles Brand (UAP/ Liberal)	John Leckie (UAP/ Liberal)	Don Cameron (Labor)	Jim Sheehan (Labor)	William Gibson (Country)	6 senators per state 1901-1950					
1938–1941	1940	Richard Keane (Labor)	Charles Brand (UAP/ Liberal)	John Leckie (UAP/ Liberal)	Don Cameron (Labor)	John Spicer (UAP)	William Gibson (Country)	6 senators per state 1901-1950					
1941–1944	1940	Richard Keane (Labor)	Charles Brand (UAP/ Liberal)	John Leckie (UAP/ Liberal)	Don Cameron (Labor)	John Spicer (UAP)	William Gibson (Country)	6 senators per state 1901-1950					
1944–1947	1943	Richard Keane (Labor)	Charles Brand (UAP/ Liberal)	John Leckie (UAP/ Liberal)	Don Cameron (Labor)	Jim Sheehan (Labor)	William Gibson (Country)	6 senators per state 1901-1950					
1944–1947	1945	Richard Keane (Labor)	Charles Brand (UAP/ Liberal)	John Leckie (UAP/ Liberal)	Don Cameron (Labor)	Jim Sheehan (Labor)	William Gibson (Country)	6 senators per state 1901-1950					
1944–1947	May 1946	Alexander Fraser (Country)	Charles Brand (UAP/ Liberal)	John Leckie (UAP/ Liberal)	Don Cameron (Labor)	Jim Sheehan (Labor)	William Gibson (Country)	6 senators per state 1901-1950					
1944–1947	Sep 1946	Jack Devlin (Labor)	Charles Brand (UAP/ Liberal)	John Leckie (UAP/ Liberal)	Don Cameron (Labor)	Jim Sheehan (Labor)	William Gibson (Country)	6 senators per state 1901-1950					
1947–1950	1946	Jack Devlin (Labor)	Charles Sandford (Labor)	Fred Katz (Labor)	Don Cameron (Labor)	Jim Sheehan (Labor)	Bert Hendrickson (Labor)	6 senators per state 1901-1950					
1947–1950	1950	Jack Devlin (Labor)	Charles Sandford (Labor)	Fred Katz (Labor)	Don Cameron (Labor)	Jim Sheehan (Labor)	Bert Hendrickson (Labor)	John Gorton (Liberal)	John Spicer (Liberal)	Dame Ivy Wedgwood (Liberal)	George Rankin (Country)	10 senators per state 1950-1984	
1950–1951	1949	Jack Devlin (Labor)	Charles Sandford (Labor)	Fred Katz (Labor)	Don Cameron (Labor)	Jim Sheehan (Labor)	Bert Hendrickson (Labor)	John Gorton (Liberal)	John Spicer (Liberal)	Dame Ivy Wedgwood (Liberal)	George Rankin (Country)	10 senators per state 1950-1984	
1951–1953	1951	Jack Devlin (Labor)	Charles Sandford (Labor)	Magnus Cormack (Liberal)	Don Cameron (Labor)	Jim Sheehan (Labor)	Bert Hendrickson (Labor)	John Gorton (Liberal)	John Spicer (Liberal)	Dame Ivy Wedgwood (Liberal)	George Rankin (Country)	10 senators per state 1950-1984	
1953–1956	1953	Jack Devlin (Labor)	Charles Sandford (Labor)	Pat Kennelly (Labor)	Don Cameron (Labor)	Jim Sheehan (Labor)	Bert Hendrickson (Labor)	John Gorton (Liberal)	John Spicer (Liberal)	Dame Ivy Wedgwood (Liberal)	George Rankin (Country)	10 senators per state 1950-1984	
1956–1959	1955	Jack Devlin (Labor)	Frank McManus (DLP)	Pat Kennelly (Labor)	Don Cameron (Labor)	Jim Sheehan (Labor)	Bert Hendrickson (Labor)	John Gorton (Liberal)	John Spicer (Liberal)	Dame Ivy Wedgwood (Liberal)	Harrie Wade (Country)	10 senators per state 1950-1984	
1956–1959	1956	Jack Devlin (Labor)	Frank McManus (DLP)	Pat Kennelly (Labor)	Don Cameron (Labor)	Jim Sheehan (Labor)	Bert Hendrickson (Labor)	John Gorton (Liberal)	George Hannan (Liberal)	Dame Ivy Wedgwood (Liberal)	Harrie Wade (Country)	10 senators per state 1950-1984	
1956–1959	1957	Charles Sandford (Labor)	Frank McManus (DLP)	Pat Kennelly (Labor)	Don Cameron (Labor)	Jim Sheehan (Labor)	Bert Hendrickson (Labor)	John Gorton (Liberal)	George Hannan (Liberal)	Dame Ivy Wedgwood (Liberal)	Harrie Wade (Country)	10 senators per state 1950-1984	
1959–1962	1958	Charles Sandford (Labor)	Frank McManus (DLP)	Pat Kennelly (Labor)	Don Cameron (Labor)	Jim Sheehan (Labor)	Bert Hendrickson (Labor)	John Gorton (Liberal)	George Hannan (Liberal)	Dame Ivy Wedgwood (Liberal)	Harrie Wade (Country)	10 senators per state 1950-1984	
1962–1965	1961	Charles Sandford (Labor)	Magnus Cormack (Liberal)	Pat Kennelly (Labor)	Marie Breen (Liberal)	Sam Cohen (Labor)	Bert Hendrickson (Labor)	John Gorton (Liberal)	George Hannan (Liberal)	Dame Ivy Wedgwood (Liberal)	Harrie Wade (Country)	10 senators per state 1950-1984	
1962–1965	1964	Charles Sandford (Labor)	Magnus Cormack (Liberal)	Pat Kennelly (Labor)	Marie Breen (Liberal)	Sam Cohen (Labor)	Bert Hendrickson (Labor)	John Gorton (Liberal)	George Hannan (Liberal)	Dame Ivy Wedgwood (Liberal)	James Webster (NCP)	10 senators per state 1950-1984	
1965–1968	1964	Charles Sandford (Labor)	Magnus Cormack (Liberal)	Pat Kennelly (Labor)	Marie Breen (Liberal)	Sam Cohen (Labor)	Bert Hendrickson (Labor)	John Gorton (Liberal)	Frank McManus (DLP)	Dame Ivy Wedgwood (Liberal)	James Webster (NCP)	10 senators per state 1950-1984	
1965–1968	1966	George Poyser (Labor)	Magnus Cormack (Liberal)	Pat Kennelly (Labor)	Marie Breen (Liberal)	Sam Cohen (Labor)	Bert Hendrickson (Labor)	John Gorton (Liberal)	Frank McManus (DLP)	Dame Ivy Wedgwood (Liberal)	James Webster (NCP)	10 senators per state 1950-1984	
1968–1971	1967	George Poyser (Labor)	Magnus Cormack (Liberal)	Pat Kennelly (Labor)	Jack Little (DLP)	Sam Cohen (Labor)	Bert Hendrickson (Labor)	John Gorton (Liberal)	Frank McManus (DLP)	Dame Ivy Wedgwood (Liberal)	James Webster (NCP)	10 senators per state 1950-1984	
1968–1971	1968	George Poyser (Labor)	Magnus Cormack (Liberal)	Pat Kennelly (Labor)	Jack Little (DLP)	Sam Cohen (Labor)	Bert Hendrickson (Labor)	Ivor Greenwood (Liberal)	Frank McManus (DLP)	Dame Ivy Wedgwood (Liberal)	James Webster (NCP)	10 senators per state 1950-1984	
1968–1971	1969	George Poyser (Labor)	Magnus Cormack (Liberal)	Pat Kennelly (Labor)	Jack Little (DLP)	Bill Brown (Labor)	Bert Hendrickson (Labor)	Ivor Greenwood (Liberal)	Frank McManus (DLP)	Dame Ivy Wedgwood (Liberal)	James Webster (NCP)	10 senators per state 1950-1984	
1968–1971	1970	George Poyser (Labor)	Magnus Cormack (Liberal)	Pat Kennelly (Labor)	Jack Little (DLP)	George Hannan (Liberal/ National Liberal)	Bert Hendrickson (Labor)	Ivor Greenwood (Liberal)	Frank McManus (DLP)	Dame Ivy Wedgwood (Liberal)	James Webster (NCP)	10 senators per state 1950-1984	
1971–1974	1970	George Poyser (Labor)	Magnus Cormack (Liberal)	Cyril Primmer (Labor)	Jack Little (DLP)	George Hannan (Liberal/ National Liberal)	Bill Brown (Labor)	Ivor Greenwood (Liberal)	Frank McManus (DLP)	Margaret Guilfoyle (Liberal)	James Webster (NCP)	10 senators per state 1950-1984	
1971–1974	1974	George Poyser (Labor)	Magnus Cormack (Liberal)	Cyril Primmer (Labor)	Jack Little (DLP)	George Hannan (Liberal/ National Liberal)	Bill Brown (Labor)	Ivor Greenwood (Liberal)	Frank McManus (DLP)	Margaret Guilfoyle (Liberal)	James Webster (NCP)	10 senators per state 1950-1984	
1974–1975	1974	George Poyser (Labor)	Magnus Cormack (Liberal)	Cyril Primmer (Labor)	John Button (Labor)	Alan Missen (Liberal)	Bill Brown (Labor)	Ivor Greenwood (Liberal)	Jean Melzer (Labor)	Margaret Guilfoyle (Liberal)	James Webster (NCP)	10 senators per state 1950-1984	
1975–1978	1975	Tom Tehan (NCP)	Magnus Cormack (Liberal)	Cyril Primmer (Labor)	John Button (Labor)	Alan Missen (Liberal)	Bill Brown (Labor)	Ivor Greenwood (Liberal)	Jean Melzer (Labor)	Margaret Guilfoyle (Liberal)	James Webster (NCP)	10 senators per state 1950-1984	
1975–1978	1976	Tom Tehan (NCP)	Magnus Cormack (Liberal)	Cyril Primmer (Labor)	John Button (Labor)	Alan Missen (Liberal)	Bill Brown (Labor)	Austin Lewis (Liberal)	Jean Melzer (Labor)	Margaret Guilfoyle (Liberal)	James Webster (NCP)	10 senators per state 1950-1984	
1978–1981	1977	Don Chipp (Democrat)	David Hamer (Liberal)	Cyril Primmer (Labor)	John Button (Labor)	Alan Missen (Liberal)	Gareth Evans (Labor)	Austin Lewis (Liberal)	Jean Melzer (Labor)	Margaret Guilfoyle (Liberal)	James Webster (NCP)	10 senators per state 1950-1984	
1978–1981	1980	Don Chipp (Democrat)	David Hamer (Liberal)	Cyril Primmer (Labor)	John Button (Labor)	Alan Missen (Liberal)	Gareth Evans (Labor)	Austin Lewis (Liberal)	Jean Melzer (Labor)	Margaret Guilfoyle (Liberal)	Laurence Neal (NCP)	10 senators per state 1950-1984	
1981–1983	1980	Don Chipp (Democrat)	David Hamer (Liberal)	Cyril Primmer (Labor)	John Button (Labor)	Alan Missen (Liberal)	Gareth Evans (Labor)	Austin Lewis (Liberal)	John Siddons (Democrat)	Margaret Guilfoyle (Liberal)	Robert Ray (Labor)	10 senators per state 1950-1984	
1983–1985	1983	Don Chipp (Democrat)	David Hamer (Liberal)	Cyril Primmer (Labor)	John Button (Labor)	Alan Missen (Liberal)	Gareth Evans (Labor)	Austin Lewis (Liberal)	Olive Zakharov (Labor)	Margaret Guilfoyle (Liberal)	Robert Ray (Labor)	10 senators per state 1950-1984	
1983–1985	1984	Don Chipp (Democrat)	David Hamer (Liberal)	Cyril Primmer (Labor)	John Button (Labor)	Alan Missen (Liberal)	Gareth Evans (Labor)	Austin Lewis (Liberal)	Olive Zakharov (Labor)	Margaret Guilfoyle (Liberal)	Robert Ray (Labor)	Jim Short (Liberal)	Barney Cooney (Labor)
1985–1987	1984	Don Chipp (Democrat)	David Hamer (Liberal)	John Siddons (Democrat/ Independent/ Unite Australia)	John Button (Labor)	Alan Missen (Liberal)	Gareth Evans (Labor)	Austin Lewis (Liberal)	Olive Zakharov (Labor)	Margaret Guilfoyle (Liberal)	Robert Ray (Labor)	Jim Short (Liberal)	Barney Cooney (Labor)
1985–1987	1986	Janet Powell (Democrat /Independent)	David Hamer (Liberal)	John Siddons (Democrat/ Independent/ Unite Australia)	John Button (Labor)	Richard Alston (Liberal)	Gareth Evans (Labor)	Austin Lewis (Liberal)	Olive Zakharov (Labor)	Margaret Guilfoyle (Liberal)	Robert Ray (Labor)	Jim Short (Liberal)	Barney Cooney (Labor)
1985–1987	1987	Janet Powell (Democrat /Independent)	David Hamer (Liberal)	John Siddons (Democrat/ Independent/ Unite Australia)	John Button (Labor)	Richard Alston (Liberal)	Gareth Evans (Labor)	Austin Lewis (Liberal)	Olive Zakharov (Labor)	Margaret Guilfoyle (Liberal)	Robert Ray (Labor)	Jim Short (Liberal)	Barney Cooney (Labor)
1987–1990	1987	Janet Powell (Democrat /Independent)	David Hamer (Liberal)	Kay Patterson (Liberal)	John Button (Labor)	Richard Alston (Liberal)	Gareth Evans (Labor)	Austin Lewis (Liberal)	Olive Zakharov (Labor)	Julian McGauran (National)	Robert Ray (Labor)	Jim Short (Liberal)	Barney Cooney (Labor)
1990–1993	1990	Janet Powell (Democrat /Independent)	Rod Kemp (Liberal)	Kay Patterson (Liberal)	John Button (Labor)	Richard Alston (Liberal)	Gareth Evans (Labor)	Austin Lewis (Liberal)	Olive Zakharov (Labor)	Sid Spindler (Democrat)	Robert Ray (Labor)	Jim Short (Liberal)	Barney Cooney (Labor)
1990–1993	1992	Janet Powell (Democrat /Independent)	Rod Kemp (Liberal)	Kay Patterson (Liberal)	John Button (Labor)	Richard Alston (Liberal)	Gareth Evans (Labor)	Austin Lewis (Liberal)	Olive Zakharov (Labor)	Sid Spindler (Democrat)	Robert Ray (Labor)	Jim Short (Liberal)	Barney Cooney (Labor)
1990–1993	1993	Janet Powell (Democrat /Independent)	Rod Kemp (Liberal)	Kay Patterson (Liberal)	Kim Carr (Labor)	Richard Alston (Liberal)	Gareth Evans (Labor)	Austin Lewis (Liberal)	Olive Zakharov (Labor)	Sid Spindler (Democrat)	Robert Ray (Labor)	Jim Short (Liberal)	Barney Cooney (Labor)
1993–1996	1993	Julian McGauran (National)	Rod Kemp (Liberal)	Kay Patterson (Liberal)	Kim Carr (Labor)	Richard Alston (Liberal)	Gareth Evans (Labor)	Judith Troeth (Liberal)	Olive Zakharov (Labor)	Sid Spindler (Democrat)	Robert Ray (Labor)	Jim Short (Liberal)	Barney Cooney (Labor)
1993–1996	1995	Julian McGauran (National)	Rod Kemp (Liberal)	Kay Patterson (Liberal)	Kim Carr (Labor)	Richard Alston (Liberal)	Gareth Evans (Labor)	Judith Troeth (Liberal)	Jacinta Collins (Labor)	Sid Spindler (Democrat)	Robert Ray (Labor)	Jim Short (Liberal)	Barney Cooney (Labor)
1993–1996	1996	Julian McGauran (National)	Rod Kemp (Liberal)	Kay Patterson (Liberal)	Kim Carr (Labor)	Richard Alston (Liberal)	Stephen Conroy (Labor)	Judith Troeth (Liberal)	Jacinta Collins (Labor)	Sid Spindler (Democrat)	Robert Ray (Labor)	Jim Short (Liberal)	Barney Cooney (Labor)
1996–1999	1996	Julian McGauran (National)	Rod Kemp (Liberal)	Kay Patterson (Liberal)	Kim Carr (Labor)	Richard Alston (Liberal)	Stephen Conroy (Labor)	Judith Troeth (Liberal)	Jacinta Collins (Labor)	Lyn Allison (Democrat)	Robert Ray (Labor)	Jim Short (Liberal)	Barney Cooney (Labor)
1996–1999	1997	Julian McGauran (National)	Rod Kemp (Liberal)	Kay Patterson (Liberal)	Kim Carr (Labor)	Richard Alston (Liberal)	Stephen Conroy (Labor)	Judith Troeth (Liberal)	Jacinta Collins (Labor)	Lyn Allison (Democrat)	Robert Ray (Labor)	Karen Synon (Liberal)	Barney Cooney (Labor)
1999–2002	1998	Julian McGauran (National)	Rod Kemp (Liberal)	Kay Patterson (Liberal)	Kim Carr (Labor)	Richard Alston (Liberal)	Stephen Conroy (Labor)	Judith Troeth (Liberal)	Jacinta Collins (Labor)	Lyn Allison (Democrat)	Robert Ray (Labor)	Tsebin Tchen (Liberal)	Barney Cooney (Labor)
2002–2005	2001	Julian McGauran (National)	Rod Kemp (Liberal)	Kay Patterson (Liberal)	Kim Carr (Labor)	Richard Alston (Liberal)	Stephen Conroy (Labor)	Judith Troeth (Liberal)	Jacinta Collins (Labor)	Lyn Allison (Democrat)	Robert Ray (Labor)	Tsebin Tchen (Liberal)	Gavin Marshall (Labor)
2002–2005	2004	Julian McGauran (National)	Rod Kemp (Liberal)	Kay Patterson (Liberal)	Kim Carr (Labor)	Mitch Fifield (Liberal)	Stephen Conroy (Labor)	Judith Troeth (Liberal)	Jacinta Collins (Labor)	Lyn Allison (Democrat)	Robert Ray (Labor)	Tsebin Tchen (Liberal)	Gavin Marshall (Labor)
2005–2008	2004	Julian McGauran (National)	Rod Kemp (Liberal)	Kay Patterson (Liberal)	Kim Carr (Labor)	Mitch Fifield (Liberal)	Stephen Conroy (Labor)	Judith Troeth (Liberal)	Steve Fielding (Family First)	Lyn Allison (Democrat)	Robert Ray (Labor)	Michael Ronaldson (Liberal)	Gavin Marshall (Labor)
2005–2008	2008	Julian McGauran (National)	Rod Kemp (Liberal)	Kay Patterson (Liberal)	Kim Carr (Labor)	Mitch Fifield (Liberal)	Stephen Conroy (Labor)	Judith Troeth (Liberal)	Steve Fielding (Family First)	Lyn Allison (Democrat)	Jacinta Collins (Labor)	Michael Ronaldson (Liberal)	Gavin Marshall (Labor)
2008–2011	2007	Julian McGauran (National)	Helen Kroger (Liberal)	Scott Ryan (Liberal)	Kim Carr (Labor)	Mitch Fifield (Liberal)	Stephen Conroy (Labor)	Judith Troeth (Liberal)	Steve Fielding (Family First)	David Feeney (Labor)	Jacinta Collins (Labor)	Michael Ronaldson (Liberal)	Gavin Marshall (Labor)
2011–2014	2010	Bridget McKenzie (National)	Helen Kroger (Liberal)	Scott Ryan (Liberal)	Kim Carr (Labor)	Mitch Fifield (Liberal)	Stephen Conroy (Labor)	John Madigan (DLP/ Independent/ Madigan's)	Richard Di Natale (Greens)	David Feeney (Labor)	Jacinta Collins (Labor)	Michael Ronaldson (Liberal)	Gavin Marshall (Labor)
2011–2014	2013	Bridget McKenzie (National)	Helen Kroger (Liberal)	Scott Ryan (Liberal)	Kim Carr (Labor)	Mitch Fifield (Liberal)	Stephen Conroy (Labor)	John Madigan (DLP/ Independent/ Madigan's)	Richard Di Natale (Greens)	Mehmet Tillem (Labor)	Jacinta Collins (Labor)	Michael Ronaldson (Liberal)	Gavin Marshall (Labor)
2014–2016	2013	Bridget McKenzie (National)	Janet Rice (Greens)	Scott Ryan (Liberal)	Kim Carr (Labor)	Mitch Fifield (Liberal)	Stephen Conroy (Labor)	John Madigan (DLP/ Independent/ Madigan's)	Richard Di Natale (Greens)	Ricky Muir (Motoring Enthusiast)	Jacinta Collins (Labor)	Michael Ronaldson (Liberal)	Gavin Marshall (Labor)
2014–2016	2014	Bridget McKenzie (National)	Janet Rice (Greens)	Scott Ryan (Liberal)	Kim Carr (Labor)	Mitch Fifield (Liberal)	Stephen Conroy (Labor)	John Madigan (DLP/ Independent/ Madigan's)	Richard Di Natale (Greens)	Ricky Muir (Motoring Enthusiast)	Jacinta Collins (Labor)	Michael Ronaldson (Liberal)	Gavin Marshall (Labor)
2014–2016	2015	Bridget McKenzie (National)	Janet Rice (Greens)	Scott Ryan (Liberal)	Kim Carr (Labor)	Mitch Fifield (Liberal)	Stephen Conroy (Labor)	John Madigan (DLP/ Independent/ Madigan's)	Richard Di Natale (Greens)	Ricky Muir (Motoring Enthusiast)	Jacinta Collins (Labor)	Michael Ronaldson (Liberal)	Gavin Marshall (Labor)
2014–2016	2016	Bridget McKenzie (National)	Janet Rice (Greens)	Scott Ryan (Liberal)	Kim Carr (Labor)	Mitch Fifield (Liberal)	Stephen Conroy (Labor)	John Madigan (DLP/ Independent/ Madigan's)	Richard Di Natale (Greens)	Ricky Muir (Motoring Enthusiast)	Jacinta Collins (Labor)	James Paterson (Liberal)	Gavin Marshall (Labor)
2016–2019	2016	Bridget McKenzie (National)	Janet Rice (Greens)	Scott Ryan (Liberal)	Kim Carr (Labor)	Mitch Fifield (Liberal)	Stephen Conroy (Labor)	Derryn Hinch (Justice)	Richard Di Natale (Greens)	Jane Hume (Liberal)	Jacinta Collins (Labor)	James Paterson (Liberal)	Gavin Marshall (Labor)
2016–2019	2016	Bridget McKenzie (National)	Janet Rice (Greens)	Scott Ryan (Liberal)	Kim Carr (Labor)	Mitch Fifield (Liberal)	Kimberley Kitching (Labor)	Derryn Hinch (Justice)	Richard Di Natale (Greens)	Jane Hume (Liberal)	Jacinta Collins (Labor)	James Paterson (Liberal)	Gavin Marshall (Labor)
2016–2019	2019	Bridget McKenzie (National)	Janet Rice (Greens)	Scott Ryan (Liberal)	Kim Carr (Labor)	Mitch Fifield (Liberal)	Kimberley Kitching (Labor)	Derryn Hinch (Justice)	Richard Di Natale (Greens)	Jane Hume (Liberal)	Raff Ciccone (Labor)	James Paterson (Liberal)	Gavin Marshall (Labor)
2019–2022	2019	Bridget McKenzie (National)	Janet Rice (Greens)	Scott Ryan (Liberal)	Kim Carr (Labor)	Mitch Fifield (Liberal)	Kimberley Kitching (Labor)	David Van (Liberal/ Independent)	Richard Di Natale (Greens)	Jane Hume (Liberal)	Raff Ciccone (Labor)	James Paterson (Liberal)	Jess Walsh (Labor)
2019–2022	2019	Bridget McKenzie (National)	Janet Rice (Greens)	Scott Ryan (Liberal)	Kim Carr (Labor)	Sarah Henderson (Liberal)	Kimberley Kitching (Labor)	David Van (Liberal/ Independent)	Richard Di Natale (Greens)	Jane Hume (Liberal)	Raff Ciccone (Labor)	James Paterson (Liberal)	Jess Walsh (Labor)
2019–2022	2020	Bridget McKenzie (National)	Janet Rice (Greens)	Scott Ryan (Liberal)	Kim Carr (Labor)	Sarah Henderson (Liberal)	Kimberley Kitching (Labor)	David Van (Liberal/ Independent)	Lidia Thorpe (Greens/ Independent)	Jane Hume (Liberal)	Raff Ciccone (Labor)	James Paterson (Liberal)	Jess Walsh (Labor)
2019–2022	2021	Bridget McKenzie (National)	Janet Rice (Greens)	Greg Mirabella (Liberal)	Kim Carr (Labor)	Sarah Henderson (Liberal)	Kimberley Kitching (Labor)	David Van (Liberal/ Independent)	Lidia Thorpe (Greens/ Independent)	Jane Hume (Liberal)	Raff Ciccone (Labor)	James Paterson (Liberal)	Jess Walsh (Labor)
2019–2022	2022	Bridget McKenzie (National)	Janet Rice (Greens)	Greg Mirabella (Liberal)	Kim Carr (Labor)	Sarah Henderson (Liberal)	Jana Stewart (Labor)	David Van (Liberal/ Independent)	Lidia Thorpe (Greens/ Independent)	Jane Hume (Liberal)	Raff Ciccone (Labor)	James Paterson (Liberal)	Jess Walsh (Labor)
2022–2025	2022	Bridget McKenzie (National)	Janet Rice (Greens)	Ralph Babet (UAP)	Linda White (Labor)	Sarah Henderson (Liberal)	Jana Stewart (Labor)	David Van (Liberal/ Independent)	Lidia Thorpe (Greens/ Independent)	Jane Hume (Liberal)	Raff Ciccone (Labor)	James Paterson (Liberal)	Jess Walsh (Labor)
2022–2025	2023	Bridget McKenzie (National)	Janet Rice (Greens)	Ralph Babet (UAP)	Linda White (Labor)	Sarah Henderson (Liberal)	Jana Stewart (Labor)	David Van (Liberal/ Independent)	Lidia Thorpe (Greens/ Independent)	Jane Hume (Liberal)	Raff Ciccone (Labor)	James Paterson (Liberal)	Jess Walsh (Labor)
2022–2025	2024	Bridget McKenzie (National)	Steph Hodgins-May (Greens)	Ralph Babet (UAP)	Lisa Darmanin (Labor)	Sarah Henderson (Liberal)	Jana Stewart (Labor)	David Van (Liberal/ Independent)	Lidia Thorpe (Greens/ Independent)	Jane Hume (Liberal)	Raff Ciccone (Labor)	James Paterson (Liberal)	Jess Walsh (Labor)
2025–2028	2025	Bridget McKenzie (National)	Steph Hodgins-May (Greens)	Ralph Babet (UAP)	Lisa Darmanin (Labor)	Sarah Henderson (Liberal)	Jana Stewart (Labor)	Michelle Ananda-Rajah (Labor)	Lidia Thorpe (Greens/ Independent)	Jane Hume (Liberal)	Raff Ciccone (Labor)	James Paterson (Liberal)	Jess Walsh (Labor)

== See also ==
- Electoral results for the Australian Senate in Victoria
