= Department of Science =

Department of Science may refer to:

- Department of Science (1972–75), an Australian government department
- Department of Science (1975–78), an Australian government department
- Department of Science (1984–87), an Australian government department

== See also ==
- Department of Science and Technology (disambiguation)
