= Bob Cotton =

Australian politician and diplomat

The Honourable Sir Robert Cotton KCMG, AO
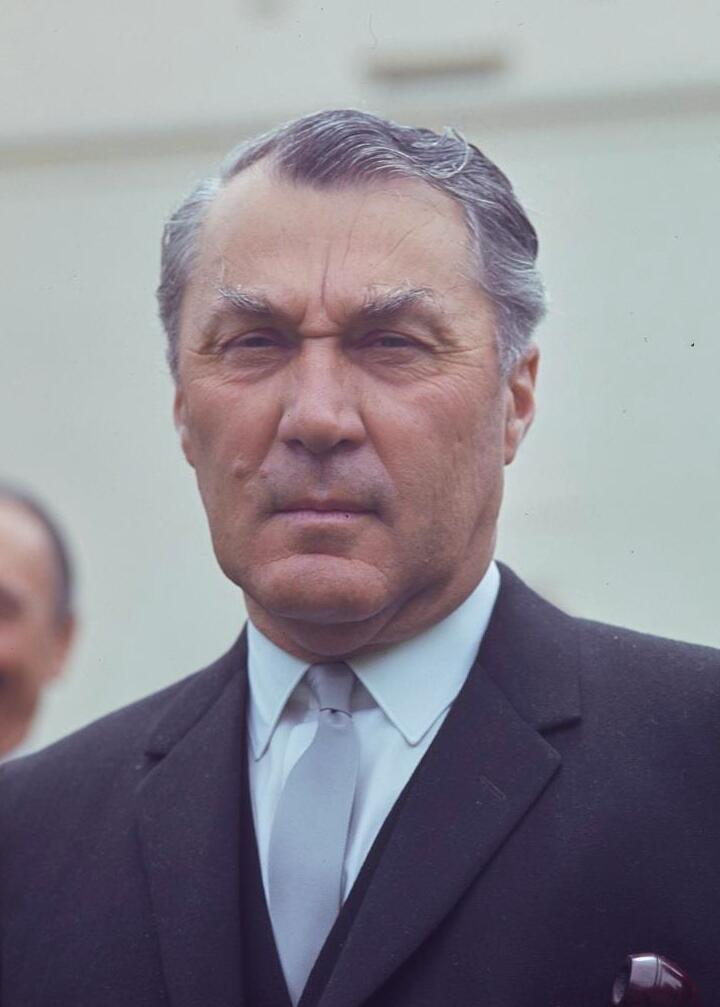

Minister for Industry and Commerce
- In office 11 November 1975 – 20 December 1977
- Prime Minister: Malcolm Fraser
- Preceded by: Lionel Bowen (Manufacturing Industry)
- Succeeded by: Phillip Lynch

Minister for Science and Consumer Affairs
- In office 11 November 1975 – 22 December 1975
- Prime Minister: Malcolm Fraser
- Preceded by: Clyde Cameron
- Succeeded by: James Webster (Science)

Minister for Civil Aviation
- In office 12 November 1969 – 2 December 1972
- Prime Minister: John Gorton; William McMahon
- Preceded by: Reg Swartz
- Succeeded by: Charles Jones

Senator for New South Wales
- In office 4 August 1965 – 13 July 1978
- Preceded by: Sir William Spooner
- Succeeded by: Chris Puplick

16th Ambassador of Australia to the United States
- In office 16 August 1982 – 1 June 1985
- Preceded by: Geoffrey J. Price (Chargé d'affaires)
- Succeeded by: Rawdon Dalrymple

Personal details
- Born: 29 November 1915 Broken Hill, New South Wales, Australia
- Died: 25 December 2006 (aged 91) Sydney, New South Wales, Australia
- Party: Liberal
- Occupation: Businessman, pastoralist

Sir Robert Carrington Cotton, KCMG, AO (29 November 1915 – 25 December 2006) was an Australian politician and diplomat. He was a member of the Liberal Party and served as a Senator for New South Wales from 1966 to 1978. He held ministerial office as Minister for Civil Aviation (1969–1972), Science and Consumer Affairs (1975), and Industry and Commerce (1975–1977). He later served as Consul-General in New York (1978–1982) and Ambassador to the United States (1982–1985).

== Early life ==
Cotton was born on 29 November 1915 in Broken Hill, New South Wales. He was the first of seven children born to Muriel Florence (née Pearce) and Hugh Leslie Carrington Cotton. His father ran a mercantile agency in Broken Hill.

Cotton began his education in Broken Hill at Burke Ward Public School. He completed his secondary education as a boarder at St Peter's College, Adelaide, from 1929 to 1932. He won a scholarship to study agricultural science but his family was unable to afford to send him to university during the Great Depression.

Cotton trained as a Royal Australian Air Force pilot in 1942 and 1943, but did not participate in action in World War II as he was seconded to the Department of Supply. Instead Cotton established the timber industry in Oberon, New South Wales as a wartime priority.

After the war Cotton became a businessman and pastoralist in Oberon. In 1949 and 1950 he was President of Oberon Shire Council.

== Politics ==
Cotton was a member of the Liberal Party of Australia from its foundation, and in the 1949 federal election he ran unsuccessfully for the seat of Macquarie against the sitting Australian Labor Party member, Prime Minister Ben Chifley. He again lost to Chifley, now Leader of the Opposition, in 1951.

From 1957 to 1960 he was New South Wales State President of the Liberal Party.

=== Senate ===
Cotton was appointed to the Senate to fill a vacancy caused by the resignation of Sir William Spooner in August 1965. The Australian Constitution dictated that a special Senate election had to be held at the same time as the lower house 1966 election, but Cotton was re-elected. He was re-elected in 1967, 1974 and 1975. He was Minister for Civil Aviation from 1969 to 1972, responsible for the Department of Civil Aviation. During Cotton's term as Minister, the Department introduced security legislations to exclude non-passengers from international airport departure terminals. Cotton was Minister for Industry and Commerce from 1975 to 1977.

== Later life ==
Cotton retired from Parliament in 1978. He was Australian Consul-General in New York from 1978 to 1981. He was a director of the Reserve Bank of Australia in 1981 and 1982 and was the Australian Ambassador to the United States from 1982 to 1985, and from 1991 to 1994 he was Chairman of the Australian National Gallery Foundation.

He died on Christmas Day 2006 in Sydney aged 91 after a long illness. He was survived by his second wife, two daughters and a son, three stepchildren, seven grandchildren, four great-grandchildren and a sister.

== Honours ==
Cotton was knighted (KCMG) in 1978 and was made an Officer of the Order of Australia (AO) in 1993. He received a Doctorate of Science from the University of Sydney in 1995.

Political offices
| Preceded by Reginald Swartz | Minister for Civil Aviation; 1969–1972 | Succeeded by Gough Whitlam |
| Preceded by Clyde Cameron | Minister for Science and Consumer Affairs; 1975 | Succeeded by James Webster |
| Preceded by Lionel Bowen | Minister for Industry and Commerce; 1975–1977 | Succeeded by Phillip Lynch |
Diplomatic posts
| Preceded by Peter Barbour | Australian Consul General in New York; 1978–1982 | Succeeded by Denis Cordner |
| Preceded by Nick Parkinson | Australian Ambassador to the United States; 1982–1985 | Succeeded by Rawdon Dalrymple |
