= Ennor =

Ennor can refer to

- Ennor, one of the alternative names for J. R. R. Tolkien's fictional lands of Middle-earth
- Ennor, the name of the single larger island off Cornwall which gave rise to what are now the Isles of Scilly as sea levels rose in early mediaeval times
- Hugh Ennor (1912–1977), senior Australian public servant
