= Ian Macphee =

Australian politician

The Honourable Ian Macphee AO
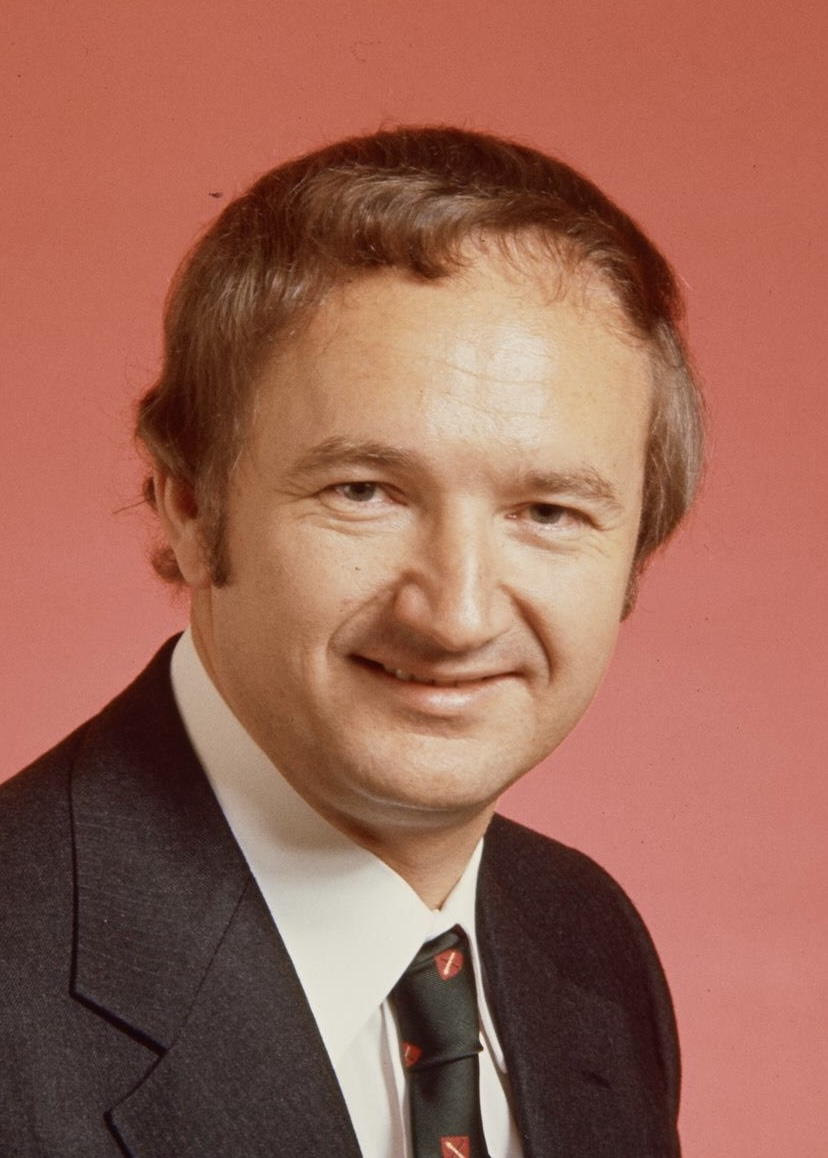
- Official portrait, 1974

Minister for Employment and Youth Affairs
- In office 7 May 1982 – 11 March 1983
- Prime Minister: Malcolm Fraser
- Preceded by: Neil Brown
- Succeeded by: Ralph Willis

Minister for Immigration and Ethnic Affairs
- In office 8 December 1979 – 7 May 1982
- Prime Minister: Malcolm Fraser
- Preceded by: Michael MacKellar
- Succeeded by: John Hodges

Minister for Productivity
- In office 8 November 1976 – 8 December 1979
- Prime Minister: Malcolm Fraser
- Preceded by: New title
- Succeeded by: Kevin Newman

Member of the Australian Parliament for Goldstein
- In office 1 December 1984 – 19 February 1990
- Preceded by: New seat
- Succeeded by: David Kemp

Member of the Australian Parliament for Balaclava
- In office 18 May 1974 – 1 December 1984
- Preceded by: Ray Whittorn
- Succeeded by: Seat abolished

Personal details
- Born: 13 July 1938 (age 88) Sydney, New South Wales, Australia
- Party: Liberal
- Education: University of Sydney; University of Hawaii
- Occupation: Lawyer

Ian Malcolm Macphee AO (born 13 July 1938) is an Australian former politician. He held ministerial office in the Fraser government as Minister for Productivity (1976–1979), Immigration and Ethnic Affairs (1979–1982), and Minister for Employment and Youth Affairs (1982–1983). He was a member of the House of Representatives from 1974 to 1990, representing the Liberal Party. He was known for his contributions in developing Australian multiculturalism as immigration minister and for being one of the most prominent "small-l" liberals within the Liberal Party.

== Early years ==
Macphee was born in Sydney on 13 July 1938. His father was an electrical engineer who served with the Royal Australian Navy during World War II and later worked at the steelworks in Whyalla, South Australia.

Macphee was raised in the Sydney suburb of Neutral Bay, attending Neutral Bay Public School and North Sydney Technical College. After leaving school he worked as a clerk in the state Public Solicitor's Office while studying law part-time. He eventually graduated Bachelor of Laws from the University of Sydney. Macphee subsequently moved to the Territory of Papua and New Guinea and joined the territorial administration's Public Solicitor's Office. In that capacity he represented Papua New Guinean trade unions in local wage-setting negotiations. He also wrote opinion pieces for The Bulletin and Pacific Islands Monthly on local affairs and Australia's role in the lead-up to Papua New Guinea's independence in 1975.

After winning an East–West Center scholarship, Macphee moved to the United States to undertake further studies for two years. He spent time at Yale University and the University of Hawaii, graduating Master of Arts from the latter with a thesis on South-East Asian history and politics. He returned to Australia in 1968 and joined the New South Wales Chamber of Manufactures as an assistant director. He later moved to Melbourne and became director of the Victorian Chamber of Manufactures. He also served on the Victorian Committee on Discrimination in Employment and Occupation.

== Early political involvement ==
Macphee unsuccessfully sought Liberal preselection for the New South Wales seat of Berowra prior to the 1969 election, losing to Tom Hughes. He was president of the Liberal Party's Roseville East branch from 1970 to 1971. After moving to Victoria he served as chairman of the state party's manufacturing advisory committee from 1971 to 1973.

In March 1974, Macphee was preselected as the Liberal candidate for the safe seat of Balaclava, defeating 23 other candidates following the retirement of the incumbent MP Ray Whittorn. He retained Balaclava for the Liberal Party at the 1974 federal election.

Macphee was elevated to the second Fraser ministry following a ministerial reshuffle in November 1976, assuming the new portfolio of Minister for Productivity. He was also appointed Minister Assisting the Minister for Employment and Industrial Relations and replaced Tony Street as Minister Assisting the Prime Minister in Women's Affairs. He received a broad mandate to deal with matters and policy affecting industrial productivity, although the creation of the new Department of Productivity was met with criticism from some who felt its responsibilities overlapped with existing departments. He spoke favourably on the recommendations of the Jackson Committee and said existing protectionist policies would need to be reviewed to produce "an internationally competitive, export-oriented manufacturing industry".

== Immigration minister ==
After three years in the productivity portfolio, Macphee replaced Michael MacKellar as the Minister for Immigration and Ethnic Affairs. Fraser and MacKellar had already adopted the recommendations of the Galbally report, which led to a new framework for migrant settlement. Macphee, with the full support of Fraser, continued the pace of reform, allowing large numbers of Indochinese refugees into Australia and he also introduced a family reunion scheme for these refugees. Macphee was assisted by receiving full bipartisan support from the shadow Immigration Minister Mick Young.

In the 1980 and the 1983 elections, Macphee retained his seat, defeating Labor candidate Chris Kennedy. Macphee helped oversee the introduction of the Special Broadcasting Service. He played an important role in the opening of the Australian Institute of Multicultural Affairs and he worked with the institute's director, Petro Georgiou, in overseeing government policy in this area.

Macphee later described his time as Immigration Minister as the most "exciting...[and] absolutely enriching" time during his period in parliament.

Macphee became a Cabinet minister in May 1982 when Fraser promoted him to Minister for Employment and Youth Affairs. Macphee defended the role of compulsory arbitration as a means to protect wages in spite of pressure from the more conservative elements within the party, and held this post until the Fraser Government was defeated in March 1983.

== In opposition ==
Upon this defeat, the Liberal Party became badly divided between the moderate (wet) and the conservative (dry) forces within the party. Macphee, as one of the party's leading moderates, became a strong supporter of Andrew Peacock, who defeated John Howard for the leadership of the party. Macphee remained in Shadow Cabinet, continuing as shadow Minister for Employment and Industrial Relations before he was given the job of shadow Minister for Foreign Affairs after the 1984 election. At this election, Macphee transferred to the newly created Division of Goldstein, essentially a reconfigured version of Balaclava.

In 1985 Howard successfully challenged for the leadership. Macphee stood for the deputy leadership that Howard had vacated, finishing runner-up to Neil Brown with 15 votes out of 70. Howard kept Macphee in the Shadow Cabinet, although he became Shadow Minister for Communications rather than retain his more prestigious former portfolio. Macphee kept this position until April 1987 when Howard sacked him.

In 1988 Howard commented that immigration from Asia should be slowed down. This position attracted criticism from the Labor Party but also many of his colleagues in the Liberal Party, especially from those who had implemented multicultural policies under Fraser. In order to expose Liberal divisions on the issue, Prime Minister Bob Hawke moved a motion in Parliament that race or ethnic origin should never be a criterion for becoming an immigrant to Australia. Macphee was one of the several Liberals who crossed the floor to support the motion and he received support from prominent Liberal Party politicians such as Nick Greiner and Jeff Kennett for his stand.

== Preselection challenge ==
Early in the following year, Macphee lost Liberal preselection in Goldstein—the real contest in what was then a safe Liberal seat—to academic David Kemp. This challenge was portrayed in the media as a "wet" versus "dry" battle, although some commentators, such as Gerard Henderson, argued that Macphee had simply lost the support of the Liberal members in his electorate. Macphee blamed his loss on his decision to oppose Howard's position on Asian immigration. This event further crippled an already divided party and contributed to Howard losing the leadership back to Peacock in May 1989.

With the next election not due until 1990, Macphee briefly returned to Shadow Cabinet under Peacock, again serving as shadow Minister for Foreign Affairs. He returned to the backbench until retiring prior to the 1990 election.

== After politics ==
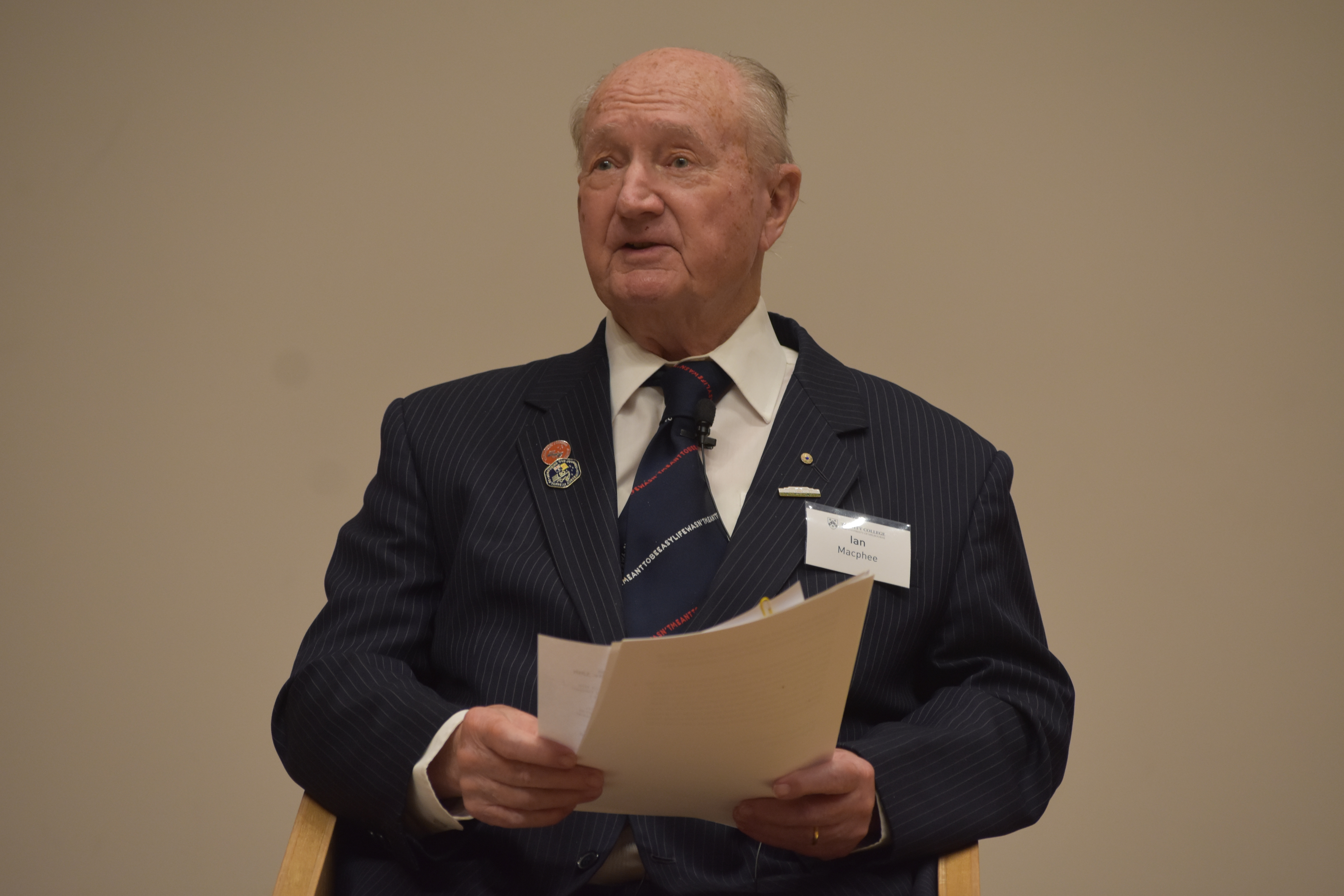
Macphee in 2025 at Trinity College

Macphee remained in public life. He served on the board of CARE Australia and from 1994 he served as a director of the Australian Broadcasting Corporation for a period of five years. Macphee also worked with fellow former Liberal MP Alan Hunt in reforming the Victorian Legislative Council in a Constitutional Commission set up by the Bracks Labor Government.

On 26 January 1992, he was appointed an Officer of the Order of Australia (AO) for "service to the Australian parliament".

He conducted an independent review of a tender evaluation process undertaken by the Civil Aviation Authority (CAA), which reported in December 1992. The CAA's tender process was found to have been "in significant respects unsound and unfair".

Macphee, given his history with Howard, was critical of the Howard Government, stating that he was "consistently outraged" by the Government's position on refugee policy. He also publicly supported the 2005 "backbench revolt" of Petro Georgiou, Judi Moylan, Bruce Baird and Russell Broadbent, which saw the softening of some aspects of the legislation.

Macphee was also highly critical of the Howard Government's role in the 2003 invasion of Iraq.

In 2017 speaking as a former immigration minister, Macphee criticised the powers held by current Immigration Minister Peter Dutton as "unchecked and unjust."

In 2020, in response to a push from a local group, Voices of Goldstein, Macphee endorsed the push for an independent candidate in his old seat of Goldstein, saying "the Liberal party branches are now controlled by the Liberal party head office, which does not listen to ordinary voters... that's the state we've got to in our democracy which has been abused by power hungry people."

Political offices
New title	Minister for Productivity; 1976–1979	Succeeded by Kevin Newman
Preceded by Michael MacKellar	Minister for Immigration and Ethnic Affairs; 1979–1982	Succeeded by John Hodges
Preceded by Neil Brown	Minister for Employment and Youth Affairs; 1982–1983	Succeeded by Ralph Willis
Parliament of Australia
Preceded by Ray Whittorn	Member for Balaclava; 1974–1984	Division abolished
Division created	Member for Goldstein; 1984–1990	Succeeded by David Kemp
