= Bert Hendrickson =

Australian politician

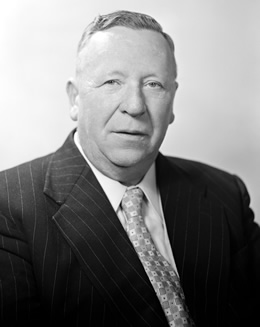
- Hendrickson in 1956

Senator for Victoria
- In office 1 July 1947 – 30 June 1971

Personal details
- Born: 18 December 1897 Adelaide Lead, Victoria, Australia
- Died: 28 April 1977 (aged 79) Melbourne, Victoria, Australia
- Party: Labor
- Spouse: Eunice Matthews (m. 1919)
- Occupation: Public servant

Albion "Bert" Hendrickson (18 December 1897 – 28 April 1977) was an Australian politician. He was a member of the Australian Labor Party (ALP) and served as a Senator for Victoria from 1947 to 1971. He was a backbencher for the duration of his Senate service. He was a World War I veteran and worked for the Postmaster-General's Department before entering parliament.

== Early life ==
Hendrickson was born on 18 December 1897 in Adelaide Lead, Victoria. He was the son of Mary (née Broad) and Peter Hendrickson; his father was a miner.

Hendrickson spent his early years in Maryborough and attended the local state school. After leaving school he worked for Victorian Railways as a porter. He enlisted in the Australian Imperial Force in July 1915 and joined the 22nd Battalion. He transferred to the 2nd Pioneer Battalion in March 1916 and served in France, where he was wounded in action in May 1917. He was hospitalised for a period in England and returned to Australia in December 1917, receiving a medical discharge in March 1918.

After the war, Hendrickson undertook vocational training under a scheme for returend servicemen. He joined the Postmaster-General's Department and worked as a linesman for a period based in Maryborough. He moved to Bendigo in the early 1930s. Hendrickson was an official in the Amalgamated Postal Workers' Union. He served as president of the Bendigo Trades Hall Council for a period.

== Politics ==
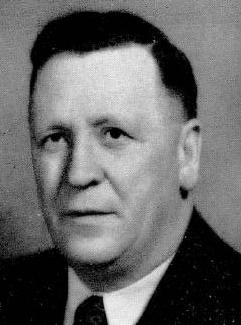
Hendrickson early in his Senate career

Hendrickson joined the ALP at a young age and became president of its Bendigo branch. He first stood for parliament at the 1940 federal election, running unsuccessfully in the third position on Labor's Senate ticket in Victoria. In April 1946, he was preselected as the ALP's nominee for the casual vacancy caused by the death of ALP senator Richard Keane. He was defeated for the vacancy by Country Party nominee Alexander Fraser, as the ALP did not have a majority in the Victorian parliament.

At the 1946 election, Hendrickson was elected to a six-year Senate term beginning on 1 July 1947. Although he had moved to Melbourne in the early 1940s, his campaign focused on country areas and emphasised his connections with Maryborough, including his "earlier associations with the town and his sympathies with its rural community". Hendrickson's first term was cut short by a double dissolution and he was assigned a shorter three-year term following re-election at the 1951 election. He was later re-elected to further six-year terms at the 1953, 1958, and 1964 elections, retiring upon the expiry of his term on 30 June 1971.

In 1962, Hendrickson was suspended from parliament for a sitting day after refusing to withdraw a remark implying Liberal senator George Hannan was an antisemite. His ALP colleague Sam Cohen, the only Jewish senator at the time, had accused Hannan of initiating a debate on antisemitism in the Soviet Union in order to embarrass him. Cohen observed that "modern antisemitism started with Hitler", to which Hendrickson added "[...] which Senator Hannan supports". In 1969, Hendrickson collapsed while attending Cohen's state funeral. He was briefly hospitalised and the collapse was attributed to "emotional stress", attracting attention as Cohen's fatal heart attack had occurred in similar circumstances at a public event.

After the retirement of Walter Cooper in 1968, Hendrickson and two colleagues also elected in 1946 – Justin O'Byrne and Annabelle Rankin – became the senators with the longest continuous service, sometimes accorded the title "Father of the Senate".

=== Views and positions ===
In his first term, Hendrickson strongly supported the Chifley government's attempts to nationalise the private banking industry. He spoke on a wide range of topics including "repatriation, land settlement for ex-servicemen, war service homes, social services, the cost of living, unemployment, and the Snowy Mountains Hydro-electric Scheme, as well as trade and international affairs". Hendrickson visited the Soviet Union in 1969 and was honoured at a luncheon hosted by the Leningrad City Soviet, although he was regarded as "genuinely anti-communist". He was strongly opposed to the European Common Market, regarding it as a major barrier to Australian agricultural exports.

Hendrickson opposed Australian involvement in the Vietnam War, regarding it as an "unjust and immoral war". In 1967 he publicly opposed suggestions from ALP deputy leader Lance Barnard that the party should revise its position on Vietnam, stating that a Labor government should withdraw Australian troops and that "the preponderance of evil in the war is clearly on the American side". In 1970, Hendrickson and three of his Labor colleagues – Jim Cairns, Moss Cass and Arthur Poyser – were threatened with prosecution over statements attributed to them supporting draft evasion. Hendrickson advised police that he had not authorised use of his name and no charges were laid.

== Personal life ==
In 1919, Hendrickson married Eunice Matthews, with whom he had four children. He died in Melbourne on 28 April 1977, having been predeceased by one of his children.
