= Department of Productivity =

Australian government department, 1976–1980

Department overview
- Formed: 8 November 1976
- Preceding Department: Department of Transport (III) - for materials handling Department of Business and Consumer Affairs - for patents of inventions and designs and trade marks Department of Employment and Industrial Relations (I) - for working environment, productivity promotion and national training policy Department of Industry and Commerce (I) - for efficiency and development of manufacturing and tertiary industries; and manufacture of goods and provision of services for defence purposes
- Dissolved: 3 November 1980
- Superseding Department: Department of Science and Technology
- Jurisdiction: Commonwealth of Australia
- Headquarters: Canberra
- Ministers responsible: Ian Macphee, Minister (1976‑79); Kevin Newman, Minister (1979‑80)
- Department executives: D.J. O'Connor, Acting Secretary (1976‑77); Alan Cooley, Secretary (1977‑80); Hugh Ryan, Acting Secretary (1979‑80); D. Eltringham, Secretary (1980)

The Department of Productivity was an Australian government department with the mission to providing increased industrial productivity. The department existed between November 1976 and November 1980, operating under the Fraser government.

== History ==
The establishment of the Department of Productivity was announced by Malcolm Fraser in November 1976, a new initiative taken to provide a technologically oriented agency with the responsibility of providing increased industrial productivity.

The Department of Productivity was abolished in November 1980 when the Fraser government joined the department together with the Department of Science and the Environment to form the Department of Science and Technology, having received advice from the Australian Science and Technology Council that there would be merit in merging the two departments.

== Outcomes and scope ==
The Department's mission was to provide increased industrial productivity.

Information about the department's functions and government funding allocation could be found in the Administrative Arrangements Orders, the annual Portfolio Budget Statements and in the department's annual reports.

At its creation, the Department dealt with:

- Productivity of industry
- Industrial training policy
- Patents of inventions and designs, and trade marks
- Manufacture of goods and provision of services for defence purposes

== Structure ==
The Department was an Australian Public Service department, staffed by officials responsible to the Minister for Productivity.

== List of ministers ==
#	Name	Party	Start	End	Prime Minister
1	Ian Macphee	Liberal	8 November 1976	8 December 1979	Malcolm Fraser
2	Kevin Newman	Liberal	8 December 1979	3 November 1980	Malcolm Fraser
