= Department of Science and Technology =

Department of Science and Technology may refer to:

- Department of Science and Technology (Australia), an Australian Government department between November 1980 and December 1984
- Department of Science and Technology (India)
- Department of Science and Technology (Philippines)
- Department of Science and Technology (South Africa)

== See also ==
- Department of Science (disambiguation)
- Directorate for Science and Technology (disambiguation)
