= James Webster (Australian politician) =

Australian politician (1925–2022)

The Honourable James Webster
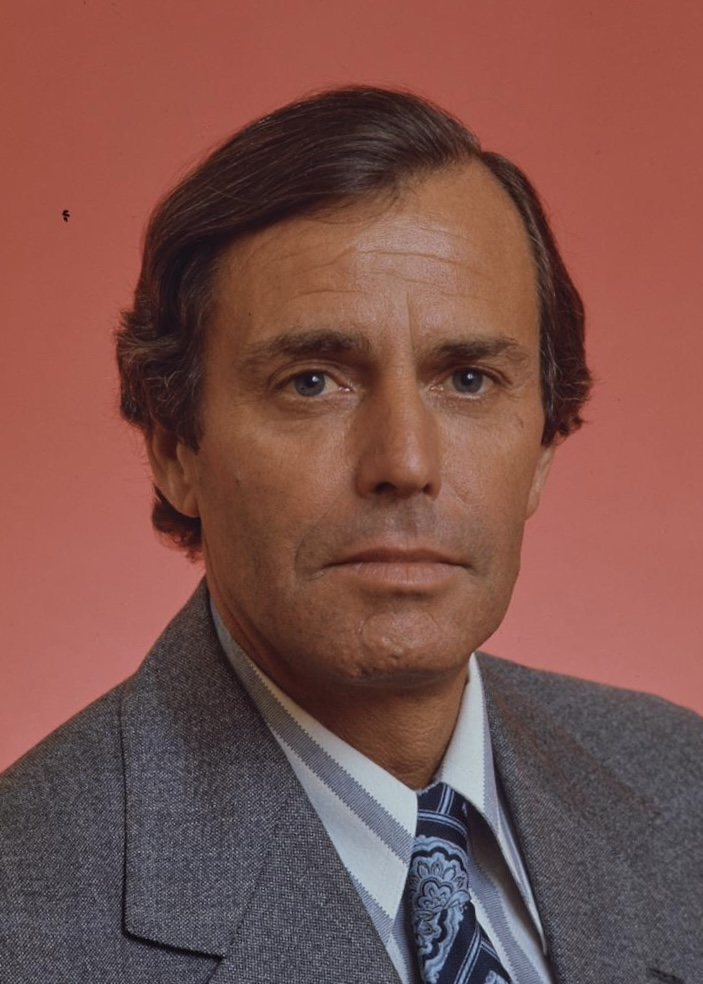
- Webster in 1974

Minister for Science and the Environment
- In office 5 December 1978 – 8 December 1979
- Prime Minister: Malcolm Fraser
- Preceded by: Himself (Science); Ray Groom (Environment)
- Succeeded by: David Thomson

Minister for Science
- In office 22 December 1975 – 5 December 1978
- Prime Minister: Malcolm Fraser
- Preceded by: Bob Cotton
- Succeeded by: Himself (Science and the Environment)

Senator for Victoria
- In office 9 December 1964 – 28 January 1980
- Preceded by: Harrie Wade
- Succeeded by: Laurence Neal

Personal details
- Born: 14 June 1925 Flinders Island, Tasmania, Australia
- Died: 3 April 2022 (aged 96) Brighton, Victoria, Australia
- Party: Country / NCP
- Spouses: Jean Drake (m. 1957–1989) Jeanette Hillis (m. 1993)
- Relations: Leslie Webster (father)
- Occupation: Accountant, farmer

James Joseph Webster (14 June 1925 – 3 April 2022) was an Australian politician. He was a Senator for Victoria from 1964 to 1980, representing the National Country Party (NCP). He served as Minister for Science (1975–1978) and Science and the Environment (1978–1979) in the Fraser government. He left politics to become High Commissioner to New Zealand, serving from 1980 to 1983.

== Early life ==
Webster was born on 14 June 1925 on Flinders Island, Tasmania. He was the youngest of three sons born to Eileen (née Thorne) and Leslie Webster. His father was the chairman of the Flinders Island Butter Factory and served as president of the Flinders Island Municipal Council.

In 1929, Webster and his family moved to his father's home state of Victoria. His father ran a timber and hardware business in Melbourne before settling the family on a farm in Greenval in 1932. Webster was educated at state schools before completing his education at Caulfield Grammar School. During World War II he managed the family farm in the absence of his older brothers, and also joined the Air Training Corps. His father served in state parliament from 1944 to 1947 as a member of the Country Party.

Webster took business classes at the YMCA before studying accounting at Melbourne Technical College. He worked for periods as a clerk at a timber company, as chief clerk at a sawmill in Orbost, and as a tallyman on the Melbourne wharves. He was active in the labour movement as a delegate to the Australian Timber Workers' Union and as a member of the Waterside Workers' Federation. In 1948, he joined J. J. Webster Pty Ltd, the Elsternwick timber, hardware, and plumbing retailer that had been founded by his grandfather in 1884. In 1954, he became a director of Lords Holdings Limited, a building supply wholesaler.

== Politics ==
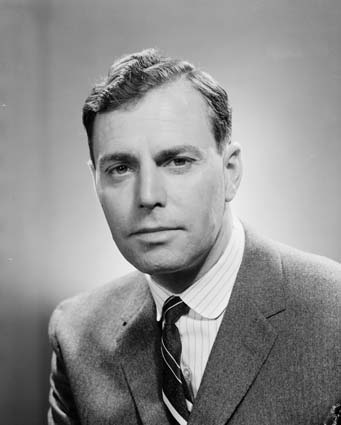
Webster in 1965

Webster joined the Young Country Party in 1940. He was a member of the party's Federal Council (1960–1964) and served as state president of the Victorian Country Party (1963–1964). At the 1955 state election he stood unsuccessfully in the seat of Broadmeadows.

Webster was appointed to the Senate in December 1964, filling a casual vacancy caused by the death of Harrie Wade. He was re-elected in 1966, 1967, 1974, and 1975. Webster was an "active backbencher" and served on a variety of Senate committees. His views were "in many respects, those of a rural socialist", and he supported government subsidies and tax incentives for rural industries. He was also in favour of public funding of the Australian film industry, supporting the establishment of the Australian Film Development Corporation, the Australian Film and Television School, and the Australian Film Commission.

In December 1975, Webster was appointed Minister for Science in the Fraser government. He was also given the environment portfolio in 1978, becoming Minister for Science and the Environment.

In 1979, Webster announced that responsibility for whaling would be moved from the Department of Primary Industry to his own department. He subsequently said that the government would seek to end illegal "pirate" whaling and was "firmly committed to a policy of vigorous and active protection of whales". During his tenure Australia and Seychelles successfully lobbied the International Whaling Commission (IWC) to introduce the Indian Ocean Whale Sanctuary.

In 1975, his constitutional eligibility to sit in the Senate was questioned, prompting the Parliament to introduce the Common Informers (Parliamentary Disqualifications) Act 1975, although ultimately the High Court found that he was not ineligible and he continued to serve until his retirement in 1980.

== Later life ==
In December 1979, it was announced that Webster would retire from politics in order to be appointed High Commissioner to New Zealand. He formally resigned from the Senate in January 1980, and was succeeded by Laurence Neal. Webster served as High Commissioner during the negotiations leading up to the Closer Economic Relations agreement. According to John Menadue, he opposed the Fraser government's 1981 changes to the Trans-Tasman Travel Arrangement, which required New Zealanders to carry passports when entering Australia. His term as High Commissioner ended in October 1983. He subsequently resumed farming in Victoria.

== Personal life and death ==
Webster married Jean Drake in 1957, with whom he had four sons. They were divorced in 1989 and in 1993 he married Jeanette Hillis.

Webster became an elder in the Presbyterian Church of Victoria at the age of 21. He served on the board of the Victorian School for Deaf Children from 1954 to 1974.

Webster died in Brighton, Victoria on 3 April 2022, at the age of 96. His funeral was held at St Leonards Uniting Church on 21 April.

== See also ==
- List of Caulfield Grammar School people

Political offices
Preceded by Bill Morrison	Minister for Science; 1975–1978	Succeeded by David Thomson
Preceded by Ray Groom	Minister for Science and the Environment; 1978–1979	Succeeded by David Thomson
Diplomatic posts
Preceded by Lew Border	Australian High Commissioner to New Zealand; 1980–1984	Succeeded by Les Johnson
