= Harry Rosenberg (biochemist) =

Australian biochemist

Harry Rosenberg (10 November 1923 – 12 May 1995) was a Jewish Australian biochemist, born in Poland, who worked at the Australian National University (ANU). He conducted research on phosphate and iron transport in bacteria, particularly in Escherichia coli. He published 103 research papers during his career.

== Early life and deportation ==
Rosenberg was born on 10 November 1923 in Brest-Litovsk (now Brest, Belarus), then part of Poland, into a Jewish family. His father, Aaron Rosenberg, was a photographer who operated a business called ERO Photography.

In September 1939, following the German invasion of Poland, Brest-Litovsk was occupied by the Soviet Union under the Molotov–Ribbentrop Pact. An NKVD officer who had been a customer at Aaron's photography studio wanted to acquire his Leica camera. In March 1940, Aaron was arrested by the NKVD and charged with being a Polish spy. He was sentenced to eight years in a forced labour camp in forests northeast of Moscow.

In April 1940, the NKVD officer returned and ordered the deportation of Harry and his mother to Karaganda, a village in eastern Siberia near Kazakhstan. The family was separated for nearly two years. In 1941, following the German invasion of the Soviet Union, Aaron was released and rejoined his family in Karaganda.

The deportation removed the family from Brest-Litovsk before the massacre of approximately 20,000 of the city's Jews by Nazi forces on 15 October 1942.

== Education ==
Rosenberg migrated to Australia in July 1947. He enrolled in science at the University of Melbourne in 1948. He graduated with a first-class Honours degree in Chemistry in 1951.

He completed his PhD in biochemistry in 1955. In 1956, he was awarded a travelling scholarship to work in the Department of Biochemistry at the University of Oxford, where he worked with Howard Florey. He was awarded a Doctor of Science degree by the University of Melbourne in 1970.

He held Fulbright scholarships on two occasions: in 1963, he spent 12 months in Los Angeles working at City of Hope Hospital, and in 1983, he worked in Berkeley, California. In 1969, he received a scholarship to work with NASA on space food research.

== Career ==
Before completing his degree, Rosenberg was offered a research position by Hugh Ennor, the foundation Professor of Biochemistry at ANU's John Curtin School of Medical Research. He spent most of his career at ANU. He worked with scientists including Sir John Eccles, Howard Florey, Frank Fenner, and Hugh Ennor.

His early research with Ennor examined the composition and metabolism of phosphogens and phosphonates. He later worked on phosphorus and iron uptake in cells, focusing on Escherichia coli. He and his colleagues studied the mechanisms and regulation of phosphate transport using mutant bacterial strains.

He published papers on phosphate transport in Biochimica et Biophysica Acta (1971), Journal of Bacteriology (1977), Biochemical Journal (1979), and Journal of Bacteriology (1982).

He taught undergraduate microbiology at ANU and gave courses at James Cook University. He retired in 1987.

In 1988 he returned to the Australian National University, as a consultant on the storage of solar energy.

== Personal life ==
Rosenberg married Betty (Berta) Chani. They had three sons: Michael, Geoffrey, and Paul.

He was a member of the Canberra Chamber Music Society and Musica Viva from 1959. He served on the committee, was Canberra president, and was made a life member of Musica Viva. He was also president of the Canberra Food & Wine Club and maintained a wine collection.

He was involved in establishing the Canberra Jewish community and served as its first Sunday school teacher.

== Writing ==
In 1994, Rosenberg was diagnosed with cancer. He wrote a collection of autobiographical stories about his wartime experiences. The book, titled The Leica and Other Stories, was launched in January 1995 at the ACT Jewish Centre. The book was published by his sons Michael and Geoffrey.

== Death ==
Harry Rosenberg died on 12 May 1995 in Canberra. His 95 year old mother died in Melbourne three days later.
