= Department of Education and Science (Australia) =

Australian government department, 1966–1972

Department overview
- Formed: 13 December 1966
- Preceding Department: Department of Territories (I) – for education in the NT Department of the Interior (II) – for education in the ACT and Jervis Bay Prime Minister's Department – for the Education Division and the Office of Education
- Dissolved: 19 December 1972
- Superseding Department: Department of Education (I) Department of Science (I)
- Jurisdiction: Commonwealth of Australia
- Department executives: John Bunting, Secretary (1966–1967); Hugh Ennor, Secretary (1967–1972)

The Department of Education and Science was an Australian government department that existed between December 1966 and December 1972.

== Scope ==
Information about the department's functions and government funding allocation could be found in the Administrative Arrangements Orders, the annual Portfolio Budget Statements and in the Department's annual reports.

At its creation, the Department's functions were:

- general education policy
- education research
- administration of various schemes of assistance for overseas students in Australia, particularly the Colombo Plan
- Australian activities in relation to UNESCO
- administration of scholarships for Australian students
- administrative assistance for the committee concerned with the development of the concept and scheme of advanced education in Australia
- science facilities grants to secondary schools both government and non-government
- secretariat for the Australian Research Grants Committee

== Structure ==
The Department was a Commonwealth Public Service department, staffed by officials who were responsible to the Minister for Education and Science.
