= Greg Tegart =

Australian public servant (1929–2023

Greg Tegart AM FTSE

Secretary of the Department of Science and Technology
- In office 24 December 1981 – 13 December 1984

Secretary of the Department of Science
- In office 13 December 1984 – 24 July 1987

Personal details
- Born: William John McGregor Tegart; 27 March 1929
- Died: 4 July 2023 (aged 94)
- Education: University of Melbourne; RMIT University; University of Sheffield
- Occupation: Academic and public servant

William John McGregor "Greg" Tegart AM FTSE (27 March 1929 – 4 July 2023) was an Australian senior public servant. He was latterly an adjunct professor at Victoria University.

== Early life ==
William John McGregor Tegart was born on 27 March 1929. He was educated at the Royal Melbourne Institute of Technology, University of Melbourne and University of Sheffield.

== Career ==
Tegart first joined the Australian Public Service in 1947 as a laboratory assistant and technical officer with the Commonwealth Scientific and Industrial Research Organisation.

Tegart was appointed Secretary of the Department of Science and Technology in 1981.

Tegart retired from the public service in 1993.

== Death ==
Tegart died on 4 July 2023, at the age of 94.

== Awards and honours ==
In June 1990, Tegart was made a Member of the Order of Australia in recognition of service to science and technology.

Tegart was a Foundation Fellow of the Australian Academy of Technological Sciences and Engineering.

Government offices
Preceded by John Farrands	Secretary of the Department of Science and Technology; 1981 – 1984	Succeeded by Himself as Secretary of the Department of Science
Preceded by Himself as Secretary of the Department of Science and Technology	Secretary of the Department of Science; 1984 – 1987	Department abolished
