= Department of Science and Consumer Affairs =

Australian government department, 1975–1975

Department overview
- Formed: 6 June 1975
- Preceding Department: Department of Science (I)
- Dissolved: 22 December 1975
- Superseding Department: Department of Science (II) Department of Business and Consumer Affairs
- Jurisdiction: Commonwealth of Australia
- Ministers responsible: Bill Morrison, Minister (6 June 1975); Clyde Cameron, Minister (Jun – Nov 1975); Bob Cotton, Minister (Nov – Dec 1975)
- Department executive: Hugh Ennor, Secretary

The Department of Science and Consumer Affairs was an Australian government department that existed between June and December 1975.

== Scope ==
Information about the department's functions and government funding allocation could be found in the Administrative Arrangements Orders, the annual Portfolio Budget Statements and in the department's annual reports.

At its creation, the department's functions were:

- Science and technology, including research, support of research and support of civil space research programs
- Meteorology
- Ionospheric prediction service
- Analytical laboratory service
- Patents of inventions and designs, and trade marks
- Weights and measure
- National standards
- Consumer affairs

== Structure ==
The department was a Commonwealth Public Service department, staffed by officials who were responsible to the Minister for Science and Consumer Affairs.
