= John Farrands =

John Farrands AO CB

Secretary of the Department of Science
- In office 7 October 1977 – 30 November 1978

Secretary of the Department of Science and the Environment
- In office 5 December 1978 – 3 November 1980

Secretary of the Department of Science and Technology
- In office 3 November 1980 – 24 December 1981

Personal details
- Born: John Laws Farrands; 11 March 1921 Melbourne, Victoria
- Died: 14 July 1996 (aged 75) Melbourne, Victoria
- Education: University of Melbourne; University of London; Imperial College London
- Occupation: Public servant, scientist

John Law Farrands, AO, CB (11 March 1921 – 14 July 1996) was a scientist and senior Australian public servant.

== Life and career ==
John Farrands was born on 11 March 1921 in Melbourne, Victoria. He studied part-time at the University of Melbourne for his Bachelor of Science, majoring in physics and mathematics.

Farrands was the Chief Defence Scientist and the Secretary of the Australian Government science department between 1977 and 1981.

Farrands retired from the Australian Public Service on Christmas Eve 1981.

Farrands died in Melbourne on 14 July 1996.

== Awards ==
Farrands was made a Companion of the Order of the Bath in December 1981 when he was Secretary of the Department of Science. In June 1990 Farrands was appointed an Officer of the Order of Australia in recognition of service to science and technology.

Government offices
Preceded by Arthur Wills	Chief Defence Scientist of Australia; 1971–1977	Succeeded by Tom Fink
Preceded by Hugh Ennor	Secretary of the Department of Science; 1977–1978	Succeeded by Himself as Secretary of the Department of Science and the Environment
Preceded by Himself as Secretary of the Department of Science	Secretary of the Department of Science and the Environment; 1978–1980	Succeeded by Himself as Secretary of the Department of Science and Technology
Preceded by Bob Lansdown as Secretary of the Department of Environment, Housing and Community Development	Secretary of the Department of Science and the Environment; 1978–1980	Succeeded by Himself as Secretary of the Department of Science and Technology
Preceded by Himself as Secretary of the Department of Science and the Environment	Secretary of the Department of Science and Technology; 1980–1981	Succeeded by Greg Tegart
