= Department of Education (1972–1983) =

Australian government department, 1972–1983

Department overview
- Formed: 19 December 1972
- Preceding Department: Department of Education and Science – for education Department of External Territories (II) – for Norfolk Island education Department of the Interior (II) – for Aboriginal education, Northern Territory, function passed via Department of Aboriginal Affairs Department of Labour and National Service – for child care
- Dissolved: 11 March 1983
- Superseding Department: Department of Education and Youth Affairs
- Jurisdiction: Commonwealth of Australia
- Headquarters: Canberra
- Ministers responsible: Kim Edward Beazley, Minister (1972–1975); Margaret Guilfoyle, Minister (1975); John Carrick, Minister (1975–1979); Wal Fife, Minister (1979–1982); Peter Baume, Minister (1982–1983)
- Department executives: Hugh Ennor, Acting Secretary (1972–1973); Kenneth Norman Jones, Secretary (1973–1983)

The Department of Education was an Australian government department that existed between December 1972 and March 1983.

== History ==
The department was one of eight new departments established by the Whitlam government, a wide restructuring that revealed some of the new government's program.

== Scope ==
Information about the department's functions and government funding allocation could be found in the Administrative Arrangements Orders, the annual Portfolio Budget Statements and in the department's annual reports.

According to the Administrative Arrangements Order issued 19 December 1972, at its creation, the department was responsible for Education, including education in the Northern Territory of Australia, the Australian Capital Territory and Norfolk Island.

== Structure ==
The department was an Australian Public Service department, staffed by officials who were responsible to the minister for education, initially Kim Edward Beazley (until June 1975), then Margaret Guilfoyle as a caretaker minister for the month leading up to the December 1975 election (after the 11 November 1975 Dismissal in which the governor-general appointed Leader of the Opposition, Malcolm Fraser, as caretaker prime minister and he in turn appointed caretaker ministers). Subsequent ministers were John Carrick (1975‑1979), Wal Fife (1979‑1982) and finally Peter Baume (1982‑1983).

The department was headed by a secretary, initially (acting in the position) Hugh Ennor (until January 1973) and then Kenneth Norman Jones (from January 1973).
