= 1974 Australian Senate election =

Australian federal election results

1974 Australian Senate elections
- 18 May 1974

All 60 seats in the Australian Senate 31 seats needed for a majority
- Turnout: 95.50%
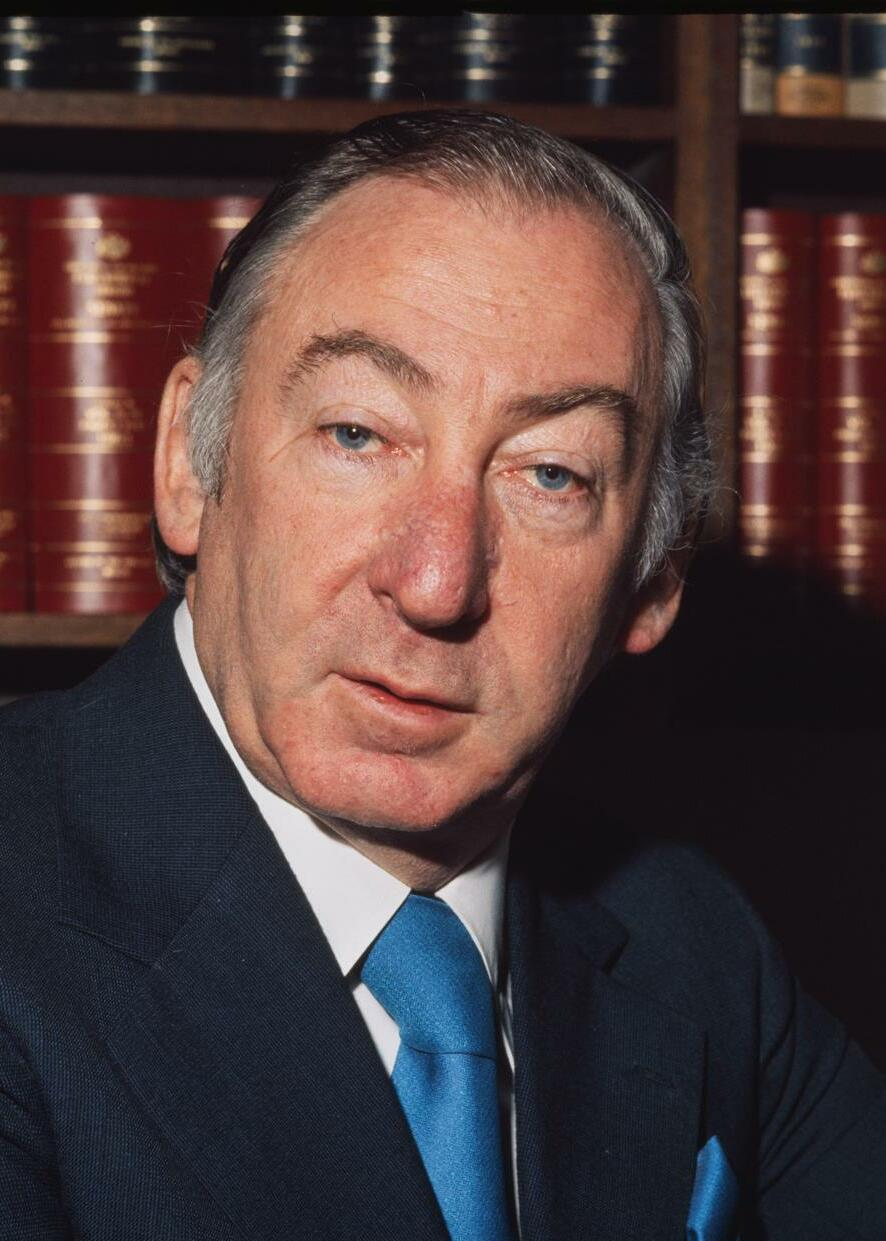

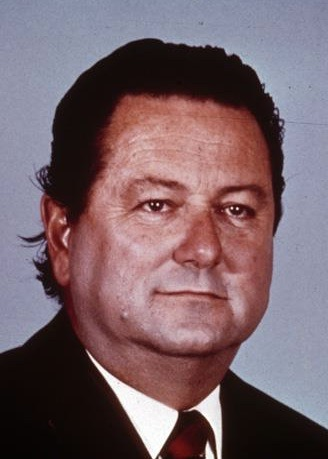

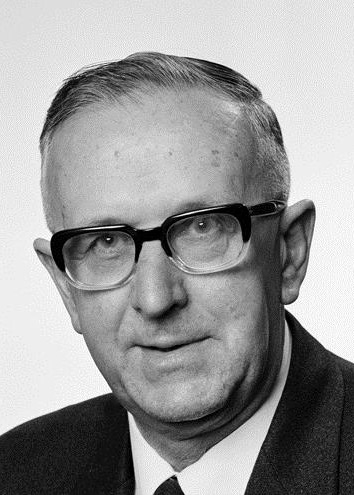
	First party	Second party	Third party
Leader	Lionel Murphy	Reg Withers	Frank McManus
Party	Labor	Liberal/Country coalition	Democratic Labor
Leader since	8 February 1967	20 December 1972	10 October 1973
Leader's seat	New South Wales	Western Australia	Victoria
Seats before	26	26	5
Seats after	29	29	0
Seat change	▲3	▲3	▼5
Popular vote	3,127,197	2,901,454	235,343
Percentage	47.29%	43.88%	3.56%
Swing	▼ %	▲5.70%	▼7.55%
- Senators elected in the 1974 federal election
Leader of the Senate before election
Lionel Murphy
Labor
Elected Leader of the Senate
Lionel Murphy
Labor

A federal election was held in Australia on 18 May 1974. All 60 seats in the Senate were up for election as well as all 127 seats in the House of Representatives, due to a double dissolution.

== Background ==
Following an attempt by Prime Minister Gough Whitlam to create an extra Senate vacancy in Queensland by appointing former Democratic Labor Party (DLP) Leader, Senator Vince Gair, as Ambassador to Ireland, Liberal leader Billy Snedden announced that the opposition would block the Government's supply bills in the Senate. After a great deal of legalistic argumentation in both houses about the Gair Affair, and justified by the failure of six (non-supply) bills to pass the Senate, Whitlam requested and was granted by Governor-General Sir Paul Hasluck a double dissolution under section 57 of the Constitution. The already-announced election date of 18 May was kept. The election focused on Whitlam's first 1 1/2 years in office and whether the Australian public was willing to continue with his reform agenda.

== Nationwide results ==
Senate (STV) – 1974–75 – Turnout 95.50% (CV) – Informal 10.77%
Party	First preference votes	%	Swing	Seats won	Seats held	Change
Labor	3,127,197	47.29	▲+5.08	29	29	+3
Liberal–Country coalition	2,901,454	43.88	▲+5.70	29	29	+3
Liberal–Country joint ticket	2,298,816	34.77	▲+15.26	16	*	*
Liberal	516,919	7.82	▼−9.79	12	23	+2
National Alliance	55,301	0.84	▲+0.84	1	*	*
Country	30,418	0.46	▼–0.60	0	6	+1
Democratic Labor	235,343	3.56	▼−7.55	0	0	–5
Australia	92,107	1.39	▼−1.51	0	0	0
Liberal Movement	63,032	0.95	*	1	1	+1
National Liberal	23,965	0.36	*	0	0	0
Communist	20,583	0.31	*	0	0	0
United Christian	3,977	0.06	*	0	0	0
United Tasmania	2,051	0.03	*	0	0	0
National Socialist	1,810	0.03	▼–0.40	0	0	0
Republican	484	0.01	*	0	0	0
Social Credit	379	0.01	*	0	0	0
Independents	140,003	2.12	▲+0.41	1	1	–2
Total	6,612,385			60	60	

Notes

- The Country Party (CP) contested the elections in Western Australia as the National Alliance (NA), which was a merger of the CP and the Democratic Labor Party (DLP) in that state. The NA won a single Senate seat in WA, its elected representative being Tom Drake-Brockman, who sat with the CP on election to parliament.
- Independent: Michael Townley (Liberal Party from Feb 1975)

The NSW portion of this vote was telling of the disadvantages of requiring the marking of preferences for all the candidates. NSW voters faced a list of 73 candidate for the state's 12 seats. Twelve percent of Labour voters cast improper votes that were rejected. The final seat was taken by a candidate that received only about one percent of the vote. The result across the country was 29 Liberal/National, 29 Labour and two others holding the balance of power.

== See also ==
- 1974 Australian federal election
- Candidates of the Australian federal election, 1974
- Members of the Australian Senate, 1974–1975
