= Kevin Newman (politician) =

Australian politician (1933–1999)

The Honourable Kevin Newman AO
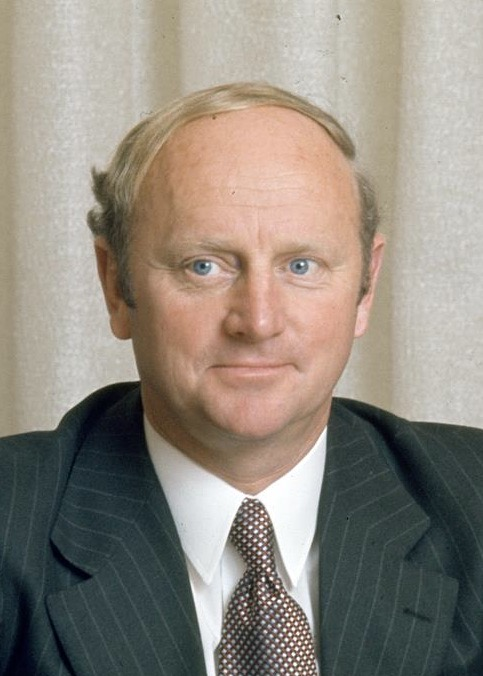

Minister for Administrative Services
- In office 3 November 1980 – 11 March 1983
- Prime Minister: Malcolm Fraser
- Preceded by: John McLeay
- Succeeded by: John Brown

Minister for Productivity
- In office 8 December 1979 – 3 November 1980
- Prime Minister: Malcolm Fraser
- Preceded by: Ian Macphee
- Succeeded by: Abolished

Minister for National Development
- In office 20 December 1977 – 8 December 1979
- Prime Minister: Malcolm Fraser
- Preceded by: Created
- Succeeded by: John Carrick

Minister for Environment, Housing and Community Development
- In office 8 July 1976 – 20 December 1977
- Prime Minister: Malcolm Fraser
- Preceded by: Ivor Greenwood
- Succeeded by: Ray Groom

Minister for Repatriation
- In office 22 December 1975 – 8 July 1976
- Prime Minister: Malcolm Fraser
- Preceded by: Don Chipp
- Succeeded by: Ray Groom

Member of the Australian Parliament for Bass
- In office 28 June 1975 – 26 October 1984
- Preceded by: Lance Barnard
- Succeeded by: Warwick Smith

Personal details
- Born: 10 October 1933 Kensington, New South Wales, Australia
- Died: 17 July 1999 (aged 65) Canberra, Australian Capital Territory, Australia
- Party: Liberal
- Spouse: Jocelyn Mullett (m. 1961)
- Children: Campbell Newman
- Occupation: Army officer

Military service
- Allegiance: Australia
- Branch/service: Australian Army
- Years of service: 1952–1975
- Rank: Colonel
- Unit: 3rd Battalion, Royal Australian Regiment; 2nd Battalion, Royal Australian Regiment
- Commands: 6th Military District (1973–75); 5th Battalion, Royal Australian Regiment (1972–73)
- Battles/wars: Malayan Emergency; Vietnam War

Kevin Eugene Newman, AO (10 October 1933 – 17 July 1999) was an Australian soldier and politician. He was a member of the Liberal Party and held ministerial office in the Fraser government, serving as Minister for Repatriation (1975–1976), Environment, Housing and Community Development (1976–1977), National Development (1977–1979), Productivity (1979–1980), and Administrative Services (1980–1983). He represented the Tasmanian seat of Bass in the House of Representatives from 1975 to 1984. His wife Jocelyn also became a federal government minister, while his son Campbell became premier of Queensland.

== Early life ==
Newman was born on 10 October 1933 in Kensington, New South Wales. He was the son of Veronica (née Somes) and Eugene Henry Newman; his father worked as a tiler. He was educated at the Scots College in Sydney, attending from 1943 to 1951.

== Military service ==
Newman attended the Royal Military College, Duntroon, from 1952 to 1955. He joined the 3rd Battalion, Royal Australian Regiment, as an infantry platoon commander in 1956 and served overseas during the Malayan Emergency. He later transferred to the School of Infantry in Seymour, Victoria, as an instructor, before moving to Canberra where he taught at the Royal Military College.

In 1964, Newman transferred to Army Headquarters in Canberra as a staff officer. He was promoted major the following year and graduated from the Army Command and Staff College in 1966. During the Vietnam War he served as operations officer of the 2nd Battalion, Royal Australian Regiment, from 1967 to 1968. After a period on exchange with the British Army, he was promoted to lieutenant colonel and served as commanding officer of 5th Battalion, Royal Australian Regiment, from 1972 to 1973. His final military appointment saw him move to Tasmania, where he was commander of the 6th Military District from 1973 to 1975.

== Political career ==
Newman was elected to the House of Representatives at the 1975 Bass by-election, winning the seat for the Liberal Party following the resignation of former ALP deputy prime minister Lance Barnard. The by-election was the subject of national attention, occurring during the lead-up to the 1975 constitutional crisis during a period of unpopularity for the Whitlam government. Newman would be comfortably re-elected at the 1975, 1977, 1980 and 1983 elections.

After less than six months as an MP, Newman was appointed Minister for Repatriation in the Fraser government in December 1975, the only Tasmanian in the ministry. Following a reshuffle in July 1976 he was appointed Minister for Environment, Housing and Community Development. In that portfolio he "infuriated the Queensland premier, Sir Joh Bjelke-Petersen, by announcing an export ban on mineral sands from Fraser Island". After the 1977 election, Newman was appointed Minister for National Development. In that role he dealt with the 1979 oil crisis. He was the subject of sustained opposition questioning in parliament on the possibility of oil drilling in the Great Barrier Reef, including an unsuccessful censure motion, announcing in July 1979 that no new oil exploration would be permitted in the region.

Newman was appointed Minister for Productivity and minister assisting the Prime Minister in Federal Affairs in a December 1979 reshuffle. After the 1980 election he was made Minister for Administrative Services, in which capacity he supported the establishment of the National Crime Authority. He was not included in Andrew Peacock's shadow ministry after the Coalition's defeat at the 1983 election. In July 1984 he announced that he would not recontest his seat at the next federal election.

== Post-political activities ==
After leaving parliament, Newman held roles with various community organisations including as chairman of the Launceston Public Hospitals District (1986–1989), as a director of the Australian Stockman's Hall of Fame in Queensland (1985–1999), and as the inaugural chairman of the governing council of Old Parliament House, Canberra (1997–1999).

Newman was active in heritage preservation, serving as president of the Tasmanian branch of the National Trust of Australia (1988–1991) and as chairman of the Australian Council of National Trusts (1992–1995). He acquired Hillview House, a historic property in Launceston dating from 1840, and renovated the Old Bakery Inn in Launceston into a hotel and restaurant. He was involved in National Trust efforts to preserve historic sites from demolition, including the C. H. Smith Buildings in Launceston, Gawler Chambers in Adelaide, and the Woolloomooloo Wharf in Sydney.

Newman was appointed an Officer of the Order of Australia in the Queen's Birthday Honours of 1994.

== Personal life ==
In 1961, Newman married Jocelyn Mullett, with whom he had two children. His wife was also a Liberal Party politician, serving as a senator for Tasmania and as a minister in the Howard government. Their son Campbell Newman served as lord mayor of Brisbane (2004–2011) and premier of Queensland (2012–2015).

Newman was diagnosed with lupus in the early 1980s. He died at a hospital in Canberra on 17 July 1999, aged 65, due to a chronic lung disease associated with lupus.

== See also ==
- Political families of Australia

Political offices
Preceded by Don Chipp	Minister for Repatriation; 1975–1976	Succeeded by Peter Durack
Preceded by Ivor Greenwood	Minister for Environment, Housing and Community Development; 1976–1977	Succeeded by Ray Groom
Preceded by Doug Anthony	Minister for National Development; 1977–1980	Succeeded by John Carrick
Preceded by Ian Macphee	Minister for Productivity; 1979–1980	Position abolished
Preceded by John McLeay	Minister for Administrative Services; 1980–1983	Succeeded by John Brown
Parliament of Australia
Preceded by Lance Barnard	Member for Bass; 1975–1984	Succeeded by Warwick Smith
