= Directorate for Science and Technology =

Directorate for Science and Technology may refer to:

- Central Intelligence Agency Directorate of Science & Technology
- DHS Directorate for Science and Technology

== See also ==
- Department of Science and Technology (disambiguation)
