= Department of Science (1975–1978) =

Australian government department, 1975–1978

Department overview
- Formed: 22 December 1975
- Preceding Department: Department of Minerals and Energy – mineral and solar energy research Department of Science and Consumer Affairs – for science
- Dissolved: 5 December 1978
- Superseding Department: Department of Science and the Environment
- Jurisdiction: Commonwealth of Australia
- Headquarters: Canberra
- Minister responsible: James Webster, Minister
- Department executives: Hugh Ennor, Secretary (1975–1977); John Farrands, Secretary (1977–1978)

The Department of Science was an Australian government department that existed between December 1975 and December 1978. It was the second so-named Australian government department.

== Scope ==
Information about the department's functions and government funding allocation could be found in the Administrative Arrangements Orders, the annual Portfolio Budget Statements and in the department's annual reports.

According to the National Archives of Australia, at its creation, the department was responsible for:

- Science and technology, including research, support of research and support of civil space programs
- Meteorology
- Ionospheric Prediction Service
- Analytical laboratory service
- Weights and measures

== Structure ==
The department was an Australian Public Service department, staffed by officials who were responsible to the Minister for Science, James Webster.

The department was headed by a Secretary, initially Hugh Ennor (until October 1977) and then John Farrands.

== Controversy ==
In December 1975, a task force of the Royal Commission on Australian Government accused the department of questionable logic, misinterpretation of facts and faulty data.
