= Bill Brown (Australian politician) =

Australian politician (1920–2001)

Senator for Victoria
- In office 19 November 1969 – 20 November 1970
- Preceded by: Sam Cohen
- Succeeded by: George Hannan
- In office 1 July 1971 – 30 June 1978

Personal details
- Born: 4 December 1920 Melbourne, Victoria
- Died: 26 June 2001 (aged 80) Greensborough, Victoria
- Party: Labor Party
- Occupation: Unionist

William Walter Charles Brown (4 December 1920 – 26 June 2001) was an Australian politician who served as a Senator for Victoria from 1969 to 1970 and 1971 to 1978, representing the Labor Party.

Born in Melbourne, he was educated at state schools and then at Taylor's College, after which he became an apprentice cabinet-maker. He served in the military from 1941 to 1946, and was an organiser and Victorian Secretary of the Federated Furnishing Trades Society. In 1961, he served as President of the Melbourne Trades Hall Council, and as President of the Victorian Labor Party 1965–1968.

On 19 November 1969, he was appointed to the Australian Senate as a Labor Senator for Victoria, filling the casual vacancy caused by the death of Sam Cohen. Brown's appointment lasted until the 1970 election, when he was elected in his own right; his new term did not begin until 1 July 1971, however, and Liberal George Hannan served the remainder of Cohen's term. He was defeated in 1977, when he was demoted to third position on the Labor ticket to make room for Gareth Evans.
