= Jackson Committee =

The Jackson Committee was established in 1974 by the Whitlam government of Australia to advise on policies for Australia's manufacturing industry.

The committee was chaired by R.G. Jackson, the then general manager and a director of CSR. Its report advocated a move towards a more open economy, with gradual structural adjustment of Australia's manufacturing sector. However, it was criticized over its call for increased assistance to manufacturing through grants and tax concessions and its suggestion that exchange-rate policy should offer more support for the sector. Its multi-volume report was tabled in October 1975. The report took an interdisciplinary approach, considering not only economic aspects but also social and human factors within manufacturing, such as worker participation and job satisfaction, and was intended to inform a subsequent White Paper on the industry. A notable aspect was a dissenting minority report by committee member G.A. Rattigan.
