= Department of Science and Technology (Australia) =

Australian government department, 1980–1984

Department overview
- Formed: 3 November 1980
- Preceding Department: Department of Science and the Environment Department of Productivity
- Dissolved: 13 December 1984
- Superseding Department: Department of Home Affairs and Environment Department of Industry, Technology and Commerce Department of Science (III)
- Jurisdiction: Commonwealth of Australia
- Headquarters: Belconnen, Canberra
- Department executives: John Farrands, Secretary (1980–1981); Greg Tegart, Secretary (1981–1984)

The Department of Science and Technology was an Australian government department that existed between November 1980 and December 1984.

== History ==
The department was created by the Fraser government, joining the Department of Productivity with the Department of Science and the Environment, having received advice from the Australian Science and Technology Council that there would be merit in merging the two departments.

The department was abolished by the Hawke government in December 1984, making way for the new Department of Industry, Technology and Commerce.

== Scope ==
Information about the department's functions and government funding allocation could be found in the Administrative Arrangements Orders, the annual Portfolio Budget Statements and in the department's annual reports.

According to the Administrative Arrangements Order made on 3 November 1980, the department dealt with:

- Science and technology, including research, support of research and support of civil space research programs
- Productivity of industry
- Patents of inventions and designs, and trade marks
- Meteorology
- Ionospheric prediction services
- Analytical laboratory services
- Weights and measures

== Structure ==
The department was an Australian Public Service department, staffed by officials who were responsible to the Ministers for Science and Technology.
