= Sam Cohen (Australian politician) =

Australian politician

Sam Cohen QC
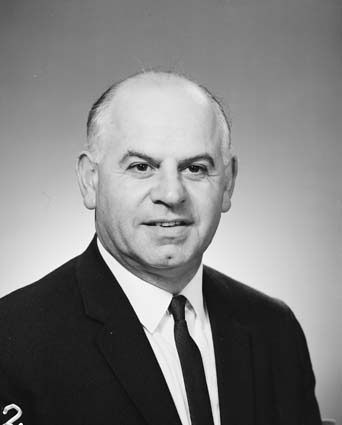

Senator for Victoria
- In office 1 July 1962 – 7 October 1969
- Succeeded by: Bill Brown

Personal details
- Born: 26 October 1918 Bankstown, New South Wales, Australia
- Died: 7 October 1969 (aged 50) Woodville, South Australia, Australia
- Party: Labor
- Spouse: Judith Selig (m. 1953)
- Education: University of Melbourne
- Occupation: Barrister

Samuel Herbert Cohen QC (26 October 1918 – 7 October 1969) was an Australian politician and barrister. He was a member of the Australian Labor Party (ALP) and served as a Senator for Victoria from 1962 until his death in 1969. He was also a member of Gough Whitlam's shadow ministry from 1967. He was the first Jew elected to the Senate.

== Early life ==
Cohen was born on 26 October 1918 in Bankstown, New South Wales, the son of Fanny Dinah (née Fagelman) and Max Lazarus Cohen. His parents were Russian Jews who had arrived in Australia as children. His father worked briefly as a tailor and draper in Griffith, New South Wales, and later as a tyre salesman for Beaurepaires. Cohen and his family moved to Melbourne when he was seven years old. He sung in the choir of the St Kilda synagogue, where he became friends with future governor-general Zelman Cowen. He attended Elwood Central School before winning a scholarship to Wesley College, Melbourne.

At the University of Melbourne Cohen won a scholarship to Queen's College, graduating Bachelor of Arts (1940), Bachelor of Laws (1941), and Master of Laws (1942). He was president of the Students' Representative Council and was involved in the National Union of Australian University Students. From 1942 to 1943 Cohen worked on the staff of Alfred Conlon in the Army Land Headquarters Research Section. He then worked with the Universities Commission in Sydney from 1943 to 1945.

Cohen was called to the Victorian Bar in 1946. He married solicitor Judith Selig in 1953, with whom he had two daughters. He was appointed Queen's Counsel (QC) in 1961. At the bar he specialised in industrial law, where he worked closely with another future Labor MP Clyde Holding, and was a pioneer of common-law workers' compensation claims.

== Politics ==
Cohen was active in Melbourne's Jewish community, serving as secretary of the United Israel Appeal in 1948, chairman of the public relations committee of the Victorian Jewish Board of Deputies, and vice-president of the Victorian Friends of the Hebrew University of Jerusalem. In 1942 he became a founding member of the Jewish Council to Combat Fascism and Anti-Semitism, later serving as its president from 1957 to 1962. The organisation was left-oriented and was opposed by some in the Jewish community, who considered it too pro-Soviet or even a communist front.

Cohen joined the Australian Labor Party (ALP) in 1946, and served as president of its North Kew branch. He was a member of the Labor Left faction and in 1961 he was elected to the Victorian Central Executive, which the faction controlled. He chaired its legal, civil liberties, and law reform committees.

=== Senate ===
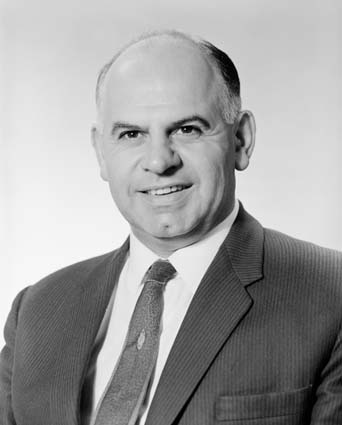
Cohen in 1962

Cohen was elected to the Senate at the 1961 federal election, following a controversial preselection process. His chief opponent was another prominent Jewish barrister Maurice Ashkanasy, who had the support of the Labor Right faction and had opposed the work of the Jewish Council. During the campaign an anonymous pamphlet was circulated to ALP branches labelling Cohen as a fellow traveller.

In 1962, Cohen voted against William Haworth's proposal for Australia to raise antisemitism in the Soviet Union at the United Nations. The government used this to expose divisions between Cohen and the anti-Soviet faction of his party, which included Syd Einfeld, the president of the Executive Council of Australian Jewry. In reply to prominent anti-communist George Hannan, who detailed instances of antisemitism, Cohen stated that Hannan had exaggerated the problem and that Jews largely enjoyed equal rights in the Soviet Union. He accused the government of making a "political football out of human suffering". Cohen's speech was "excoriated in the Australian Jewish Herald" and opposed by the Victorian Jewish Board of Deputies, weakening relations between the Melbourne Jewish community and the ALP.

Cohen was a "vigorous opponent" of Australian involvement in the Vietnam War. In 1967 he was elected as the deputy to Lionel Murphy, the Leader of the Opposition in the Senate. He was also elected to Gough Whitlam's shadow ministry, and subsequently appointed by Whitlam as shadow minister for education, science, communications and the arts. He also served on the council of the Australian National University and the executive of the CSIRO. His proposals for a Schools Commission and needs-based Commonwealth grants were later implemented by the Whitlam government. However, in 1968 Cohen was a member of the ALP Federal Executive that came into conflict with Whitlam, resulting in a leadership spill.

=== Death ===
Cohen died of a heart attack on 7 October 1969, aged 50. He had been campaigning in Adelaide for the 1969 federal election before collapsing and being taken to The Queen Elizabeth Hospital. He was granted a state funeral and buried at Melbourne General Cemetery. Cohen was posthumously awarded Australian Jew of the Year and the Sam Cohen Memorial Lecture series was established in his honour, the first of which was given by Bob Hawke in 1971. Bill Brown was appointed to replace him in his Senate seat.
