= Department of Science (1984–1987) =

Australian government department, 1984–1987

Department overview
- Formed: 13 December 1984
- Preceding Department: Department of Science and Technology
- Dissolved: 24 July 1987
- Superseding Department: Department of the Arts, Sport, the Environment, Tourism and Territories – for the Antarctic territories and related legislation Department of Primary Industries and Energy – for the Australian Institute of Marine Science Act 1972 Department of Employment, Education and Training – for coordination of research policy, research grants and fellowships; Anglo-Australian Telescope Agreement Act 1970 and associated agencies Department of Administrative Services (III) – for meteorology, ionospheric prediction and analytical laboratory services Department of Industry, Technology and Commerce – for patents, science and research policy, the civil space program, weights and measures and the Commission for the Future
- Jurisdiction: Commonwealth of Australia
- Headquarters: Canberra
- Minister responsible: Barry Jones, Minister
- Department executive: Greg Tegart, Secretary

The Department of Science was an Australian government department that existed between December 1984 and July 1987. It was the third so-named Australian government department.

== Scope ==
Information about the department's functions and government funding allocation could be found in the Administrative Arrangements Orders, the annual Portfolio Budget Statements and in the department's annual reports.

According to the National Archives of Australia, at its creation, the department was responsible for:

- Science policy and research
- Patents of inventions and designs, and trade marks
- Meteorology
- Ionospheric prediction
- Analytical laboratory services
- Weights and measures
- Administration of the Australian Antarctic Territory and the Territory of Heard Island and the McDonald Islands
- Commission for the Future.

== Structure ==
The department was an Australian Public Service department, staffed by officials who were responsible to the Minister for Science, Barry Jones.

The department was headed by a secretary, Greg Tegart.
