= Department of Science (1972–1975) =

Former Australian government department, 1972–1975

Department overview
- Formed: 19 December 1972
- Preceding Department: Department of Education and Science – for scientific research and support of research; weights and measures and national standards
- Dissolved: 6 June 1975
- Superseding Department: Department of Minerals and Energy – for Minerals and solar energy research Department of Science and Consumer Affairs – for all other functions
- Jurisdiction: Commonwealth of Australia
- Headquarters: Canberra
- Minister responsible: Bill Morrison, Minister for Science
- Department executive: Hugh Ennor, Secretary

The Department of Science was an Australian government department that existed between December 1972 and June 1975.

== Scope ==
Information about the department's functions and government funding allocation could be found in the Administrative Arrangements Orders, the annual Portfolio Budget Statements and in the Department's annual reports.

According to the Administrative Arrangements Order issued 19 December 1972, at its creation, the Department was responsible for:

- Science and technology, including research and support of research
- Meteorology
- Ionospheric prediction service
- Patents of inventions and designs, and trade marks
- Weights and measures

== Structure ==
The Department was an Australian Public Service department, staffed by officials who were responsible to the Minister for Science.

The Secretary of the Department was Hugh Ennor.
