= Laurence Neal =

Australian politician

Senator for Victoria
- In office 11 March 1980 – 30 June 1981
- Preceded by: James Webster

Personal details
- Born: 18 July 1947 (age 79) Wangaratta, Victoria, Australia
- Party: National Country
- Education: La Trobe University; Deakin University
- Occupation: Teacher

Laurence William Neal (born 18 July 1947) is a former Australian politician. He was a Senator for Victoria from 1980 to 1981, representing the National Country Party, and also served for periods as the party's federal director and state president. He was a schoolteacher by profession and later became an ordained Anglican minister.

== Early life ==
Neal was born on 18 July 1947 in Wangaratta, Victoria. He was the son of Eva Isabel (née Dealy) and Charles Neal.

Neal was raised on his family's tobacco-growing property at Gapsted. He was educated in nearby Myrtleford, attending Myrtleford Consolidated School and Myrtleford High School where he was school captain. He went on to study history and politics at La Trobe University, graduating Bachelor of Arts in 1971 and Bachelor of Education in 1974. Neal subsequently taught at Hadfield High School in Pascoe Vale. He later worked as a tutor at La Trobe University, where he was deputy head of Glenn College from 1978 to 1980.

== Politics ==
Neal joined the Country Party in 1968 and established a branch of the Young Country Party (YCP) at La Trobe University. He was a senior vice-president of the YCP and founding editor of the Young Countryman. He was elected to the party's state executive in 1978, by which time it had been renamed the National Party in Victoria and was known federally as the National Country Party (NCP). Neal was editor of the party's monthly newsletter National Outlook and reportedly oversaw a tripling of its subscription base. He was associated with a socially liberal faction within the party, identifying with the "progressive wing" in Victoria.

On 11 March 1980, Neal was appointed to the Senate to fill the casual vacancy caused by the resignation of Victorian NCP senator James Webster. Prior to his appointment he had won preselection against eight other candidates, including the party's state president, two former members of parliament and future state party leader Pat McNamara.

Neal was preselected as the National Party's lead Senate candidate in Victoria at the 1980 federal election, running in third position on the Coalition ticket behind Liberal Party senators Margaret Guilfoyle and Austin Lewis. His candidacy was not successful and his term expired on 30 June 1981. During his brief time in parliament, he served on four Senate committees and spoke on a wide range of topics, including "French nuclear tests in the South Pacific, remedial and migrant education, youth employment, the educational powers of the Commonwealth and the states, emergency accommodation, ethnic broadcasting, computer security, and the protection of the Great Barrier".

After leaving parliament, Neal served as federal director of the National Country Party from 1981 to 1982 and twice sought preselection for the Senate. He later served as state president of the National Party from 1986 to 1988.

== Later life ==
Neal returned to teaching after the end of his Senate term, working at various public and Catholic high schools from 1982 to 2007 and teaching history, politics, film and media, geography and English. He taught at Hadfield High School, Pascoe Vale; Galen Catholic College, Wangaratta; Nathalia High School, Nathalia; Wangaratta High School; and Marian College, Myrtleford.

Neal was ordained as an Anglican minister in 1987 and was a deacon in the dioceses of Wangaratta and Riverina. He served on the Nathalia Shire Council from 1989 to 1992. In 1997 he graduated Master of Arts from Deakin University.
