= Department of Science and the Environment =

Australian government department, 1978–1980

Department overview
- Formed: 5 December 1978
- Preceding Department: Department of Environment, Housing and Community Development – for environment and conservation Department of Science (II) – for science and technology, including research, support of research, and support of civil space programs; meteorology; ionospheric prediction service; analytical laboratory service; weights and measures
- Dissolved: 3 November 1980
- Superseding Department: Department of Home Affairs and Environment – for environment and conservation Department of Science and Technology – for science and technology, meteorology, ionspheric production service, analytical laboratory service, weights and measures
- Jurisdiction: Commonwealth of Australia
- Headquarters: Canberra
- Ministers responsible: James Webster, Minister (1978–1979); David Thomson, Minister (1979–1980)
- Department executive: John Farrands, Secretary

The Department of Science and the Environment was an Australian government department that existed between December 1978 and November 1980.

== Scope ==
Information about the department's functions and government funding allocation could be found in the Administrative Arrangements Orders, the annual Portfolio Budget Statements and in the Department's annual reports.

According to the National Archives of Australia, at its creation, the Department was responsible for:

- Science and technology, including research, support of research and support of civil space research programs
- Environment and conservation
- Meteorology
- Ionospheric Prediction Service
- Analytical laboratory Service
- Weights and measures

== Structure ==
The Department was an Australian Public Service department, staffed by officials who were responsible to the Minister for Science and the Environment.

The Department was headed by a Secretary, John Farrands.
