= Hugh Ennor =

Australian public servant and policymaker (1912–1977)

Sir Hugh Ennor CBE
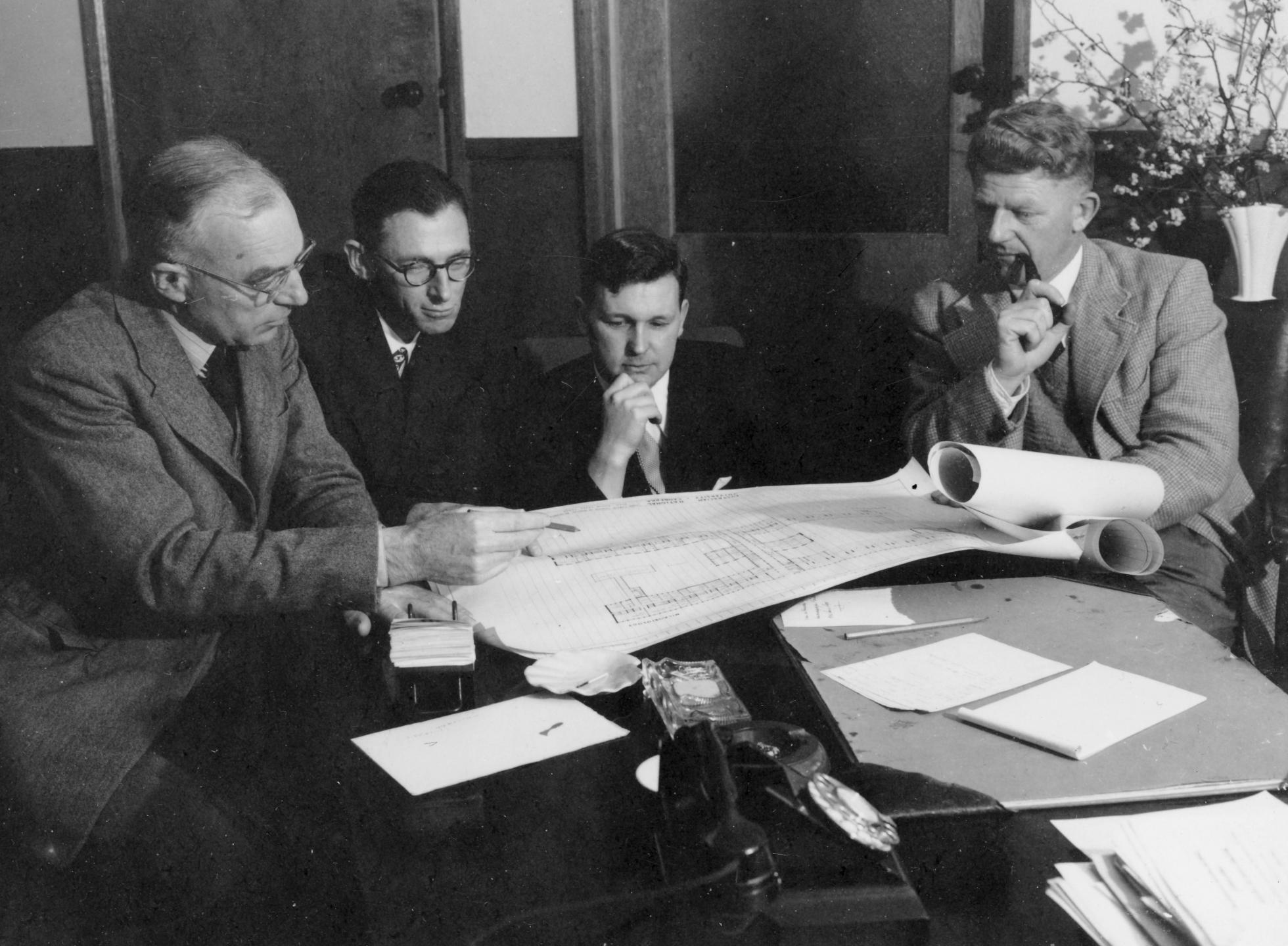
- Ennor (right) and colleagues studying plans for the John Curtin School of Medical Research, 1950

Secretary of the Department of Education and Science
- In office 1 February 1967 – 19 December 1972

Acting Secretary of the Department of Education
- In office 20 December 1972 – 16 January 1973

Secretary of the Department of Science
- In office 19 December 1972 – 6 June 1975

Secretary of the Department of Science and Consumer Affairs
- In office 6 June 1975 – 22 December 1975

Secretary of the Department of Science
- In office 22 December 1975 – 7 October 1977

Personal details
- Born: Arnold Hughes Ennor; 10 October 1912 Gardenvale, Melbourne
- Died: 14 October 1977 (aged 65) Canberra
- Spouse: Violet Phyllis Isobel Argall (m. 1939)
- Children: One son and one daughter
- Education: University of Melbourne
- Occupation: Public servant

Sir Arnold Hughes "Hugh" Ennor CBE (10 October 1912 – 14 October 1977) was a senior Australian public servant and policymaker.

== Life and career ==
Ennor was born in Melbourne, the son of a joiner. For schooling, he attended a local Catholic school, O'Neill College in Elsternwick, Victoria and later Melbourne Technical College. He graduated from the University of Melbourne as a Bachelor of Science with first class honours in 1938, achieving a Master of Science in 1939 and a Doctor of Science in 1944 at the same university.

During the Second World War, Ennor was engaged by Australian Chemical Warfare Research in top secret trials in northern Queensland of mustard gas protective clothing and other counter-measures. He and fellow-biochemist J. W. Legge designed and oversaw the construction of a 100 cubic metre (3,500 cu ft) stainless-steel temperature-controlled gas chamber as part of these experiments.

Ennor was the first professor appointed by the new Australian National University in Canberra in 1948.

In February 1967, Ennor was appointed Secretary of the Australian Government Department of Education and Science. He served as secretary of the science department for over ten years, in the Department of Science (I), the Department of Science and Consumer Affairs, and the Department of Science (II).

He also served for a short period as Acting Secretary of the Department of Education when the Whitlam government split the Department of Education and Science into two.

Hugh Ennor died on 14 October 1977 in Canberra, aged 65. His death was just a week after his retirement from the Australian Public Service.

== Awards ==
Ennor was made a Commander of the Order of the British Empire in January 1963 as a professor of biochemistry at the Australian National University. In June 1965 he was made a Knight Bachelor.

== See also ==
- Keen as Mustard (film), documentary about the mustard gas experiments

== Notes ==
Government offices
Preceded by John Bunting	Secretary of the Department of Education and Science; 1967 – 1972	Succeeded by Himself as Secretary of the Department of Science (I)
Preceded by John Bunting	Secretary of the Department of Education and Science; 1967 – 1972	Succeeded by Himself as Acting Secretary of the Department of Education
Preceded by Himself as Secretary of the Department of Education and Science	Secretary of the< Department of Education (Acting); 1972 – 1973	Succeeded by Kenneth Norman Jones
Preceded by Himself as Secretary of the Department of Education and Science	Secretary of the< Department of Science (I); 1972 – 1975	Succeeded by Himself as Secretary of the Department of Science and Consumer Affairs
Preceded by Himself as Secretary of the Department of Science (I)	Secretary of the< Department of Science and Consumer Affairs; 1975	Succeeded by Himself as Secretary of the Department of Science (II)
Preceded by Himself as Secretary of the Department of Science (I)	Secretary of the< Department of Science and Consumer Affairs; 1975	Succeeded by Alan Carmody as Secretary of the Department of Business and Consumer Affairs
Preceded by Himself as Secretary of the Department of Science and Consumer Affairs	Secretary of the< Department of Science (II); 1975 – 1977	Succeeded by John Farrands
