= 1975 Australian Senate election =

Australian federal election results

1975 Australian Senate elections
- 13 December 1975

All 64 seats in the Australian Senate 33 seats needed for a majority
- Turnout: 95.39%
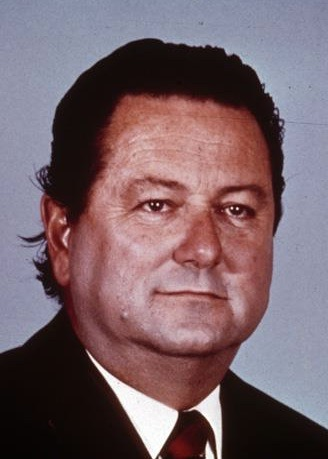

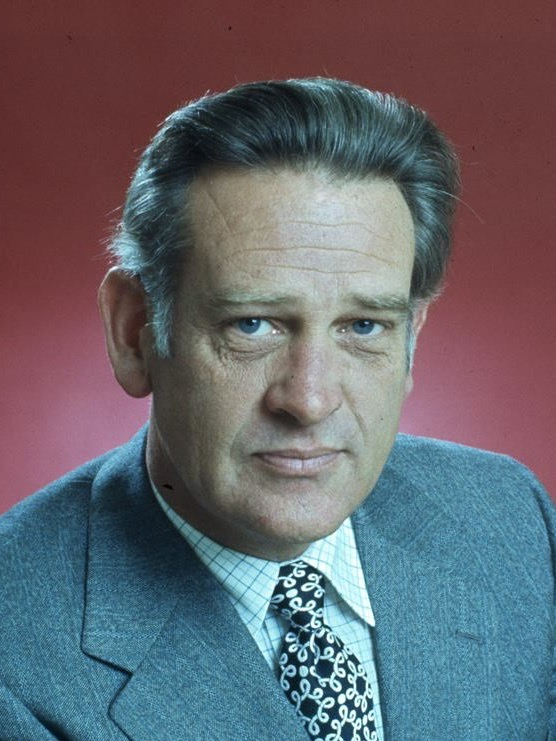
	First party	Second party
Leader	Reg Withers	Ken Wriedt
Party	Liberal/National coalition	Labor
Leader since	20 December 1972	10 February 1975
Leader's seat	Western Australia	Tasmania
Seats before	29	29
Seats after	35	27
Seat change	▲6	▼2
Popular vote	3,706,989	2,931,310
Percentage	51.74%	40.91%
Swing	▲7.85%	▼6.38%
- Senators elected in the 1975 federal election
Leader of the Senate before election
Reg Withers
Liberal/National coalition
Elected Leader of the Senate
Reg Withers
Liberal/National coalition

A federal election was held in Australia on 13 December 1975. All 64 seats in the Senate were up for election as well as all 127 seats in the House of Representatives, due to a double dissolution.

== Background ==
The Australian Capital Territory and the Northern Territory received an entitlement to elect two senators each as a consequence of the Senate (Representation of Territories) Act 1973, passed during the 1974 Joint Sitting of the Australian Parliament.

== Nationwide results ==
Senate (STV) – 1975–77—Turnout 95.39% (CV) – Informal 9.10%
Party	First preference votes	%	Swing	Seats won	Seats held	Change
Liberal–NCP coalition (total)	3,706,989	51.74	+7.85	35	35	+6
Liberal–NCP joint ticket	2,855,721	39.86	+5.09	17	*	*
Liberal	793,772	11.08	+3.26	16	26	+3
National Country	41,977	0.59	−0.71	1	8	+2
Country Liberal	15,519	0.22	+0.22	1	1	+1
Labor	2,931,310	40.91	−6.38	27	27	−2
Democratic Labor	191,049	2.67	−0.89	0	0	0
Liberal Movement	76,426	1.07	+0.11	1	1	0
Workers	62,385	0.87	+0.87	0	0	0
Family Movement	45,658	0.64	+0.64	0	0	0
Australia	34,632	0.48	–0.91	0	0	0
United Tasmania	1,227	0.02	–0.01	0	0	0
Socialist	727	0.01	+0.01	0	0	0
Independents	114,310	1.60	–0.52	1	1	0
Total	7,164,713			64	64	+4

Notes

- Independent: Brian Harradine (Tasmania)

== See also ==
- 1975 Australian federal election
- Candidates of the Australian federal election, 1975
- Members of the Australian Senate, 1974–1975
