= National Liberal Party (Australia) =

- Leader: George Hannan
- Founder: George Hannan
- Founded: 20 March 1974
- Dissolved: 3 March 1975
- Split from: Liberal Party of Australia
- Headquarters: Melbourne, Victoria
- Ideology: Anti-communism; Social conservatism
- Political position: Right-wing
- Senate: 1 / 60 (1974–1975)

The National Liberal Party was a short-lived political party in the Australian state of Victoria. It was formed in 1974 by Senator George Hannan, as a breakaway from the Liberal Party. The party failed to win any seats at the 1974 federal election, and disbanded soon after.

== Background ==
Hannan was a strident social conservative, and was disturbed by the nonchalance of his party to the new "permissive society". In August 1973, he lost Liberal preselection for the next federal election to Alan Missen, a noted civil libertarian and social liberal. However, he later said that his formation of a new party was "only indirectly connected with my loss of endorsement".

== Formation ==
In a speech to the Senate on 20 March 1974, Hannan announced his resignation from the Liberal Party and the formation of the National Liberal Party, of which he was to be leader. He said that the new party's platform was "firmly based on principles enunciated by Sir Robert Menzies" and that it would "uphold the best traditional values of the Liberal Party". His announcement was unexpected, and was made without informing the Liberal leader, Billy Snedden. On 3 April, the President of the Senate, Magnus Cormack, ruled that Hannan would not be recognised as the leader of a political party for Senate purposes (which would have conferred certain benefits in parliamentary procedure).

The new party was officially launched on 31 March, at the Melbourne Town Hall. Hannan announced that the party's policies included abolishing the metric system, ending inheritance tax and sales tax, and reducing parliamentary salaries by ten percent. It was estimated that about 500 people were in attendance, although Hannan had hoped for a crowd of several thousand. Many Liberal Party officials attended as interested observers, but took pains to emphasise to reporters that they had not joined the new party. Past and present MPs in attendance included Alex Buchanan, Horace Petty, and Ivy Wedgwood. The Canberra Times noted that the audience "seemed dominated by migrants, including many wearing Croatian badges". The Tribune, the official newspaper of the Communist Party, claimed that the party was linked with Croatian nationalist groups and that its Senate candidates had attended a gathering celebrating the creation of the fascist Independent State of Croatia.

== 1974 election and demise ==
At the 1974 election, the National Liberal Party ran only in Victoria, although Hannan had previously stated that he hoped a branch could be established in New South Wales. It polled just under 24,000 votes, which amounted to 1.3 percent of the state total. The other two candidates on its ticket besides Hannan were Reginald Hollow and Luke Cuni. On 3 March 1975, Hannan announced that he was disbanding the party and returning to the Liberals.
