= George Hannan =

Australian politician

Senator for Victoria
- In office 28 August 1956 – 30 June 1965
- Preceded by: John Spicer
- In office 21 November 1970 – 18 May 1974
- Preceded by: Bill Brown

Personal details
- Born: 10 September 1910 Wagga Wagga, New South Wales, Australia
- Died: 1 May 2009 (aged 98)
- Party: Liberal
- Other political affiliations: National Liberal (1974–1975)
- Education: University of Melbourne
- Occupation: Barrister

George Conrad Hannan (10 September 1910 – 1 May 2009) was an Australian politician who served as a Senator for Victoria from 1956 to 1965 and 1970 to 1974. He was a member of the Liberal Party for all but the last few months of his career, and was known as a strident anti-communist. He lost Liberal preselection in 1973, and the following year announced the formation of a new social conservative political party, the National Liberal Party. He was unsuccessful in his bid for re-election at the 1974 election and dissolved the party shortly after.

== Early life ==
Hannan was born on 10 September 1910 in Wagga Wagga, New South Wales. He was the oldest son of Theresa Caroline (née Reis) and James Francis Hannan. His father, a country storekeeper, was a Lang Labor supporter and stood for the Australian Labor Party (ALP) in Albury at the 1927 New South Wales state election.

Hannan was educated at St Patrick's College, Goulburn, before going on to study law at the University of Melbourne where he was a member of Newman College. He completed his articles of clerkship in 1933 and was admitted to the Victorian Bar the following year. He married Eileen Frances Williams in 1938, with whom he had four children.

During World War II, Hannan was a member of the Royal Australian Naval Volunteer Reserve. He was mobilised in 1942 and was stationed at the HMAS Cerberus base as a radar officer. After his discharge in 1946, he resumed his legal career but was also employed as a social commentator on 3XY, a Melbourne radio station strongly linked with the Liberal Party. He was a life member of the Wireless Institute of Australia and was an active member of Actors Equity of Australia.

== Politics ==
Hannan served on the state executive of the Liberal and Country Party for over a decade. He first stood for parliament in 1948, losing a Victorian Legislative Council by-election for Melbourne Province. He subsequently contested the Division of Maribyrnong at the 1949 federal election and East Yarra Province at the 1952 Legislative Council election.

Hannan was an unsuccessful candidate for Senate preselection prior to the 1955 federal election. On 28 August 1956, he was appointed to the Senate to fill the casual vacancy caused by the resignation of John Spicer. He defeated Magnus Cormack for the position. At the 1958 federal election he was elected to a full term. He was defeated in 1964, his term ending on 30 June 1965.

He was re-elected at the 1970 Senate election, taking his place immediately. In 1974, he resigned from the Liberal Party, forming a new party, the National Liberal Party, under which banner he contested the 1974 double dissolution election. He received 1.2 per cent of the vote, and was not elected.

George Hannan died on 1 May 2009, aged 98. He was the last surviving member of the 1956–1962 Senate.

== Family ==
Both he and his wife Eileen née Williams were lawyers. They had 2 sons, Peter and Michael, and 2 daughters, Judith and Eilene. Judith Hannan (1939–2014) was married to Sir Guy Boileau, 8th Bt. until his death in February 2013. Eilene Hannan (1946–2014) was a renowned international operatic soprano. Eilene Hannan died in July 2014 and her sister Lady Boileau died less than a month later in August 2014.

Honorary titles
Preceded by Nancy Buttfield	Earliest serving living Senator; 2005 – 2009	Succeeded by Doug McClelland
