= Albanese shadow ministry =

Shadow ministry of Australia (2019–2022)

- Shadow cabinet of Australia

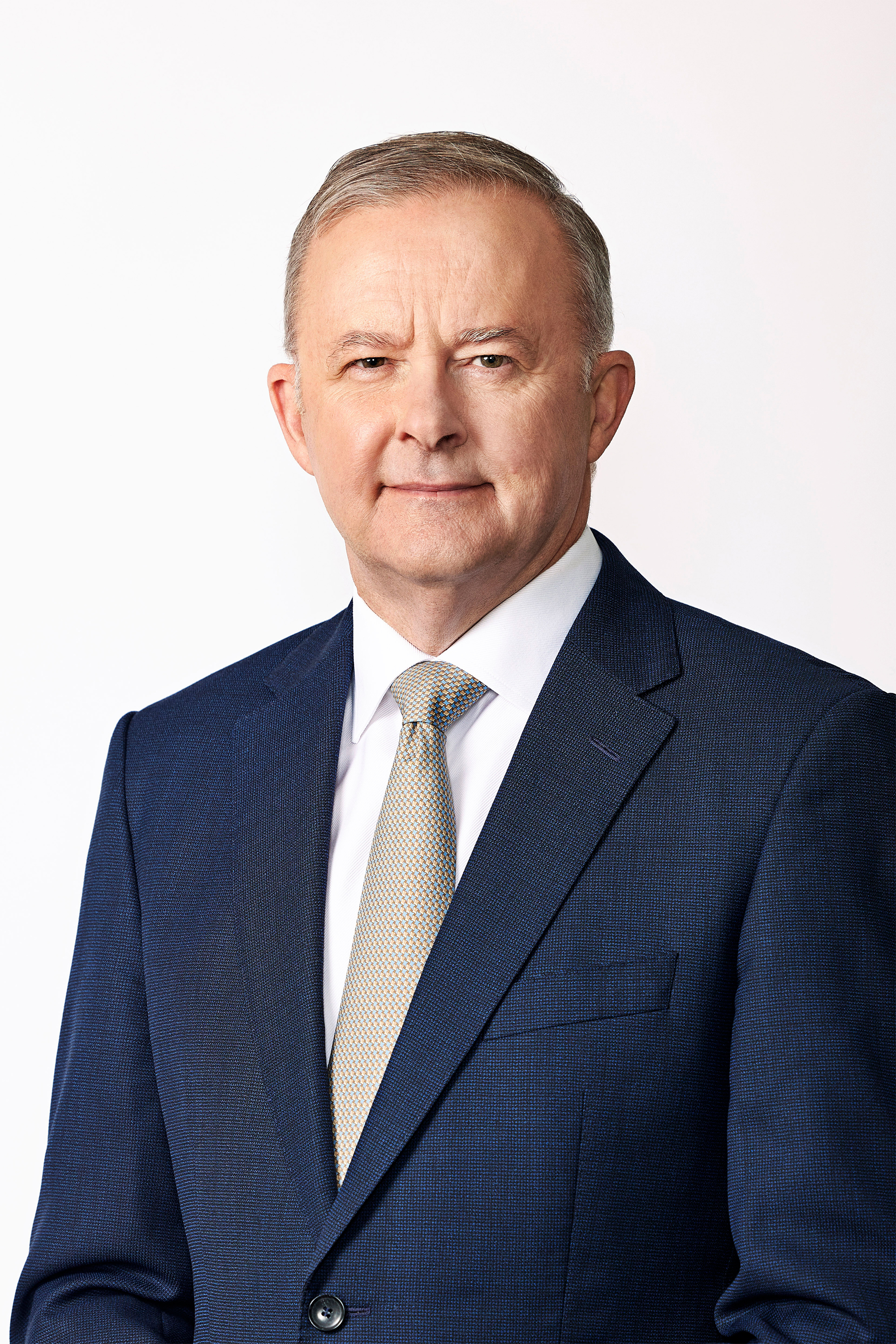
- Albanese in 2022
- Date formed: 2 June 2019
- Date dissolved: 23 May 2022

People and organisations
- Opposition Leader: Anthony Albanese
- Deputy Opposition Leader: Richard Marles
- Member party: Labor
- Status in legislature: Labor opposition

History
- Legislature term: 46th
- Predecessor: Shorten shadow ministry
- Successor: Dutton shadow ministry

The shadow ministry of Anthony Albanese was the Australian Labor Party opposition shadow ministry between 2 June 2019 and 23 May 2022, during the Morrison government. The shadow ministry was established by Anthony Albanese following his election as Leader of the Australian Labor Party (ALP) and Leader of the Opposition on 30 May 2019. Following Labor's victory at the 2022 Australian federal election on 21 May 2022, the shadow ministry was replaced by the Albanese Ministry.

The shadow ministry was the Opposition's alternative to the Second Morrison Ministry, which was sworn in on 29 May 2019. Its most senior members formed a "shadow Cabinet" to the official Cabinet of Australia led by Prime Minister Scott Morrison.

Each state's factions, including Left and Right, were allocated a quota of shadow ministers. The composition of the shadow ministry was determined by the state factions, but the Leader of the Opposition allocated portfolios and selected the shadow cabinet. The shadow ministry contains 30 members, including a shadow cabinet of 20 members, and there are also twelve shadow assistant ministers.

== Final arrangement ==
The final shadow ministry was announced on 28 January 2021, two months after the resignation of Joel Fitzgibbon from the shadow cabinet.

=== Shadow cabinet ===
Shadow Minister	Portfolios	Portrait
Anthony Albanese MP (Grayndler)	Leader of the Opposition; Leader of the Labor Party	
Richard Marles MP (Corio)	Deputy Leader of the Opposition; Deputy Leader of the Labor Party; Shadow Minister for National Reconstruction, Employment, Skills and Small Business; Shadow Minister for Science	
Senator Penny Wong (South Australia)	Leader of the Opposition in the Senate; Shadow Minister for Foreign Affairs	
Senator Kristina Keneally (New South Wales)	Deputy Leader of the Opposition in the Senate; Shadow Minister for Home Affairs; Shadow Minister for Immigration and Citizenship; Shadow Minister for Government Accountability	
Tony Burke MP (Grayndler)	Manager of Opposition Business in the House; Shadow Minister for Industrial Relations; Shadow Minister for the Arts	
Senator Don Farrell (South Australia)	Shadow Special Minister of State; Shadow Minister for Sport and Tourism; Shadow Minister Assisting the Leader of the Opposition	
Jim Chalmers MP (Rankin)	Shadow Treasurer	
Bill Shorten MP (Maribyrnong)	Shadow Minister for the National Disability Insurance Scheme; Shadow Minister for Government Services	
Tanya Plibersek MP (Sydney)	Shadow Minister for Women; Shadow Minister for Education	
Mark Butler MP (Hindmarsh)	Deputy Manager of Opposition Business in the House; Shadow Minister for Health and Ageing	
Chris Bowen MP (McMahon)	Shadow Minister for Climate Change and Energy	
Catherine King MP (Ballarat)	Shadow Minister for Infrastructure, Transport and Regional Development	
Brendan O’Connor MP (Gorton)	Shadow Minister for Defence	
Mark Dreyfus MP (Isaacs)	Shadow Attorney-General; Shadow Minister for Constitutional Reform	
Michelle Rowland MP (Greenway)	Shadow Minister for Communications	
Senator Katy Gallagher (ACT)	Shadow Minister for Finance; Shadow Minister for the Public Service; Manager of Opposition Business in the Senate	
Linda Burney MP (Barton)	Shadow Minister for Social Services; Shadow Minister for Indigenous Australians	
Julie Collins MP (Franklin)	Shadow Minister for Agriculture	
Jason Clare MP (Blaxland)	Shadow Minister for Regional Services, Territories and Local Government; Shadow Minister for Housing and Homelessness	
Amanda Rishworth MP (Kingston)	Shadow Minister for Early Childhood Education; Shadow Minister for Youth	
Terri Butler MP (Griffith)	Shadow Minister for the Environment and Water	
Madeleine King MP (Brand)	Shadow Minister for Trade; Shadow Minister for Resources	
Ed Husic MP (Chifley)	Shadow Minister for Industry and Innovation	

=== Outer shadow ministry ===
Shadow Minister	Portfolios	Portrait
Stephen Jones MP (Whitlam)	Shadow Assistant Treasurer; Shadow Minister for Financial Services and Superannuation	
Shayne Neumann MP (Blair)	Shadow Minister for Veterans’ Affairs and Defence Personnel	
Clare O’Neil MP (Hotham)	Shadow Minister for Senior Australians and Aged Care Services	
Pat Conroy MP (Shortland)	Shadow Minister for International Development and the Pacific; Shadow Minister Assisting for Climate Change; Shadow Minister Assisting for Defence; Shadow Minister Assisting for Government Accountability	
Andrew Giles MP (Scullin)	Shadow Minister for Cities and Urban Infrastructure; Shadow Minister for Multicultural Affairs; Shadow Minister Assisting for Immigration and Citizenship	
Matt Keogh MP (Burt)	Shadow Minister for Defence Industry; Shadow Minister Assisting for Small Business	
Senator Murray Watt (Queensland)	Shadow Minister for Northern Australia; Shadow Minister for Disaster and Emergency Management; Shadow Minister for Queensland Resources	

=== Assistant shadow ministers ===
Assistant Shadow Minister	Portfolios	Portrait
Jenny McAllister (New South Wales)	Shadow Cabinet Secretary; Shadow Assistant Minister to the Leader of the Opposition in the Senate; Shadow Assistant Minister for Communities and the Prevention of Family Violence	
Carol Brown (politician) (Tasmania)	Shadow Assistant Minister for Infrastructure and Regional Tourism; Shadow Assistant Minister for Tasmania	
Pat Dodson (Western Australia)	Shadow Assistant Minister for Reconciliation; Shadow Assistant Minister for Constitutional Recognition of Indigenous Australians	
Andrew Leigh MP (Fenner)	Shadow Assistant Minister for Treasury; Shadow Assistant Minister or Charities	
Warren Snowdon MP (Lingiari)	Shadow Assistant Minister for Northern Australia; Shadow Assistant Minister for Indigenous Australians; Shadow Assistant Minister for External Territories	
Graham Perrett MP (Moreton)	Shadow Assistant Minister for Education	
Emma McBride MP (Dobell)	Shadow Assistant Minister for Carers; Shadow Assistant Minister for Mental Health	
Glenn Sterle (Western Australia)	Shadow Assistant Minister for Road Safety	
Meryl Swanson MP (Paterson)	Shadow Assistant Minister for Defence	
Matt Thistlethwaite MP (Kingsford Smith)	Shadow Assistant Minister for Financial Services and Superannuation; Shadow Assistant Minister for the Republic	
Ged Kearney MP (Cooper)	Shadow Assistant Minister for Health and Ageing	
Josh Wilson MP (Fremantle)	Shadow Assistant Minister for the Environment	
Kimberley Kitching (Victoria)	Shadow Assistant Minister for Government Services and the NDIS; Deputy Manager of Opposition Business in the Senate	
Louise Pratt (Western Australia)	Shadow Assistant Minister for Employment and Skills; Shadow Assistant Minister for Manufacturing	
Tim Watts MP (Gellibrand)	Shadow Assistant Minister for Communications and Cyber Security	

== Shadow ministry (2019–2021) ==
Shadow Minister for Agriculture and Resources Joel Fitzgibbon resigned in November 2020. For a brief period until the January 2021 reshuffle, Ed Husic took over Fitzgibbon's portfolio.

=== Shadow Cabinet ===
Shadow Minister	Portfolios	Portrait
Anthony Albanese MP (Grayndler)	Leader of the Opposition; Leader of the Labor Party	
Richard Marles MP (Corio)	Deputy Leader of the Opposition; Deputy Leader of the Labor Party; Shadow Minister for Defence	
Senator Penny Wong (South Australia)	Leader of the Opposition in the Senate; Shadow Minister for Foreign Affairs	
Senator Kristina Keneally (New South Wales)	Deputy Leader of the Opposition in the Senate; Shadow Minister for Home Affairs; Shadow Minister for Immigration and Citizenship	
Tony Burke MP (Grayndler)	Manager of Opposition Business in the House; Shadow Minister for Industrial Relations; Shadow Minister for the Arts	
Bill Shorten MP (Maribyrnong)	Shadow Minister for the National Disability Insurance Scheme; Shadow Minister for Government Services	
Tanya Plibersek MP (Sydney)	Shadow Minister for Education and Training	
Jim Chalmers MP (Rankin)	Shadow Treasurer	
Mark Butler MP (Hindmarsh)	Deputy Manager of Opposition Business in the House; Shadow Minister for Climate Change and Energy	
Chris Bowen MP (McMahon)	Shadow Minister for Health	
Catherine King MP (Ballarat)	Shadow Minister for Infrastructure, Transport and Regional Development	
Joel Fitzgibbon MP (Hunter)	Shadow Minister for Agriculture	
Senator Don Farrell (South Australia)	Shadow Special Minister of State; Shadow Minister for Sport; Shadow Minister for Tourism; Shadow Minister Assisting the Leader of the Opposition	
Mark Dreyfus MP (Isaacs)	Shadow Attorney-General; Shadow Minister for Constitutional Reform	
Michelle Rowland MP (Greenway)	Shadow Minister for Communications	
Senator Katy Gallagher (ACT)	Shadow Minister for Finance; Shadow Minister for the Public Service; Manager of Opposition Business in the Senate	
Linda Burney MP (Barton)	Shadow Minister for Families and Social Services; Shadow Minister for Indigenous Australians	
Julie Collins MP (Franklin)	Shadow Minister for Women; Shadow Minister for Ageing and Seniors	
Brendan O’Connor MP (Gorton)	Shadow Minister for Employment and Industry; Shadow Minister for Science; Shadow Minister for Small and Family Business	
Jason Clare MP (Blaxland)	Shadow Minister for Regional Services, Territories and Local Government; Shadow Minister for Housing and Homelessness	
Amanda Rishworth MP (Kingston)	Shadow Minister for Early Childhood Education; Shadow Minister for Youth	
Terri Butler MP (Griffith)	Shadow Minister for the Environment and Water	
Madeleine King MP (Brand)	Shadow Minister for Trade	

=== Outer shadow ministry ===
Shadow Minister	Portfolios	Portrait
Stephen Jones MP (Whitlam)	Shadow Assistant Treasurer; Shadow Minister for Financial Services	
Shayne Neumann MP (Blair)	Shadow Minister for Veterans’ Affairs and Defence Personnel	
Clare O’Neil MP (Hotham)	Shadow Minister for Innovation, Technology and the Future of Work	
Pat Conroy MP (Shortland)	Shadow Minister for International Development and the Pacific; Shadow Minister Assisting for Climate Change; Shadow Minister Assisting for Defence	
Andrew Giles MP (Scullin)	Shadow Minister for Cities and Urban Infrastructure; Shadow Minister for Multicultural Affairs; Shadow Minister Assisting for Immigration and Citizenship	
Matt Keogh MP (Burt)	Shadow Minister for Defence Industry; Shadow Minister for Western Australian Resources; Shadow Minister Assisting for Small and Family Business	
Senator Murray Watt (Queensland)	Shadow Minister for Northern Australia; Shadow Minister for Natural Disasters and Emergency Management	

=== Shadow Assistant Ministers ===
Assistant Shadow Minister	Portfolios	Portrait
Jenny McAllister (New South Wales)	Shadow Cabinet Secretary; Shadow Assistant Minister to the Leader of the Opposition in the Senate	
Carol Brown (politician) (Tasmania)	Shadow Assistant Minister for Infrastructure and Regional Tourism; Shadow Assistant Minister for Tasmania	
Pat Dodson (Western Australia)	Shadow Assistant Minister for Reconciliation; Shadow Assistant Minister for Constitutional Recognition of Indigenous Australians	
Andrew Leigh MP (Fenner)	Shadow Assistant Minister for Treasury; Shadow Assistant Minister or Charities	
Warren Snowdon MP (Lingiari)	Shadow Assistant Minister for Northern Australia; Shadow Assistant Minister for Indigenous Australians; Shadow Assistant Minister for External Territories	
Graham Perrett MP (Moreton)	Shadow Assistant Minister for Education and Training	
Emma McBride MP (Dobell)	Shadow Assistant Minister for Carers; Shadow Assistant Minister for Mental Health	
Senator Glenn Sterle (Western Australia)	Shadow Assistant Minister for Road Safety	
Meryl Swanson MP (Paterson)	Shadow Assistant Minister for Defence	
Matt Thistlethwaite MP (Kingsford Smith)	Shadow Assistant Minister for Financial Services; Shadow Assistant Minister for the Republic	
Ged Kearney MP (Cooper)	Shadow Assistant Minister for Skills; Shadow Assistant Minister for Aged Care	
Josh Wilson MP (Fremantle)	Shadow Assistant Minister for the Environment	
Patrick Gorman MP (Perth)	Shadow Assistant Minister for Western Australia	
Kimberley Kitching (Victoria)	Shadow Assistant Minister for Government Accountability; Deputy Manager of Opposition Business in the Senate	
Louise Pratt (Western Australia)	Shadow Assistant Minister for Manufacturing	
Tim Watts MP (Gellibrand)	Shadow Assistant Minister for Communications; Shadow Assistant Minister for Cyber Security	
