= Second Albanese ministry =

74th ministry of the Government of Australia

- 74th Ministry of Australia

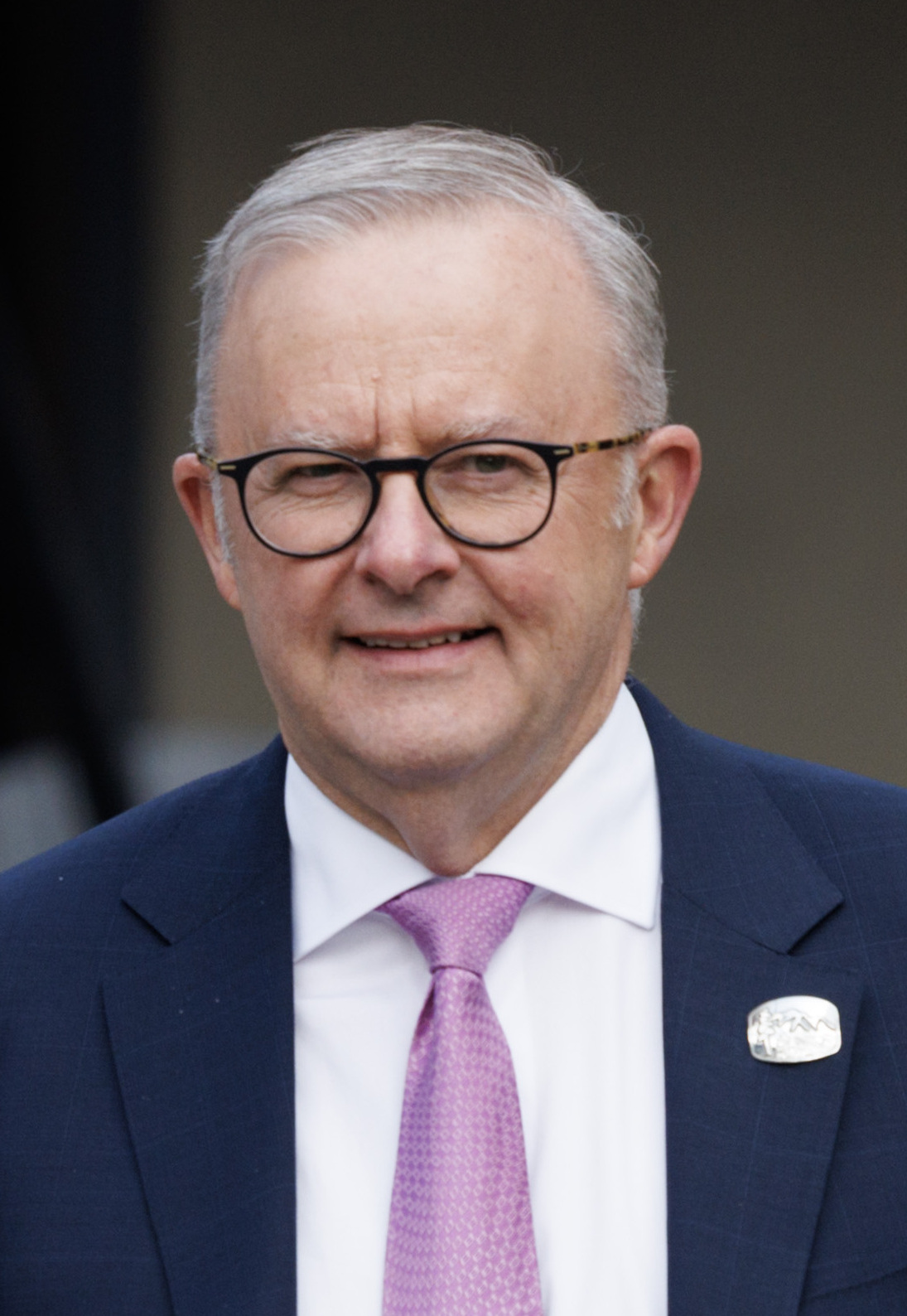
- Anthony Albanese in 2025
- Date formed: 13 May 2025

People and organisations
- Monarch: Charles III
- Governor-General: Sam Mostyn
- Prime Minister: Anthony Albanese
- Deputy Prime Minister: Richard Marles
- No. of ministers: 23 cabinet ministers; 7 junior ministers; 12 assistant ministers; 4 special envoys
- Member party: Labor
- Status in legislature: Majority government
- Opposition cabinet: Ley shadow ministry Taylor shadow ministry
- Opposition party: Liberal–National Coalition
- Opposition leader: Sussan Ley; Angus Taylor

History
- Election: 3 May 2025
- Legislature term: 48th
- Predecessor: First Albanese ministry

The second Albanese ministry is the 74th and current ministry of the Government of Australia. It is led by the country's 31st Prime Minister, Anthony Albanese. The second Albanese ministry succeeded the first Albanese ministry, following the federal election that took place on 3 May 2025 which saw Labor re-elected for a second term.

As Labor extended their majority in the House of Representatives, Albanese told the media that they "are overflowing with talent." The Guardian commented that with the party making massive gains in Queensland and consolidating its positive position in Victoria, the Prime Minister would have a "welcome headache" having to "manage internal pressure from some Labor members for ministerial promotions."

The ministry was announced on 12 May 2025, and was sworn in the next day.

== Arrangement ==
Media reports prior to a Labor caucus meeting on 9 May reported that the Labor Left faction selected senators Tim Ayres and Jess Walsh to replace departing First Albanese ministry ministers Bill Shorten and Stephen Jones, that the Victorian Right faction chose to replace First Albanese ministry attorney-general Mark Dreyfus's ministry spot with Sam Rae, and that First Albanese ministry science and industry minister Ed Husic was dropped due to an overrepresentation of the NSW Right faction in the ministry which has a legislated cap of 30 members excluding assistant ministers and special envoys. Other reports also indicated that Rebecca White and Daniel Mulino may receive roles.

The ministry was announced by Albanese on 12 May 2025. Anne Aly and Tim Ayres, who were respectively an outer minister and assistant minister in the previous ministry, were elevated to cabinet to replace Dreyfus and Husic's cabinet spots. Aly was appointed as small business, international development and multicultural affairs minister, replacing Julie Collins, Pat Conroy and Tony Burke respectively. Ayres was appointed as industry and science minister, replacing Husic. Collins retained her agriculture portfolio, Conroy retained his defence industry and Pacific Islands affairs portfolios, while Burke retained all of his other portfolios including home affairs and arts.

Michelle Rowland replaced Dreyfus as attorney-general. Anika Wells replaced Rowland as communications minister while retaining her sports portfolio. Tanya Plibersek replaced Amanda Rishworth as social services minister, Murray Watt replaced Plibersek as environment minister, and Rishworth replaced Watt as employment minister. Two ministers were appointed as NDIS ministers, with one in the cabinet and one in the outer ministry. The cabinet NDIS minister was health minister Mark Butler (retaining his health portfolio) and the outer ministry NDIS minister was Jenny McAllister. All other cabinet positions remained unchanged from the previous ministry.

In the outer ministry, local government minister Kristy McBain retained her portfolios but was additionally appointed as emergency management minister, replacing McAllister. Consistent with prior media reports, Daniel Mulino, Jess Walsh and Sam Rae were new additions to the outer ministry. Mulino was appointed as assistant treasurer and financial services minister, replacing Stephen Jones who had left parliament in the election. Walsh replaced Aly as early childhood education and youth minister, while Rae replaced Wells as aged care minister. The two remaining outer ministers from the previous ministry, Matt Keogh and Andrew Giles, retained their veteran affairs and skills portfolios respectively.

Rebecca White, Andrew Charlton, Nita Green and Peter Khalil were appointed to the ministry as assistant ministers.

Seven special envoys were also appointed, and these positions were considered separate from the ministry. Kate Thwaites and Tim Watts, who were assistant ministers in the previous ministry, were appointed as special envoys.

The ministry was sworn in on 13 May 2025 by governor-general Sam Mostyn.

On 26 August 2026, Special Envoy for Defence, Veterans' Affairs and Northern Australia Luke Gosling stepped down from the role to defend alleged assault charges that he was arrested for, and also alleged breaching bail charges.

=== Cabinet ===
Party	Faction	Minister	Portrait	Offices
Labor	Left	Anthony Albanese (born 1963) MP for Grayndler (NSW) (1996–)		Prime Minister; Leader of the Labor Party
Labor	Right	Richard Marles (born 1967) MP for Corio (Vic.) (2007–)		Deputy Prime Minister; Deputy Leader of the Labor Party; Minister for Defence
Labor	Left	Penny Wong (born 1968) Senator for South Australia (2002–)		Minister for Foreign Affairs; Leader of the Government in the Senate
Labor	Right	Dr Jim Chalmers (born 1978) MP for Rankin (Qld.) (2013–)		Treasurer
Labor	Left	Katy Gallagher (born 1970) Senator for the Australian Capital Territory (2019–)		Minister for Finance; Minister for the Public Service; Minister for Women; Minister for Government Services; Vice-President of the Executive Council; Manager of Government Business in the Senate
Labor	Right	Don Farrell (born 1954) Senator for South Australia (2016–)		Minister for Trade and Tourism; Special Minister of State; Deputy Leader of the Government in the Senate
Labor	Right	Tony Burke (born 1969) MP for Watson (NSW) (2004–)		Minister for Home Affairs; Minister for Immigration and Citizenship; Minister for Cyber Security; Minister for the Arts; Leader of the House
Labor	Left	Mark Butler (born 1970) MP for Hindmarsh (SA) (2019–)		Minister for Health and Ageing; Minister for Disability and the National Disability Insurance Scheme; Deputy Leader of the House
Labor	Right	Chris Bowen (born 1973) MP for McMahon (NSW) (2010–)		Minister for Climate Change and Energy
Labor	Left	Catherine King (born 1966) MP for Ballarat (Vic.) (2001–)		Minister for Infrastructure, Transport, Regional Development and Local Government
Labor	Right	Amanda Rishworth (born 1978) MP for Kingston (SA) (2007–)		Minister for Employment and Workplace Relations
Labor	Right	Jason Clare (born 1972) MP for Blaxland (NSW) (2007–)		Minister for Education
Labor	Right	Michelle Rowland (born 1971) MP for Greenway (NSW) (2010–)		Attorney-General
Labor	Left	Tanya Plibersek (born 1969) MP for Sydney (NSW) (1998–)		Minister for Social Services
Labor	Left	Julie Collins (born 1971) MP for Franklin (Tas.) (2007–)		Minister for Agriculture, Fisheries and Forestry
Labor	Right	Clare O'Neil (born 1980) MP for Hotham (Vic.) (2013–)		Minister for Housing; Minister for Homelessness; Minister for Cities
Labor	Right	Madeleine King (born 1973) MP for Brand (WA) (2016–)		Minister for Resources; Minister for Northern Australia
Labor	Left	Murray Watt (born 1973) Senator for Queensland (2016–)		Minister for the Environment and Water
Labor	Left	Malarndirri McCarthy (born 1970) Senator for Northern Territory (2016–)		Minister for Indigenous Australians
Labor	Right	Anika Wells (born 1985) MP for Lilley (Qld.) (2019–)		Minister for Communications; Minister for Sport
Labor	Left	Pat Conroy (born 1979) MP for Shortland (NSW) (2016–)		Minister for Defence Industry; Minister for Pacific Island Affairs
Labor	Left	Anne Aly (born 1967) MP for Cowan (WA) (2016–)		Minister for Small Business; Minister for International Development; Minister for Multicultural Affairs
Labor	Left	Tim Ayres (born 1973) Senator for New South Wales (2019–)		Minister for Industry and Innovation; Minister for Science

=== Outer ministry ===
Party	Faction	Minister	Portrait	Offices
Labor	Right	Matt Keogh (born 1981) MP for Burt (WA) (2016–)		Minister for Veterans' Affairs; Minister for Defence Personnel
Labor	Right	Kristy McBain (born 1982) MP for Eden-Monaro (NSW) (2020–)		Minister for Regional Development, Local Government and Territories; Minister for Emergency Management
Labor	Left	Andrew Giles (born 1973) MP for Scullin (Vic.) (2013–)		Minister for Skills and Training
Labor	Left	Jenny McAllister (born 1973) Senator for New South Wales (2015–)		Minister for the National Disability Insurance Scheme
Labor	Right	Daniel Mulino (born 1969) MP for Fraser (Vic.) (2019–)		Assistant Treasurer; Minister for Financial Services
Labor	Left	Jess Walsh (born 1971) Senator for Victoria (2019–)		Minister for Early Childhood Education; Minister for Youth
Labor	Right	Sam Rae (born 1986) MP for Hawke (Vic.) (2022–)		Minister for Aged Care and Seniors

=== Assistant ministry ===
Party	Faction	Assistant Minister	Portrait	Offices
Labor	Left	Patrick Gorman (born 1984) MP for Perth (WA) (2018–)		Assistant Minister to the Prime Minister; Assistant Minister for the Public Service; Assistant Minister for Employment and Workplace Relations
Labor	Right	Matt Thistlethwaite (born 1972) MP for Kingsford Smith (NSW) (2013–)		Assistant Minister for Immigration; Assistant Minister for Foreign Affairs and Trade
Labor	Unaligned	Andrew Leigh (born 1972) MP for Fenner (ACT) (2016–)		Assistant Minister for Productivity, Competition, Charities and Treasury
Labor	Left	Ged Kearney (born 1963) MP for Cooper (Vic.) (2019–)		Assistant Minister for Social Services; Assistant Minister for the Prevention of Family Violence
Labor	Right	Emma McBride (born 1975) MP for Dobell (NSW) (2016–)		Assistant Minister for Mental Health and Suicide Prevention; Assistant Minister for Rural and Regional Health
Labor	Right	Anthony Chisholm (born 1978) Senator for Queensland (2016–)		Assistant Minister for Resources; Assistant Minister for Regional Development; Assistant Minister for Agriculture, Fisheries and Forestry
Labor	Left	Josh Wilson (born 1972) MP for Fremantle (WA) (2016–)		Assistant Minister for Climate Change and Energy; Assistant Minister for Emergency Management
Labor	Left	Julian Hill (born 1973) MP for Bruce (Vic.) (2016–)		Assistant Minister for Citizenship, Customs and Multicultural Affairs; Assistant Minister for International Education
Labor	Left	Rebecca White (born 1983) MP for Lyons (Tas.) (2025–)		Assistant Minister for Health and Aged Care; Assistant Minister for Indigenous Health; Assistant Minister for Women
Labor	Right	Andrew Charlton (born 1978) MP for Parramatta (NSW) (2022–)		Cabinet Secretary; Assistant Minister for Science, Technology and the Digital Economy
Labor	Left	Nita Green (born 1983) Senator for Queensland (2019–)		Assistant Minister for Northern Australia; Assistant Minister for Tourism; Assistant Minister for Pacific Island Affairs
Labor	Right	Peter Khalil (born 1973) MP for Wills (Vic.) (2016–)		Assistant Minister for Defence

=== Special envoys ===
Party	Faction	Special Envoy	Portrait	Offices
Labor	Left	Susan Templeman (born 1963) MP for Macquarie (NSW) (2016–)		Special Envoy for the Arts
Labor	Right	Luke Gosling (born 1971) MP for Solomon (NT) (2016–)		Special Envoy for Defence, Veterans' Affairs and Northern Australia
Labor	Right	Dan Repacholi (born 1982) MP for Hunter (NSW) (2022–)		Special Envoy for Men's Health
Labor	Right	Josh Burns (born 1987) MP for Macnamara (Vic.) (2019–)		Special Envoy for Social Housing and Homelessness
Labor	Left	Marion Scrymgour (born 1960) MP for Lingiari (NT) (2022–)		Special Envoy for Remote Communities
Labor	Left	Kate Thwaites (born 1980) MP for Jagajaga (Vic.) (2019–)		Special Envoy for Climate Change Adaptation and Resilience
Labor	Right	Tim Watts (born 1982) MP for Gellibrand (Vic.) (2013–)		Special Envoy for Indian Ocean Affairs
Labor	Right	Mark Dreyfus KC (born 1956) MP for Isaacs (2007–)		Special Envoy for International Human Rights (from 28 November 2025)

== See also ==
- 2025 Australian federal election
- Albanese government
