= National Recovery and Resilience Agency =

Australian government agency

Agency overview
- Formed: 5 May 2021
- Preceding agencies: National Bushfire Recovery Agency; National Drought and North Queensland Flood Response and Recovery Agency
- Dissolved: 1 September 2022
- Superseding Agency: National Emergency Management Agency
- Jurisdiction: Australia
- Minister responsible: Murray Watt, Minister for Emergency Management
- Agency executive: Shane Stone AC, QC, Coordinator-General
- Parent department: Department of Home Affairs
- Website: recovery.gov.au

The National Recovery and Resilience Agency (NRRA) was an Australian government executive agency to help those affected by natural disasters, including droughts, bushfires, and floods. It was an agency of the Department of Home Affairs from 1 July 2022 until it was replaced by the National Emergency Management Agency (NEMA) in September 2022. Before this, it was an agency of the Department of the Prime Minister and Cabinet.

The agency was formed on 5 May 2021 from the merger of the National Bushfire Recovery Agency and the National Drought and North Queensland Flood Response and Recovery Agency, in response to the Royal Commission into National Natural Disaster Arrangements. On 1 July 2021, transition into the new agency was complete with the incorporation of disaster risk reduction and recovery functions from the Department of Home Affairs, and rural financial counseling program from the Department of Agriculture, Water and the Environment.

The agency was led by its sole Coordinator-General, Shane Stone AC, QC, who was also previously head of the National Drought and North Queensland Flood Response and Recovery Agency and its predecessor North Queensland Livestock Industry Recovery Agency. The Minister for Emergency Management, currently Murray Watt, holds ministerial responsibility for the agency. In July 2022, the Albanese government announced that it would recommend the Governor-General to merge the agency and Emergency Management Australia on 1 September 2022 to form a new agency, which would later be known as National Emergency Management Agency. Following the announcement, Stone took leave and left the agency on 31 August. The Chief Operating Officer for the Department of Home Affairs, Justine Saunders APM, was the acting Coordinator-General until the new agency was formed.

== Preceding agencies ==
=== National Bushfire Recovery Agency ===
On 5 January 2020, the creation of the National Bushfire Recovery Agency was announced by Prime Minister Scott Morrison during the 2019–20 bushfire season and following some of the worst effects of the fires during that season. It was set to run for two years, funded with $2 billion. The agency was intended to provide help and support to people who have lost their homes and businesses as a result of the fires. The agency was headed by Andrew Colvin APM, OAM, a former Commissioner of the Australian Federal Police.

=== National Drought and North Queensland Flood Response and Recovery Agency ===
On 1 March 2019, the North Queensland Livestock Industry Recovery Agency (NQLIRA) was created to help in flood recovery following the North Queensland floods. In December 2019, North Queensland Livestock Industry Recovery Agency was expanded to include drought and renamed into a new National Drought and North Queensland Flood Response and Recovery Agency.

== See also ==
- List of Australian government entities
