= First Albanese ministry =

73rd ministry of the Government of Australia

- 73rd Ministry of Australia

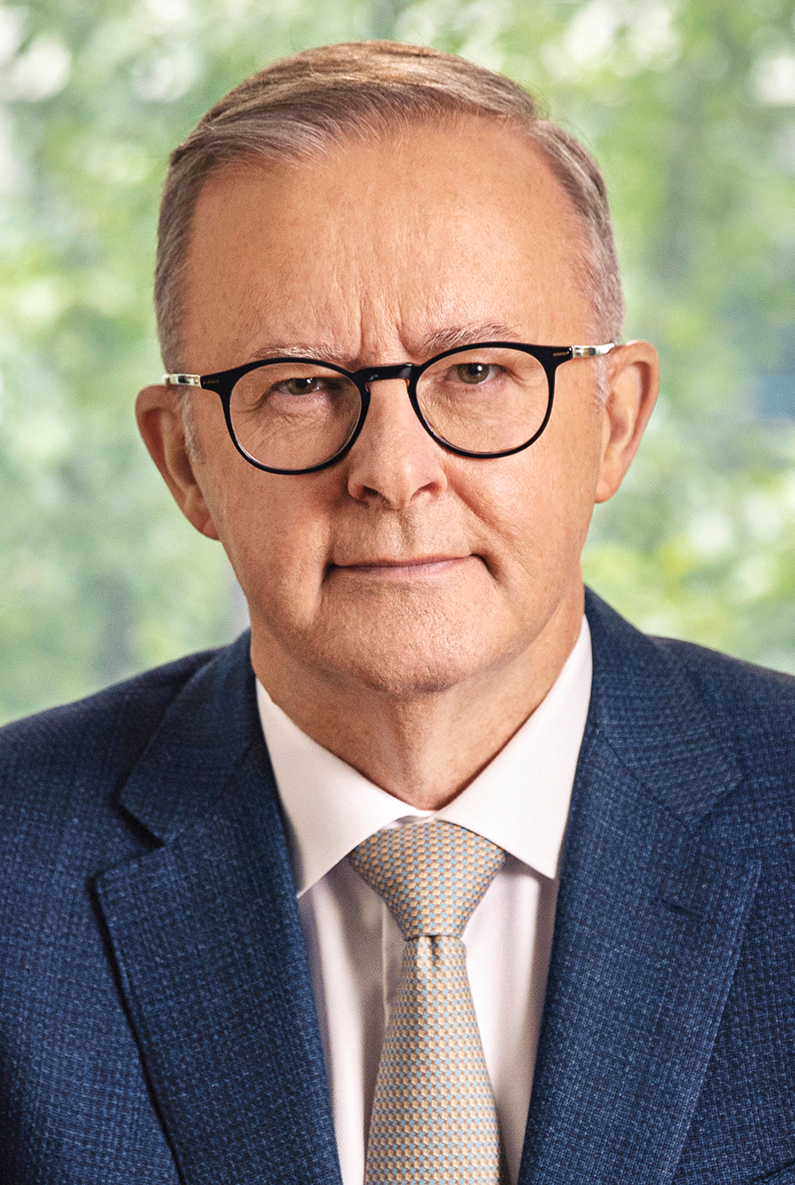
- Anthony Albanese
- Date formed: 23 May 2022
- Date dissolved: 13 May 2025

People and organisations
- Monarch: Elizabeth II; Charles III
- Governor-General: David Hurley; Sam Mostyn
- Prime Minister: Anthony Albanese
- Deputy Prime Minister: Richard Marles
- No. of ministers: 23 cabinet ministers; 6 junior ministers; 12 assistant ministers; 4 special envoys
- Member party: Labor
- Status in legislature: Majority government
- Opposition cabinet: Dutton shadow ministry
- Opposition party: Liberal–National coalition
- Opposition leader: Peter Dutton

History
- Election: 21 May 2022
- Legislature term: 47th
- Predecessor: Second Morrison ministry
- Successor: Second Albanese ministry

The first Albanese ministry was the 73rd ministry of the Government of Australia. It was led by the country's 31st Prime Minister, Anthony Albanese. The Albanese ministry succeeded the second Morrison ministry, which resigned on 23 May 2022 following the federal election that took place on 21 May which saw Labor defeat Scott Morrison's Liberal–National Coalition.

Although counting was still underway on election night, most media outlets projected that due to severe losses by Morrison's Liberal/National Coalition, Labor was the only party that could realistically form even a minority government. Accordingly, Morrison conceded defeat to Albanese late on election night. Soon afterward, in accordance with longstanding Australian constitutional practice, he advised the Governor-General, David Hurley, that he was no longer in a position to govern. Normally, Morrison would have stayed on as caretaker Prime Minister until the final results were known. As the Quadrilateral Security Dialogue was due to be held on 24 May 2022, Albanese advised Hurley that he could form a government. Hurley then swore in Albanese and four senior Labor frontbenchers as an interim five-person ministry on 23 May, two days after the election. According to ABC News, Hurley would not have invited Albanese to form a government without assurances that Labor could provide stable government, as well as legal advice that this was the proper course of action. According to the Australian Financial Review, Albanese had secured enough support from crossbenchers to be able to govern in the event Labor fell short of a majority. On 30 May 2022, Australian media outlets projected that Labor had won enough seats in the House of Representatives to become a majority government.

After the swearing-in of the interim arrangement, during his first press conference as prime minister, Albanese announced that his first full ministry would be sworn in on 1 June 2022. The members of the ministry were announced on 31 May and sworn in the following day.

Following Labor's re-election at the 2025 federal election, the ministry was succeeded by the second Albanese ministry on 13 May 2025.

== Final arrangement (2024–2025) ==
Albanese announced on 25 July 2024 that he would refresh his ministry after two cabinet ministers, indigenous affairs minister Linda Burney and skills minister Brendan O'Connor announced that they would retire at the 2025 Australian federal election, and also immediately step down from the ministry. On 27 July 2024, Carol Brown also announced she would step down from the assistant ministry for health reasons.

Albanese announced the new ministry on 28 July 2024. Malarndirri McCarthy and Jenny McAllister were selected unopposed by their Labor Left faction to replace Burney and O'Connor as ministers. McCarthy and Pat Conroy were elevated to cabinet. McCarthy, who was previously the assistant indigenous affairs minister, was appointed as the new indigenous affairs minister, while there were no changes to Conroy's portfolios (defence industry and international development). Tony Burke gained the home affairs, cyber security and immigration portfolios from Clare O'Neil and Andrew Giles, while retaining his arts minister portfolio and his position as Leader of the House. Burke's previous employment portfolio was gained by Murray Watt. Watt's agriculture portfolio was given to Julie Collins, which Collins previously held while in opposition. Collins retained her small businesses portfolio while losing the housing and homelessness portfolios to O'Neil.

Giles succeeded O'Connor as skills minister and remained in the outer ministry. Jenny McAllister was promoted to the outer ministry and was appointed as cities minister and emergency services minister, taking over the latter portfolio from Watt.

Kate Thwaites, Josh Wilson and Julian Hill were new additions to the assistant ministry, with Thwaites and Hill having new portfolios, while Wilson succeeded McAllister as assistant climate change minister. McCarthy's previous role as assistant indigenous affairs minister and Brown's previous role as assistant infrastructure and transport minister were not replaced, while McCarthy's role as assistant indigenous health minister was gained by assistant health minister Ged Kearney. Three other assistant ministers also gained new portfolios in addition to their existing ones: Patrick Gorman as Assistant Minister to the Attorney-General, Tim Ayres as Assistant Minister for a Future Made In Australia, and Anthony Chisholm as Assistant Minister for Agriculture, Fisheries and Forestry. Matt Thistlethwaite was appointed as Assistant Minister for Immigration, with his previous portfolios removed without replacement.

The new ministry was sworn in the following day on 29 July 2024.

In a reshuffle announced on the 16 January 2025 prompted by the retirement of cabinet minister Bill Shorten, Anika Wells was elevated to cabinet while Shorten's portfolios were given to cabinet ministers Amanda Rishworth (NDIS) and Katy Gallagher (Government Services). Outer minister Anne Aly was also given the role of minister assisting the NDIS minister. The reshuffle took effect on 20 January 2025.

=== Cabinet ===
Party	Faction	Minister	Portrait	Offices
Labor	Left	Anthony Albanese (born 1963) MP for Grayndler (1996–)		Prime Minister; Leader of the Labor Party
Labor	Right	Richard Marles (born 1967) MP for Corio (2007–)		Deputy Prime Minister; Deputy Leader of the Labor Party; Minister for Defence
Labor	Left	Penny Wong (born 1968) Senator for South Australia (2002–)		Minister for Foreign Affairs; Leader of the Government in the Senate
Labor	Right	Jim Chalmers (born 1978) MP for Rankin (2013–)		Treasurer
Labor	Left	Katy Gallagher (born 1970) Senator for the Australian Capital Territory (2019–)		Minister for Finance; Minister for the Public Service; Minister for Women; Minister for Government Services (since 20 January 2025); Vice-President of the Executive Council; Manager of Government Business in the Senate
Labor	Right	Don Farrell (born 1954) Senator for South Australia (2016–)		Minister for Trade and Tourism; Special Minister of State; Deputy Leader of the Government in the Senate
Labor	Right	Tony Burke (born 1969) MP for Watson (2004–)		Minister for Home Affairs; Minister for Immigration and Multicultural Affairs; Minister for Cyber Security; Minister for the Arts; Leader of the House
Labor	Left	Mark Butler (born 1970) MP for Hindmarsh (2019–)		Minister for Health and Aged Care; Deputy Leader of the House
Labor	Right	Chris Bowen (born 1973) MP for McMahon (2010–)		Minister for Climate Change and Energy
Labor	Left	Tanya Plibersek (born 1969) MP for Sydney (1998–)		Minister for the Environment and Water
Labor	Left	Catherine King (born 1966) MP for Ballarat (2001–)		Minister for Infrastructure, Transport, Regional Development and Local Government
Labor	Right	Amanda Rishworth (born 1978) MP for Kingston (2007–)		Minister for Social Services; Minister for the National Disability Insurance Scheme (since 20 January 2025)
Labor	Right	Mark Dreyfus KC (born 1956) MP for Isaacs (2007–)		Attorney-General; Cabinet Secretary
Labor	Right	Jason Clare (born 1972) MP for Blaxland (2007–)		Minister for Education
Labor	Left	Julie Collins (born 1971) MP for Franklin (2007–)		Minister for Agriculture, Fisheries and Forestry; Minister for Small Business
Labor	Right	Michelle Rowland (born 1971) MP for Greenway (2010–)		Minister for Communications
Labor	Right	Madeleine King (born 1973) MP for Brand (2016–)		Minister for Resources; Minister for Northern Australia
Labor	Right	Ed Husic (born 1970) MP for Chifley (2010–)		Minister for Industry and Science
Labor	Left	Murray Watt (born 1973) Senator for Queensland (2016–)		Minister for Employment and Workplace Relations
Labor	Right	Clare O'Neil (born 1980) MP for Hotham (2013–)		Minister for Housing; Minister for Homelessness
Labor	Left	Malarndirri McCarthy (born 1970) Senator for Northern Territory (2016–)		Minister for Indigenous Australians
Labor	Left	Pat Conroy (born 1979) MP for Shortland (2016–)		Minister for Defence Industry and Capability Delivery; Minister for International Development and the Pacific
Labor	Right	Anika Wells (born 1985) MP for Lilley (2019–)		Elevated to cabinet on 20 January 2025: Minister for Aged Care; Minister for Sport
Former Cabinet Ministers
Labor	Right	Bill Shorten (born 1967) MP for Maribyrnong (2007–2025)		Minister for the National Disability Insurance Scheme (until 20 January 2025); Minister for Government Services (until 20 January 2025)

=== Outer ministry ===
Party	Minister	Portrait	Offices
Labor	Matt Keogh (born 1981) MP for Burt (2016–)		Minister for Veterans' Affairs; Minister for Defence Personnel
Labor	Stephen Jones (born 1965) MP for Whitlam (2016–)		Assistant Treasurer; Minister for Financial Services
Labor	Andrew Giles (born 1973) MP for Scullin (2013–)		Minister for Skills and Training
Labor	Anne Aly (born 1967) MP for Cowan (2016–)		Minister for Early Childhood Education; Minister for Youth; Minister Assisting the Minister for the National Disability Insurance Scheme (since 20 January 2025)
Labor	Kristy McBain (born 1982) MP for Eden-Monaro (2020–)		Minister for Regional Development, Local Government and Territories
Labor	Jenny McAllister (born 1973) Senator for New South Wales (2015–)		Minister for Cities; Minister for Emergency Management
Former Outer Minister
Labor	Anika Wells (born 1985) MP for Lilley (2019–)		Elevated to cabinet on 20 January 2025: Minister for Aged Care; Minister for Sport

=== Assistant ministry ===
Party	Minister	Portrait	Offices
Labor	Justine Elliot (born 1967) MP for Richmond (2004–)		Assistant Minister for Social Services; Assistant Minister for the Prevention of Family Violence
Labor	Matt Thistlethwaite (born 1972) MP for Kingsford Smith (2013–)		Assistant Minister for Immigration
Labor	Andrew Leigh (born 1972) MP for Fenner (2016–)		Assistant Minister for Competition, Charities and Treasury; Assistant Minister for Employment
Labor	Patrick Gorman (born 1984) MP for Perth (2018–)		Assistant Minister to the Prime Minister; Assistant Minister for the Public Service; Assistant Minister to the Attorney-General
Labor	Ged Kearney (born 1963) MP for Cooper (2019–)		Assistant Minister for Health and Aged Care; Assistant Minister for Indigenous Health
Labor	Emma McBride (born 1975) MP for Dobell (2016–)		Assistant Minister for Mental Health and Suicide Prevention; Assistant Minister for Rural and Regional Health
Labor	Tim Ayres (born 1973) Senator for New South Wales (2019–)		Assistant Minister for a Future Made In Australia; Assistant Minister for Trade
Labor	Anthony Chisholm (born 1978) Senator for Queensland (2016–)		Assistant Minister for Education; Assistant Minister for Regional Development; Assistant Minister for Agriculture, Fisheries and Forestry; Deputy Manager of Government Business in the Senate
Labor	Tim Watts (born 1982) MP for Gellibrand (2013–)		Assistant Minister for Foreign Affairs
Labor	Kate Thwaites (born 1980) MP for Jagajaga (2019–)		Assistant Minister for Social Security; Assistant Minister for Ageing; Assistant Minister for Women
Labor	Josh Wilson (born 1972) MP for Fremantle (2016–)		Assistant Minister for Climate Change and Energy
Labor	Julian Hill MP for Bruce (2016–)		Assistant Minister for Citizenship and Multicultural Affairs

=== Special envoys ===
Special envoys are additional roles that are not part of the ministry, but have been included here because of their status.

Party	Minister	Portrait	Position title
Labor	Nita Green (born 1983) Senator for Queensland (2019–)		Special Envoy for the Great Barrier Reef
Labor	Susan Templeman (born 1963) MP for Macquarie (2016–)		Special Envoy for the Arts
Labor	Tony Sheldon (born 1961) Senator for New South Wales (2019–)		Special Envoy for Disaster Recovery
Labor	Peter Khalil (born 1973) MP for Wills (2016–)		Special Envoy for Social Cohesion
Labor	Luke Gosling (born 1971) MP for Solomon (2016–)		Special Envoy for Defence, Veterans’ Affairs and Northern Australia
Labor	Andrew Charlton (born 1978) MP for Parramatta (2022–)		Special Envoy for Cyber Security and Digital Resilience

== First arrangement (2022–2024) ==
Albanese announced the composition of the full ministry on 31 May 2022. As Labor frontbenchers Kristina Keneally and Terri Butler lost their seats in the election, Clare O'Neil and Murray Watt were chosen by Albanese as replacements in cabinet while the caucus chose Anne Aly, Anika Wells and Kristy McBain to replace them as ministers. The ministry was sworn in on 1 June 2022.

Tony Sheldon was later appointed on the 24 July 2022 as the Special Envoy for Disaster Recovery while Pat Dodson left his role as Special Envoy for Reconciliation and Implementation of the Uluru Statement from the Heart when he retired on 26 January 2024. On 31 May 2023, assistant ministers Patrick Gorman and Andrew Leigh were additionally appointed Assistant Minister for the Public Service and Assistant Minister for Employment respectively.

=== Cabinet ===
Party	Faction	Minister	Portrait	Offices
Labor	Left	Anthony Albanese (born 1963) MP for Grayndler (1996–)		Prime Minister; Leader of the Labor Party
Labor	Right	Richard Marles (born 1967) MP for Corio (2007–)		Deputy Prime Minister; Deputy Leader of the Labor Party; Minister for Defence
Labor	Left	Penny Wong (born 1968) Senator for South Australia (2002–)		Minister for Foreign Affairs; Leader of the Government in the Senate
Labor	Right	Jim Chalmers (born 1978) MP for Rankin (2013–)		Treasurer
Labor	Left	Katy Gallagher (born 1970) Senator for the Australian Capital Territory (2019–)		Minister for Finance; Minister for the Public Service; Minister for Women; Vice-President of the Executive Council; Manager of Government Business in the Senate
Labor	Right	Don Farrell (born 1954) Senator for South Australia (2016-)		Minister for Trade and Tourism; Special Minister of State; Deputy Leader of the Government in the Senate
Labor	Right	Tony Burke (born 1969) MP for Watson (2004–)		Minister for Employment and Workplace Relations; Minister for the Arts; Leader of the House
Labor	Left	Mark Butler (born 1970) MP for Hindmarsh (2019–)		Minister for Health and Aged Care; Deputy Leader of the House
Labor	Right	Chris Bowen (born 1973) MP for McMahon (2010–)		Minister for Climate Change and Energy
Labor	Left	Tanya Plibersek (born 1969) MP for Sydney (1998–)		Minister for the Environment and Water
Labor	Left	Catherine King (born 1966) MP for Ballarat (2001–)		Minister for Infrastructure, Transport, Regional Development and Local Government
Labor	Right	Amanda Rishworth (born 1978) MP for Kingston (2007–)		Minister for Social Services
Labor	Right	Bill Shorten (born 1967) MP for Maribyrnong (2007–)		Minister for the National Disability Insurance Scheme; Minister for Government Services
Labor	Left	Linda Burney (born 1957) MP for Barton (2016–)		Minister for Indigenous Australians
Labor	Right	Mark Dreyfus KC (born 1956) MP for Isaacs (2007–)		Attorney-General; Cabinet Secretary
Labor	Left	Brendan O'Connor (born 1962) MP for Gorton (2004–)		Minister for Skills and Training
Labor	Right	Jason Clare (born 1972) MP for Blaxland (2007–)		Minister for Education
Labor	Left	Julie Collins (born 1971) MP for Franklin (2007–)		Minister for Housing; Minister for Homelessness; Minister for Small Business
Labor	Right	Michelle Rowland (born 1971) MP for Greenway (2010–)		Minister for Communications
Labor	Right	Madeleine King (born 1973) MP for Brand (2016–)		Minister for Resources; Minister for Northern Australia
Labor	Left	Murray Watt (born 1973) Senator for Queensland (2016–)		Minister for Agriculture, Fisheries and Forestry; Minister for Emergency Management
Labor	Right	Ed Husic (born 1970) MP for Chifley (2010–)		Minister for Industry and Science
Labor	Right	Clare O'Neil (born 1980) MP for Hotham (2013-)		Minister for Home Affairs; Minister for Cyber Security

=== Outer ministry ===
Party	Minister	Portrait	Offices
Labor	Matt Keogh (born 1981) MP for Burt (2016–)		Minister for Veterans' Affairs; Minister for Defence Personnel
Labor	Pat Conroy (born 1979) MP for Shortland (2016–)		Minister for Defence Industry and Capability Delivery; Minister for International Development and the Pacific
Labor	Stephen Jones (born 1965) MP for Whitlam (2016–)		Assistant Treasurer; Minister for Financial Services
Labor	Andrew Giles (born 1973) MP for Scullin (2013–)		Minister for Immigration, Citizenship and Multicultural Affairs
Labor	Anne Aly (born 1967) MP for Cowan (2016–)		Minister for Early Childhood Education; Minister for Youth
Labor	Anika Wells (born 1985) MP for Lilley (2019–)		Minister for Aged Care; Minister for Sport
Labor	Kristy McBain (born 1982) MP for Eden-Monaro (2020–)		Minister for Regional Development, Local Government and Territories

=== Assistant ministry ===
Party	Minister	Portrait	Offices
Labor	Justine Elliot (born 1967) MP for Richmond (2004–)		Assistant Minister for Social Services; Assistant Minister for the Prevention of Family Violence
Labor	Matt Thistlethwaite (born 1972) MP for Kingsford Smith (2013–)		Assistant Minister for Defence; Assistant Minister for Veterans' Affairs; Assistant Minister for the Republic
Labor	Andrew Leigh (born 1972) MP for Fenner (2016–)		Assistant Minister for Competition, Charities and Treasury; Assistant Minister for Employment (from 31 May 2023)
Labor	Patrick Gorman (born 1984) MP for Perth (2018–)		Assistant Minister to the Prime Minister; Assistant Minister for the Public Service (from 31 May 2023)
Labor	Jenny McAllister (born 1973) Senator for New South Wales (2015–)		Assistant Minister for Climate Change and Energy
Labor	Carol Brown (born 1963) Senator for Tasmania (2005–)		Assistant Minister for Infrastructure and Transport
Labor	Ged Kearney (born 1963) MP for Cooper (2019–)		Assistant Minister for Health and Aged Care
Labor	Emma McBride (born 1975) MP for Dobell (2016–)		Assistant Minister for Mental Health and Suicide Prevention; Assistant Minister for Rural and Regional Health
Labor	Malarndirri McCarthy (born 1970) Senator for the Northern Territory (2016–)		Assistant Minister for Indigenous Australians; Assistant Minister for Indigenous Health
Labor	Tim Ayres (born 1973) Senator for New South Wales (2019–)		Assistant Minister for Trade; Assistant Minister for Manufacturing
Labor	Anthony Chisholm (born 1978) Senator for Queensland (2016–)		Assistant Minister for Education; Assistant Minister for Regional Development; Deputy Manager of Government Business in the Senate
Labor	Tim Watts (born 1982) MP for Gellibrand (2013–)		Assistant Minister for Foreign Affairs

=== Special envoys ===
Special envoys are additional roles that are not part of the ministry, but have been included here because of their status.

Party	Minister	Portrait	Position title
Labor	Pat Dodson (born 1948) Senator for Western Australia (2016–2024)		Special Envoy for Reconciliation and Implementation of the Uluru Statement from the Heart (until 2024)
Labor	Nita Green (born 1983) Senator for Queensland (2019–)		Special Envoy for the Great Barrier Reef
Labor	Susan Templeman (born 1963) MP for Macquarie (2016–)		Special Envoy for the Arts
Labor	Tony Sheldon (born 1961) Senator for New South Wales (2019–)		Special Envoy for Disaster Recovery (from 24 July 2022)

== Initial arrangement ==
In the interim five-person ministry sworn in on 23 May 2022, Albanese was sworn in as Prime Minister, Labor deputy leader Richard Marles as Deputy Prime Minister and Minister for Employment, Jim Chalmers as Treasurer, Senator Penny Wong as Minister for Foreign Affairs, and Senator Katy Gallagher as Minister for Finance, Minister for Women, Attorney-General, and Vice-President of the Executive Council. Gallagher would only hold the position of attorney-general for the duration of the interim ministry. The interim ministry would also cover all other portfolios and the sworn-in ministers would be acting ministers for those portfolios. For example, Gallagher and Chalmers were also acting health minister and interim home affairs minister respectively.

Party	Minister	Portrait	Offices
Labor	Anthony Albanese (1963–) MP for Grayndler (1996–)		Prime Minister; Leader of the Labor Party
Labor	Richard Marles (1967–) MP for Corio (2007–)		Deputy Prime Minister; Deputy Leader of the Labor Party; Minister for Employment
Labor	Penny Wong (1968–) Senator for South Australia (2002–)		Minister for Foreign Affairs
Labor	Jim Chalmers (1978–) MP for Rankin (2013–)		Treasurer
Labor	Katy Gallagher (1970–) Senator for the Australian Capital Territory (2019–)		Minister for Finance; Minister for Women; Attorney-General; Vice-President of the Executive Council

== Geographical breakdown ==
Geographic breakdown of the ministry (as of 29 July 2024), per House of Representatives electorate and state/territory represented in the Senate:

State/territory	Ministers	Assistant ministers	Special envoys	Total
New South Wales	11	4	3	18
Victoria	6	4	1	11
South Australia	4	—N/a	—N/a	4
Queensland	3	1	1	5
Western Australia	3	2	—N/a	5
Tasmania	1	—N/a	—N/a	1
Australian Capital Territory	1	1	—N/a	2
Northern Territory	1	—N/a	1	2
Total	30	12	6	48

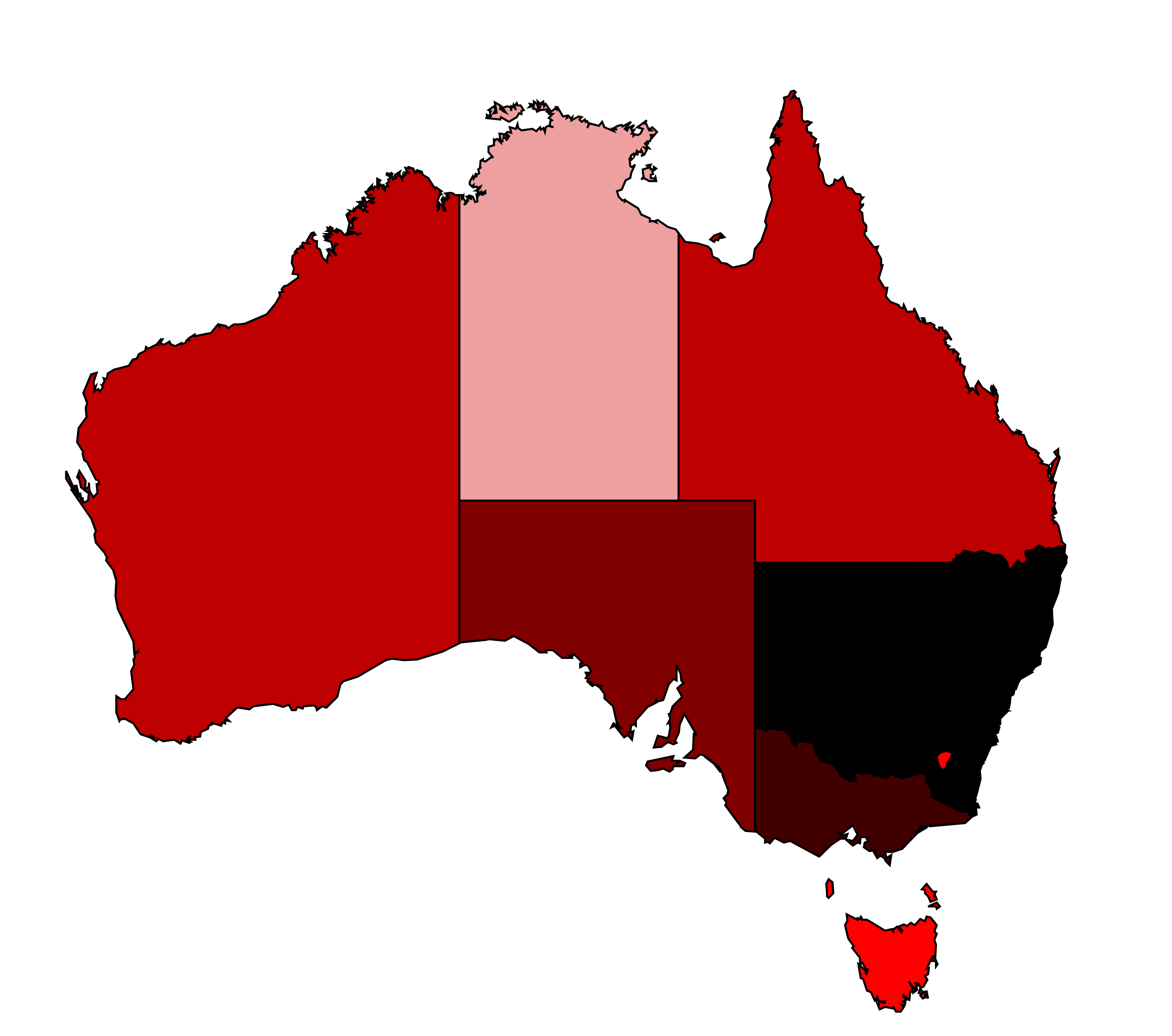
Concentration of ministers, assistant ministers and special envoys by state (as of July 2022)

== See also ==
- 2022 Australian federal election
- Albanese government
