= Albanese ministry =

Albanese ministry may refer to:

- First Albanese ministry (2022–2025), the 73rd ministry of the Government of Australia
- Second Albanese ministry (from 2025), the 74th ministry of the Government of Australia
