= National Emergency Management Agency (Australia) =

Australian government agency

- Logo of the National Emergency Management Agency

Agency overview
- Formed: 1 September 2022
- Preceding agencies: National Recovery and Resilience Agency; Emergency Management Australia
- Jurisdiction: Australia
- Minister responsible: Kristy McBain, Minister for Emergency Management
- Agency executive: Pat Hetherington, Interim Coordinator-General
- Parent department: Department of Home Affairs
- Website: nema.gov.au

The National Emergency Management Agency (NEMA) is an executive agency of the Australian federal government under the Department of Home Affairs. The agency is responsible for coordinating and managing a national-level emergency response to help those affected by disasters, including bushfires and floods. NEMA was formed on 1 September 2022 from the merger of the two major disaster agencies, the National Recovery and Resilience Agency and Emergency Management Australia.

The formation of the agency was first announced in July 2022 by the newly-appointed Cabinet headed by Anthony Albanese. The agency was originally intended to be named the National Emergency Management, Resilience and Recovery Agency. The name was later simplified to its current name prior to the creation of the agency.

The agency leads Australia’s disaster and emergency management efforts by providing informed strategic oversight and guidance, and by being constantly connected with local communities. It funds programs and initiatives, works with communities, industry and NGOs, gives national leadership, and provides round-the-clock all-hazards monitoring and operational coordination.

The Minister for Emergency Management, currently Kristy McBain, holds ministerial responsibility for the agency. The agency is headed by its Coordinator-General, currently Pat Hetherington.

== Preceding agencies ==
=== National Recovery and Resilience Agency ===
The National Recovery and Resilience Agency (NRRA) was the executive agency to help those affected by disasters, including droughts, bushfires and floods. It was formed on 5 May 2021 from the merger of the National Bushfire Recovery Agency and the National Drought and North Queensland Flood Response and Recovery Agency, in response to the Royal Commission into National Natural Disaster Arrangements.

== See also ==
- List of Australian government entities
