= Royal Commission into National Natural Disaster Arrangements =

Independent public inquiry into National Natural Disaster Arrangements

- Outcome: 80 recommendations in the Final Report
- Commissioners: Mark Binskin (Chair); Annabelle Bennett; Andrew Macintosh
- Inquiry period: 20 February 2020 – 28 October 2020
- Constituting instrument: Royal Commissions Act 1902
- Website: www.royalcommission.gov.au/natural-disasters

The Royal Commission into National Natural Disaster Arrangements, also referred to as the Bushfires Royal Commission, was a royal commission established in 2020 by the Australian government to inquire into and report upon natural disaster management coordination as it related to the 2019–20 Australian bushfire season. The Commission was charged with the responsibility of examining the coordination, preparedness for, response to and recovery from disasters, as well as improving resilience and adapting to changing climatic conditions and mitigating the impact of natural disasters.

The commission was originally scheduled to complete its report by 31 August 2020; however it only handed down interim observations on 31 August 2020 and issued a final report on 28 October 2020. The report, which included between one and seven recommendations for each of 22 chapters relating to different topics, was tabled in Parliament on 30 October 2020.

== Background ==
Between June 2019 and February 2020, various Australian states and territories were subject to large numbers of uncontrolled bushfires, mainly in the southeast of the country. As of 14 January 2020, fires burnt an estimated 18.6 million hectares (46 million acres; 186,000 square kilometres; 72,000 square miles), destroyed over 5,900 buildings (including 2,779 homes) and killed at least 34 people. An estimated one billion animals were killed and some endangered species may be driven to extinction. Air quality dropped to hazardous levels. The cost of dealing with the bushfires is expected to exceed the A$4.4 billion of the 2009 Black Saturday fires, and tourism sector revenues have fallen more than A$1 billion. By 7 January 2020, the smoke had moved approximately 11,000 kilometres (6,800 mi) across the South Pacific Ocean to Chile and Argentina. As of 2 January 2020, NASA estimated that 306 million tonnes (337 million short tons) of CO_{2} (carbon dioxide) was emitted.

From September 2019, fires heavily impacted various regions of the state of New South Wales. In eastern and north-eastern Victoria large areas of forest burnt out of control for four weeks before the fires emerged from the forests in late December. Multiple states of emergency were declared across New South Wales, Victoria, and the Australian Capital Territory. Reinforcements from all over Australia were called in to assist fighting the fires and relieve exhausted local crews in New South Wales. The Australian Defence Force was mobilised to provide air support to the firefighting effort and to provide manpower and logistical support. Firefighters and equipment from New Zealand, Singapore, Canada and the United States, among others, helped fight the fires, especially in New South Wales.

As of 23 January 2020, an air tanker and two helicopters have crashed during firefighting operations, the air tanker crash resulting in the deaths of the three crew. Two fire trucks were caught in fatal incidents caused directly by fire conditions, killing three fire fighters.

There was considerable debate regarding the underlying cause of the intensity and scale of the fires, including the role of fire management practices and climate change, which attracted significant international attention. Politicians visiting fire impacted areas received negative responses, in particular Prime Minister Scott Morrison. An estimated A$500 million was donated by the public at large, international organisations, public figures and celebrities for victim relief and wildlife recovery. Convoys of donated food, clothing and livestock feed were sent to affected areas.

On 5 December 2019 David Littleproud, the minister for natural disasters and emergency management, announced that the House of Representatives Standing Committee on the Environment and Energy would conduct an inquiry into the ‘efficacy of past and current vegetation and land management policy, practice and legislation and their effect on the intensity and frequency of bushfires and subsequent risk to property, life and the environment’. On 14 January 2020, the Victorian Premier, Daniel Andrews, announced an independent investigation into the 2019–2020 bushfire season in Victoria. On 31 January 2020, the NSW Premier, Gladys Berejiklian announced an independent investigation to review the causes, preparation and response to the bushfires in New South Wales.

On 12 January 2020, Prime Minister Scott Morrison outlined a proposal to establish a royal commission into the bushfires. Requiring the approval of the state and territory governments, the Commonwealth Government drafted terms of reference. A number of organisations raised objections to the commission of inquiry, citing cost, length and the emotionally exhausting process; that most previous inquiries had failed to implement many of their recommendations; and that the term of reference failed to address Australia’s emissions reduction policies. Support for the royal commission from Labor premiers was "lukewarm".

== Terms of reference ==
The establishment of the Royal Commission followed a constitutional grey zone by directly initiating defence force deployments, utilising a call out of the Australian Army Reserve, with Australian Defence Force personnel serving in support of state and territory response efforts, without clear rules for engagement.

The Royal Commission into National Natural Disaster Arrangements, also referred to as the Bushfires Royal Commission, was appointed pursuant to the Royal Commissions Act 1902. It was charged with the responsibility of examining the coordination, preparedness for, response to and recovery from disasters, as well as improving resilience and adapting to changing climatic conditions and mitigating the impact of natural disasters. On 20 February 2020, Governor-General David Hurley issued Commonwealth letters patent appointing three commissioners and the commission's terms of reference. The commissioners were directed "to review various operational aspects of the 2019–2020 bushfire season... focused on national coordination conducted jointly between the Commonwealth and State and Territory Governments [so as to] give Australians confidence that natural disaster coordination arrangements are the best they can be."

The terms of reference required the commissioners to examine "Australia's arrangements for improving resilience and adapting to changing climatic conditions, what actions should be taken to mitigate the impacts of natural disasters, and whether accountability for natural disaster risk management ... should be enhanced." The commissioners were directed to consider "thresholds for, and any obstacles to, State or Territory requests for Commonwealth assistance", whether the Commonwealth should have a power to declare a national state of emergency to create "clearer authority to take action ... in the national interest", such as deploying the Australian Defence Force.

Each state was also requested to issue letters patent, or their equivalent instruments of appointment, which allow the three commissioners to conduct an inquiry into natural disaster coordination arrangements under their respective laws. (Despite both the Australian Capital Territory and the Northern Territory having their own governments, they are officially administered under the Commonwealth of Australia, and the Commonwealth letters patent covered their jurisdiction.

== Commissioners and executive ==
On the same day, Morrison announced the setting up of the Royal Commission and the appointment of the following three commissioners:

- Air Chief Marshal Mark Binskin, a former Chief of the Australian Defence Force, the chair of the Royal Commission
- The Honourable Dr Annabelle Bennett, a former judge of Federal Court of Australia and chancellor of Bond University
- Professor Andrew Macintosh, a professor of law at the Australian National University and a member of the university's Climate Change Institute

== Powers ==
The powers of Royal Commissions in Australia are set out in the enabling legislation, the Royal Commissions Act 1902.

Royal Commissions, appointed pursuant to the Royal Commissions Act or otherwise, have powers to issue a summons to a person to appear before the Commission at a hearing to give evidence or to produce documents specified in the summons; require witnesses to take an oath or give an affirmation; and require a person to deliver documents to the Commission at a specified place and time. A person served with a summons or a notice to produce documents must comply with that requirement, or face prosecution for an offence. The penalty for conviction upon such an offence is a fine of A$1,000 or six months imprisonment. A Royal Commission may authorise the Australian Federal Police to execute search warrants.

== Reports ==
The commission was originally scheduled to complete its report by 31 August 2020; however it only handed down interim observations on 31 August 2020 and issued a final report on 28 October 2020. The report was tabled in Parliament on 30 October 2020.

The final report contained 80 recommendations aligned to the chapters of the report. The recommendations aligned the chapters as follows:

Chapter	Recommendations
3 – National coordination arrangements	6
4 – Supporting better decisions	7
5 – Declaration of national emergency	1
6 – National emergency response capability	6
7 – Role of the Australian Defence Force	3
8 – National aerial firefighting capabilities and arrangements	3
9 – Essential Services	5
10 – Community Education	1
11 – Emergency planning	2
12 – Evacuation planning and shelters	7
13 – Emergency information and warnings	6
14 – Air quality	2
15 – Health	4
16 – Wildlife and heritage	1
17 – Public and private land management	3
18 – Indigenous land and fire management	2
19 – Land-use planning and building regulation	4
20 – Insurance	1
21 – Coordinating relief and recovery	5
22 – Delivery of recovery services and financial assistance	8
24 – Assurance and accountability	3

=== Land management ===
In Chapter 17, the Commission found that "The weight of research into the effects of fuel reduction on the propagation of extreme bushfires indicates that as conditions deteriorate, fuel reduction is of diminishing effectiveness". It distinguished between ordinary and extreme bushfires, saying that fuel reduction (whether by various forms of controlled burning or Aboriginal land management practice known as fire-stick farming or "cool burning") could be used to reduce risk: "Reducing available fuels in the landscape can also slow the initial rate of fire spread and fire intensity, which can provide opportunities for fire suppression and thereby reduce the risk of fires escalating into extreme fire events".

== Response and outcomes ==
The Commonwealth Government offered support or in-principle support for the majority of the recommendations although notably did not support the recommendations to establish a national aerial fire-fighting fleet. In November 2020 the Australian Government announced an intention to introduce legislation to give the Commonwealth an ability to declare a national emergency, establish a National Emergency Management Ministers Meeting, strengthen national coordination arrangements within Emergency Management Australia and commence work to establish a National Emergency Resilience, Relief and Recovery Agency. The agency is intended to incorporate the National Bushfire Recovery Agency and the National Drought and North Queensland Flood Response and Recovery Agency.

The Tasmanian Government offered support or in-principle support for all but two of the recommendations. Tasmania did not support aspects of recommendation 5.1, in particular noting that Tasmania "does not support the Australian Government having the power to take action without the agreement of states and territories". Tasmania also did not support recommendation 11.1 that provided for greater State and Territory government responsibility for various emergency planning responsibilities delegated to local government.

== See also ==
- Bushfires in Australia
- List of natural disasters in Australia
- National Bushfire Recovery Agency
