= Emergency Management Australia =

Defunct Australian government organization

Agency overview
- Dissolved: 1 September 2022
- Superseding agency: National Emergency Management Agency
- Jurisdiction: Commonwealth of Australia
- Headquarters: Canberra
- Minister responsible: Murray Watt, Minister for Emergency Management
- Parent department: Department of Home Affairs
- Website: https://www.homeaffairs.gov.au/about-us/our-portfolios/emergency-management/

Emergency Management Australia (EMA) was an Australian Government body responsible for emergency management coordination. EMA was transferred from the Attorney-General's Department in a machinery of government change to become a division of the newly established Department of Home Affairs in 2018. EMA involved the plans, structures and arrangements which are established to bring together the normal endeavours of government, voluntary and private agencies in a comprehensive and coordinated way to deal with the whole spectrum of emergency needs including prevention, preparedness, response and recovery. It was dissolved on the 1 September 2022.

Until late 2001, EMA was an agency within the former Australian Defence Force Support Command and then the Department of Defence Corporate Support Group.

In July 2022, the Albanese government announced that it would recommend the Governor-General to merge the agency and the National Recovery and Resilience Agency on 1 September 2022 to form a new agency. The new agency was later known as the National Emergency Management Agency.

== Role ==
Australian state and territory authorities have a constitutional responsibility, within their boundaries, for coordinating and planning for the response to disasters and civil emergencies. When the total resources (government, community and commercial) of an affected state or territory cannot reasonably cope with the needs of the situation, the state or territory government can seek assistance from the Australian Government.

On request, the Australian Government will provide and coordinate physical assistance to the States in the event of a major natural, technological or civil defence emergency. Such physical assistance will be provided when State and Territory resources are inappropriate, exhausted or unavailable. The Australian Government accepts responsibility and prepares plans for providing Commonwealth physical resources in response to such requests. Emergency Management Australia is nominated as the agency responsible for planning and coordinating Commonwealth physical assistance to the states and territories under the Commonwealth Government Disaster Response Plan (COMDISPLAN).

== Planning ==
The Commonwealth Government Disaster Response Plan (COMDISPLAN) provides the framework for addressing state and territory requests for Commonwealth physical assistance arising from any type of emergency. COMDISPLAN is normally activated when Commonwealth assistance for emergency response or short-term recovery is requested or likely to be requested.

== Structure ==
After the 2009 restructure of the Attorney-General's Department, responsibility for the Australian Emergency Management Institute (formerly the Emergency Management Australia Institute) was taken over by the National Security Capability Development Division.

EMA is made up of the Crisis Management Branch, Disaster Recovery Branch, and the Disaster Preparedness Branch.

== See also ==
- Emergency Management Queensland
- Australasian Fire and Emergency Services Authorities Council
- FEMA, FEMA is not directly EMA's equivalent in the United States of America, however the agencies share some common responsibilities.
- RMIT Centre for Risk & Community Safety
