= Department of Home Affairs (Australia) =

Australian Government interior ministry

Department overview
- Formed: 20 December 2017
- Preceding agencies: Attorney-General's Department – national security and emergency management; Department of Immigration and Border Protection; Department of Infrastructure and Regional Development – transport security; Department of the Prime Minister and Cabinet – counterterrorism and cybersecurity; Department of Social Services – multicultural affairs
- Jurisdiction: Commonwealth of Australia
- Headquarters: Canberra
- Employees: 14,569 (2021)
- Annual budget: $5.942 billion (2021)
- Ministers responsible: Tony Burke, Minister for Home Affairs, Minister for Immigration and Citizenship and Minister for Cyber Security; Anne Aly, Minister for Multicultural Affairs; Kristy McBain, Minister for Emergency Management
- Department executive: Stephanie Foster, Secretary
- Child agencies: Australian Border Force; Australian Criminal Intelligence Commission; Australian Federal Police; Australian Institute of Criminology; Australian Security Intelligence Organisation; Australian Transaction Reports and Analysis Centre; National Emergency Management Agency
- Website: www.homeaffairs.gov.au

The Department of Home Affairs is a department of state of the Australian federal government responsible for national security, protective services, emergency management, border control, immigration, refugees, citizenship, transport security and multicultural affairs. The department reports to the federal minister for Home Affairs, currently held by Tony Burke, and is led by the secretary of the Department of Home Affairs, Stephanie Foster.

The department was officially established on 20 December 2017, building on the former Department of Immigration and Border Protection and bringing policy responsibilities and agencies from the Attorney-General's Department, Department of Infrastructure and Regional Development, Department of the Prime Minister and Cabinet, and Department of Social Services. The Department of Home Affairs was seen at the time as the Australian version of the United Kingdom's Home Office or the United States Department of Homeland Security.

In 2022, the Australian Federal Police, Australian Criminal Intelligence Commission and Australian Transaction Reports and Analysis Centre were de-merged from the department and moved to the Attorney-General's Department, and in July 2024 the Australian Security Intelligence Organisation was also moved to the Attorney-General's Department.

== History ==
One of the seven inaugural Australian Public Service departments at the federation of Australia was the Department of Home Affairs (1901–16) with wide-ranging responsibilities for public works, elections, census, the public service, pensions, and inter-state relations. This department was followed by the Department of Home and Territories (1916–1928), the Department of Home Affairs (1928–32), the Department of the Interior (1932–39), the Department of the Interior (1939–72), the Department of Home Affairs (1977–80), and the Department of Home Affairs and Environment (1980–84). Prior to the formation of the current Department of Home Affairs, the Attorney-General's Department had responsibility for national security, law enforcement, emergency management as well as border protection alongside the various forms of the Department of Immigration and Citizenship.

The proposed establishment of the Department of Home Affairs was announced by Prime Minister Malcolm Turnbull on 18 July 2017 to be headed by Immigration Minister Peter Dutton as the designated Minister for Home Affairs to bring together all national security, border control and law enforcement agencies of the government. The department was officially stood up on the 20 December 2017 through an Administrative Arrangements Order.

== Ministers ==
The following are the ministers of the Home Affairs portfolio:

- Minister for Home Affairs, Minister for Immigration and Citizenship and Minister for Cyber Security: Tony Burke
- Minister for Multicultural Affairs: Anne Aly
- Minister for Emergency Management: Kristy McBain

== Portfolio responsibilities ==
The department is responsible for the following functions, according to an Administrative Arrangements Order made on 13 May 2025:

- Immigration and migration, including
  - border security
  - entry, stay and departure arrangements for non-citizens
  - customs and border control other than quarantine and inspection
- Citizenship
- Ethnic affairs
- Law enforcement policy and operations
- National security policy and operations
- Multicultural affairs
- Protective security policy
- Protective services at Commonwealth establishments and diplomatic and consular premises in Australia
- Social cohesion
- Transport security
- Cyber security policy and co-ordination
- Cybercrime
- Critical infrastructure protection and co-ordination
- Commonwealth emergency management
- Arrangements for the settlement of migrants and humanitarian entrants
- Adult migrant education
- All hazards relief, recovery and mitigation policy and financial assistance including payments to the States and Territories and the Australian Government Disaster Recovery Payment

== Departmental functions ==
=== Counter-Terrorism ===
The Commonwealth Counter-Terrorism Coordinator and the Centre for Counter-Terrorism Coordination within the Department of Home Affairs (formerly within the Department of the Prime Minister and Cabinet) provides strategic advice and support to the Minister for Home Affairs and the Prime Minister on all aspects of counterterrorism and countering violent extremism policy and co-ordination across government. The Office was created after recommendations from the Review of Australia's Counter-Terrorism Machinery in 2015 in response to the 2014 Sydney hostage crisis. The Commonwealth Counter-Terrorism Coordinator also serves as the Co-Chair and or Chair of the Australian and New Zealand Counter-Terrorism Committee and the Joint Counter-Terrorism Board, with the Centre for Counter-Terrorism Coordination providing secretariat support to the Australian Counter-Terrorism Centre and the Australian and New Zealand Counter-Terrorism Committee. Along with the Deputy Counter-Terrorism Coordinator, the Centre for Counter-Terrorism Coordination is also composed of the Counter-Terrorism Operational Coordination and Evaluation Branch, the Counter-Terrorism Strategic Coordination Branch, the Counter-Terrorism Capability Branch, and the Home Affairs Counter-Terrorism Policy Branch.

=== Cyber Security ===
The inaugural National Cyber Security Coordinator was Air Marshal Darren Goldie from 3 July 2023 to 14 November 2023, Hamish Hansford (Deputy Secretary of Cyber and Infrastructure Security) acted in the position after Goldie was recalled to Defence. Lieutenant General Michelle McGuinness was appointed to the role from 26 February 2024. The National Cyber Security Coordinator and the Cyber Security Policy Division within the Department of Home Affairs (formerly within the Department of the Prime Minister and Cabinet) are responsible for cyber security policy and the implementation of the Australian Government Cyber Security Strategy. The National Cyber Coordinator also ensures effective partnerships between Commonwealth, state and territory governments, the private sector, non-governmental organisations, the research community and international partners. The National Cyber Coordinator also works closely with the Australian Cyber Security Centre and the Australian Ambassador for Cyber Issues.

CERT Australia is the national computer emergency response team responsible for cybersecurity responses and providing cyber security advice and support to critical infrastructure and other systems of national interest. CERT Australia works closely with other Australian Government agencies, international CERTs, and the private sector. It is also a key element in the Australian Cyber Security Centre, sharing information and working closely with ASIO, the Australian Federal Police, the Australian Signals Directorate, the Defence Intelligence Organisation and the Australian Criminal Intelligence Commission.

=== Aviation and Maritime Security ===
The Aviation and Maritime Security Division (formerly the Office of Transport Security within the Department of Infrastructure and Regional Development) is led by the Executive Director of Transport Security and is responsible for aviation security, air cargo security, maritime security, and various transport security operations.

=== Transnational Serious and Organised Crime ===
The Commonwealth Transnational Serious and Organised Crime Coordinator is responsible for policy development and strategic coordination of the disruption of transnational serious organised crime across the Australian Government including the Australian Federal Police, Australian Border Force, Australian Criminal Intelligence Commission, Australian Transaction Reports and Analysis Centre, and state and territory law enforcement agencies. The Coordinator is held concurrently by an Australian Federal Police Deputy Commissioner.

=== Counter Child Exploitation ===
The Australian Centre to Counter Child Exploitation is a whole-of-government initiative within the Australian Federal Police responsible to the Commonwealth Transnational Serious and Organised Crime Coordinator to investigate, disrupt and prosecute child exploitation and online child abuse crimes.

=== Counter Foreign Interference ===
The National Counter Foreign Interference Coordinator is responsible for policy development and strategic coordination of countering foreign interference and counter-espionage to protect the integrity of Australian national security and interests. The Coordinator is responsible for interagency and intergovernmental strategy and coordination to counter coercive, clandestine or deceptive activities undertaken on behalf of foreign powers. Accordingly, the Coordinator acts as an intergovernmental focal point for the Australian Federal Police, the Australian Security Intelligence Organisation, the Department of Foreign Affairs and Trade, the Attorney-General's Department, and elements of the Department of Defence such as the Defence Security and Vetting Service and Australian Defence Force Investigative Service.

=== Critical Infrastructure ===
The Australian Government Critical Infrastructure Centre (CIC) is responsible for whole-of-government coordination of critical infrastructure protection and national security risk assessments and advice. It was established on 23 January 2017 originally within the Attorney-General's Department and brings together expertise and capability from across the Australian Government and functions in close consultation states and territory governments, regulators, and the private sector. The Centre also supports the Foreign Investment Review Board and brings together staff from across governmental authorities including from the Australian Treasury, the Department of Infrastructure and Regional Development, and the Department of the Environment and Energy.

=== Crisis Coordination ===
The Australian Government Crisis Coordination Centre (CCC) is an all-hazards coordination facility, which operates on a 24/7 basis, and supports the Australian Government Crisis Committee (AGCC) and the National Crisis Committee (NCC). The CCC provides whole-of-government all-hazards monitoring and situational awareness for domestic and international events and coordinates Australian Government responses to major domestic incidents. The Crisis Coordination Centre is managed by the Crisis Management Branch of Emergency Management Australia which was within the Attorney-General's Department before its transfer.

== See also ==
- Department of Home Affairs (1901–16)
- Department of Home and Territories (1916–1928)
- Department of Home Affairs (1928–32)
- Department of the Interior (1932–39)
- Department of the Interior (1939–72)
- Department of Home Affairs (1977–80)
- Department of Home Affairs and Environment (1980–84)
