= Minister for the Environment and Water =

Australian cabinet position

- Commonwealth Coat of Arms

- Flag of Australia

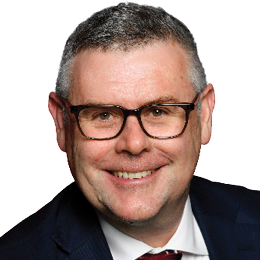
- Incumbent; Murray Watt since 13 May 2025
- Department of Climate Change, Energy, the Environment and Water
- Style: The Honourable
- Appointer: Governor-General on the advice of the prime minister
- Inaugural holder: Peter Howson (as Minister for the Environment, Aborigines and the Arts)
- Formation: 10 March 1971
- Website: minister.dcceew.gov.au/watt

The Australian minister for the environment and water is a position which is currently held by Murray Watt in the Albanese ministry since 13 May 2025, following the Australian federal election in 2025.

In the Government of Australia, the minister and assistant minister are responsible for the protection and conservation of the environment; to ensure that Australia benefits from meteorological and related sciences and services; and to see that Australia's interests in Antarctica are advanced. The minister provides direction and oversight of the Department of Agriculture, Water and the Environment (previously the Department of the Environment and Energy, and before that the Department of Sustainability, Environment, Water, Population and Communities) to develop and implement national policy, programs and legislation to protect and conserve Australia's environment and heritage.

== Portfolio responsibilities ==
The minister administers their portfolio through the Department of Climate Change, Energy, the Environment and Water and its environment component bodies, including:

- Antarctic Animal Ethics Committee
- Antarctic Ethics Committee (Human Experimentation)
- Antarctic Research Assessment Committees (ARACs)
- Antarctic Science Advisory Committee
- Australia-Netherlands Committee on Old Dutch Shipwrecks
- Australian Antarctic Names and Medals Committee
- Australian Heritage Council
- Bureau of Meteorology
- Environment Protection and Heritage Council
- Great Barrier Reef Consultative Committee
- Great Barrier Reef Marine Park Authority
- Great Barrier Reef Ministerial Council
- Great Barrier Reef Structural Adjustment Package Technical Advisory Committee
- Hazardous Waste Technical Group
- Murray-Darling Basin Authority
- National Environment Protection Council
- National Environmental Education Council
- New South Wales World Heritage Properties Ministerial Council
- Office of the Renewable Energy Regulator
- Science Program Management Committee
- State of the Environment Committee 2006
- Stockholm Intergovernmental Forum
- Sydney Harbour Federation Trust
- Tasmanian Wilderness World Heritage Area Ministerial Council
- Threatened Species Scientific Committee
- Wet Tropics Ministerial Council

== List of ministers ==
=== Environment ===
The following individuals have been appointed as Minister for the Environment, or any precedent titles:

Order	Minister	Party affiliation	Prime Minister	Ministerial title	Term start	Term end	Term in office
1	Peter Howson	Liberal	McMahon	Minister for the Environment, Aborigines and the Arts	10 March 1971	5 December 1972	1 year, 270 days
2	Gough Whitlam^{1}	Labor	Whitlam	Minister for the Environment, Aborigines and the Arts	5 December 1972	19 December 1972	14 days
3	Moss Cass	Labor	Whitlam	Minister for the Environment and Conservation	19 December 1972	21 April 1975	2 years, 169 days
3	Moss Cass	Labor	Whitlam	Minister for the Environment	21 April 1975	6 June 1975	2 years, 169 days
4	Jim Cairns	Labor	Whitlam	Minister for the Environment	6 June 1975	2 July 1975	26 days
(2)	Gough Whitlam	Labor	Whitlam	Minister for the Environment	2 July 1975	14 July 1975	12 days
5	Joe Berinson	Labor	Whitlam	Minister for the Environment	14 July 1975	11 November 1975	120 days
6	Andrew Peacock	Liberal	Fraser	Minister for the Environment	11 November 1975	22 December 1975	41 days
7	Ivor Greenwood	Liberal	Fraser	Minister for Environment, Housing and Community Development	22 December 1975	8 July 1976	199 days
8	Kevin Newman	Liberal	Fraser	Minister for Environment, Housing and Community Development	8 July 1976	20 December 1977	1 year, 165 days
9	Ray Groom	Liberal	Fraser	Minister for Environment, Housing and Community Development	20 December 1977	5 December 1978	350 days
10	James Webster	Liberal	Fraser	Minister for Science and the Environment	5 December 1978	8 December 1979	1 year, 3 days
11	David Thomson	Liberal	Fraser	Minister for Science and the Environment	8 December 1979	3 November 1980	331 days
12	Robert Ellicott	Liberal	Fraser	Minister for Home Affairs and the Environment	3 November 1980	17 February 1981	106 days
13	Michael MacKellar	Liberal	Fraser	Minister for Home Affairs and the Environment	17 February 1981	19 March 1981	30 days
14	Ian Wilson	Liberal	Fraser	Minister for Home Affairs and the Environment	19 March 1981	7 May 1982	1 year, 49 days
15	Tom McVeigh	National Country	Fraser	Minister for Home Affairs and the Environment	7 May 1982	16 October 1982	308 days
15	Tom McVeigh	National	Fraser	Minister for Home Affairs and the Environment	16 October 1982	11 March 1983	308 days
16	Barry Cohen	Labor	Hawke	Minister for Home Affairs and the Environment	11 March 1983	13 December 1984	4 years, 135 days
16	Barry Cohen	Labor	Hawke	Minister for Arts, Heritage and the Environment	13 December 1984	24 July 1987	4 years, 135 days
17	John Brown	Labor	Hawke	Minister for Arts, Sport, the Environment, Tourism and Territories	24 July 1987	18 December 1987	147 days
18	Graham Richardson	Labor	Hawke	Minister for Arts, Sport, the Environment, Tourism and Territories	19 January 1988	4 April 1990	2 years, 75 days
19	Ros Kelly	Labor	Hawke	Minister for Arts, Sport, the Environment, Tourism and Territories	4 April 1990	20 December 1991	3 years, 331 days
19	Ros Kelly	Labor	Keating	Minister for Arts, Sport, the Environment and Territories	20 December 1991	24 March 1993	3 years, 331 days
19	Ros Kelly	Labor	Keating	Minister for the Environment, Sport and Territories	24 March 1993	1 March 1994	3 years, 331 days
(18)	Graham Richardson	Labor	Keating	Minister for the Environment, Sport and Territories	1 March 1994	25 March 1994	24 days
20	John Faulkner	Labor	Keating	Minister for the Environment, Sport and Territories	25 March 1994	11 March 1996	1 year, 352 days
21	Robert Hill	Liberal	Howard	Minister for the Environment	11 March 1996	21 October 1998	5 years, 260 days
22	Robert Hill	Liberal	Howard	Minister for the Environment and Heritage	21 October 1998	26 November 2001	5 years, 260 days
23	David Kemp	Liberal	Howard	Minister for the Environment and Heritage	26 November 2001	26 October 2004	2 years, 335 days
24	Ian Campbell	Liberal	Howard	Minister for the Environment and Heritage	26 October 2004	30 January 2007	2 years, 96 days
25	Malcolm Turnbull	Liberal	Howard	Minister for the Environment and Water Resources	30 January 2007	3 December 2007	307 days
26	Peter Garrett	Labor	Rudd	Minister for the Environment, Heritage and the Arts	3 December 2007	8 March 2010	2 years, 285 days
26	Peter Garrett	Labor	Rudd	Minister for Environment Protection, Heritage and the Arts	8 March 2010	24 June 2010	2 years, 285 days
26	Peter Garrett	Labor	Gillard	Minister for Environment Protection, Heritage and the Arts	24 June 2010	14 September 2010	2 years, 285 days
27	Tony Burke	Labor	Gillard	Minister for Sustainability, Environment, Water, Population and Communities	14 September 2010	1 July 2013	2 years, 290 days
28	Mark Butler	Labor	Rudd	Minister for the Environment, Heritage and Water	1 July 2013	18 September 2013	79 days
29	Greg Hunt	Liberal	Abbott	Minister for the Environment	18 September 2013	15 September 2015	2 years, 305 days
29	Greg Hunt	Liberal	Turnbull	Minister for the Environment	15 September 2015	19 July 2016	2 years, 305 days
30	Josh Frydenberg	Liberal	Turnbull	Minister for the Environment and Energy	19 July 2016	28 August 2018	2 years, 40 days
31	Melissa Price	Liberal	Morrison	Minister for the Environment	28 August 2018	29 May 2019	274 days
32	Sussan Ley	Liberal	Morrison	Minister for the Environment	29 May 2019	23 May 2022	2 years, 359 days
33	Tanya Plibersek	Labor	Albanese	Minister for the Environment and Water	1 June 2022	13 May 2025	2 years, 346 days
34	Murray Watt	Labor	Albanese	Minister for the Environment and Water	13 May 2025	Incumbent	1 year, 117 days

Notes

^{1} Whitlam was one of a two-man ministry consisting of himself and Lance Barnard for two weeks until the full ministry was announced.

=== Water ===
The following individuals have been appointed as Minister for Water, or any precedent titles:

Order	Minister	Party affiliation	Prime Minister	Ministerial title	Term start	Term end	Term in office
1	Malcolm Turnbull	Liberal	Howard	Minister for the Environment and Water Resources	30 January 2007	3 December 2007	307 days
2	Penny Wong	Labor	Rudd	Minister for Climate Change and Water	3 December 2007	8 March 2010	2 years, 285 days
2	Penny Wong	Labor	Rudd	Minister for Climate Change, Energy Efficiency and Water	8 March 2010	24 June 2010	2 years, 285 days
2	Penny Wong	Labor	Gillard	Minister for Climate Change, Energy Efficiency and Water	24 June 2010	14 September 2010	2 years, 285 days
3	Tony Burke	Labor	Gillard	Minister for Sustainability, Environment, Water, Population and Communities	14 September 2010	1 July 2013	2 years, 290 days
4	Mark Butler	Labor	Rudd	Minister for the Environment, Heritage and Water	1 July 2013	18 September 2013	79 days
5	Barnaby Joyce	National	Turnbull	Minister for Agriculture and Water Resources	21 September 2015	27 October 2017	2 years, 36 days
(1)	Malcolm Turnbull	Liberal	Turnbull	Minister for Agriculture and Water Resources	27 October 2017	6 December 2017	40 days
(5)	Barnaby Joyce	National	Turnbull	Minister for Agriculture and Water Resources	6 December 2017	20 December 2017	14 days
6	David Littleproud	National	Turnbull	Minister for Agriculture and Water Resources	20 December 2017	28 August 2018	2 years, 48 days
6	David Littleproud	National	Morrison	Minister for Agriculture and Water Resources	28 August 2018	29 May 2019	2 years, 48 days
6	David Littleproud	National	Morrison	Minister for Water Resources, Drought, Rural Finance, Natural Disaster and Emergency Management	29 May 2019	6 February 2020	2 years, 48 days
7	Keith Pitt	National	Morrison	Minister for Resources, Water and Northern Australia	6 February 2020	2 July 2021	2 years, 106 days
7	Keith Pitt	National	Morrison	Minister for Resources and Water	2 July 2021	23 May 2022	2 years, 106 days
8	Tanya Plibersek	Labor	Albanese	Minister for the Environment and Water	1 June 2022	13 May 2025	2 years, 346 days
9	Murray Watt	Labor	Albanese	Minister for the Environment and Water	13 May 2025	Incumbent	1 year, 117 days

== Former ministerial portfolios ==
=== List of ministers for population ===
The following individuals have served as the minister for cities, or any other precedent titles:

Order	Minister	Party	Prime Minister	Title	Term start	Term end	Term in office
1	Tom Uren	Labor	Whitlam	Minister for Urban and Regional Development	19 December 1972	11 November 1975	2 years, 327 days
2	John Carrick	Liberal	Fraser	Minister for Urban and Regional Development	11 November 1975	22 December 1975	41 days
3	Ivor Greenwood	Liberal	Fraser	Minister for Environment, Housing and Community Development	22 December 1975	8 July 1976	199 days
4	Kevin Newman	Liberal	Fraser	Minister for Environment, Housing and Community Development	8 July 1976	20 December 1977	1 year, 165 days
5	Ray Groom	Liberal	Fraser	Minister for Environment, Housing and Community Development	20 December 1977	5 December 1978	350 days
6	Tony Burke	Labor	Rudd	Minister for Population	14 April 2010	28 June 2010	3 years, 78 days
6	Tony Burke	Labor	Gillard	Minister for Sustainable Population	28 June 2010	14 September 2010	3 years, 78 days
6	Tony Burke	Labor	Gillard	Minister for Sustainability, Environment, Water, Population and Communities	14 September 2010	1 July 2013	3 years, 78 days
7	Jamie Briggs	Liberal	Abbott	Assistant Minister for Infrastructure and Regional Development	18 September 2013	15 September 2015	2 years, 102 days
7	Jamie Briggs	Liberal	Turnbull	Assistant Minister for Infrastructure and Regional Development	15 September 2015	21 September 2015	2 years, 102 days
7	Jamie Briggs	Liberal	Turnbull	Minister for Cities and the Built Environment	21 September 2015	29 December 2015	2 years, 102 days
8	Paul Fletcher	Liberal	Turnbull	Minister for Urban Infrastructure	19 July 2016	20 December 2017	2 years, 39 days
8	Paul Fletcher	Liberal	Turnbull	Minister for Urban Infrastructure and Cities	20 December 2017	28 August 2018	2 years, 39 days
9	Alan Tudge	Liberal	Morrison	Minister for Cities, Urban Infrastructure and Population	28 August 2018	29 May 2019	2 years, 116 days
9	Alan Tudge	Liberal	Morrison	Minister for Population, Cities and Urban Infrastructure	29 May 2019	22 December 2020	2 years, 116 days
(8)	Paul Fletcher	Liberal	Morrison	Minister for Communications, Urban Infrastructure, Cities and the Arts	22 December 2020	23 May 2022	1 year, 152 days
10	Jenny McAllister	Labor	Albanese	Minister for Cities	29 July 2024	13 May 2025	288 days
11	Clare O'Neil	Labor	Albanese	Minister for Cities	13 May 2025	Incumbent	1 year, 117 days

=== List of ministers for conservation ===
The following individuals have been appointed as junior ministers in the agriculture portfolio or any of its precedent titles.

Order	Minister	Party	Prime Minister	Title	Term start	Term end	Term in office
1	Wilson Tuckey	Liberal	Howard	Minister for Forestry and Conservation	21 October 1998	26 November 2001	3 years, 36 days
2	Ian Macdonald	Liberal	Howard	Minister for Forestry and Conservation	26 November 2001	14 November 2002	4 years, 62 days
2	Ian Macdonald	Liberal	Howard	Minister for Fisheries, Forestry and Conservation	14 November 2002	27 January 2006	4 years, 62 days
3	Eric Abetz	Liberal	Howard	Minister for Fisheries, Forestry and Conservation	27 January 2006	3 December 2007	1 year, 310 days
4	Tony Burke	Labor	Rudd	Minister for Agriculture, Fisheries and Forestry	3 December 2007	28 June 2010	2 years, 285 days
4	Tony Burke	Labor	Gillard	Minister for Agriculture, Fisheries and Forestry	28 June 2010	14 September 2010	2 years, 285 days
5	Joe Ludwig	Labor	Gillard	Minister for Agriculture, Fisheries and Forestry	14 September 2010	1 July 2013	2 years, 290 days
6	Joel Fitzgibbon	Labor	Rudd	Minister for Agriculture, Fisheries and Forestry	1 July 2013	18 September 2013	79 days
7	Murray Watt	Labor	Albanese	Minister for Agriculture, Fisheries and Forestry	1 June 2022	29 July 2024	2 years, 58 days
8	Julie Collins	Labor	Albanese	Minister for Agriculture, Fisheries and Forestry	29 July 2024	incumbent	2 years, 40 days

== Assistant ministers ==
=== List of assistant ministers for the environment ===
The following individual has served as the Assistant Minister for the Environment.

Order	Minister	Party	Prime Minister	Title	Term start	Term end	Term in office
1	Sharman Stone	Liberal	Howard	Parliamentary Secretary to the Minister for the Environment and Heritage	21 October 1998	26 October 2004	6 years, 5 days
2	Greg Hunt	Liberal	Howard	Parliamentary Secretary to the Minister for the Environment and Heritage	26 October 2004	30 January 2007	2 years, 96 days
3	John Cobb	National	Howard	Assistant Minister for the Environment and Heritage	30 January 2007	3 December 2007	307 days
4	Amanda Rishworth	Labor	Rudd	Parliamentary Secretary for Environment and Urban Water	1 July 2013	18 September 2013	79 days
5	Simon Birmingham	Liberal	Abbott	Parliamentary Secretary to the Minister for the Environment	18 September 2013	23 December 2014	1 year, 96 days
6	Bob Baldwin	Liberal	Abbott	Parliamentary Secretary to the Minister for the Environment	23 December 2014	21 September 2015	272 days
7	Melissa Price	Liberal	Turnbull	Assistant Minister for the Environment	20 December 2017	28 August 2018	251 days

=== List of assistant ministers for water ===
The following individual has served as the Assistant Minister for Water.

Order	Minister	Party	Prime Minister	Title	Term start	Term end	Term in office
1	Anne Ruston	Liberal	Turnbull	Assistant Minister for Agriculture and Water Resources	21 September 2015	28 August 2018	2 years, 341 days

== See also ==
- Ministers for Environment
  - Minister for the Environment (New South Wales)
  - Minister for the Environment (Victoria)
  - Minister for Environment (Western Australia)
  - Minister for the Environment, Climate Change and Water Security (Northern Territory)
- Ministers for Water
  - Minister for Water (New South Wales)
  - Minister for Water (Victoria)
  - Minister for Water (Western Australia)
