= Murray Watt =

Australian politician

Senator the Honourable Murray Watt
- Watt in 2026

Minister for the Environment and Water
- Incumbent
- Assumed office 13 May 2025
- Prime Minister: Anthony Albanese
- Preceded by: Tanya Plibersek

Minister for Employment and Workplace Relations
- In office 29 July 2024 – 13 May 2025
- Prime Minister: Anthony Albanese
- Preceded by: Tony Burke
- Succeeded by: Amanda Rishworth

Minister for Agriculture, Fisheries and Forestry
- In office 1 June 2022 – 29 July 2024
- Prime Minister: Anthony Albanese
- Preceded by: David Littleproud
- Succeeded by: Julie Collins

Minister for Emergency Management
- In office 1 June 2022 – 29 July 2024
- Prime Minister: Anthony Albanese
- Preceded by: Bridget McKenzie
- Succeeded by: Jenny McAllister

Senator for Queensland
- Incumbent
- Assumed office 2 July 2016
- Preceded by: Jan McLucas

Member of the Queensland Legislative Assembly for Everton
- In office 21 March 2009 – 24 March 2012
- Preceded by: Rod Welford
- Succeeded by: Tim Mander

Personal details
- Born: Murray Patrick Watt; 20 January 1973 (age 53) Brisbane, Queensland, Australia
- Party: Australian Labor Party
- Children: 2
- Education: University of Queensland
- Occupation: Public servant Judge's associate Political advisor
- Profession: Lawyer
- Website: www.murraywatt.com

Murray Patrick Watt (born 20 January 1973) is an Australian politician who has served as Minister for the Environment and Water in the Albanese government since May 2025. He is a member of the Australian Labor Party (ALP) and has been a Senator for Queensland since the 2016 federal election. He previously served in the Queensland Legislative Assembly from 2009 to 2012..

== Early life and education ==
Watt was born in Brisbane on 20 January 1973. His parents were both schoolteachers; his mother was a deputy principal. He grew up in Brisbane's southern suburbs.

Watt was educated at Brisbane State High School where he was school captain in 1989. Watt studied law and commerce at University of Queensland, where he was student union president. He graduated in 1996 with the degrees of Bachelor of Commerce and Bachelor of Laws.

== Career ==
Watt practised as a solicitor from 1997 to 2002. He articled at Blake Dawson Waldron. He was also a judge's associate, from 1999 to 2000. He was then a public servant in the Queensland Department of Premier and Cabinet and the Department of State Development from 2007 to 2009. He served as chief of staff to Anna Bligh from 2002 to 2007, and again in 2008. He had long been active in the Australian Labor Party, as president of Queensland Young Labor in 1998 and delegate to various state conferences.

Watt was also a senior associate with the Brisbane office of the legal firm Maurice Blackburn.

=== State politics ===
In 2009, Watt was elected to the Legislative Assembly of Queensland for Everton, succeeding Rod Welford, who had retired. He was defeated at the 2012 state election.

When Meaghan Scanlon was preselected as the Labor candidate for Gaven at the 2017 state election, it was claimed that Watt was the deciding factor and that it was against the wishes of the branch members. One member of the branch claimed "factional politics prior to Murray coming to the Gold Coast didn't happen".

=== Federal politics ===
Following the retirement of Senator Jan McLucas in 2015, Watt was endorsed by the Labor Party as a Senate candidate for Queensland at the 2016 federal election and was subsequently elected.

After the 2019 election Watt was included in Anthony Albanese's shadow ministry as Shadow Minister for Northern Australia and Shadow Minister for Disaster and Emergency Management. In 2021, he was also appointed to the role of Shadow Minister for Queensland Resources. He was also Deputy Opposition Whip in the Senate.

Watt is a member of Labor Left.

Re-elected at the 2022 election, Watt became Minister for Agriculture, Fisheries and Forestry and Minister for Emergency Management. In the July 2024 reshuffle, he was appointed Minister for Employment and Workplace Relations.

After the re-election of the Albanese government in the 2025 federal election, Watt was moved to the role of Minister for the Environment and Water in the second Albanese ministry.

In 2026, it was revealed that Australian ISIS Doctor Tareq Kamleh wanted to come back to Australia. Watt refused him assistance.

== Personal life ==
Watt met his wife, Cynthia, while they were both students at the University of Queensland. The couple have two children.

Parliament of Queensland
| Preceded by Rod Welford | Member for Everton; 2009–2012 | Succeeded by Tim Mander |
Parliament of Australia
| Preceded by Jan McLucas | Senator for Queensland; 2016–present | Incumbent |
Political offices
| Preceded by David Littleproud | Minister for Agriculture, Fisheries and Forestry; 2022–2024 | Succeeded by Julie Collins |
| Preceded by Bridget McKenzie | Minister for Emergency Management; 2022–2024 | Succeeded by Jenny McAllister |
| Preceded by Tony Burke | Minister for Employment and Workplace Relations; 2024–2025 | Succeeded by Amanda Rishworth |
| Preceded by Tanya Plibersek | Minister for the Environment and Water; 2025–present | Incumbent |
