= Julie Collins =

Australian politician (born 1971)

The Honourable Julie Collins MP
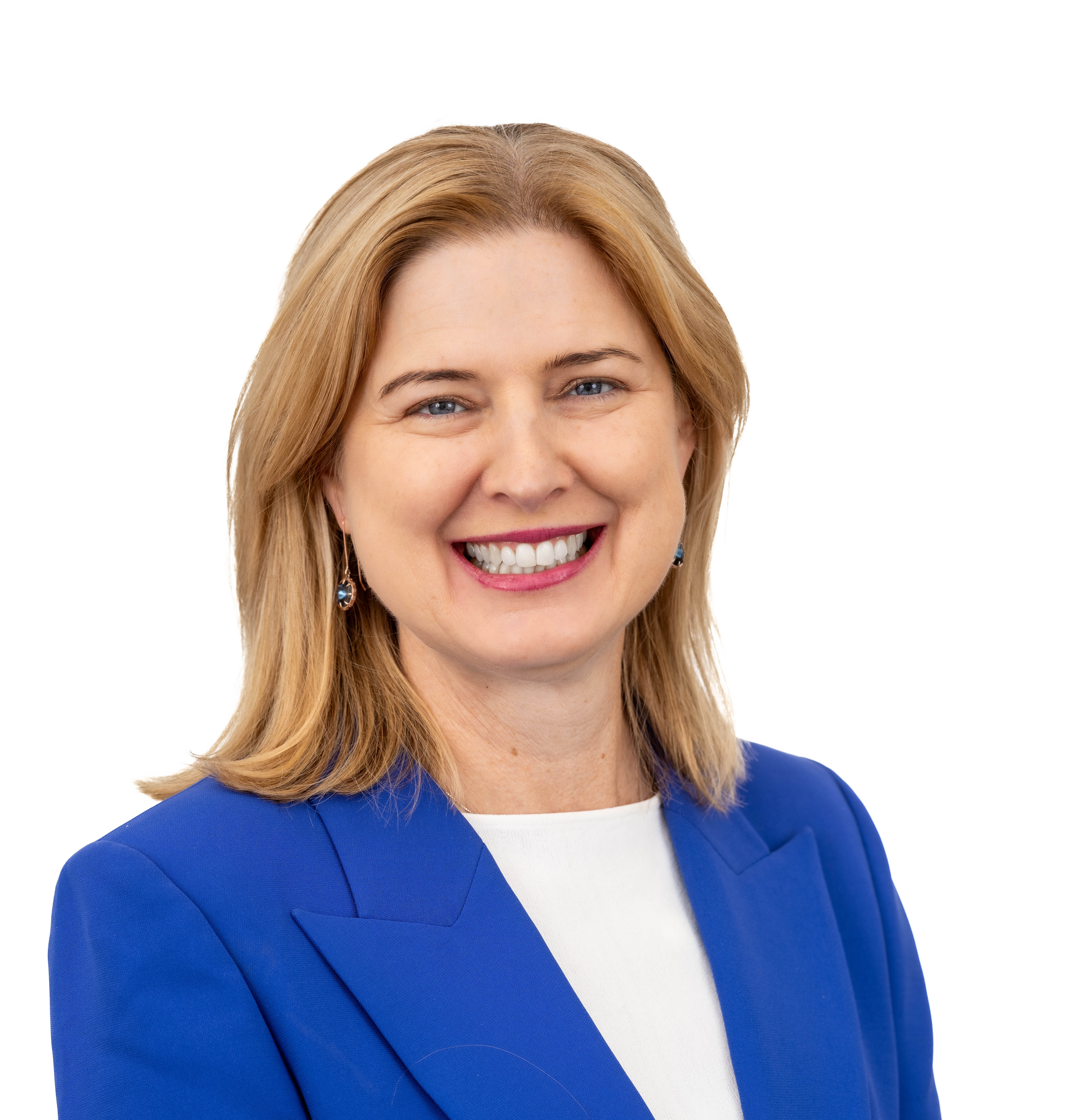
- Official portrait, 2025

Minister for Agriculture, Fisheries and Forestry
- Incumbent
- Assumed office 29 July 2024
- Prime Minister: Anthony Albanese
- Preceded by: Murray Watt

Minister for Small Business
- In office 1 June 2022 – 13 May 2025
- Prime Minister: Anthony Albanese
- Preceded by: Stuart Robert
- Succeeded by: Anne Aly

Minister for Housing and Homelessness
- In office 1 June 2022 – 29 July 2024
- Prime Minister: Anthony Albanese
- Preceded by: Michael Sukkar
- Succeeded by: Clare O'Neil
- In office 1 July 2013 – 18 September 2013
- Prime Minister: Kevin Rudd
- Preceded by: Mark Butler
- Succeeded by: Position abolished

Minister for Community Services
- In office 14 December 2011 – 18 September 2013
- Prime Minister: Julia Gillard; Kevin Rudd
- Preceded by: Position created
- Succeeded by: Position abolished

Minister for the Status of Women
- In office 14 December 2011 – 18 September 2013
- Prime Minister: Julia Gillard; Kevin Rudd
- Preceded by: Kate Ellis
- Succeeded by: Tony Abbott

Member of the Australian Parliament for Franklin
- Incumbent
- Assumed office 24 November 2007
- Preceded by: Harry Quick

Personal details
- Born: Julie Maree Collins; 3 July 1971 (age 55) Hobart, Tasmania, Australia
- Party: Labor
- Occupation: Politician
- Website: www.juliecollins.com

Julie Maree Collins (born 3 July 1971) is an Australian politician who serves as Minister for Agriculture, Fisheries and Forestry in the Albanese ministry. She is a member of the Australian Labor Party (ALP) and has represented the Tasmanian seat of Franklin since the 2007 federal election. She previously held ministerial positions in the Gillard and Rudd governments and in the first Albanese ministry.

== Early life ==
Collins was born in Hobart on 3 July 1971. Her father died when she was five months old, leaving her mother, Anne Peters, widowed at the age of 19. She spent her early years in her grandparents' housing commission property. Her mother subsequently remarried and she was adopted by her step-father Andrew Collins.

Collins attended Cosgrove High School but discontinued her studies at 15 before finishing high school and began a full time role at the local supermarket she worked at since she was 14. She did this as she became aware that she could not financially afford the costs of finishing years 11 and 12. Shortly after the 1987 federal election she began working for the ALP as an administrative assistant. She holds a certificate IV in business administration.

Collins was one of just 4 members of the 46th Parliament of Australia who did not graduate from high school, the others being Jacqui Lambie, Llew O'Brien and Terry Young.

== Politics ==
Prior to entering parliament herself, Collins worked in various administrative positions for Tasmanian Labor MPs and state government departments. She worked for the state health department (1990–1993), state opposition leader Michael Field (1993–1994), Senator John Coates (1995–1996), Senator Sue Mackay (1996–1998), Hydro Tasmania (1998), state premier Jim Bacon (1998–2003), the state Department of Tourism, Parks, Heritage and the Arts (2003–2005), and Senator Carol Brown (2005–2006).

Collins was state president of Young Labor in 1996 and a delegate to state and national conference. She served as state secretary of the ALP from 2006 to 2007.

Collins is a member of Labor Left.

=== Rudd and Gillard governments (2007–2013) ===
Collins was elected to the House of Representatives at the 2007 federal election retaining the Division of Franklin for the ALP following the retirement of Harry Quick and becoming the first woman to represent the electorate. Quick had been expelled from the ALP months prior after failing to pay his membership fees, and appearing with Liberal party representatives Vanessa Goodwin the candidate for Franklin and minister Joe Hockey when the preselected ALP candidate for Franklin was Tasmanian union official Kevin Harkins who Quick opposed. Harkins resigned as candidate after more controversy and Collins was preselected as the candidate by the ALP's national executive. Collins had previously unsuccessfully stood for the seat of Denison in the 2006 state election.

She successfully held her seat in the 2010 federal election and was sworn in as Parliamentary Secretary for Community Services on 14 September 2010 in the Second Gillard ministry. In 2011, Collins became Minister for Community Services, Minister for Indigenous Employment and Economic Development, and Minister for the Status of Women in a reshuffle. In 2012, Collins voted for same-sex marriage when Labor politicians were given a conscience vote. In 2013, Collins gained additional responsibilities as the Minister for Housing and Homelessness and was promoted to the cabinet in the Second Rudd ministry. She remained in these positions until the defeat of the Rudd government in September 2013.

=== Opposition (2013–2022) ===
Collins held her seat in the 2013, 2016 and 2019 federal elections. She served in the shadow cabinet in roles including Shadow Minister for Regional Development and Local Government, Shadow Minister for Ageing and Mental Health, Shadow Minister for Women and Shadow Minister for Agriculture.

=== Albanese government (2022–present) ===
Following the 2022 federal election, Collins was appointed Minister for Housing, Minister for Homelessness and Minister for Small Business in the Albanese ministry. Collins voted for the Restoring Territory Rights Bill 2022 that removed the block on the ability of the Australian Capital Territory and Northern Territory to pass euthanasia laws when Labor politicians were given a conscience vote. Collins launched the government's Regional First Home Buyer Guarantee. Collins introduced the Housing Australia Future Fund bill into parliament.

In the July 2024 reshuffle, she was appointed Minister for Agriculture, Fisheries and Forestry and retained Minister for Small Business until 2025. She held her seat in the 2025 federal election. Collins as Minister led Australia's response to the spread of the H5 bird flu variant that was first confirmed on mainland Australia near Esperance in two species of wild birds in June 2026, and later spread to more bird species and several mammals.

== Personal life ==
Collins has three children with her husband Ian Hubbard.

== See also ==
- Second Gillard ministry
- Second Rudd ministry
- First Albanese ministry
- Second Albanese ministry

Parliament of Australia
Preceded by Harry Quick	Member for Franklin; 2007–present	Incumbent
Political offices
Preceded by Position created	Minister for Community Services; 2011–2013	Succeeded by Mitch Fifield as Assistant Minister for Social Services
Preceded by Mark Arbib	Minister for Indigenous Employment and Economic Development; 2011–2013	Succeeded by Eric Abetz as Minister for Employment
Preceded by Kate Ellis	Minister for the Status of Women; 2011–2013	Succeeded by Michaelia Cash as Minister Assisting the Prime Minister for Women
Preceded by Mark Butler	Minister for Housing and Homelessness; 2013	Succeeded by Kevin Andrews as Minister for Social Services
Preceded by Michael Sukkar	Minister for Housing; 2022–2024	Succeeded by Clare O'Neil
Preceded by Michael Sukkar	Minister for Homelessness; 2022–2024	Succeeded by Clare O'Neil
Preceded by Stuart Robert	Minister for Small Business; 2022–2025	Succeeded by Anne Aly
Preceded by Murray Watt	Minister for Agriculture, Fisheries and Forestry; 2024–present	Incumbent
