= Minister for Defence Personnel =

Australian cabinet position

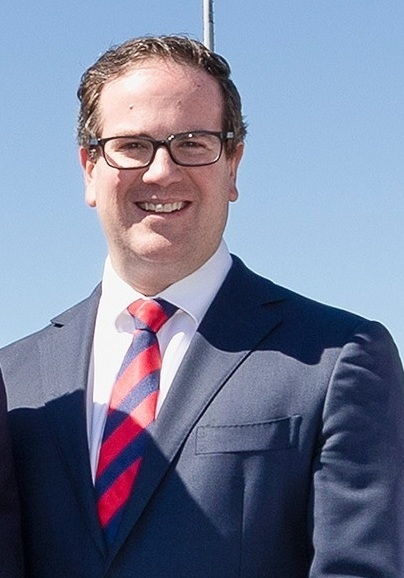
- Incumbent; Matt Keogh since 1 June 2022
- Department of Defence
- Style: The Honourable
- Appointer: Governor-General on the recommendation of the Prime Minister of Australia
- Inaugural holder: Ros Kelly (as Minister for Defence Science and Personnel)
- Formation: 18 September 1987
- Website: www.minister.defence.gov.au/current-ministers/2022-06/matt-keogh

In the Government of Australia, the Minister for Defence Personnel is a position which is currently held by Matt Keogh, after the Albanese ministry was sworn in on 1 June 2022, following the 2022 Australian federal election.

The ministerial portfolio has existed under various names since 1987. The Minister appointed is responsible for oversight of defence personnel and administers the portfolio through the Department of Defence, the Australian Defence Force, the Australian Defence Force Academy, and a range of other agencies.

While ultimately responsible to the Commonwealth of Australia and the Parliament, in practical terms, the minister reports to the Minister for Defence.

== List of ministers for defence personnel ==
The following individuals have been appointed as Minister for Defence Personnel, or any of its precedent titles:

Order	Minister	Party	Prime Minister	Title	Term start	Term end	Term in office
1	Ros Kelly	Labor	Hawke	Minister for Defence Science and Personnel	18 September 1987	6 April 1989	1 year, 200 days
2	David Simmons	Labor	Hawke	Minister for Defence Science and Personnel	6 April 1989	4 April 1990	363 days
3	Gordon Bilney	Labor	Hawke	Minister for Defence Science and Personnel	4 April 1990	20 December 1991	2 years, 354 days
3	Gordon Bilney	Labor	Keating	Minister for Defence Science and Personnel	20 December 1991	24 March 1993	2 years, 354 days
4	John Faulkner	Labor	Keating	Minister for Defence Science and Personnel	24 March 1993	25 March 1994	1 year, 1 day
5	Gary Punch	Labor	Keating	Minister for Defence Science and Personnel	25 March 1994	11 March 1996	1 year, 352 days
6	Bronwyn Bishop	Liberal	Howard	Minister for Defence Industry, Science and Personnel	11 March 1996	21 October 1998	2 years, 224 days
7	Warren Snowdon	Labor	Rudd	Minister for Defence Science and Personnel	3 December 2007	9 June 2009	1 year, 188 days
8	Greg Combet	Labor	Rudd	Minister for Defence Personnel, Materiel and Science	9 June 2009	1 April 2010	296 days
9	Alan Griffin	Labor	Rudd	Minister for Defence Personnel	1 April 2010	24 June 2010	166 days
9	Alan Griffin	Labor	Gillard	Minister for Defence Personnel	24 June 2010	14 September 2010	166 days
(7)	Warren Snowdon	Labor	Gillard	Minister for Defence Science and Personnel	14 September 2010	27 June 2013	3 years, 4 days
(7)	Warren Snowdon	Labor	Rudd	Minister for Defence Science and Personnel	27 June 2013	18 September 2013	3 years, 4 days
10	Mal Brough^{a}	Liberal	Turnbull	Minister for Defence Materiel and Science	21 September 2015	29 December 2015	99 days
acting	Marise Payne^{a}	Liberal	Turnbull	Acting Minister for Defence Materiel and Science	29 December 2015	18 February 2016	51 days
11	Dan Tehan	Liberal	Turnbull	Minister for Defence Personnel	19 July 2016	20 December 2017	1 year, 154 days
12	Michael McCormack	Nationals	Turnbull	Minister for Defence Personnel	20 December 2017	5 March 2018	75 days
13	Darren Chester	Nationals	Turnbull	Minister for Defence Personnel	5 March 2018	28 August 2018	3 years, 119 days
13	Darren Chester	Nationals	Morrison	Minister for Defence Personnel	28 August 2018	2 July 2021	3 years, 119 days
14	Andrew Gee	Nationals	Morrison	Minister for Defence Personnel	2 July 2021	23 May 2022	325 days
15	Matt Keogh	Labor	Albanese	Minister for Defence Personnel; Minister for Veterans' Affairs	1 June 2022	incumbent	4 years, 98 days

== See also ==
- Department of Defence
- Minister for Defence
- Minister for Defence Industry
- Minister for Veterans' Affairs
- Chief of Personnel

== Notes ==
a Minister Mal Brough temporarily stood aside on 29 December 2015. Subsequently, Senator Marise Payne served as Acting Minister for Defence Materiel and Science. Brough later resigned from the Ministry on 13 February 2016 and Payne remained acting in the role until the rearranged ministry was sworn on 18 February 2016.
