= Minister for Cities (Australia) =

Australian cabinet position

- Commonwealth Coat of Arms

- Flag of Australia

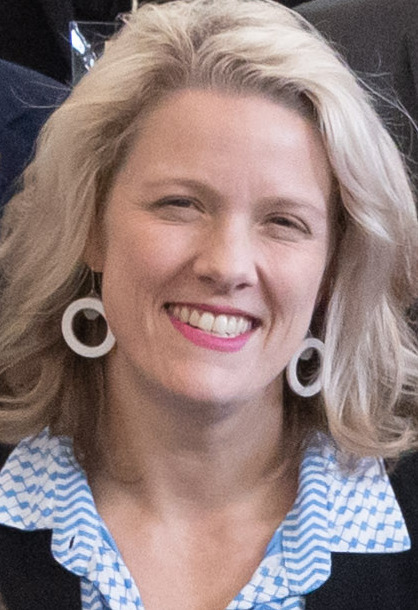
- Incumbent; Clare O'Neil since 13 May 2025
- Department of the Treasury
- Style: The Honourable
- Appointer: Governor-General; on the advice of the prime minister
- Inaugural holder: Tom Uren (as Minister for Urban and Regional Development)
- Formation: 19 December 1972
- Website: ministers.treasury.gov.au/ministers/clare-oneil-2025

The minister for cities is an Australian Government cabinet position which is currently held by Clare O'Neil following her swearing-in on 13 May 2025 as a result of Anthony Albanese's Labor government being re-elected at the 2025 Australian federal election.

== Background ==
The minister for sustainable population, a precedent title for the minister for cities, was a ministerial portfolio administered through the Department of the Treasury responsible for "planning properly for the infrastructure needs, for the housing needs, for the transport needs, for the regional needs" of the Australian population of the future. Originally entitled the Minister for Population by Prime Minister Kevin Rudd, his successor, Julia Gillard, renamed the portfolio to the Minister for Sustainable Population to reflect her policy changes on the matter of population growth and the need for a sustainable future for Australia, saying the change sends a clear message about the new direction the Government is taking. After the 2010 federal election, the portfolio was subsumed by the Sustainability, Environment, Water, Population and Communities portfolio.

== List of ministers for cities ==
The following individuals have served as the minister for cities, or any other precedent titles:

Order	Minister	Party	Prime Minister	Title	Term start	Term end	Term in office
1	Tom Uren	Labor	Whitlam	Minister for Urban and Regional Development	19 December 1972	11 November 1975	2 years, 327 days
2	John Carrick	Liberal	Fraser	Minister for Urban and Regional Development	11 November 1975	22 December 1975	41 days
3	Ivor Greenwood	Liberal	Fraser	Minister for Environment, Housing and Community Development	22 December 1975	8 July 1976	199 days
4	Kevin Newman	Liberal	Fraser	Minister for Environment, Housing and Community Development	8 July 1976	20 December 1977	1 year, 165 days
5	Ray Groom	Liberal	Fraser	Minister for Environment, Housing and Community Development	20 December 1977	5 December 1978	350 days
6	Tony Burke	Labor	Rudd	Minister for Population	14 April 2010	28 June 2010	3 years, 78 days
6	Tony Burke	Labor	Gillard	Minister for Sustainable Population	28 June 2010	14 September 2010	3 years, 78 days
6	Tony Burke	Labor	Gillard	Minister for Sustainability, Environment, Water, Population and Communities	14 September 2010	1 July 2013	3 years, 78 days
7	Jamie Briggs	Liberal	Abbott	Assistant Minister for Infrastructure and Regional Development	18 September 2013	15 September 2015	2 years, 102 days
7	Jamie Briggs	Liberal	Turnbull	Assistant Minister for Infrastructure and Regional Development	15 September 2015	21 September 2015	2 years, 102 days
7	Jamie Briggs	Liberal	Turnbull	Minister for Cities and the Built Environment	21 September 2015	29 December 2015	2 years, 102 days
8	Paul Fletcher	Liberal	Turnbull	Minister for Urban Infrastructure	19 July 2016	20 December 2017	2 years, 39 days
8	Paul Fletcher	Liberal	Turnbull	Minister for Urban Infrastructure and Cities	20 December 2017	28 August 2018	2 years, 39 days
9	Alan Tudge	Liberal	Morrison	Minister for Cities, Urban Infrastructure and Population	28 August 2018	29 May 2019	2 years, 116 days
9	Alan Tudge	Liberal	Morrison	Minister for Population, Cities and Urban Infrastructure	29 May 2019	22 December 2020	2 years, 116 days
(8)	Paul Fletcher	Liberal	Morrison	Minister for Communications, Urban Infrastructure, Cities and the Arts	22 December 2020	23 May 2022	1 year, 152 days
10	Jenny McAllister	Labor	Albanese	Minister for Cities	29 July 2024	13 May 2025	288 days
11	Clare O'Neil	Labor	Albanese	Minister for Cities	13 May 2025	Incumbent	1 year, 189 days
