= Jenny McAllister =

Australian politician (born 1973)

Senator the Honourable Jenny McAllister
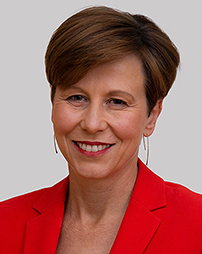

Minister for the National Disability Insurance Scheme
- Incumbent
- Assumed office 13 May 2025
- Prime Minister: Anthony Albanese
- Preceded by: Anne Aly

Minister for Emergency Management
- In office 29 July 2024 – 13 May 2025
- Prime Minister: Anthony Albanese
- Preceded by: Murray Watt
- Succeeded by: Kristy McBain

Minister for Cities
- In office 29 July 2024 – 13 May 2025
- Prime Minister: Anthony Albanese
- Preceded by: Paul Fletcher
- Succeeded by: Clare O’Neil

Assistant Minister for Climate Change and Energy
- In office 1 June 2022 – 28 July 2024
- Preceded by: Tim Wilson (as Assistant Minister for Industry, Energy and Emissions Reduction)
- Succeeded by: Josh Wilson

Senator for New South Wales
- Incumbent
- Assumed office 6 May 2015
- Preceded by: John Faulkner

23rd National President of the Labor Party
- In office 1 July 2011 – 17 June 2015
- Deputy: Tony Sheldon
- Preceded by: Anna Bligh
- Succeeded by: Mark Butler

Personal details
- Born: 21 February 1973 (age 53) Murwillumbah, New South Wales, Australia
- Party: Labor
- Spouse: John Graham
- Profession: Politician
- Website: www.jennymcallister.com.au

Jennifer Ryll McAllister (born 21 February 1973) is an Australian politician. She has been a Senator for New South Wales since 2015 and previously served as National President of the Australian Labor Party from 2011 to 2015. She is from the Labor Left faction of the Labor Party. She was appointed as the Minister for the National Disability Insurance Scheme in 2025, having previously served as the Minister for Emergency Management and Minister for Cities in the first Albanese ministry from 2024.

== Early life and education ==
McAllister was born in Murwillumbah, on the north coast of New South Wales. She was a student at Kingscliff High School from which she achieved her HSC in 1991. She attended the University of Queensland from 1992 to 1995, majoring in politics and government, and the University of Sydney, from which she graduated in 1996 with a Bachelor of Arts with first-class honours, majoring in political economy, politics and government.

== Professional career ==
From 2002 to 2006 McAllister worked as an adviser to the Minister for Environment in the NSW Government. Between 2006 and 2010 she worked as a public servant in the NSW State Government. She subsequently joined AECOM Australia Pty Ltd as Strategic Advisor Water and Climate (2010–2013), progressing to Technical Director – Infrastructure Advisory (2013–2014) and was managing director, Water and Urban Development (2014–2015) and a member of AECOM's ANZ executive when she resigned to join the Senate.

== Political career ==
McAllister is a member of the ALP State Conference (NSW) (1999–present) and the ALP Administrative Committee (NSW) (2000–present). She was previously a member or delegate of the ALP National Policy Committee on Foreign Affairs (1998–2000), the ALP National Policy Committee (2006–2007). She has been the director of several election campaigns.

McAllister was the co-founder of the Labor Environmental Activist Network (known as LEAN).

McAllister was the Labor candidate for the seat of Richmond in the 2001 federal election.

On 25 November 2011, McAllister was elected as National President of the ALP, serving until the conclusion of her term at the 2015 Australian Labor Party National Conference, where she was replaced by Mark Butler.

=== Opposition (2015–2022) ===
In July 2014, Jenny McAllister was selected to run on the Labor senate ticket at the 2016 election in the number two position, replacing John Faulkner, and considered a winnable spot. However, on 6 February 2015, John Faulkner resigned from the Senate, creating a casual vacancy. On 6 May 2015, McAllister was elected by a joint sitting of the NSW Parliament to fill the vacancy.

In August 2018 she was appointed Shadow Assistant Minister for Families and Communities. On 30 August 2016 to 21 August 2018 she was Opposition Deputy Whip in the Senate. From 2 June 2019 to 23 May 2022 she served as Secretary to the Shadow Cabinet.

=== Albanese government (2022–present) ===
Following the 2022 federal election, on 1 June 2022 McAllister was appointed the Assistant Minister for Climate Change and Energy. In the July 2024 reshuffle, she was appointed Minister for Emergency Management and made the Minister for Cities in a re-created role last held in May 2022.

On 13 May 2025, McAllister was appointed the Minister for the National Disability Insurance Scheme in a reshuffle following the 2025 federal election.

== Personal life ==
McAllister is married to John Graham—former assistant general secretary of the NSW branch of the Labor Party and member of the Legislative Council. She has two children. She lives with her family in Alexandria in NSW.

McAllister owns an investment property in Redfern in NSW.

She also owns a property with her husband in Wentworth Falls in NSW, which is managed for the purposes of environment conservation and recreation.

Parliament of Australia
Preceded by John Faulkner	Senator for New South Wales; 2015−present	Incumbent
Political offices
Preceded by Paul Fletcher	Minister for Cities; 2024–2025	Succeeded by Clare O'Neil
Preceded by Murray Watt	Minister for Emergency Management; 2024−2025	Succeeded by Kristy McBain
Preceded by Anne Aly	Minister for the National Disability Insurance Scheme; 2025−present	Incumbent
Party political offices
Preceded by Anna Bligh	National President of the Australian Labor Party; 2011–2015	Succeeded by Mark Butler
