= Matt Keogh =

Australian politician

The Honourable Matt Keogh MP
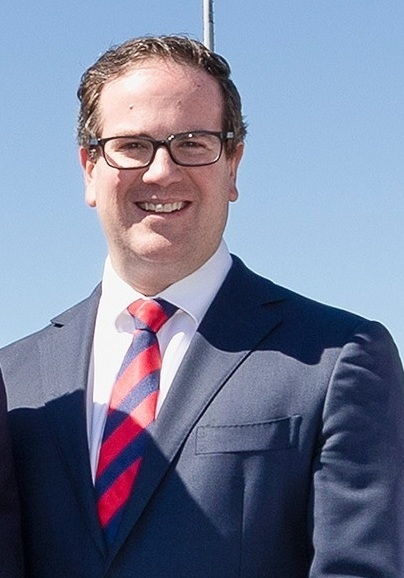
- Keogh in 2023

Minister for Veterans Affairs
- Incumbent
- Assumed office 1 June 2022
- Prime Minister: Anthony Albanese
- Preceded by: Andrew Gee

Minister for Defence Personnel
- Incumbent
- Assumed office 1 June 2022
- Prime Minister: Anthony Albanese
- Preceded by: Andrew Gee

Member of the Australian Parliament for Burt
- Incumbent
- Assumed office 2 July 2016
- Preceded by: new seat

Personal details
- Born: Matthew James Keogh; 11 November 1981 (age 44) Armadale, Western Australia, Australia
- Spouse: Annabel
- Education: University of Notre Dame Australia
- Website: www.mattkeogh.com

Matthew James Keogh (born 11 November 1981) is an Australian politician. He is a member of the Australian Labor Party (ALP) and has been Minister for Veterans' Affairs and Minister for Defence Personnel in the Albanese government since 2022. He has been a member of the House of Representatives since 2016, representing the Western Australian seat of Burt. He worked as a lawyer before entering politics.

== Early life ==
Keogh was born on 11 November 1981 in Armadale, Western Australia. He is the son of Helen (née Travers) and Colin Keogh. His maternal grandfather Peter Travers was "the first lawyer in the Armadale–Gosnells area".

Keogh grew up in the Kelmscott Hills, attending Mazenod College. He went on to the University of Notre Dame Australia, completing a Bachelor of Arts (Hons.) in politics and history and a Bachelor of Laws. While at university he worked as a customer service officer for iiNet. He was also a clerk and bookkeeper at his mother's law firm Travers & Keogh, where he later worked as a solicitor from 2005 to 2006.

Keogh was a policy officer at the state Department of Premier and Cabinet from 2003 to 2005. He joined the Commonwealth Director of Public Prosecutions as a prosecutor in 2006, before moving to private practice in 2011 as a commercial lawyer with Herbert Smith Freehills. He served as president of the Law Society of Western Australia in 2015 and was a director of the Law Council of Australia.

== Political career ==
Keogh joined the Australian Labor Party in 1997 and was state president of Young Labor in 2007. He is a member of Labor Right.

After being unsuccessful as Labor's candidate at the September 2015 federal by-election in Canning, which precipitated Malcolm Turnbull deposing Tony Abbott as Prime Minister of Australia, Keogh ran successfully in the 2016 federal election for the electorate of Burt. The new seat included a third of Canning's old territory, and on paper was notionally Liberal. However, it included much of the more urbanised portion of the old Canning, and much of the seat's territory was represented by Labor at state level. Keogh won the seat on a swing of more than 13 points.

Following his election in 2016, Keogh was elected the deputy chair of the Labor Caucus, appointed the Labor Opposition Waste Watch spokesperson and became a member of the House Economics Committee, which was tasked with inquiring into the Australian banks, as well as the House Agriculture & Water Committee and the Parliamentary Joint Committee on Corporations and Financial Services. Keogh was re-elected in 2019. Following the 2019 election, Keogh was elected to the Labor front bench and allocated the portfolios of Shadow Minister for Defence Industry, Shadow Minister for WA Resources and Shadow Minister Assisting for Small and Family Business.

After the ALP's victory at the 2022 election, Keogh was appointed Minister for Veterans' Affairs and Minister for Defence Personnel in the Albanese government.

== Personal ==
Keogh met his wife at law school and the two married in 2011. They have two sons.

Parliament of Australia
New seat	Member for Burt; 2016–present	Incumbent
Political offices
Preceded by Andrew Gee	Minister for Veterans' Affairs; 2022–present	Incumbent
Preceded by Andrew Gee	Minister for Defence Personnel; 2022–present	Incumbent
