= Kristy McBain =

Australian politician

The Honourable Kristy McBain MP
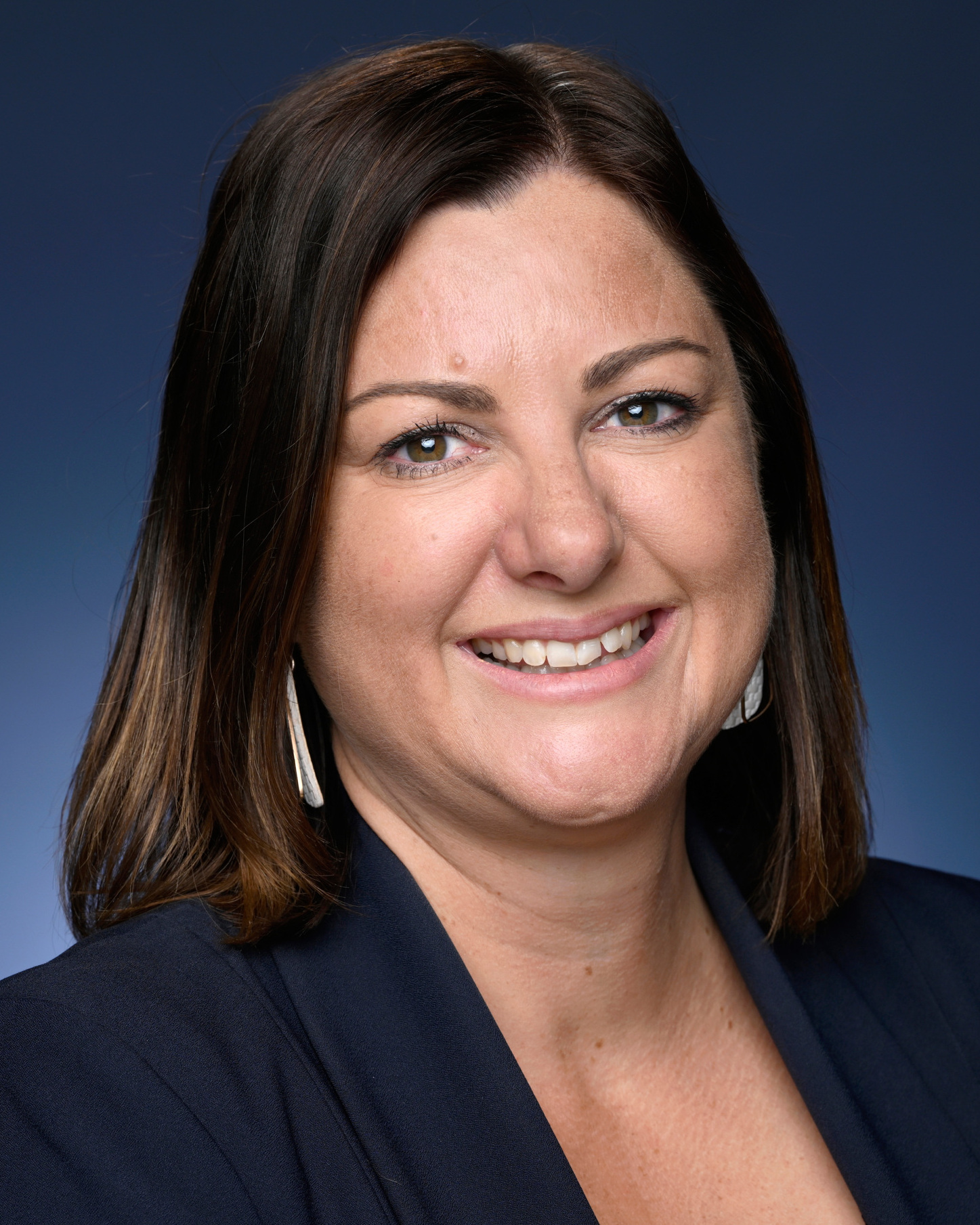
- Official portrait, 2023

Minister for Regional Development, Local Government and Territories
- Incumbent
- Assumed office 1 June 2022
- Prime Minister: Anthony Albanese
- Preceded by: Nola Marino

Minister for Emergency Management
- Incumbent
- Assumed office 13 May 2025
- Prime Minister: Anthony Albanese
- Preceded by: Jenny McAllister

Member of the Australian Parliament for Eden-Monaro
- Incumbent
- Assumed office 4 July 2020
- Preceded by: Mike Kelly

Mayor of Bega Valley Shire
- In office 29 September 2016 – 1 March 2020
- Preceded by: Michael Britten
- Succeeded by: Sharon Tapscott

Personal details
- Born: 29 September 1982 (age 44) Traralgon, Victoria, Australia
- Party: Labor
- Spouse: Brad McBain
- Children: 3
- Education: University of Canberra
- Website: www.kristymcbain.com.au

Kristy Louise McBain (born 29 September 1982) is an Australian politician who has been a member of the Australian House of Representatives for the Division of Eden-Monaro since 2020. She has served as the Minister for Regional Development, Local Government and Territories since 2022, and Minister for Emergency Management since 2025.

== Early life and education ==
Kristy McBain was born in Traralgon, Australia, on 29 September 1982. She attended Eden Marine High School. She grew up in Victoria before moving to New South Wales in the 1990s. She graduated from the University of Canberra with a bachelor's degree and Bachelor of Laws. She worked as a pharmacy assistant from 1995 to 2003, a waitress from 2000 to 2004, and library assistant from 2002 to 2005. She was a paralegal from 2004 to 2005, and a lawyer from 2005 to 2018.

== Career ==
From 2012 to 2020, McBain served as a councillor for Bega Valley Shire. She was mayor of Bega Valley Shire from 2016 to 2020.

Mike Kelly, a member of the Australian House of Representatives for the Division of Eden-Monaro, resigned. McBain, as the nominee of the Labor Party, won a 2020 by-election to replace him. She is the first woman to represent the constituency. She was reelected in 2022 and 2025.

Prime Minister Anthony Albanese appointed McBain as Minister for Regional Development, Local Government and Territories in 2022. She was appointed as Minister for Emergency Management in 2025.

In 2025, a government plan for removing the residents of Cocos (Keeling) Islands over the course of 10 to 50 years in response to climate change was released by the Australian Broadcasting Corporation. The Cocos Malays opposed this plan as it would threaten their cultural connections. McBain said that she supported the residents' desire to remain.

== Personal life ==
McBain married Brad, with whom she had three children.

== Works cited ==
=== News ===
- Barlow, Karen (10 July 2026). "Kristy McBain: Labor's secret weapon against One Nation". The Saturday Paper. Archived from the original on 10 July 2026.
- Bates, Alistair (10 April 2026). "Plans to move residents off Cocos (Keeling) Islands walked back after backlash". Australian Broadcasting Corporation. Archived from the original on 9 November 2026.

=== Web ===
- "About Kristy McBain". Kristy McBain. Archived from the original on 9 November 2026.
- "Hon Kristy McBain MP". Parliament of Australia. Archived from the original on 9 November 2026.
- "Kristy McBain". Australian Labor Party. Archived from the original on 9 November 2026.
- "Politics in the Pub: Mum, Mayor, Member, Minister". The Australia Institute. 27 June 2024. Archived from the original on 19 July 2024.

Parliament of Australia
Preceded by Mike Kelly	Member for Eden-Monaro; 2020–present	Incumbent
Political offices
Preceded by Nola Marino	Minister for Regional Development, Local Government and Territories; 2022–present	Incumbent
Preceded by Jenny McAllister	Minister for Emergency Management; 2025−present	Incumbent
