= Minister for Emergency Management =

Australian cabinet position

- Commonwealth Coat of Arms

- Flag of Australia

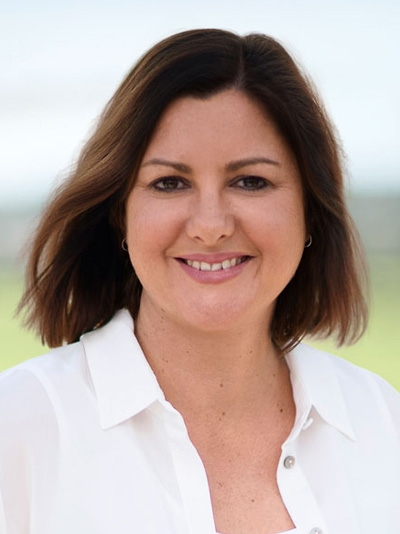
- Incumbent; Kristy McBain since 13 May 2025
- Department of Home Affairs
- Style: The Honourable
- Appointer: Governor-General on the recommendation of the Prime Minister of Australia
- Inaugural holder: Robert McClelland
- Formation: 14 December 2011
- Website: minister.homeaffairs.gov.au/KristyMcBain/Pages/Welcome.aspx

The Minister for Emergency Management is an Australian Government cabinet position which is currently held by Kristy McBain since May 2025 in the Albanese government.

In the Government of Australia, the minister administers this portfolio through the Department of Home Affairs.

== List of ministers ==
=== Emergency management ===
The following individuals have been appointed as Minister for Emergency Management, or any of its precedent titles:

Order	Minister	Party	Ministry	Title	Term start	Term end	Term in office	Ref
1	Robert McClelland	Labor	2nd Gillard	Minister for Emergency Management	14 December 2011	5 March 2012	82 days	
2	Nicola Roxon	Labor	2nd Gillard	Minister for Emergency Management	5 March 2012	4 February 2013	336 days	
3	Mark Dreyfus	Labor	2nd Gillard; 2nd Rudd	Minister for Emergency Management	4 February 2013	18 September 2013	226 days	
4	Linda Reynolds	Liberal	1st Morrison	Minister for Emergency Management and North Queensland Recovery	2 March 2019	29 May 2019	88 days	
5	David Littleproud	National (LNP)	2nd Morrison	Minister for Water Resources, Drought, Rural Finance, Natural Disaster and Emergency Management	29 May 2019	6 February 2020	2 years, 34 days	
5	David Littleproud	National (LNP)	2nd Morrison	Minister for Agriculture, Drought and Emergency Management	6 February 2020	2 July 2021	2 years, 34 days	
6	Bridget McKenzie	National	2nd Morrison	Minister for Emergency Management and National Recovery and Resilience	2 July 2021	23 May 2022	325 days	
7	Murray Watt	Labor	Albanese	Minister for Emergency Management	1 June 2022	29 July 2024	2 years, 58 days	
8	Jenny McAllister	Labor	Albanese	Minister for Emergency Management	29 July 2024	13 May 2025	288 days	
9	Kristy McBain	Labor	Albanese	Minister for Emergency Management	13 May 2025	Incumbent	1 year, 117 days	

=== Assisting the attorney-general on Queensland floods recovery ===
The following individuals have been appointed as Minister Assisting the Attorney-General on Queensland Floods Recovery, or any of its precedent titles:

Order	Minister	Party	Ministry	Title	Term start	Term end	Term in office	Ref
1	Joe Ludwig	Labor	2nd Gillard	Minister Assisting the Attorney-General on Queensland Floods Recovery	26 January 2011	1 July 2013	2 years, 156 days	

== List of assistant ministers ==
Order	Minister	Party	Ministry	Title	Term start	Term end	Term in office	Reference
1	Josh Wilson	Labor	2nd Albanese	Assistant Minister for Emergency Management	13 May 2025	Incumbent	1 year, 117 days	
