= List of female cabinet ministers of Australia =

This pages lists all female cabinet-level ministers of Australia.

| Image | Minister | Position | Time Period | Party |
|---|---|---|---|---|
| | Enid Lyons | Vice-President of the Executive Council | 1949–1951 | Liberal |
| | Margaret Guilfoyle | Minister for Education | 1975 | Liberal |
| | Margaret Guilfoyle | Minister for Social Security | 1976–1980 | Liberal |
| | Margaret Guilfoyle | Minister for Finance | 1980–1983 | Liberal |
| | Susan Ryan | Minister for Education and Youth Affairs | 1983–1984 | Labor |
| | Susan Ryan | Minister Assisting the Prime Minister for the Status of Women | 1983–1988 | Labor |
| | Susan Ryan | Minister for Education | 1984–1987 | Labor |
| | Susan Ryan | Special Minister of State | 1987–1988 | Labor |
| | Susan Ryan | Minister Assisting the Prime Minister for the Bicentennial | 1987–1988 | Labor |
| | Susan Ryan | Minister Assisting the Minister for Community Services and Health | 1987–1988 | Labor |
| | Ros Kelly | Minister for the Arts, Sport, the Environment, Tourism and Territories | 1990–1991 | Labor |
| | Ros Kelly | Minister for the Arts, Sport, the Environment and Territories | 1991–1993 | Labor |
| | Ros Kelly | Minister for the Environment, Sport and Territories | 1993–1994 | Labor |
| | Ros Kelly | Minister Assisting the Prime Minister for the Status of Women | 1993–1994 | Labor |
| | Carmen Lawrence | Minister for Human Services and Health | 1994–1996 | Labor |
| | Carmen Lawrence | Minister Assisting the Prime Minister for the Status of Women | 1994–1996 | Labor |
| | Jocelyn Newman | Minister for Social Security | 1996–1998 | Liberal |
| | Jocelyn Newman | Minister Assisting the Prime Minister for the Status of Women | 1996–1997 | Liberal |
| | Jocelyn Newman | Minister for Family and Community Services | 1998–2001 | Liberal |
| | Jocelyn Newman | Minister Assisting the Prime Minister for the Status of Women | 1998–2001 | Liberal |
| | Amanda Vanstone | Minister for Employment, Education, Training and Youth Affairs | 1996–1997 | Liberal |
| | Amanda Vanstone | Minister for Family and Community Services | 2001–2003 | Liberal |
| | Amanda Vanstone | Minister Assisting the Prime Minister for the Status of Women | 2001–2003 | Liberal |
| | Amanda Vanstone | Minister for Immigration and Multicultural and Indigenous Affairs | 2003–2006 | Liberal |
| | Amanda Vanstone | Minister Assisting the Prime Minister for Reconciliation | 2003–2004 | Liberal |
| | Amanda Vanstone | Minister Assisting the Prime Minister for Indigenous Affairs | 2004–2006 | Liberal |
| | Amanda Vanstone | Minister for Immigration and Multicultural Affairs | 2006–2007 | Liberal |
| | Kay Patterson | Minister for Health and Ageing | 2001–2003 | Liberal |
| | Kay Patterson | Minister for Family and Community Services | 2003–2006 | Liberal |
| | Kay Patterson | Minister Assisting the Prime Minister for the Status of Women | 2003–2004 | Liberal |
| | Kay Patterson | Minister Assisting the Prime Minister for Women's Issues | 2004–2006 | Liberal |
| | Helen Coonan | Minister for Communications, Information Technology and the Arts | 2004–2007 | Liberal |
| | Helen Coonan | Deputy Leader of the Government in the Senate | 2006–2007 | Liberal |
| | Julie Bishop | Minister for Education, Science and Training | 2006–2007 | Liberal |
| | Julie Bishop | Minister Assisting the Prime Minister for Women's Issues | 2006–2007 | Liberal |
| | Julie Bishop | Minister for Foreign Affairs | 2013–2018 | Liberal |
| | Julia Gillard | Deputy Prime Minister | 2007–2010 | Labor |
| | Julia Gillard | Minister for Education | 2007–2010 | Labor |
| | Julia Gillard | Minister for Employment and Workplace Relations | 2007–2010 | Labor |
| | Julia Gillard | Minister for Social Inclusion | 2007–2010 | Labor |
| | Julia Gillard | Prime Minister | 2010–2013 | Labor |
| | Nicola Roxon | Minister for Health and Ageing | 2007–2011 | Labor |
| | Nicola Roxon | Attorney-General | 2011–2013 | Labor |
| | Nicola Roxon | Minister for Emergency Management | 2012–2013 | Labor |
| | Jenny Macklin | Minister for Families, Housing, Community Services and Indigenous Affairs | 2007–2011 | Labor |
| | Jenny Macklin | Minister for Families, Community Services and Indigenous Affairs | 2011–2013 | Labor |
| | Jenny Macklin | Minister for Disability Reform | 2011–2013 | Labor |
| | Penny Wong | Minister for Climate Change and Water | 2007–2010 | Labor |
| | Penny Wong | Minister for Climate Change, Energy Efficiency and Water | 2010 | Labor |
| | Penny Wong | Minister for Finance and Deregulation | 2010–2013 | Labor |
| | Penny Wong | Deputy Leader of the Government in the Senate | 2013 | Labor |
| | Penny Wong | Leader of the Government in the Senate | 2013 | Labor |
| | Penny Wong | Minister for Foreign Affairs | 2022–present | Labor |
| | Penny Wong | Leader of the Government in the Senate | 2022–present | Labor |
| | Tanya Plibersek | Minister for Health | 2011–2013 | Labor |
| | Tanya Plibersek | Minister for Health and Medical Research | 2013 | Labor |
| | Tanya Plibersek | Minister for the Environment and Water | 2022–2025 | Labor |
| | Tanya Plibersek | Minister for Social Services | 2025–present | Labor |
| | Jacinta Collins | Minister for Mental Health and Ageing | 2013 | Labor |
| | Jacinta Collins | Deputy Leader of the Government in the Senate | 2013 | Labor |
| | Jacinta Collins | Manager of Government Business in the Senate | 2013 | Labor |
| | Julie Collins | Minister for Housing and Homelessness | 2013 | Labor |
| | Julie Collins | Minister for Community Services | 2013 | Labor |
| | Julie Collins | Minister for Indigenous Employment and Economic Development | 2013 | Labor |
| | Julie Collins | Minister for the Status of Women | 2013 | Labor |
| | Julie Collins | Minister for Housing | 2022–2024 | Labor |
| | Julie Collins | Minister for Homelessness | 2022–2024 | Labor |
| | Julie Collins | Minister for Small Business | 2022–2025 | Labor |
| | Julie Collins | Minister for Agriculture, Fisheries and Forestry | 2024–present | Labor |
| | Catherine King | Minister for Regional Australia, Local Government and Territories | 2013 | Labor |
| | Catherine King | Minister for Infrastructure, Transport, Regional Development and Local Government | 2022–present | Labor |
| | Sussan Ley | Minister for Health | 2014–2016 | Liberal |
| | Sussan Ley | Minister for Sport | 2014–2017 | Liberal |
| | Sussan Ley | Minister for Aged Care | 2015–2016 | Liberal |
| | Sussan Ley | Minister for Health and Aged Care | 2016–2017 | Liberal |
| | Sussan Ley | Minister for the Environment | 2019–2022 | Liberal |
| | Marise Payne | Minister for Defence | 2015–2018 | Liberal |
| | Marise Payne | Minister for Foreign Affairs | 2018–2022 | Liberal |
| | Marise Payne | Minister for Women | 2019–2022 | Liberal |
| | Michaelia Cash | Minister for Employment | 2015–2017 | Liberal |
| | Michaelia Cash | Minister for Women | 2015–2017 | Liberal |
| | Michaelia Cash | Minister Assisting the Prime Minister for the Public Service | 2015–2017 | Liberal |
| | Michaelia Cash | Minister for Jobs and Innovation | 2017–2018 | Liberal |
| | Michaelia Cash | Minister for Small and Family Business, Skills and Vocational Education | 2018–2019 | Liberal |
| | Michaelia Cash | Minister for Employment, Skills, Small and Family Business | 2019–2021 | Liberal |
| | Michaelia Cash | Deputy Leader of the Government in the Senate | 2020–2022 | Liberal |
| | Michaelia Cash | Attorney-General | 2021–2022 | Liberal |
| | Michaelia Cash | Minister for Industrial Relations | 2021–2022 | Liberal |
| | Kelly O'Dwyer | Assistant Treasurer | 2015–2016 | Liberal |
| | Kelly O'Dwyer | Minister for Small Business | 2015–2016 | Liberal |
| | Kelly O'Dwyer | Minister for Revenue and Financial Services | 2016–2018 | Liberal |
| | Kelly O'Dwyer | Minister for Women | 2017–2019 | Liberal |
| | Kelly O'Dwyer | Minister Assisting the Prime Minister for the Public Service | 2017–2018 | Liberal |
| | Kelly O'Dwyer | Minister for Jobs and Industrial Relations | 2018–2019 | Liberal |
| | Fiona Nash | Minister for Rural Health | 2016 | National |
| | Fiona Nash | Minister for Regional Communications | 2016–2017 | National |
| | Fiona Nash | Minister for Regional Development | 2016–2017 | National |
| | Fiona Nash | Minister for Local Government and Territories | 2016–2017 | National |
| | Bridget McKenzie | Minister for Rural Health | 2017–2018 | National |
| | Bridget McKenzie | Minister for Regional Communications | 2017–2018 | National |
| | Bridget McKenzie | Minister for Sport | 2017–2019 | National |
| | Bridget McKenzie | Minister for Regional Services, Local Government and Decentralisation | 2018–2019 | National |
| | Bridget McKenzie | Minister for Agriculture | 2019–2020 | National |
| | Bridget McKenzie | Minister for Emergency Management and National Recovery and Resilience | 2021–2022 | National |
| | Bridget McKenzie | Minister for Regionalisation, Regional Communications and Regional Education | 2021–2022 | National |
| | Karen Andrews | Minister for Industry, Science and Technology | 2018–2021 | Liberal |
| | Karen Andrews | Minister for Home Affairs | 2021–2022 | Liberal |
| | Melissa Price | Minister for the Environment | 2018–2019 | Liberal |
| | Melissa Price | Minister for Defence Industry | 2021–2022 | Liberal |
| | Melissa Price | Minister for Science and Technology | 2021–2022 | Liberal |
| | Linda Reynolds | Minister for Defence Industry | 2019 | Liberal |
| | Linda Reynolds | Minister for Emergency Management and North Queensland Recovery | 2019 | Liberal |
| | Linda Reynolds | Minister for Defence | 2019–2021 | Liberal |
| | Linda Reynolds | Minister for Government Services | 2021–2022 | Liberal |
| | Linda Reynolds | Minister for the National Disability Insurance Scheme | 2021–2022 | Liberal |
| | Anne Ruston | Minister for Families and Social Services | 2019–2022 | Liberal |
| | Anne Ruston | Manager of Government Business in the Senate | 2019–2022 | Liberal |
| | Anne Ruston | Minister for Women's Safety | 2021–2022 | Liberal |
| | Katy Gallagher | Attorney-General | 2022 | Labor |
| | Katy Gallagher | Minister for Finance | 2022–present | Labor |
| | Katy Gallagher | Minister for the Public Service | 2022–present | Labor |
| | Katy Gallagher | Minister for Women | 2022–present | Labor |
| | Katy Gallagher | Vice-President of the Executive Council | 2022–present | Labor |
| | Katy Gallagher | Manager of Government Business in the Senate | 2022–present | Labor |
| | Katy Gallagher | Minister for Government Services | 2025–present | Labor |
| | Amanda Rishworth | Minister for Social Services | 2022–2025 | Labor |
| | Amanda Rishworth | Minister for the National Disability Insurance Scheme | 2025 | Labor |
| | Amanda Rishworth | Minister for Employment and Workplace Relations | 2025–present | Labor |
| | Linda Burney | Minister for Indigenous Australians | 2022–2024 | Labor |
| | Michelle Rowland | Minister for Communications | 2022–2025 | Labor |
| | Michelle Rowland | Attorney-General | 2025–present | Labor |
| | Madeleine King | Minister for Resources | 2022–present | Labor |
| | Madeleine King | Minister for Northern Australia | 2022–present | Labor |
| | Clare O'Neil | Minister for Home Affairs | 2022–2024 | Labor |
| | Clare O'Neil | Minister for Cyber Security | 2022–2024 | Labor |
| | Clare O'Neil | Minister for Housing | 2024–present | Labor |
| | Clare O'Neil | Minister for Homelessness | 2024–present | Labor |
| | Clare O'Neil | Minister for Cities | 2025–present | Labor |
| | Malarndirri McCarthy | Minister for Indigenous Australians | 2024–present | Labor |
| | Anika Wells | Minister for Aged Care | 2025 | Labor |
| | Anika Wells | Minister for Sport | 2025–present | Labor |
| | Anika Wells | Minister for Communications | 2025–present | Labor |
| | Anne Aly | Minister for Small Business | 2025–present | Labor |
| | Anne Aly | Minister for International Development | 2025–present | Labor |
| | Anne Aly | Minister for Multicultural Affairs | 2025–present | Labor |

== See also ==
- Cabinet (government)
- Cabinet of Australia
- Politics of Australia
