= Gillard ministry =

Gillard ministry may refer to:

- First Gillard ministry
- Second Gillard ministry
