= 2011 cabinet reshuffle =

2011 cabinet reshuffle may refer to:

- 2011 Australian cabinet reshuffle
- 2011 Burmese cabinet reshuffle
- 2011 Indonesian cabinet reshuffle
- 2011 Serbian cabinet reshuffle
- 2011 Tongan cabinet reshuffle

== See also ==
- 2010 cabinet reshuffle
- 2012 cabinet reshuffle
