= First Gillard ministry =

65th ministry of government of Australia

- 65th ministry of Australia

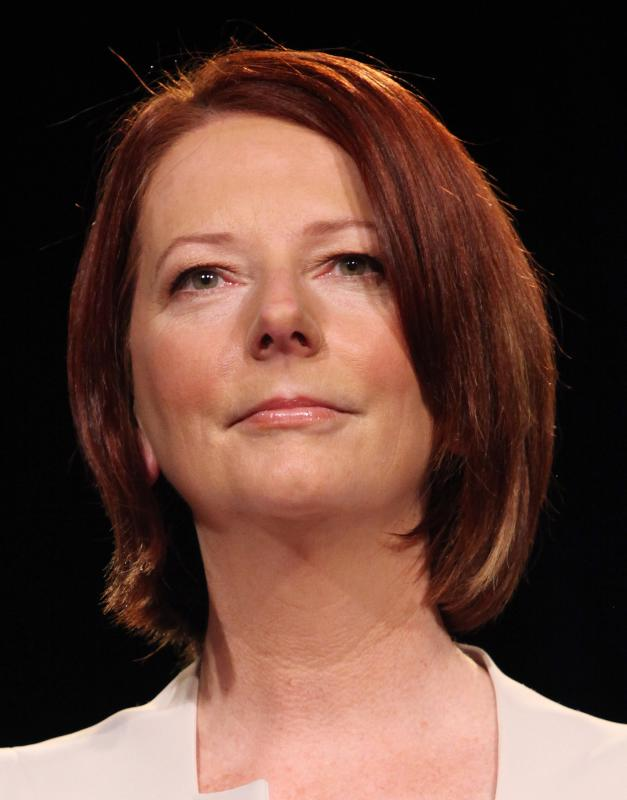
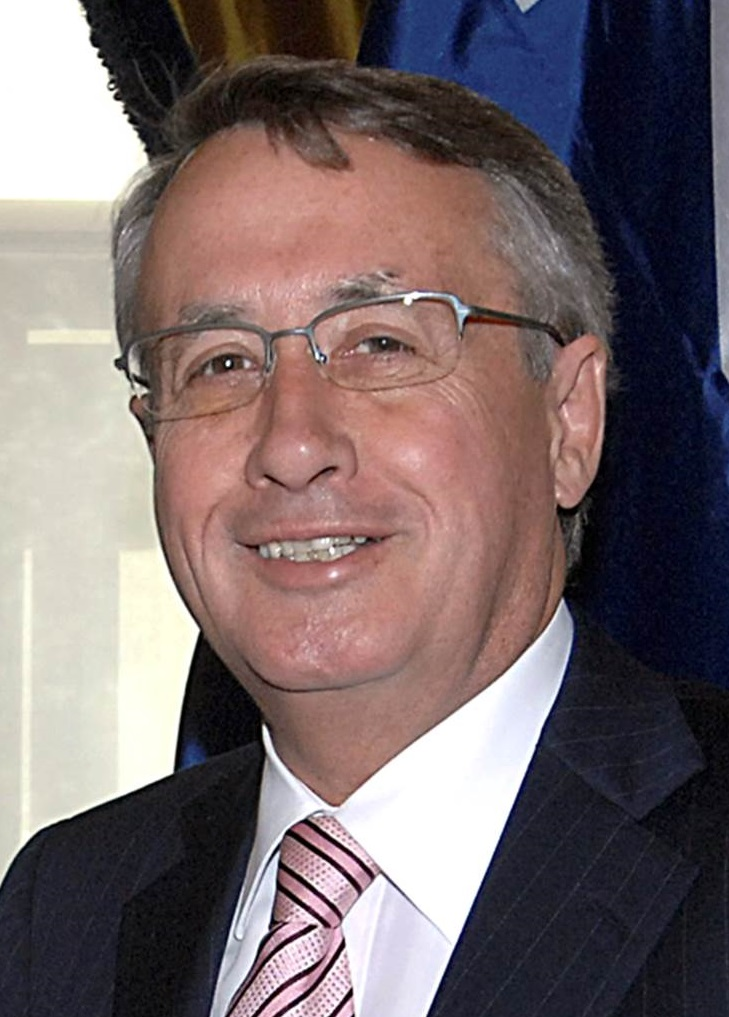
- Julia Gillard Wayne Swan
- Date formed: 24 June 2010
- Date dissolved: 14 September 2010

People and organisations
- Monarch: Elizabeth II
- Governor-General: Quentin Bryce
- Prime Minister: Julia Gillard
- Deputy Prime Minister: Wayne Swan
- Member party: Labor
- Status in legislature: Majority government
- Opposition cabinet: Abbott
- Opposition party: Liberal/National Coalition
- Opposition leader: Tony Abbott

History
- Outgoing election: 21 August 2010
- Legislature term: 42nd
- Predecessor: First Rudd ministry
- Successor: Second Gillard ministry

The First Gillard ministry (Labor) was the 65th ministry of the Australian Government and was led by the prime minister, Julia Gillard. It succeeded the first Rudd ministry upon its swearing in by the Governor-General of Australia, Quentin Bryce, on 24 June 2010. It was replaced by the second Gillard ministry on 14 September 2010 after the 2010 election.

The change in ministry followed a series of events on 23–24 June that led to the Prime Minister, Kevin Rudd, first calling a leadership ballot within the governing Labor Party after being challenged by his deputy, Julia Gillard, and then declining to contest it, allowing Gillard to win the leadership unopposed. The initial form of the First Gillard Ministry was identical to the final form of the first Rudd ministry, apart from Gillard's appointment as prime minister and Wayne Swan as deputy prime minister, and the departure of Rudd as a minister. A minor reshuffle was announced on 28 June, with Simon Crean to assume responsibility for Gillard's former portfolios of Education, Employment and Workplace Relations and Social Inclusion. Stephen Smith was assigned the Trade portfolio in addition to his Foreign Affairs portfolio.

== Cabinet ==
Officeholder	Office(s)
Julia Gillard MP	Prime Minister; Minister for Education (to 28 June 2010); Minister for Employment and Workplace Relations (to 28 June 2010); Minister for Social Inclusion (to 28 June 2010); Leader of the Labor Party
Wayne Swan MP	Deputy Prime Minister; Treasurer; Minister for Finance and Deregulation (from 3 September 2010); Deputy Leader of the Labor Party
Senator Chris Evans	Minister for Immigration and Citizenship
Senator John Faulkner	Minister for Defence; Vice-President of the Executive Council
Simon Crean MP	Minister for Trade (until 28 June 2010); Minister for Education (from 28 June 2010); Minister for Employment and Workplace Relations (from 28 June 2010); Minister for Social Inclusion (from 28 June 2010)
Stephen Smith MP	Minister for Foreign Affairs; Minister for Trade (from 28 June 2010)
Nicola Roxon MP	Minister for Health and Ageing
Jenny Macklin MP	Minister for Families, Housing, Community Services and Indigenous Affairs
Lindsay Tanner MP	Minister for Finance and Deregulation (to 3 September 2010)
Anthony Albanese MP	Minister for Infrastructure, Transport, Regional Development and Local Government
Senator Stephen Conroy	Minister for Broadband, Communications and the Digital Economy
Senator Kim Carr	Minister for Innovation, Industry, Science and Research
Senator Penny Wong	Minister for Climate Change, Energy Efficiency and Water
Peter Garrett MP	Minister for Environment Protection, Heritage and the Arts
Robert McClelland MP	Attorney-General
Senator Joe Ludwig	Cabinet Secretary; Special Minister of State
Tony Burke MP	Minister for Agriculture, Fisheries and Forestry; Minister for Sustainable Population
Martin Ferguson MP	Minister for Resources and Energy; Minister for Tourism
Chris Bowen MP	Minister for Human Services; Minister for Financial Services, Superannuation and Corporate Law

== Outer ministry ==
Officeholder	Office(s)
Alan Griffin MP	Minister for Veterans' Affairs; Minister for Defence Personnel
Tanya Plibersek MP	Minister for Housing; Minister for the Status of Women
Brendan O'Connor MP	Minister for Home Affairs
Warren Snowdon MP	Minister for Indigenous Health, Rural and Regional Health and Regional Services Delivery
Craig Emerson MP	Minister for Small Business, Independent Contractors and the Service Economy; Minister for Competition Policy and Consumer Affairs; Minister assisting the Finance Minister on Deregulation.
Senator Nick Sherry	Assistant Treasurer
Justine Elliot MP	Minister for Ageing
Kate Ellis MP	Minister for Early Childhood Education, Child Care and Youth; Minister for Sport
Greg Combet MP	Minister for Defence Material and Science; Minister assisting the Minister for Climate Change and Energy Efficiency
Senator Mark Arbib	Minister for Employment Participation; Minister assisting the Prime Minister for Government Service Delivery

== Parliamentary secretaries ==
Officeholder	Office(s)
Maxine McKew MP	Parliamentary Secretary for Infrastructure, Transport, Regional Development and Local Government
Mike Kelly MP	Parliamentary Secretary for Defence Support; Parliamentary Secretary for Water
Gary Gray MP	Parliamentary Secretary for Western and Northern Australia
Bill Shorten MP	Parliamentary Secretary for Disabilities and Children's Services (Families, Housing, Community Services and Indigenous Affairs portfolio); Parliamentary Secretary for Victorian Bushfire Reconstruction
Bob McMullan MP	Parliamentary Secretary for International Development Assistance
Anthony Byrne MP	Parliamentary Secretary to the Prime Minister; Parliamentary Secretary for Trade
Senator Ursula Stephens	Parliamentary Secretary for Social Inclusion; Parliamentary Secretary for the Voluntary Sector
Laurie Ferguson MP	Parliamentary Secretary for Multicultural Affairs and Settlement Services
Jason Clare MP	Parliamentary Secretary for Employment
Mark Butler MP	Parliamentary Secretary for Health
Richard Marles MP	Parliamentary Secretary for Industry and Innovation

== See also ==
- Second Gillard ministry
