= 2012 cabinet reshuffle =

2012 cabinet reshuffle may refer to:

- 2012 British cabinet reshuffle
- 2012 Burmese cabinet reshuffle
- 2012 Namibian cabinet reshuffle
- 2012 Norwegian cabinet reshuffle
- 2012 Scottish cabinet reshuffle
- 2012 Singaporean cabinet reshuffle

== See also ==
- 2011 cabinet reshuffle
- 2013 cabinet reshuffle
