= 2016 cabinet reshuffle =

2016 cabinet reshuffle may refer to:

- 2016 Australian cabinet reshuffle
- 2016 British shadow cabinet reshuffle
- 2016 Indonesian cabinet reshuffle
- 2016 Norwegian cabinet reshuffle
- 2016 Swedish cabinet reshuffle

== See also ==
- 2015 cabinet reshuffle
- 2017 cabinet reshuffle
