= 2020 cabinet reshuffle =

2020 cabinet reshuffle may refer to:

- 2020 British cabinet reshuffle
- 2020 Hong Kong cabinet reshuffle
- 2020 Indonesian cabinet reshuffle
- 2020 Kuwaiti cabinet reshuffle
- 2020 Pakistani cabinet reshuffle
- 2020 Scottish cabinet reshuffle

== See also ==
- 2019 cabinet reshuffle (disambiguation)
- 2021 cabinet reshuffle (disambiguation)
