= 2014 cabinet reshuffle =

2014 cabinet reshuffle may refer to:

- 2014 Australian cabinet reshuffle
- 2014 British cabinet reshuffle
- 2014 Japanese cabinet reshuffle
- 2014 Malaysian cabinet reshuffle
- 2014 Papua New Guinean cabinet reshuffle
- 2014 Singaporean cabinet reshuffle
- 2014 Welsh cabinet reshuffle

== See also ==
- 2013 cabinet reshuffle
- 2015 cabinet reshuffle
