= 2021 cabinet reshuffle =

2021 cabinet reshuffle may refer to:

- 2021 British cabinet reshuffle
- 2021 British shadow cabinet reshuffle (disambiguation)
  - May 2021 British shadow cabinet reshuffle
  - November 2021 British shadow cabinet reshuffle
- 2021 Canadian cabinet reshuffle
- 2021 Hong Kong cabinet reshuffle
- 2021 Indian cabinet reshuffle
- 2021 Indonesian cabinet reshuffle
- 2021 Pakistani cabinet reshuffle
- 2021 Singaporean cabinet reshuffle
- 2021 South African cabinet reshuffle

== See also ==
- 2020 cabinet reshuffle (disambiguation)
- 2022 cabinet reshuffle (disambiguation)
