= 2009 cabinet reshuffle =

2009 cabinet reshuffle may refer to:

- 2009 British cabinet reshuffle
- 2009 Singaporean cabinet reshuffle
- 2009 Tongan cabinet reshuffle

== See also ==
- 2008 cabinet reshuffle
- 2010 cabinet reshuffle
