= Second Gillard ministry =

66th ministry of government of Australia

- 66th ministry of Australia

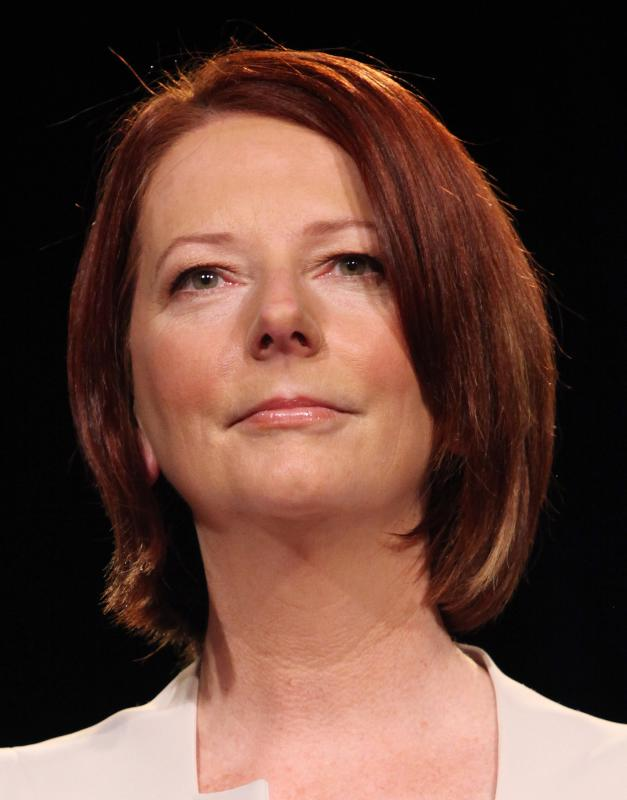
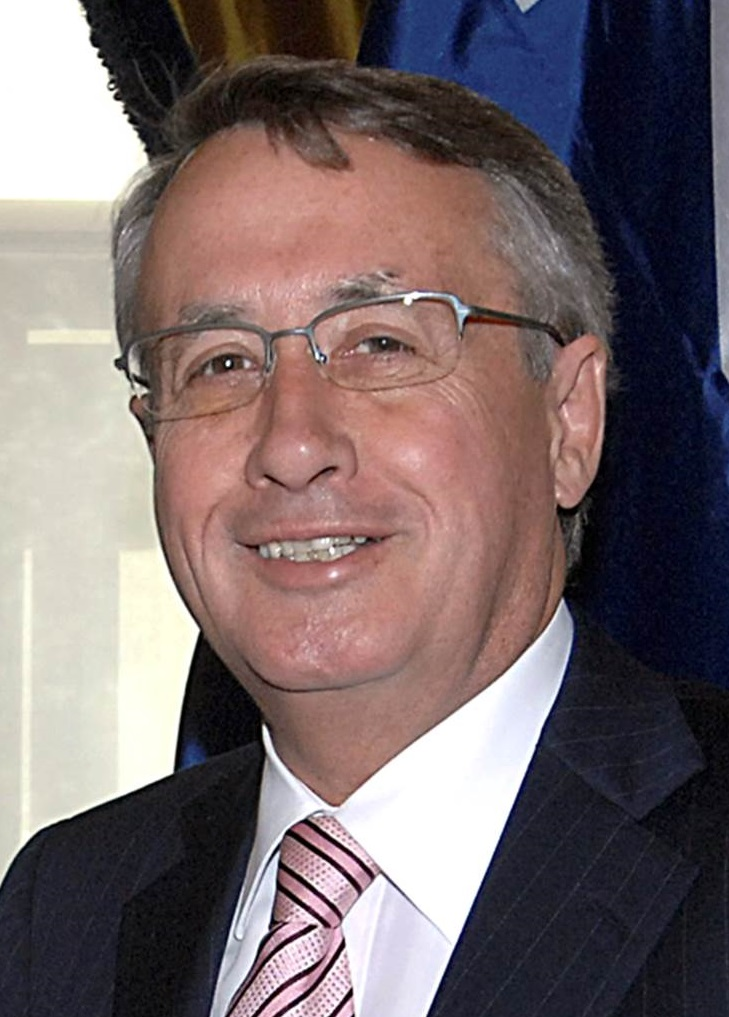
- Julia Gillard Wayne Swan
- Date formed: 14 September 2010
- Date dissolved: 27 June 2013

People and organisations
- Monarch: Elizabeth II
- Governor-General: Quentin Bryce
- Prime Minister: Julia Gillard
- Deputy Prime Minister: Wayne Swan
- Member party: Labor
- Status in legislature: Minority government
- Opposition cabinet: Abbott
- Opposition party: Liberal/National Coalition
- Opposition leader: Tony Abbott

History
- Election: 21 August 2010
- Legislature term: 43rd
- Budgets: 2011, 2012, 2013
- Predecessor: First Gillard ministry
- Successor: Second Rudd ministry

The Second Gillard ministry (Labor) was the 66th ministry of the Australian Government, led by Prime Minister Julia Gillard. It succeeded the first Gillard ministry upon its swearing in by Governor-General Quentin Bryce on 14 September 2010 after the 2010 election.

The members of the ministry were announced on 11 September 2010. It included some major changes from the first ministry, which had in essence been left over from the first Rudd ministry which preceded it.

A reconstitution of the ministry took place on 14 December 2011, with several key portfolios changing hands and other portfolios being redefined. Further changes were made on 5 March 2012 following the resignation of and unsuccessful leadership challenge by the Minister for Foreign Affairs, Kevin Rudd. Gillard implemented a further major reshuffle on 25 March 2013 following an abortive challenge from Rudd and his supporters.

On 26 June 2013, former prime minister Kevin Rudd was once again elected Labor Party leader. Gillard resigned as prime minister with effect from 27 June 2013, and the second Rudd ministry was formed.

== Original ministry ==
The following ministers served in the roles indicated from 14 September 2010 until 14 December 2011.

=== Cabinet ===
Officeholder	Office(s)
Julia Gillard MP	Prime Minister
Wayne Swan MP	Deputy Prime Minister; Treasurer
Senator Chris Evans	Minister for Tertiary Education, Skills, Jobs and Workplace Relations; Leader of the Government in the Senate
Senator Stephen Conroy	Minister for Broadband, Communications and the Digital Economy; Minister assisting the Prime Minister on Digital Productivity; Deputy Leader of the Government in the Senate
Simon Crean MP	Minister for Regional Australia, Regional Development and Local Government; Minister for the Arts
Kevin Rudd MP	Minister for Foreign Affairs
Stephen Smith MP	Minister for Defence; Deputy Leader of the House
Chris Bowen MP	Minister for Immigration and Citizenship
Anthony Albanese MP	Minister for Infrastructure and Transport; Leader of the House
Nicola Roxon MP	Minister for Health and Ageing
Jenny Macklin MP	Minister for Families, Community Services and Indigenous Affairs
Tony Burke MP	Minister for Sustainability, Environment, Water, Population and Communities
Senator Penny Wong	Minister for Finance and Deregulation
Peter Garrett MP	Minister for School Education, Early Childhood and Youth
Senator Kim Carr	Minister for Innovation, Industry, Science and Research
Robert McClelland MP	Attorney-General; Vice-President of the Executive Council
Senator Joe Ludwig	Minister for Agriculture, Fisheries and Forestry; Minister Assisting the Attorney-General on Queensland Floods Recovery (from 26 January 2011); Manager of Government Business in the Senate
Martin Ferguson MP	Minister for Resources and Energy; Minister for Tourism
Dr Craig Emerson MP	Minister for Trade
Greg Combet MP	Minister for Climate Change and Energy Efficiency

=== Outer ministry ===
Officeholder	Office(s)
Tanya Plibersek MP	Minister for Human Services; Minister for Social Inclusion
Brendan O'Connor MP	Minister for Home Affairs; Minister for Justice; Minister for Privacy and Freedom of Information
Kate Ellis MP	Minister for Employment Participation and Childcare; Minister for the Status of Women
Senator Mark Arbib	Minister for Indigenous Employment and Economic Development; Minister for Sport; Minister for Social Housing and Homelessness
Senator Nick Sherry	Minister for Small Business; Minister Assisting on Deregulation and Public Sector Superannuation; Minister assisting the Minister for Tourism
Warren Snowdon MP	Minister for Veterans' Affairs; Minister for Defence Science and Personnel; Minister for Indigenous Health; Minister Assisting the Prime Minister on the Centenary of ANZAC (from 3 March 2011)
Bill Shorten MP	Assistant Treasurer; Minister for Financial Services and Superannuation
Mark Butler MP	Minister for Mental Health and Ageing
Gary Gray MP	Special Minister of State; Special Minister of State for the Public Service and Integrity
Jason Clare MP	Minister for Defence Materiel

=== Parliamentary secretaries ===
Officeholder	Office(s)
Justine Elliot MP	Parliamentary Secretary for Trade
Mike Kelly MP	Parliamentary Secretary for Agriculture, Fisheries and Forestry
Richard Marles MP	Parliamentary Secretary for Pacific Island Affairs
Senator Jan McLucas	Parliamentary Secretary for Disabilities and Carers
David Bradbury MP	Parliamentary Secretary to the Treasurer
Senator Jacinta Collins	Parliamentary Secretary for School Education and Workplace Relations
Julie Collins MP	Parliamentary Secretary for Community Services
Mark Dreyfus MP	Parliamentary Secretary for Climate Change and Energy Efficiency; Cabinet Secretary
Catherine King MP	Parliamentary Secretary for Health and Ageing; Parliamentary Secretary for Infrastructure and Transport
Senator Kate Lundy	Parliamentary Secretary for Immigration and Citizenship; Parliamentary Secretary to the Prime Minister
Senator Don Farrell	Parliamentary Secretary for Sustainability and Urban Water
Senator David Feeney	Parliamentary Secretary for Defence

== December 2011 to March 2012 ==
The following ministers held office from 14 December 2011 to 5 March 2012. Tanya Plibersek was promoted to the cabinet and was appointed Minister for Health, whilst Nicola Roxon moved from Health to become Attorney-General. The cabinet grew to include Bill Shorten (who took Employment and Workplace Relations from Chris Evans) and Mark Butler, while Kim Carr was demoted to the outer ministry. Nick Sherry left the outer ministry, while Julie Collins and David Bradbury were promoted from parliamentary secretary into the outer cabinet, and Sid Sidebottom was appointed as a parliamentary secretary.

Kevin Rudd left the ministry the day before the February 2012 leadership spill, in which he was defeated by Gillard. Craig Emerson was subsequently named acting Foreign Minister.

=== Cabinet ===
Officeholder	Office(s)
Julia Gillard MP	Prime Minister
Wayne Swan MP	Deputy Prime Minister; Treasurer
Senator Chris Evans	Minister for Tertiary Education, Skills, Science and Research; Leader of the Government in the Senate
Senator Stephen Conroy	Minister for Broadband, Communications and the Digital Economy; Minister assisting the Prime Minister on Digital Productivity; Deputy Leader of the Government in the Senate
Simon Crean MP	Minister for Regional Australia, Regional Development and Local Government; Minister for the Arts
Kevin Rudd MP (until 26 February 2012)	Minister for Foreign Affairs
Stephen Smith MP	Minister for Defence; Deputy Leader of the House
Chris Bowen MP	Minister for Immigration and Citizenship
Anthony Albanese MP	Minister for Infrastructure and Transport; Leader of the House
Nicola Roxon MP	Attorney-General
Jenny Macklin MP	Minister for Families, Community Services and Indigenous Affairs; Minister for Disability Reform
Tony Burke MP	Minister for Sustainability, Environment, Water, Population and Communities
Senator Penny Wong	Minister for Finance and Deregulation
Peter Garrett MP	Minister for School Education, Early Childhood and Youth
Robert McClelland MP	Minister for Housing; Minister for Homelessness; Minister for Emergency Management; Vice-President of the Executive Council
Senator Joe Ludwig	Minister for Agriculture, Fisheries and Forestry; Minister Assisting the Attorney-General on Queensland Floods Recovery
Martin Ferguson MP	Minister for Resources and Energy; Minister for Tourism
Dr Craig Emerson MP	Minister for Trade
Greg Combet MP	Minister for Climate Change and Energy Efficiency; Minister for Industry and Innovation
Tanya Plibersek MP	Minister for Health
Bill Shorten MP	Minister for Employment and Workplace Relations; Minister for Financial Services and Superannuation
Mark Butler MP	Minister for Mental Health and Ageing; Minister for Social Inclusion; Minister Assisting the Prime Minister on Mental Health Reform

=== Outer ministry ===
Officeholder	Office(s)
Brendan O'Connor MP	Minister for Human Services; Minister Assisting the Minister for School Education
Senator Kim Carr	Minister for Manufacturing; Minister for Defence Materiel
Senator Mark Arbib	Assistant Treasurer; Minister for Small Business; Minister for Sport; Manager of Government Business in the Senate
Kate Ellis MP	Minister for Employment Participation; Minister for Early Childhood and Childcare
Warren Snowdon MP	Minister for Veterans' Affairs; Minister for Defence Science and Personnel; Minister for Indigenous Health; Minister Assisting the Prime Minister on the Centenary of ANZAC
Gary Gray MP	Special Minister of State; Minister for the Public Service and Integrity
Jason Clare MP	Minister for Home Affairs; Minister for Justice
Julie Collins MP	Minister for Community Services; Minister for Indigenous Employment and Economic Development; Minister for the Status of Women

=== Parliamentary secretaries ===
Officeholder	Office(s)
Justine Elliot MP	Parliamentary Secretary for Trade
Mike Kelly MP	Parliamentary Secretary for Defence
Richard Marles MP	Parliamentary Secretary for Pacific Island Affairs
Senator Jan McLucas	Parliamentary Secretary for Disabilities and Carers
David Bradbury MP	Parliamentary Secretary to the Treasurer
Senator Jacinta Collins	Parliamentary Secretary for School Education and Workplace Relations
Mark Dreyfus MP	Parliamentary Secretary for Climate Change and Energy Efficiency; Parliamentary Secretary for Industry and Innovation; Cabinet Secretary
Senator Don Farrell	Parliamentary Secretary for Sustainability and Urban Water
Senator David Feeney	Parliamentary Secretary for Defence
Catherine King MP	Parliamentary Secretary for Health and Ageing; Parliamentary Secretary for Infrastructure and Transport
Senator Kate Lundy	Parliamentary Secretary to the Prime Minister; Parliamentary Secretary for Immigration and Multicultural Affairs
Sid Sidebottom MP	Parliamentary Secretary for Agriculture, Fisheries and Forestry

== March 2012 to February 2013 ==
The following ministers held office from 5 March 2012 to 4 February 2013. A reshuffle was conducted to replace Kevin Rudd, Mark Arbib and Robert McClelland, who all left the ministry due to the February 2012 leadership spill. Bob Carr was named Foreign Minister, though his appointment was delayed until he took his seat in the Senate on 13 March. Craig Emerson continued to act as Foreign Minister until Carr took up the post. Nicola Roxon added the Emergency Management portfolio to her existing one, and Tony Burke likewise became Vice-President of the Executive Council. Brendan O'Connor was promoted to cabinet as Minister for Small Business, for Housing, and for Homelessness. Kate Lundy and David Bradbury were promoted to the outer ministry, and Bernie Ripoll and Sharon Bird were appointed parliamentary secretaries.

=== Cabinet ===
Officeholder	Office(s)
Julia Gillard MP	Prime Minister
Wayne Swan MP	Deputy Prime Minister; Treasurer
Senator Chris Evans	Minister for Tertiary Education, Skills, Science and Research; Leader of the Government in the Senate
Senator Stephen Conroy	Minister for Broadband, Communications and the Digital Economy; Minister assisting the Prime Minister on Digital Productivity; Deputy Leader of the Government in the Senate
Simon Crean MP	Minister for Regional Australia, Regional Development and Local Government; Minister for the Arts
Senator Bob Carr (from 13 March 2012)	Minister for Foreign Affairs
Stephen Smith MP	Minister for Defence; Deputy Leader of the House
Chris Bowen MP	Minister for Immigration and Citizenship
Anthony Albanese MP	Minister for Infrastructure and Transport; Leader of the House
Nicola Roxon MP	Attorney-General; Minister for Emergency Management
Jenny Macklin MP	Minister for Families, Community Services and Indigenous Affairs; Minister for Disability Reform
Tony Burke MP	Minister for Sustainability, Environment, Water, Population and Communities; Vice-President of the Executive Council
Senator Penny Wong	Minister for Finance and Deregulation
Peter Garrett MP	Minister for School Education, Early Childhood and Youth
Senator Joe Ludwig	Minister for Agriculture, Fisheries and Forestry; Minister Assisting the Attorney-General on Queensland Floods Recovery
Martin Ferguson MP	Minister for Resources and Energy; Minister for Tourism
Dr Craig Emerson MP	Minister for Trade and Competitiveness
Greg Combet MP	Minister for Climate Change and Energy Efficiency; Minister for Industry and Innovation
Tanya Plibersek MP	Minister for Health
Bill Shorten MP	Minister for Employment and Workplace Relations; Minister for Financial Services and Superannuation
Mark Butler MP	Minister for Mental Health and Ageing; Minister for Social Inclusion; Minister Assisting the Prime Minister on Mental Health Reform
Brendan O'Connor MP	Minister for Small Business; Minister for Housing; Minister for Homelessness

=== Outer ministry ===
Officeholder	Office(s)
Senator Kim Carr	Minister for Human Services
Kate Ellis MP	Minister for Employment Participation; Minister for Early Childhood and Childcare
Warren Snowdon MP	Minister for Veterans' Affairs; Minister for Defence Science and Personnel; Minister for Indigenous Health; Minister Assisting the Prime Minister on the Centenary of ANZAC
Gary Gray MP	Special Minister of State; Minister for the Public Service and Integrity
Jason Clare MP	Minister for Home Affairs; Minister for Justice; Minister for Defence Materiel
Julie Collins MP	Minister for Community Services; Minister for Indigenous Employment and Economic Development; Minister for the Status of Women
Senator Kate Lundy	Minister for Sport; Minister for Multicultural Affairs; Minister Assisting the Minister for Industry and Innovation
David Bradbury MP	Assistant Treasurer; Minister Assisting for Deregulation

=== Parliamentary secretaries ===
Officeholder	Office(s)
Justine Elliot MP	Parliamentary Secretary for Trade
Mike Kelly MP	Parliamentary Secretary for Defence
Richard Marles MP	Parliamentary Secretary for Pacific Island Affairs; Parliamentary Secretary for Foreign Affairs
Senator Jan McLucas	Parliamentary Secretary for Disabilities and Carers; Parliamentary Secretary to the Prime Minister
Senator Jacinta Collins	Parliamentary Secretary for School Education and Workplace Relations; Manager of Government Business in the Senate
Mark Dreyfus MP	Parliamentary Secretary for Climate Change and Energy Efficiency; Parliamentary Secretary for Industry and Innovation; Cabinet Secretary
Senator Don Farrell	Parliamentary Secretary for Sustainability and Urban Water
Senator David Feeney	Parliamentary Secretary for Defence
Catherine King MP	Parliamentary Secretary for Health and Ageing; Parliamentary Secretary for Infrastructure and Transport
Sid Sidebottom MP	Parliamentary Secretary for Agriculture, Fisheries and Forestry
Bernie Ripoll MP	Parliamentary Secretary to the Treasurer
Sharon Bird MP	Parliamentary Secretary for Higher Education and Skills

== February 2013 to March 2013 ==
The following ministers held office from 4 February 2013. The reshuffle occurred after the resignation from Cabinet of Attorney-General Nicola Roxon and Senator Chris Evans, Leader of the Government in the Senate and Minister for Tertiary Education, Skills, Science and Research.

As a result of a failed attempt to reinstall Kevin Rudd as Prime Minister in March 2013, Simon Crean was sacked as a minister. Cabinet ministers Chris Bowen and Martin Ferguson, minister Kim Carr, and parliamentary secretary Richard Marles resigned their positions. On 25 March 2013, Prime Minister Gillard announced a reconstituted Cabinet and Ministry.

=== Cabinet ===
Officeholder	Office(s)
Julia Gillard MP	Prime Minister
Wayne Swan MP	Deputy Prime Minister; Treasurer
Senator Stephen Conroy	Minister for Broadband, Communications and the Digital Economy; Minister assisting the Prime Minister on Digital Productivity; Leader of the Government in the Senate
Senator Penny Wong	Minister for Finance and Deregulation; Deputy Leader of the Government in the Senate
Simon Crean MP	Minister for Regional Australia, Regional Development and Local Government; Minister for the Arts
Stephen Smith MP	Minister for Defence; Deputy Leader of the House
Chris Bowen MP	Minister for Tertiary Education, Skills, Science and Research; Minister for Small Business
Anthony Albanese MP	Minister for Infrastructure and Transport; Leader of the House
Jenny Macklin MP	Minister for Families, Community Services and Indigenous Affairs; Minister for Disability Reform
Senator Bob Carr	Minister for Foreign Affairs
Tony Burke MP	Minister for Sustainability, Environment, Water, Population and Communities; Vice-President of the Executive Council
Peter Garrett MP	Minister for School Education, Early Childhood and Youth
Senator Joe Ludwig	Minister for Agriculture, Fisheries and Forestry; Minister Assisting the Attorney-General on Queensland Floods Recovery
Martin Ferguson MP	Minister for Resources and Energy; Minister for Tourism
Dr Craig Emerson MP	Minister for Trade and Competitiveness; Minister Assisting the Prime Minister on Asian Century Policy
Greg Combet MP	Minister for Climate Change and Energy Efficiency; Minister for Industry and Innovation
Tanya Plibersek MP	Minister for Health
Bill Shorten MP	Minister for Employment and Workplace Relations; Minister for Financial Services and Superannuation
Mark Butler MP	Minister for Mental Health and Ageing; Minister for Social Inclusion; Minister for Housing and Homelessness; Minister Assisting the Prime Minister on Mental Health Reform
Brendan O'Connor MP	Minister for Immigration and Citizenship
Mark Dreyfus MP	Attorney-General; Minister for Emergency Management

=== Outer ministry ===
Officeholder	Office(s)
Senator Kim Carr	Minister for Human Services
Kate Ellis MP	Minister for Early Childhood and Childcare; Minister for Employment Participation
Warren Snowdon MP	Minister for Veterans' Affairs; Minister for Defence Science and Personnel; Minister for Indigenous Health; Minister Assisting the Prime Minister on the Centenary of ANZAC
Gary Gray MP	Special Minister of State; Minister for the Public Service and Integrity
Jason Clare MP	Minister for Home Affairs; Minister for Justice; Cabinet Secretary
Julie Collins MP	Minister for Community Services; Minister for Indigenous Employment and Economic Development; Minister for the Status of Women
David Bradbury MP	Assistant Treasurer; Minister Assisting for Deregulation
Senator Kate Lundy	Minister for Sport; Minister for Multicultural Affairs; Minister Assisting the Minister for Industry and Innovation
Mike Kelly MP	Minister for Defence Materiel

=== Parliamentary secretaries ===
Officeholder	Office(s)
Kelvin Thomson MP	Parliamentary Secretary for Trade
Richard Marles MP	Parliamentary Secretary for Pacific Island Affairs; Parliamentary Secretary for Foreign Affairs
Senator Jan McLucas	Parliamentary Secretary for Disabilities and Carers; Parliamentary Secretary to the Prime Minister
Senator Jacinta Collins	Parliamentary Secretary for School Education and Workplace Relations; Manager of Government Business in the Senate
Senator Don Farrell	Parliamentary Secretary for Sustainability and Urban Water
Senator David Feeney	Parliamentary Secretary for Defence
Catherine King MP	Parliamentary Secretary for Health and Ageing; Parliamentary Secretary for Infrastructure and Transport
Sid Sidebottom MP	Parliamentary Secretary for Agriculture, Fisheries and Forestry
Bernie Ripoll MP	Parliamentary Secretary to the Treasurer
Sharon Bird MP	Parliamentary Secretary for Higher Education and Skills
Yvette D'Ath MP	Parliamentary Secretary for Climate Change and Energy Efficiency
Melissa Parke MP	Parliamentary Secretary for Mental Health, Homelessness and Social Housing

== March 2013 to June 2013 ==
The following Ministers held office from 25 March 2013 until the end of the Ministry in June 2013.

=== Cabinet ===
Officeholder	Office(s)
Julia Gillard MP	Prime Minister
Wayne Swan MP	Deputy Prime Minister; Treasurer
Senator Stephen Conroy	Minister for Broadband, Communications and the Digital Economy; Minister assisting the Prime Minister on Digital Productivity; Leader of the Government in the Senate
Senator Penny Wong	Minister for Finance and Deregulation; Deputy Leader of the Government in the Senate
Stephen Smith MP	Minister for Defence; Deputy Leader of the House
Anthony Albanese MP	Minister for Infrastructure and Transport; Minister for Regional Development and Local Government; Leader of the House
Jenny Macklin MP	Minister for Families, Community Services and Indigenous Affairs; Minister for Disability Reform
Senator Bob Carr	Minister for Foreign Affairs
Tony Burke MP	Minister for Sustainability, Environment, Water, Population and Communities; Minister for Arts; Vice-President of the Executive Council
Peter Garrett MP	Minister for School Education, Early Childhood and Youth
Senator Joe Ludwig	Minister for Agriculture, Fisheries and Forestry; Minister Assisting the Attorney-General on Queensland Floods Recovery
Dr Craig Emerson MP	Minister for Trade and Competitiveness; Minister for Tertiary Education, Skills, Science and Research; Minister Assisting the Prime Minister on Asian Century Policy
Greg Combet MP	Minister for Climate Change, Industry and Innovation
Tanya Plibersek MP	Minister for Health
Bill Shorten MP	Minister for Employment and Workplace Relations; Minister for Financial Services and Superannuation
Mark Butler MP	Minister for Mental Health and Ageing; Minister for Social Inclusion; Minister for Housing and Homelessness; Minister Assisting the Prime Minister on Mental Health Reform
Brendan O'Connor MP	Minister for Immigration and Citizenship
Mark Dreyfus MP	Attorney-General; Minister for Emergency Management; Special Minister for State; Minister for the Public Service and Integrity
Gary Gray MP	Minister for Resources and Energy; Minister for Tourism; Minister for Small Business
Jason Clare MP	Minister for Home Affairs; Minister for Justice; Cabinet Secretary

=== Outer ministry ===
Officeholder	Office(s)
Senator Jan McLucas	Minister for Human Services
Kate Ellis MP	Minister for Early Childhood and Childcare; Minister for Employment Participation
Warren Snowdon MP	Minister for Veterans' Affairs; Minister for Defence Science and Personnel; Minister for Indigenous Health; Minister Assisting the Prime Minister on the Centenary of ANZAC
Julie Collins MP	Minister for Community Services; Minister for Indigenous Employment and Economic Development; Minister for the Status of Women
David Bradbury MP	Assistant Treasurer; Minister Assisting for Deregulation
Senator Kate Lundy	Minister for Sport; Minister for Multicultural Affairs; Minister Assisting for Industry and Innovation
Mike Kelly MP	Minister for Defence Materiel
Senator Don Farrell	Minister for Science and Research; Minister Assisting for Tourism
Sharon Bird MP	Minister for Higher Education and Skills
Catherine King MP	Minister for Regional Services, Local Communities and Territories; Minister for Road Safety

=== Parliamentary secretaries ===
Officeholde	Office(s)
Kelvin Thomson MP	Parliamentary Secretary for Trade
Senator Jacinta Collins	Parliamentary Secretary for School Education and Workplace Relations; Manager of Government Business in the Senate
Senator David Feeney	Parliamentary Secretary for Defence
Sid Sidebottom MP	Parliamentary Secretary for Agriculture, Fisheries and Forestry
Bernie Ripoll MP	Parliamentary Secretary to the Treasurer; Parliamentary Secretary for Small Business
Yvette D'Ath MP	Parliamentary Secretary for Climate Change, Industry and Innovation
Melissa Parke MP	Parliamentary Secretary for Mental Health, Homelessness and Social Housing
Michael Danby MP	Parliamentary Secretary for the Arts
Andrew Leigh MP	Parliamentary Secretary to the Prime Minister
Senator Matt Thistlethwaite	Parliamentary Secretary for Pacific Island Affairs; Parliamentary Secretary for Multicultural Affairs
Amanda Rishworth MP	Parliamentary Secretary for Sustainability and Urban Water; Parliamentary Secretary for Disabilities and Carers
Shayne Neumann MP	Parliamentary Secretary to the Attorney-General; Parliamentary Secretary for Health and Ageing

== See also ==
- First Gillard ministry
