= Abbott shadow ministry =

Shadow ministry of Australia (2009–2013)

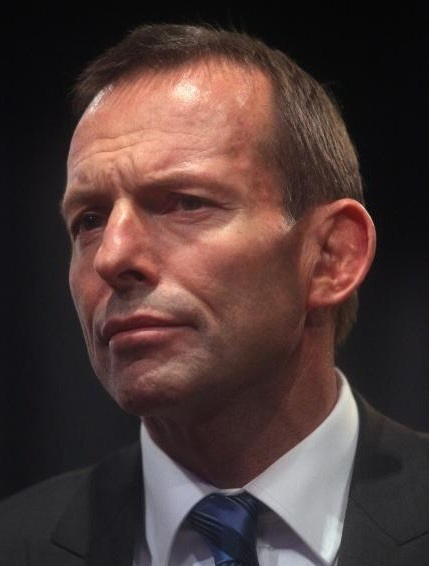
Tony Abbott in 2010

The Shadow Ministry of Tony Abbott was the opposition Coalition shadow ministry of Australia from December 2009 to September 2013, opposing the Australian Labor Party governments of Kevin Rudd and Julia Gillard.

The shadow ministry is a group of senior Opposition spokespeople who form an alternative Cabinet to the government's, whose members shadow or mark each individual Minister or portfolio of the Government.

Since the 2007 federal election, the Liberal–National Coalition had been the Official Opposition, initially led by Brendan Nelson and later Malcolm Turnbull. In 2009, Tony Abbott defeated Turnbull in a leadership spill 42 votes to 41 in the second round and took on the role of Opposition Leader.

The Abbott shadow ministry was the first in which shadow ministers received additional pay for their roles, taking effect from 2012 after a decision of the Gillard government.

== Structure ==
The "opposition front bench" comprises the full shadow ministry including the shadow cabinet, other shadow ministers and shadow parliamentary secretaries. As an institution, the shadow cabinet is much less defined—or studied—than the Cabinet with its well established formal procedures. Shadow Cabinet operates more as a committee of an opposition political party than an institution of Government or Parliament. The Cabinet Handbook was first published in 1926 and the updated version is available on-line but no such equivalent exists for Shadow Cabinet.

== First arrangement (2009–2010) ==
The Shadow Cabinet of Tony Abbott was created following the accession of Tony Abbott to the leadership in December 2009. It remained largely unchanged until the 2010 election, excluding one minor reshuffle in March 2010. After this reshuffle, Barnaby Joyce gained the Regional Development portfolio from Warren Truss and the Infrastructure and Water Portfolio from Ian Macfarlane. Andrew Robb took on Joyce's previous portfolio of Finance and Deregulation and Macfarlane gained the Energy and Resources portfolio from the retiring Nick Minchin.

Colour key
(for political parties)
Liberal
National

=== Shadow Cabinet ===
Shadow Minister	Portfolio
Tony Abbott MP	Leader of the Opposition
Julie Bishop MP	Deputy Leader of the Opposition; Shadow Minister for Foreign Affairs
Warren Truss MP	Leader of the Nationals; Shadow Minister for Trade, Transport, Regional Development and Local Government (To 25 March 2010); Shadow Minister for Trade, Transport and Local Government (From 25 March 2010)
Senator Nick Minchin	Leader of the Opposition in the Senate (To 3 May 2010); Shadow Minister for Resources and Energy (To 25 March 2010)
Senator Eric Abetz	Shadow Minister for Employment and Workplace Relations; Deputy Leader of the Opposition in the Senate (To 3 May 2010); Leader of the Opposition in the Senate (From 3 May 2010)
Joe Hockey MP	Shadow Treasurer
Christopher Pyne MP	Manager of Opposition Business in the House; Shadow Minister for Education, Apprenticeships and Training
Ian Macfarlane MP	Shadow Minister for Infrastructure and Water (To 25 March 2010); Shadow Minister for Energy and Resources (From 25 March 2010)
Senator George Brandis SC	Shadow Attorney-General
Senator David Johnston	Shadow Minister for Defence
Peter Dutton MP	Shadow Minister for Health and Ageing
Kevin Andrews MP	Shadow Minister for Families, Housing and Human Services
Greg Hunt MP	Shadow Minister for Climate Action, Environment and Heritage
Senator Nigel Scullion	Deputy Leader of the Nationals; Shadow Minister for Indigenous Affairs
Senator Barnaby Joyce	Leader of The Nationals in the Senate; Shadow Minister for Finance and Debt Reduction (To 25 March 2010); Shadow Minister for Regional Development, Infrastructure and Water (From 25 March 2010)
John Cobb MP	Shadow Minister for Agriculture, Food Security, Fisheries and Forestry
Bruce Billson MP	Shadow Minister for Small Business, Deregulation, Competition Policy and Sustainable Cities
Tony Smith MP	Shadow Minister for Broadband, Communications and the Digital Economy
Scott Morrison MP	Shadow Minister for Immigration and Citizenship
Sophie Mirabella MP	Shadow Minister for Innovation, Industry, Science and Research
Andrew Robb AO MP	Chairman of the Coalition Policy Development Committee; Shadow Minister for Finance and Debt Reduction (From 25 March 2010)
Philip Ruddock MP	Shadow Cabinet Secretary

=== Members of the Outer Shadow Ministry ===
Shadow Minister	Portfolio
Bronwyn Bishop MP	Shadow Minister for Seniors
Senator Michael Ronaldson	Shadow Special Minister of State and Scrutiny of Government Waste
Sharman Stone MP	Shadow Minister for Early Childhood Education and Childcare; Shadow Minister for the Status of Women
Steven Ciobo MP	Shadow Minister for Tourism and the Arts; Shadow Minister for Youth and Sport
Michael Keenan MP	Shadow Minister for Justice and Customs
Sussan Ley MP	Shadow Assistant Treasurer
Bob Baldwin MP	Shadow Minister for Defence Science and Personnel; Shadow Minister Assisting the Shadow Minister for Defence
Luke Hartsuyker MP	Deputy Manager of Opposition Business in the House; Shadow Minister for Consumer Affairs, Financial Services, Superannuation and Corporate Law
Louise Markus MP	Shadow Minister for Veterans' Affairs
Senator Concetta Fierravanti-Wells	Shadow Minister for Ageing
Senator Marise Payne	Shadow Minister for COAG and Modernising the Federation
Senator Mathias Cormann	Shadow Minister for Employment Participation, Apprenticeships and Training

=== Shadow Parliamentary Secretaries ===
Shadow Minister	Portfolio
Senator Ian Macdonald	Shadow Parliamentary Secretary for Northern and Remote Australia
Andrew Southcott MP	Shadow Parliamentary Secretary for Regional Health Services, Health and Wellbeing
Senator Brett Mason	Shadow Parliamentary Secretary for Education and School Curriculum Standards; Shadow Parliamentary Secretary for Innovation, Industry, Science and Research
Senator Mitch Fifield	Shadow Parliamentary Secretary for Disabilities, Carers and the Voluntary Sector
Senator Richard Colbeck	Shadow Parliamentary Secretary for Agriculture, Fisheries and Forestry
Senator Cory Bernardi	Shadow Parliamentary Secretary Assisting the Leader of the Opposition; Shadow Parliamentary Secretary for Infrastructure and Population Policy
Don Randall MP	Shadow Parliamentary Secretary for Roads and Transport
Senator Simon Birmingham	Shadow Parliamentary Secretary for the Murray Darling Basin
Stuart Robert MP	Shadow Parliamentary Secretary for Defence
Senator Gary Humphries	Shadow Parliamentary Secretary for Families, Housing and Human Services; Shadow Parliamentary Secretary for Citizenship
Joanna Gash MP	Shadow Parliamentary Secretary for Tourism
Jason Wood MP	Shadow Parliamentary Secretary for Public Security and Policing
Mark Coulton MP	Shadow Parliamentary Secretary for Regional Development and Emerging Trade Markets
Senator Guy Barnett	Chairman of the Scrutiny of Government Waste Committee

== Second arrangement (2010–2013) ==
Tony Abbott reshuffled the Shadow Cabinet following the 2010 election and this arrangement remained largely unchanged until the election of the Abbott government in 2013. Two alterations were made during this period. In March 2011, Michael Ronaldson was appointed Shadow Minister Assisting the Leader of the Opposition on the Centenary of ANZAC. A wider redistribution took place in September 2012 following the resignation of Cory Bernardi. Arthur Sinodinos took on the role of Shadow Parliamentary Secretary Assisting the Leader of the Opposition and Jamie Briggs took on the role of Shadow Parliamentary Secretary of Supporting Families. Michaelia Cash was also appointed Deputy Manager of Opposition Business in the Senate.

Colour key
(for political parties)
Liberal
National

=== Shadow Cabinet ===
Shadow Minister	Portfolio
Tony Abbott MP	Leader of the Opposition
Julie Bishop MP	Deputy Leader of the Opposition; Shadow Minister for Foreign Affairs; Shadow Minister for Trade
Warren Truss MP	Leader of the Nationals; Shadow Minister for Infrastructure and Transport
Senator Eric Abetz	Leader of the Opposition in the Senate; Shadow Minister for Employment and Workplace Relations
Joe Hockey MP	Shadow Treasurer
Christopher Pyne MP	Manager of Opposition Business in the House; Shadow Minister for Education, Apprenticeships and Training
Ian Macfarlane MP	Shadow Minister for Energy and Resources
Senator George Brandis SC	Deputy Leader of the Opposition in the Senate; Shadow Minister for the Arts; Attorney-General
Senator David Johnston	Shadow Minister for Defence
Peter Dutton MP	Shadow Minister for Health and Ageing
Kevin Andrews MP	Shadow Minister for Families, Housing and Human Services
Greg Hunt MP	Shadow Minister for Climate Action, Environment and Heritage
Senator Nigel Scullion	Deputy Leader of the Nationals; Shadow Minister for Indigenous Affairs
Senator Barnaby Joyce	Leader of The Nationals in the Senate; Shadow Minister for Regional Development, Local Government and Water
John Cobb MP	Shadow Minister for Agriculture and Food Security
Bruce Billson MP	Shadow Minister for Small Business, Competition Policy and Consumer Affairs
Malcolm Turnbull MP	Shadow Minister for Communications and Broadband
Scott Morrison MP	Shadow Minister for Immigration and Citizenship; Shadow Minister for Productivity and Population
Sophie Mirabella MP	Shadow Minister for Innovation, Industry and Science
Andrew Robb AO MP	Shadow Minister for Finance, Deregulation and Debt Reduction; Chairman of the Coalition Policy Development Committee

=== Members of the Outer Shadow Ministry ===
Shadow Minister	Portfolio
Bronwyn Bishop MP	Shadow Special Minister of State; Shadow Minister for Seniors
Senator Michael Ronaldson	Shadow Minister for Veterans' Affairs; Shadow Minister Assisting the Leader of the Opposition on the Centenary of ANZAC (From 3 March 2011)
Stuart Robert MP	Shadow Minister for Defence Science, Technology and Personnel
Senator Mathias Cormann	Shadow Assistant Treasurer; Shadow Minister for Financial Services and Superannuation
Sussan Ley MP	Shadow Minister for Employment Participation; Shadow Minister for Childcare and Early Childhood Learning
Senator Marise Payne	Shadow Minister for Indigenous Development and Employment; Shadow Minister for COAG; Shadow Minister for Housing
Senator Brett Mason	Shadow Minister for Universities and Research
Luke Hartsuyker MP	Deputy Manager of Opposition Business in the House; Shadow Minister for Youth and Sport; Shadow Minister for Regional Communications
Michael Keenan MP	Shadow Minister for Justice, Customs and Border Protection
Bob Baldwin MP	Shadow Minister Regional Development; Shadow Minister for Tourism
Senator Concetta Fierravanti-Wells	Shadow Minister for Ageing; Shadow Minister for Mental Health
Senator Mitch Fifield	Manager of Opposition Business in the Senate; Shadow Minister for Disabilities, Carers and the Voluntary Sector

=== Shadow Parliamentary Secretaries (2009–2013) ===
Shadow Minister	Portfolio
Senator Ian Macdonald	Shadow Parliamentary Secretary for the Defence Force and Defence Support; Shadow Parliamentary Secretary for Northern and Remote Australia
Andrew Southcott MP	Shadow Parliamentary Secretary for Primary Healthcare
Senator Richard Colbeck	Shadow Parliamentary Secretary for Innovation, Industry and Science; Shadow Parliamentary Secretary for Fisheries and Forestry
Senator Cory Bernardi	Shadow Parliamentary Secretary Assisting the Leader of the Opposition (To 19 September 2012); Shadow Parliamentary Secretary for Supporting Families (To 19 September 2012)
Senator Arthur Sinodinos	Shadow Parliamentary Secretary Assisting the Leader of the Opposition (From 19 September 2012)
Darren Chester MP	Shadow Parliamentary Secretary for Roads and Regional Transport
Senator Simon Birmingham	Shadow Parliamentary Secretary for the Environment; Shadow Parliamentary Secretary for the Murray Darling Basin
Teresa Gambaro MP	Shadow Parliamentary Secretary for International Development Assistance; Shadow Parliamentary Secretary for Citizenship and Settlement
Senator Gary Humphries	Shadow Parliamentary Secretary to the Shadow Attorney-General; Shadow Parliamentary Secretary for Defence Materiel
Tony Smith MP	Shadow Parliamentary Secretary for Tax Reform; Deputy chairman, Coalition Policy Development Committee
Andrew Laming MP	Shadow Parliamentary Secretary for Regional Health Services and Indigenous Health
Senator Michaelia Cash	Shadow Parliamentary Secretary for the Status of Women; Shadow Parliamentary Secretary for Immigration; Deputy Manager of Opposition Business in the Senate (From 19 September 2012)
Senator Fiona Nash	Shadow Parliamentary Secretary for Regional Education
Don Randall MP	Shadow Parliamentary Secretary for Local Government
Senator Scott Ryan	Shadow Parliamentary Secretary for Small Business and Fair Competition
Jamie Briggs MP	Chairman of the Scrutiny of Government Waste Committee; Shadow Parliamentary Secretary for Supporting Families (From 19 September 2012)

== Other positions ==
Party	Shadow Minister	Portfolio
Liberal	Warren Entsch MP	Chief Opposition Whip in the House of Representatives
Liberal	Patrick Secker MP	Opposition Whip in House of Representatives:
Liberal	Nola Marino MP	Opposition Whip in House of Representatives:
Liberal	Senator Helen Kroger	Chief Opposition Whip in the Senate
Liberal	Senator David Bushby	Deputy Opposition Whip in the Senate
Liberal	Senator Chris Back	Deputy Opposition Whip in the Senate
National	Mark Coulton MP	Nationals Chief Whip in the House of Representatives
National	Paul Neville MP	Nationals Whip in the House of Representatives
National	Senator John Williams	Nationals Whip in the Senate

== See also ==
- First Rudd Ministry
- First Gillard Ministry
- Second Gillard Ministry
- Second Rudd Ministry
- Abbott Ministry
