= 2018 cabinet reshuffle =

2018 cabinet reshuffle may refer to:

- 2018 British cabinet reshuffle
- 2018 Canadian cabinet reshuffle
- 2018 Gambian cabinet reshuffle
- 2018 Indonesian cabinet reshuffle
- 2018 Jordanian cabinet reshuffle
- 2018 Kuwaiti cabinet reshuffle
- 2018 Namibian cabinet reshuffle
- 2018 Scottish cabinet reshuffle
- 2018 Singaporean cabinet reshuffle
- 2018 South African cabinet reshuffle

== See also ==
- 2017 cabinet reshuffle (disambiguation)
- 2019 cabinet reshuffle (disambiguation)
