= 2013 cabinet reshuffle =

2013 cabinet reshuffle may refer to:

- 2013 Danish cabinet reshuffle
- 2013 Egyptian cabinet reshuffle
- 2013 Jordanian cabinet reshuffle
- 2013 Serbian cabinet reshuffle
- 2013 Singaporean cabinet reshuffle
- 2013 Syrian cabinet reshuffle
- 2013 Turkish cabinet reshuffle
- 2013 Welsh cabinet reshuffle

== See also ==
- 2012 cabinet reshuffle
- 2014 cabinet reshuffle
