= 2021 British shadow cabinet reshuffle =

2021 British shadow cabinet reshuffle may refer to:

- May 2021 British shadow cabinet reshuffle
- November 2021 British shadow cabinet reshuffle

== See also ==
- 2021 cabinet reshuffle (disambiguation)
