= Minister for Disability and the National Disability Insurance Scheme =

Australian cabinet position

- Commonwealth Coat of Arms

- Flag of Australia

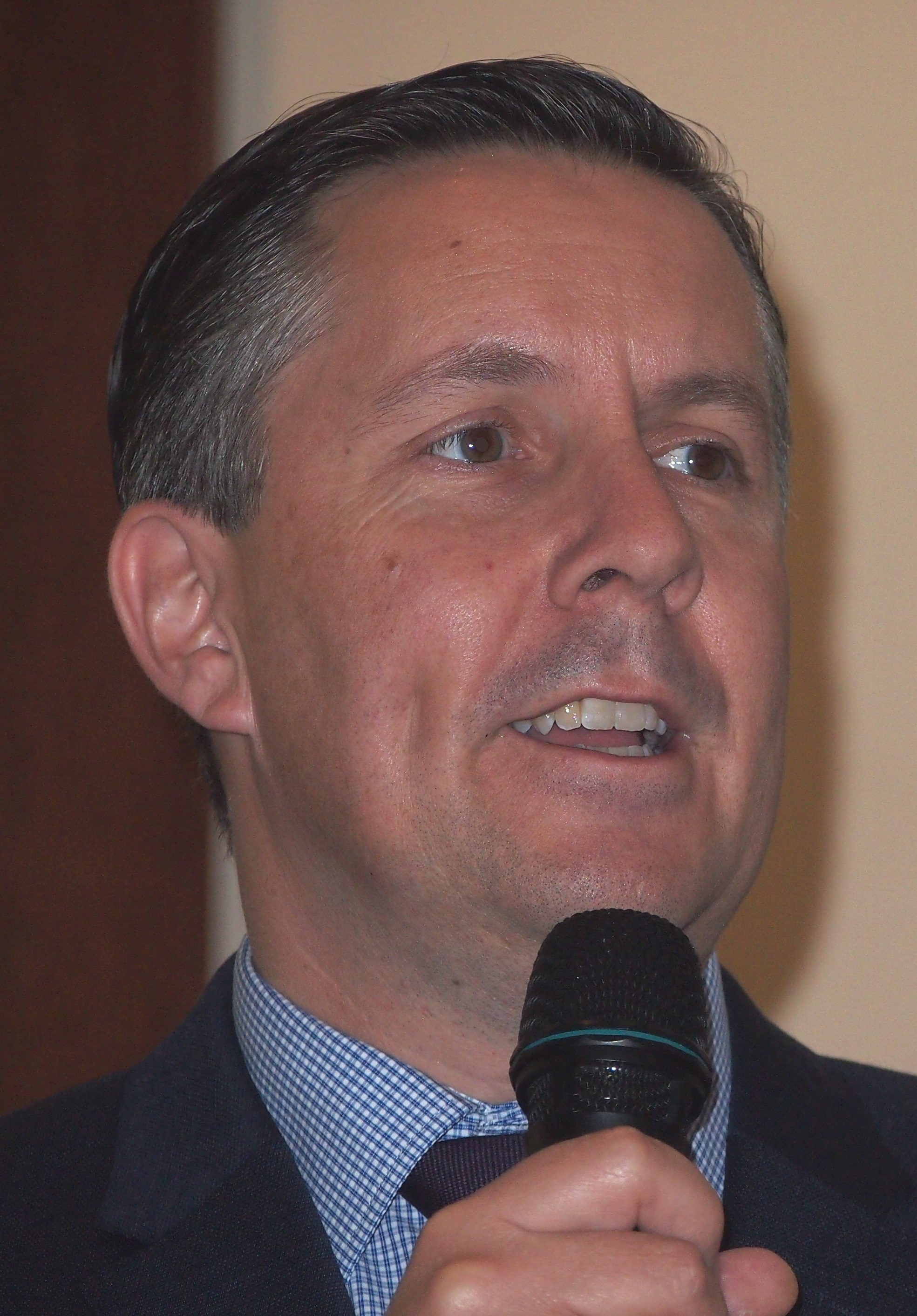
- Incumbent; Mark Butler since 13 May 2025
- Department of Health, Disability and Ageing
- Style: The Honourable
- Appointer: Governor-General on the advice of the prime minister
- Inaugural holder: Jenny Macklin (as Minister for Disability Reform)
- Formation: 14 December 2011
- Website: www.health.gov.au/ministers/the-hon-mark-butler-mp

The Minister for Disability and the National Disability Insurance Scheme is an Australian Government cabinet position which is currently held by Mark Butler following his swearing-in on 13 May 2025 as a result of Anthony Albanese's Labor government being re-elected at the 2025 Australian federal election.

In the Government of Australia, the minister administers this portfolio through the Department of Health, Disability and Ageing. The portfolio is responsible for the management of the National Disability Insurance Scheme.

== List of ministers for Disability and the National Disability Insurance Scheme ==
The following individuals have been appointed as ministers for Disability and the National Disability Insurance Scheme, or any of its precedent titles:

Order	Minister	Party	Ministry	Title	Term start	Term end	Term in office
1	Jenny Macklin	Labor	2nd Gillard; 2nd Rudd	Minister for Disability Reform	14 December 2011	18 September 2013	1 year, 278 days
2	Stuart Robert	Liberal National	2nd Morrison	Minister for the National Disability Insurance Scheme	29 May 2019	30 March 2021	1 year, 305 days
3	Linda Reynolds	Liberal	2nd Morrison	Minister for the National Disability Insurance Scheme	30 March 2021	23 May 2022	1 year, 54 days
4	Bill Shorten	Labor	1st Albanese	Minister for the National Disability Insurance Scheme	1 June 2022	20 January 2025	2 years, 233 days
5	Amanda Rishworth	Labor	1st Albanese	Minister for the National Disability Insurance Scheme	20 January 2025	13 May 2025	113 days
6	Mark Butler	Labor	2nd Albanese	Minister for Disability and the National Disability Insurance Scheme	13 May 2025	Incumbent	1 year, 117 days

== List of assistant ministers ==
The following individuals have been appointed as Minister for the National Disability Insurance Scheme, or any of its precedent titles:

Order	Minister	Party	Ministry	Title	Term start	Term end	Term in office
1	Bill Shorten	Labor	1st Rudd; 1st Gillard	Parliamentary Secretary for Disabilities and Children's Services	3 December 2007	14 September 2010	2 years, 285 days
2	Jan McLucas	Labor	2nd Gillard	Parliamentary Secretary for Disabilities and Carers	14 September 2010	25 March 2013	2 years, 192 days
3	Amanda Rishworth	Labor	2nd Gillard; 2nd Rudd	Parliamentary Secretary for Disabilities and Carers	25 March 2013	18 September 2013	177 days
4	Jane Prentice	Liberal National	1st Turnbull	Assistant Minister for Disability Services	18 February 2016	19 July 2016	2 years, 191 days
4	Jane Prentice	Liberal National	2nd Turnbull	Assistant Minister for Social Services and Disability Services	19 July 2016	28 August 2018	2 years, 191 days
5	Sarah Henderson	Liberal	1st Morrison	Assistant Minister for Social Services and Disability Services	28 August 2018	29 May 2019	274 days
6	Anne Aly	Labor	1st Albanese	Minister Assisting the Minister for the National Disability Insurance Scheme	20 January 2025	13 May 2025	113 days
7	Jenny McAllister	Labor	2nd Albanese	Minister for the National Disability Insurance Scheme	13 May 2025	Incumbent	1 year, 117 days
