= 2019 cabinet reshuffle =

2019 cabinet reshuffle may refer to:

- 2019 Jordanian cabinet reshuffle
- 2019 Pakistani cabinet reshuffle
- 2019 Singaporean cabinet reshuffle
- 2019 Zimbabwean cabinet reshuffle

== See also ==
- 2018 cabinet reshuffle (disambiguation)
- 2020 cabinet reshuffle (disambiguation)
