= 2017 cabinet reshuffle =

2017 cabinet reshuffle may refer to:

- 2017 Croatian cabinet reshuffle
- 2017 Norwegian cabinet reshuffle
- 2017 Saudi Arabian cabinet reshuffle
- 2017 South African cabinet reshuffle

== See also ==
- 2016 cabinet reshuffle (disambiguation)
- 2018 cabinet reshuffle (disambiguation)
