= 2008 cabinet reshuffle =

2008 cabinet reshuffle may refer to:

- 2008 British cabinet reshuffle
- 2008 Norwegian cabinet reshuffle

== See also ==
- 2009 cabinet reshuffle
