= Mark Butler =

Australian politician (born 1970)

The Honourable Mark Butler MP
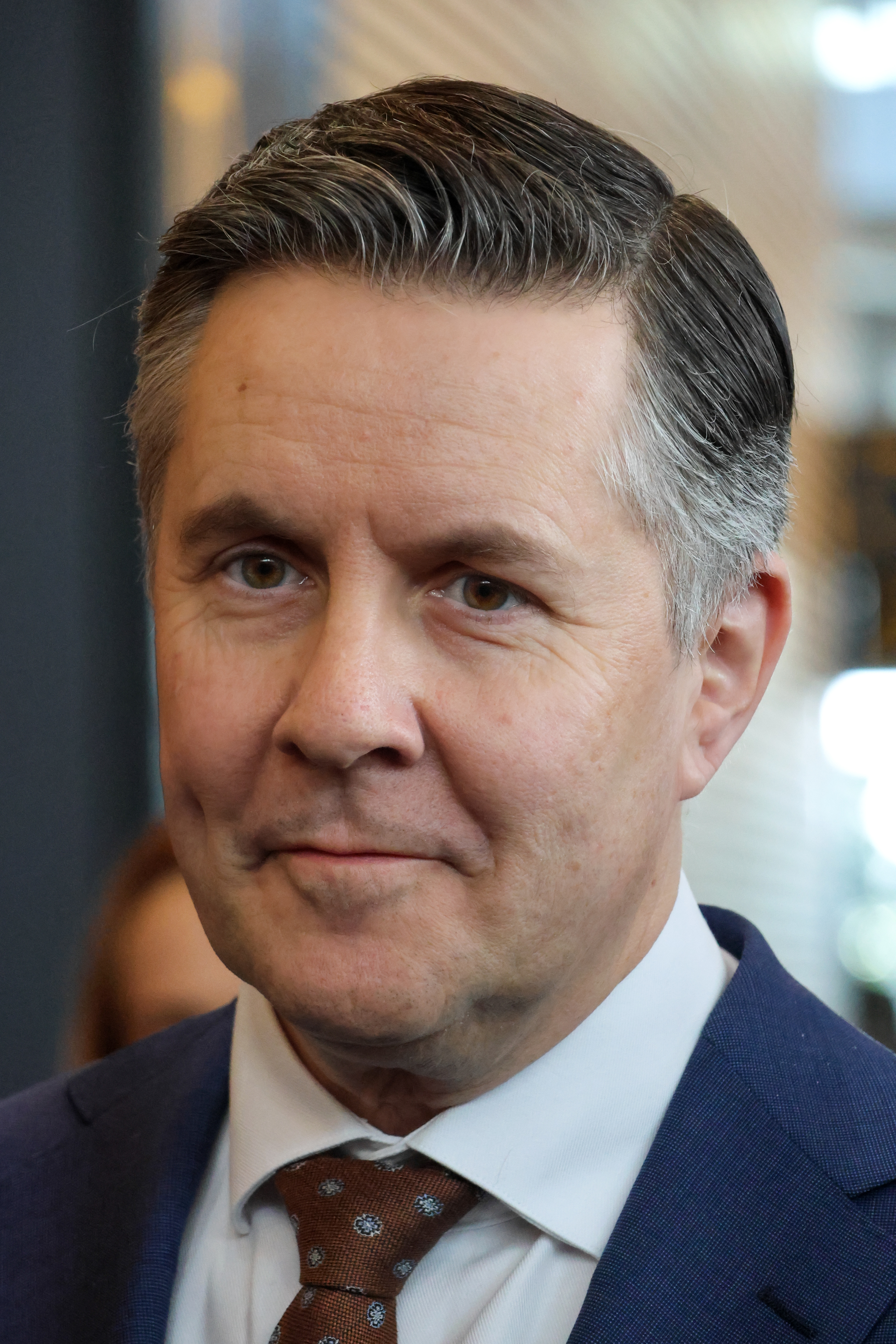
- Butler in 2026

Minister for Health and Ageing
- Incumbent
- Assumed office 1 June 2022
- Prime Minister: Anthony Albanese
- Preceded by: Greg Hunt

Minister for Disability and the National Disability Insurance Scheme
- Incumbent
- Assumed office 13 May 2025
- Prime Minister: Anthony Albanese
- Preceded by: Amanda Rishworth

Deputy Leader of the House
- Incumbent
- Assumed office 1 June 2022
- Prime Minister: Anthony Albanese
- Leader: Tony Burke
- Preceded by: David Gillespie

National President of the Labor Party
- In office 17 June 2015 – 18 June 2018
- Preceded by: Jenny McAllister
- Succeeded by: Wayne Swan
Cabinet Positions
Minister for Climate Change
In office 1 July 2013 – 18 September 2013
Prime Minister	Kevin Rudd
Preceded by	Greg Combet
Succeeded by	Office abolished
Minister for the Environment and Water
In office 1 July 2013 – 18 September 2013
Prime Minister	Kevin Rudd
Preceded by	Tony Burke
Succeeded by	Greg Hunt
Minister for Social Inclusion
In office 14 December 2011 – 1 July 2013
Prime Minister	Julia Gillard; Kevin Rudd
Preceded by	Tanya Plibersek
Succeeded by	Office Abolished
Minister for Mental Health and Ageing
In office 12 September 2010 – 1 July 2013
Prime Minister	Julia Gillard; Kevin Rudd
Preceded by	Nicola Roxon
Succeeded by	Jacinta Collins

Member of the Australian Parliament for Hindmarsh
- Incumbent
- Assumed office 18 May 2019
- Preceded by: Steve Georganas

Member of the Australian Parliament for Port Adelaide
- In office 24 November 2007 – 18 May 2019
- Preceded by: Rod Sawford
- Succeeded by: Division abolished

Personal details
- Born: Mark Christopher Butler; 8 July 1970 (age 56) Canberra, Australian Capital Territory, Australia
- Party: Australian Labor Party
- Education: Unley High School
- Alma mater: University of Adelaide - BA (Juris), LLB (Hons); Deakin University - MBA
- Occupation: Trade unionist
- Website: www.markbutler.net.au

Mark Christopher Butler (born 8 July 1970) is an Australian politician. He is a member of the Australian Labor Party (ALP) and has served in the House of Representatives since 2007. He was a minister in the Gillard and Rudd governments and also served as national president of the ALP from 2015 to 2018.

Butler studied arts and law at the University of Adelaide and international relations at Deakin University. Prior to entering parliament he was the South Australian secretary of the Liquor, Hospitality and Miscellaneous Union (LHMU). He was elected to the seat of Port Adelaide at the 2007 federal election, later switching to Hindmarsh in 2019. Butler was made a parliamentary secretary in 2009, becoming a minister after the 2010 election and winning promotion to cabinet the following year. He subsequently held the portfolios of Minister for Mental Health and Ageing (2010–2013), Social Inclusion (2011–2013), Housing and Homelessness (2013), Environment and Water (2013), and Climate Change (2013).

After the ALP's defeat at the 2013 election, Butler was a member of shadow cabinet under opposition leaders Bill Shorten and Anthony Albanese. He is a senior member of the Labor Left faction and was elected to a three-year term as national president in 2015.

After the ALP's win at the 2022 Australian federal election, Butler has held the portfolio of Minister for Health and Aged Care and is the Deputy Leader of the House. Following the 2025 Australian federal election, Butler also became the Minister for Disability and the National Disability Insurance Scheme.

== Early life and education ==
Mark Christopher Butler was born in Canberra on 8 July 1970, the son of Lindsay Nicholson and David Butler. His mother was a peace and anti-nuclear activist and campaigned to elect the Hawke and Keating governments. His father, a public servant and Vietnam war conscript, was the grandson of conservative South Australian premier Richard Layton Butler and the great-grandson of conservative South Australian premier Richard Butler, but was not politically active himself.

Butler's parents divorced when he was five years old, after which he and his brother moved to Adelaide with their mother. He attended Unley High School, taking a gap year in Italy before enrolling at the University of Adelaide. He graduated with a Bachelor of Arts in Jurisprudence and a Bachelor of Laws with first class honours. While at university he worked as a paralegal at Duncan Basheer Hannon (DBH). He was short-listed for a Rhodes Scholarship, and later completed a Master of International Relations degree at Deakin University.

Butler was active in student politics while at university. He was a housemate of future state MP Patrick Conlon and developed friendships with future premier Jay Weatherill and future federal minister Penny Wong; he and Weatherill were best man at each other's weddings.

== Trade union career ==
In 1992, Butler joined the Liquor Hospitality and Miscellaneous Workers' Union (LHMU) as a legal officer through his connections with Conlon. He made appearances before industrial tribunals, "pushing for cleaners and hospital workers to get better pay". In 1996 he was elected state secretary of the LHMU, winning by a single vote.

Butler developed a close working relationship with his NSW counterpart Anthony Albanese. He would later be Albanese's campaign manager in the October 2013 election for the Federal ALP Leadership. He was also noted for his constructive relationship with the Labor Right faction in South Australia, particularly then-secretary of the Shop, Distributive and Allied Employees Association, Don Farrell.

== Political career ==
Butler joined the ALP at a young age and became a delegate to state conference in South Australia in 1993. At the age of 23, he was a candidate for ALP preselection in the seat of Ross Smith prior to the 1993 South Australian state election. He subsequently was preselected for the seat of Hanson prior to the 1997 state election, but resigned to become state secretary of the LHMU. Butler served as state president of the Australian Labor Party (South Australian Branch) from 1997 to 1998, the youngest president in the party's history. He was elected as a delegate to national conference in 1998 and elected to the national executive in 2000, representing the Left faction.

=== Government (2007–2013) ===
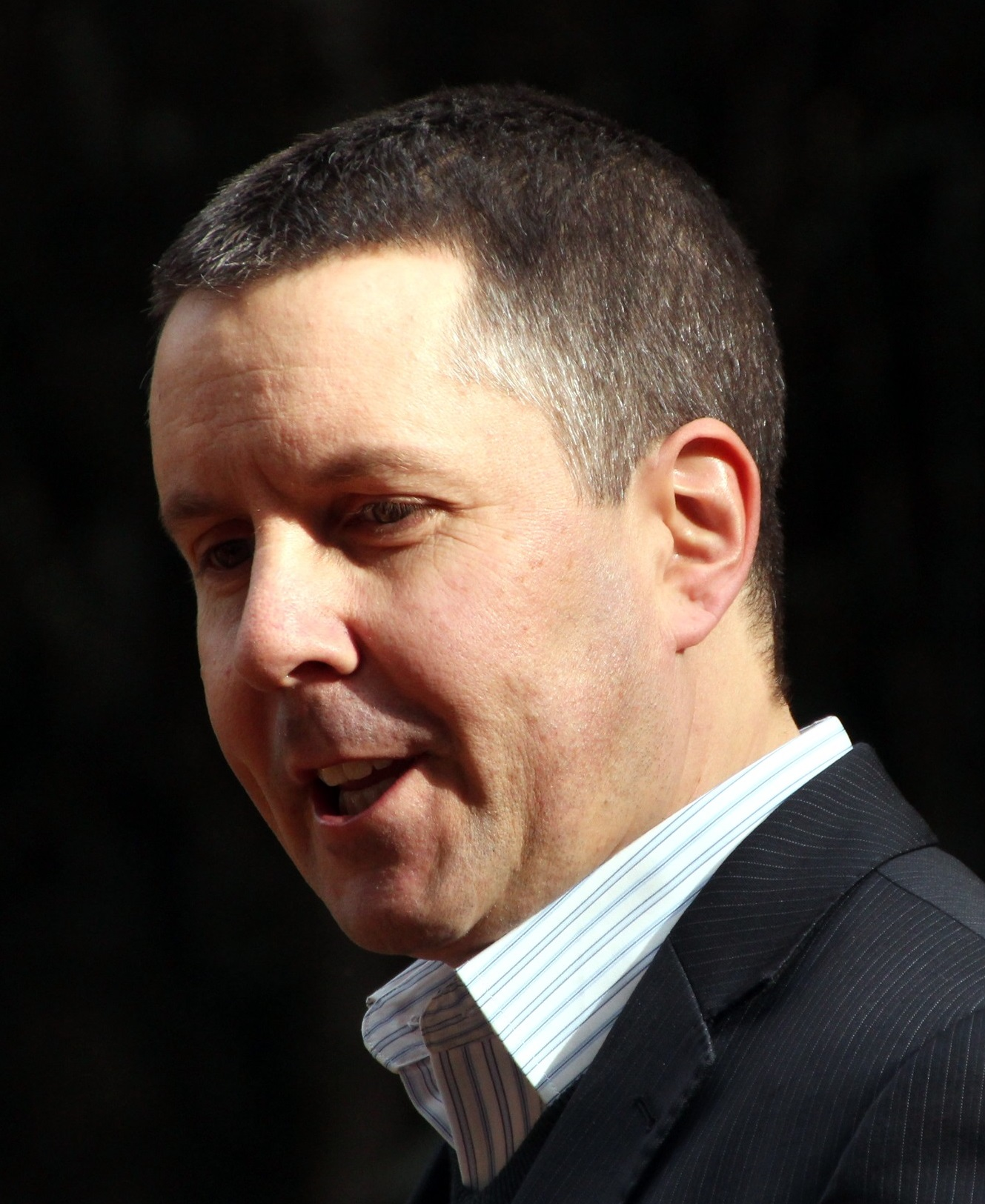
Butler in 2013

Butler was elected as the Labor member for the electoral division of Port Adelaide at the 2007 federal election.

In a 2009 First Rudd Ministry reshuffle, Butler was appointed Parliamentary Secretary for Health. On 14 September 2010, he was sworn in as Minister for Mental Health and Ageing in the Second Gillard Ministry. On 12 September 2011 he was given the additional responsibility of Minister Assisting the Prime Minister on Mental Health Reform. On 14 December 2011, Butler's ministry was renamed Mental Health and Aged Care, and he became a member of Cabinet.

=== Opposition (2013–2022) ===
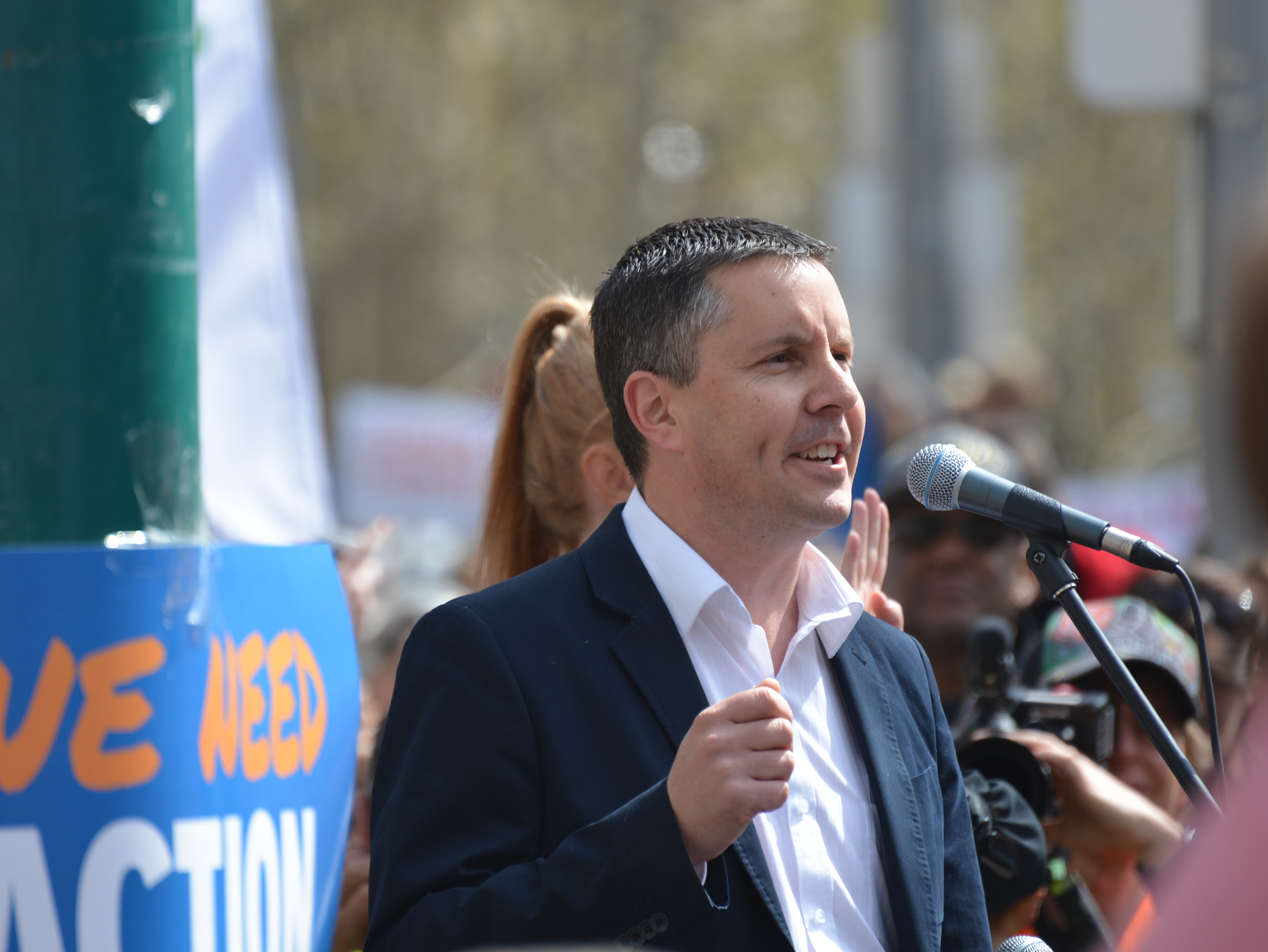
Butler at the People's Climate March in Melbourne in 2014

After the 2013 election, Bill Shorten named Butler as the Shadow Minister for the Environment.

On 17 June 2015, Butler was elected National President of the Australian Labor Party and was succeeded by Wayne Swan on 18 June 2018, becoming senior vice-president to Swan.

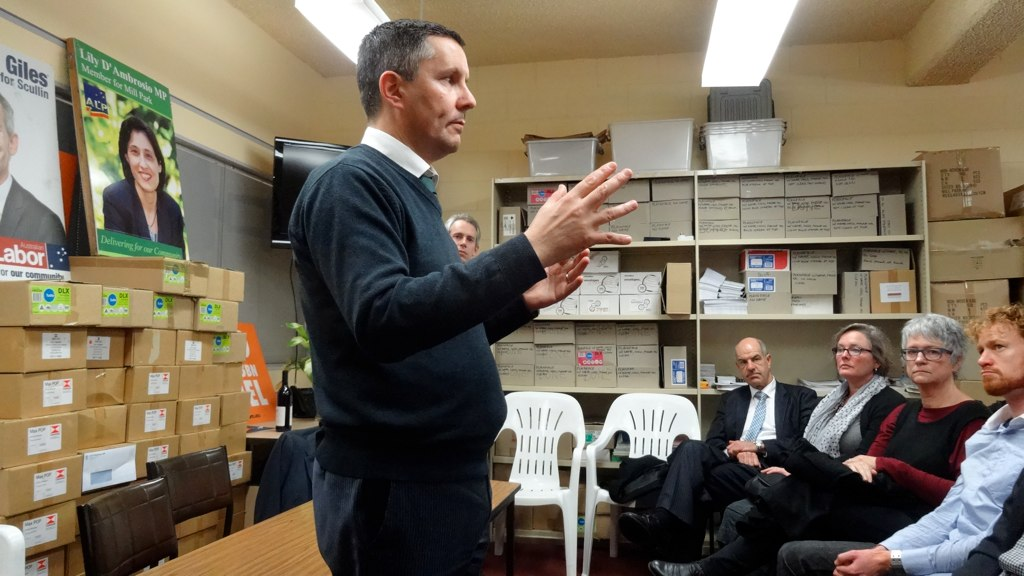
Butler in 2014 addressing a community meeting. Andrew Giles (behind Butler) and Kelvin Thomson (first seated on left) are also in attendance.

In a Shadow Cabinet reshuffle on 28 January 2021, Butler was moved from shadow Climate Change spokesperson to shadow spokesperson for Health.

=== Government (2022–present) ===
At the 2022 election, Butler was elected for Labor in the expanded seat of Hindmarsh, which included most of the area of the former seat of Port Adelaide, which had been abolished as part of the 2018 boundary redistribution.

In the incoming Albanese ministry Butler was appointed as Minister for Health and Aged Care.

In December 2022, Butler announced that the Medicare rebate for mental health sessions would be reduced from twenty to ten sessions, after the additional sessions included were temporarily extended by the Morrison government during the COVID-19 pandemic.

In May 2023 the Department for Health and Aged Care proposed a wide-ranging ban on e-cigarettes ("vapes"); Butler said "I want vaping to return to the purpose that we were told it was invented for, that is a therapeutic product to help long-term smokers quit."

After the Albanese government was re-elected at the 2025 federal election, Butler retained the health portfolio in the second Albanese ministry, renamed to Minister for Health and Ageing, while also taking on the role of Minister for Disability and the National Disability Insurance Scheme.

== Other activities ==
In 2023, Butler delivered the Hugh Stretton Oration at the University of Adelaide.

== Personal life ==
Butler has two children from a previous marriage and one from his second marriage. In 2021, he married former SBS, BBC World News and ABC journalist Daniela Ritorto.

As of 2024 he lives in Grange, a beachside suburb of Adelaide in South Australia. Butler supports the Port Adelaide Football Club, and is a pescetarian.

== See also ==
- First Rudd ministry
- First Gillard ministry
- Second Gillard ministry
- Second Rudd ministry
- Albanese ministry

Parliament of Australia
Preceded by Rod Sawford	Member for Port Adelaide; 2007–2019	Division abolished
Preceded by Steve Georganas	Member for Hindmarsh; 2019–present	Incumbent
Political offices
Preceded by Justine Elliot	Minister for Mental Health and Ageing; 2010–2013	Succeeded by Jacinta Collins
Preceded by Tanya Plibersek	Minister for Social Inclusion; 2011–2013	Succeeded by Julie Collins
Preceded by Tony Burke	Minister for Environment and Water; 2013	Succeeded by Greg Hunt
Preceded by Greg Combet	Minister for Climate Change; 2013	Office abolished
Preceded by Greg Hunt	Minister for Health and Aged Care; 2022–present	Incumbent
Party political offices
Preceded by Jenny McAllister	National President of the Australian Labor Party; 2015–2018	Succeeded by Wayne Swan
Preceded by Tim Hammond	Senior Vice-President of the Australian Labor Party; 2018–present	Incumbent
