= 2015 cabinet reshuffle =

2015 cabinet reshuffle may refer to:

- 2015 Greek cabinet reshuffle
- 2015 Indonesian cabinet reshuffle
- 2015 Jordanian cabinet reshuffle
- 2015 Norwegian cabinet reshuffle
- 2015 Palestinian cabinet reshuffle
- 2015 Saudi Arabian cabinet reshuffle

== See also ==
- 2014 cabinet reshuffle
- 2016 cabinet reshuffle
