= 2010 cabinet reshuffle =

2010 cabinet reshuffle may refer to:

- 2010 Danish cabinet reshuffle
- 2010 Democratic Republic of the Congo cabinet reshuffle
- 2010 Greek cabinet reshuffle
- 2010 Singaporean cabinet reshuffle

== See also ==
- 2009 cabinet reshuffle
- 2011 cabinet reshuffle
