= Jan McLucas =

Australian politician

The Honourable Jan McLucas

Senator for Queensland
- In office 1 July 1999 – 9 May 2016

Minister for Human Services
- In office 25 March 2013 – 18 September 2013
- Prime Minister: Julia Gillard; Kevin Rudd
- Preceded by: Kim Carr
- Succeeded by: Marise Payne

Personal details
- Born: 27 March 1958 (age 68) Atherton, Queensland, Australia
- Party: Australian Labor Party
- Education: Clayfield College; James Cook University
- Occupation: Politician
- Profession: Teacher

Jan Elizabeth McLucas (born 27 March 1958) is an Australian former politician. McLucas was an Australian Labor Party member of the Australian Senate representing Queensland from 1999 to 2016. McLucas was the Minister for Human Services in the Rudd Government until the 2013 Australian federal election.

== Early life and career ==
McLucas was born in Atherton, Queensland, and received her primary schooling in Ravenshoe, in Far North Queensland; her secondary schooling at the private Clayfield College in Brisbane, and further education at the Townsville College of Advanced Education (now James Cook University). From 1979 until 1989, she worked as a primary school teacher in state schools in Queensland, and was active in the Queensland Teachers' Union.

McLucas then worked as an electorate officer for Steve Bredhauer, her husband at the time and the state member for Cook, from 1991 until 1994, before being elected as a councillor for the City of Cairns, on which she served from 1995 to 1999.

== Political career ==
Following the announcement of the retirement of Margaret Reynolds, McLucas was preselected as the number one candidate on Queensland Labor's ticket for the Australian Senate in the 1998 federal election. This effectively guaranteed her the seat, and her first term commenced on 1 July 1999. In 2004, McLucas was elected by the Labor caucus to the Federal Shadow Ministry and was allocated responsibility for Ageing, Disabilities and Carers.

McLucas was re-elected to her Senate seat at the 2004 federal election, with a new term commencing on 1 July 2005. The Senator chaired the two Senate Select Committees of Inquiry into Medicare and was the Chair of the Senate Community Affairs Reference Committee.

The Labor Party under Kevin Rudd won government at the elections held on 24 November 2007. On 3 December 2007, at the creation of the First Rudd Ministry, she was appointed Parliamentary Secretary to the Minister for Health and Ageing.

In May 2009, journalists from The Australian and opponents in the Liberal Party claimed that Senator McLucas had effectively been living full-time with her partner in Canberra for several years, and only occasionally visited her officially listed residence in Cairns. Prime Minister Rudd refused calls from some in the media to sack her, while the Senator insisted she had claimed travel allowance consistent with the official guidelines. However, on 6 June 2009, it was announced that McLucas had resigned as Parliamentary Secretary "to focus on her senatorial responsibilities for Queensland." However, media speculation suggested the expenses issue and the unfavourable publicity generated by it may have been a factor in the decision.

McLucas was re-elected in the 2010 election and was sworn in on 14 September 2010 as Parliamentary Secretary for Disabilities and Carers in the original Second Gillard ministry. On 2 March 2012 she was appointed to the additional role of Parliamentary Secretary for the Prime Minister; and on 25 March 2013, McLucas was appointed as the Minister for Human Services.

After the Labor Party's defeat at the 2013 election, McLucas was appointed Shadow Minister for Mental Health, Housing and Homelessness under new Leader Bill Shorten. On 15 September, she resigned from the Shadow Cabinet.

Murray Watt challenged the Senator and while winning 57% of the branch vote, McLucas lost the union vote. She retired from the Senate at the double dissolution as of 9 May 2016.

Political offices
Preceded by Kim Carr	Minister for Human Services; 2013	Succeeded by Marise Payne
