= Tanya Plibersek =

Australian politician (born 1969)

The Honourable Tanya Plibersek MP
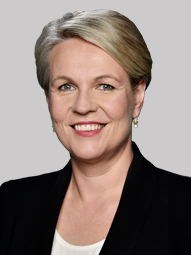
- Official portrait, 2022

Minister for Social Services
- Incumbent
- Assumed office 13 May 2025
- Prime Minister: Anthony Albanese
- Preceded by: Amanda Rishworth

Minister for the Environment and Water
- In office 1 June 2022 – 13 May 2025
- Prime Minister: Anthony Albanese
- Preceded by: Sussan Ley
- Succeeded by: Murray Watt
Previous positions
Deputy Leader of the Opposition
In office 14 October 2013 – 30 May 2019
Leader	Bill Shorten
Preceded by	Julie Bishop
Succeeded by	Richard Marles
Deputy Leader of the Labor Party
In office 14 October 2013 – 30 May 2019
Leader	Bill Shorten
Preceded by	Anthony Albanese
Succeeded by	Richard Marles
Minister for Health and Medical Research
In office 14 December 2011 – 18 September 2013
Prime Minister	Julia Gillard; Kevin Rudd
Preceded by	Nicola Roxon
Succeeded by	Peter Dutton
Minister for Human Services
In office 14 September 2010 – 14 December 2011
Prime Minister	Julia Gillard
Preceded by	Chris Bowen
Succeeded by	Brendan O'Connor
Minister for Social Inclusion
In office 14 September 2010 – 14 December 2011
Prime Minister	Julia Gillard
Preceded by	Simon Crean
Succeeded by	Mark Butler
Minister for Housing
In office 3 December 2007 – 14 September 2010
Prime Minister	Kevin Rudd; Julia Gillard
Preceded by	Brian Howe (1996)
Succeeded by	Mark Arbib
Minister for the Status of Women
In office 3 December 2007 – 14 September 2010
Prime Minister	Kevin Rudd; Julia Gillard
Preceded by	Julie Bishop
Succeeded by	Kate Ellis

Member of the Australian Parliament for Sydney
- Incumbent
- Assumed office 3 October 1998
- Preceded by: Peter Baldwin

Personal details
- Born: Tanya Joan Plibersek; 2 December 1969 (age 56) Sydney, New South Wales, Australia
- Party: Labor
- Spouse: Michael Coutts-Trotter (m. 2000)
- Education: University of Technology Sydney; Macquarie University
- Occupation: Politician
- Website: Official website

Tanya Joan Plibersek (Note: Slovene: [plibɛrʃɛk]) (born 2 December 1969) is an Australian politician who has served as Minister for Social Services since 2025 and the member of parliament (MP) for the New South Wales division of Sydney since 1998. Previously, she served as the Minister for the Environment and Water from 2022 to 2025, deputy leader of the Labor Party from 2013 to 2019, and held ministerial offices in the Rudd and Gillard governments.

Plibersek was born in Sydney to Slovenian immigrant parents and grew up in Sutherland Shire. She has degrees from the University of Technology Sydney and Macquarie University, and worked in the NSW Government's Domestic Violence Unit before entering parliament. Plibersek was elected to the Division of Sydney at the 1998 federal election, aged 28. She joined the shadow cabinet in 2004, and when Labor won the 2007 election was made Minister for Housing and Minister for the Status of Women.

In a cabinet reshuffle in 2010, Plibersek was made Minister for Human Services and Minister for Social Inclusion. She was promoted to Minister for Health the following year, and held that position until Labor's defeat at the 2013 election. Plibersek was then elected as deputy to new ALP leader Bill Shorten. Plibersek served as deputy opposition leader until Labor's defeat at the 2019 Australian federal election. She was subsequently made shadow minister for education under new opposition leader Anthony Albanese. Upon Labor's victory at the 2022 Australian federal election, she was appointed Minister for the Environment and Water. After the 2025 federal election she was made Minister for Social Services in the Second Albanese ministry. She is a senior figure in the Labor Left faction.

== Early life ==
Plibersek was born in Sydney, the youngest of three children born to Joseph and Rose Plibersek. Her elder brother Ray is a lawyer, and her eldest brother Phillip (d. 1997) was a geologist. Her parents were born in small Slovenian villages, arriving in Australia unknown to each other as part of the post-war immigration scheme. Her mother (née Rosalija Repič) was born in Podvinci, and came to Australia via Italy. Her father (né Jože Pliberšek) was born in Kočno pri Polskavi, and came to Australia via Austria. He found work as a labourer on the Snowy Mountains Scheme, and later spent 20 years working for Qantas as a plumber and gas fitter.

Plibersek grew up in the suburb of Oyster Bay in Sydney's Sutherland Shire. She attended Oyster Bay Public School and Jannali Girls High School, where she was the dux. She joined the Labor Party at the age of 15. Plibersek studied journalism at the University of Technology Sydney, graduating with a Bachelor of Arts in communications. She then took a Masters in Public Policy and Politics at Macquarie University. After a failed attempt to secure a cadetship with the Australian Broadcasting Corporation (ABC), she found work with the Domestic Violence Unit at the New South Wales Government's Office for the Status and Advancement of Women. She found working with the state women's minister Kerry Chikarovski "demoralising" and later criticised her for focusing on the glass ceiling rather than other women's issues. Plibersek subsequently joined the office of Senator Bruce Childs, before switching to work for Senator George Campbell as a research officer.

== Political career ==
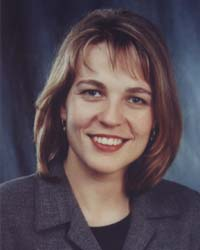
Official portrait, 1998

=== Opposition (1998–2007) ===
Plibersek was elected to the House of Representatives at the 1998 federal election, aged 28, retaining the Division of Sydney for the ALP following the retirement of Peter Baldwin. With the support of George Campbell's "hard left" faction, she won preselection for the seat against twelve other candidates, including ten other women. In the lead-up to the ballot she "wrote to each branch member three or four times, attended branch meetings virtually every night, gave talks to community groups, and contributed to three candidates' debates".

Plibersek supported Kim Beazley's unsuccessful candidacies in the 2003 ALP leadership votes, where he initially lost to Simon Crean and then later to Mark Latham. In July 2003 she and Anthony Albanese publicly criticised Crean for his rejection of the party's policy on a Second Sydney Airport.

After the 2004 election, Plibersek was elected to Latham's shadow ministry and allocated three portfolios – youth; the status of women; and work and family, community and early childhood education. In June 2005, after Latham was succeeded as opposition leader by Beazley, she retained the youth and status of women portfolios and was given responsibility for childcare. Upon the release of The Latham Diaries she described him as "a negative and critical person".

Plibersek publicly supported Beazley against Kevin Rudd in the 2006 leadership spill, though was retained in Rudd's shadow ministry after his defeat of Beazley, with the portfolios of youth; the status of women; and human services and housing.

=== Rudd and Gillard governments ===
Following the 2007 federal election, Plibersek was appointed Minister for Housing and Minister for the Status of Women in the First Rudd Ministry. Following the 2010 federal election, Plibersek was appointed Minister for Human Services and Minister for Social Inclusion. Her appointment took effect following the birth of Plibersek's youngest son Louis, and soon afterwards Plibersek directed the Human Services response to the 2010–11 Queensland floods. As Minister for Human Services, Plibersek established emergency and recovery centres to provide urgent support to flood-affected communities.

==== Housing ====
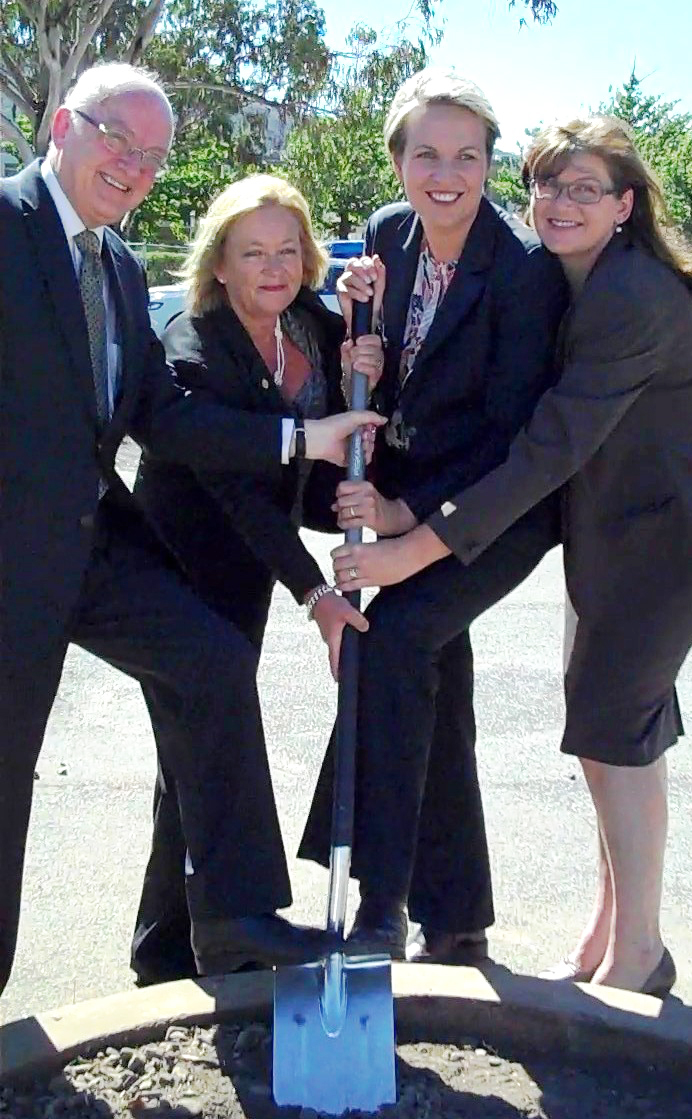
Plibersek in 2010 at a sod-turning ceremony for a Rudd government social housing program, along with Bob McMullan, Joy Burch and Kate Lundy

As Minister for Housing, Plibersek established the National Rental Affordability Scheme to build 50,000 affordable rental homes, invested $6 billion in social housing to build 21,600 new homes and repair 80,000 homes, and provided $550 million for homelessness services. The new housing was built ahead of time and under budget. She also established the Housing Affordability Fund and First Home Saver Accounts. In December 2008, along with Kevin Rudd, Prime Minister at that time, Plibersek released the Government's White Paper on Homelessness, The Road Home, which expressed a goal of halving homelessness by 2020. This goal was abandoned by the incoming Abbott government which cut homelessness funding and ended the National Rental Affordability Scheme and First Home Saver Accounts.

==== Women's issues ====
As Minister for the Status of Women, Plibersek convened the National Council to Reduce Violence against Women and their Children in May 2008, and released the National Council's Plan for Australia to Reduce Violence Against Women and their Children in March 2009 – the first in Australian history. Plibersek also addressed the 2009 United Nations International Women's Day event, attended by United Nations Secretary General Ban Ki-moon, and announced Australia's formal accession to the United Nations Optional Protocol to the Convention on the Elimination of All Forms of Discrimination Against Women (CEDAW). Plibersek said that acceding to the Optional Protocol "will send a strong message that Australia is serious about promoting gender equality and that we are prepared to be judged by international human rights standards."

Plibersek played a key role in designing and securing Australia's first paid parental leave scheme.

Plibersek also strengthened Australia's anti-people trafficking strategy, with a focus on better supporting victims including women in the sex industry.

As Shadow Minister for Women, Plibersek also committed the Labor Opposition to expanding access to abortions by making termination services legal in all taxpayer-funded hospitals. This policy was later dumped from Labor's election commitments under Albanese.

In Opposition, Plibersek supported women's economic security by committing the Labor Opposition to the removal of the $450 per month minimum income threshold for eligibility for the superannuation guarantee, a policy later adopted by the Liberal Government.

Plibersek also committed to forcing companies with over one thousand employees to disclose the gap in salaries between male and female staff. This was dismissed by the Morrison Liberal Government at the time as setting "one set of employees against another".

==== Health ====
As Minister for Health Plibersek established Grow Up Smiling, a $4 billion package to support better dental care for children, which expanded Medicare-subsided dental check-ups for children from age 2 to 17. She introduced free Gardasil vaccinations, previously only available for girls, for boys to protect against cancers caused by HPV – a world first. Along with the previous Health Minister, Nicola Roxon, Plibersek also implemented world-leading plain packaging of tobacco laws which saw smoking rates drop to 13%. Plibersek also added the RU486 abortion pill to the PBS, improving access to reproductive healthcare.

When Plibersek was Minister for Health, Australia achieved the best 5-year cancer survival rates in the world. Plibersek also delivered 1,300 more hospital beds and 60,000 additional doctors, nurses and allied health professionals. She also oversaw the funding, construction and/or opening of a number of new facilities, including the Chris O’Brien Lifehouse Cancer Centre, the Kinghorn Cancer Centre, the Launceston Multi-Purpose Health Centre, and a new medical and dental school as well as new facilities for the South Australian Health and Medical Research Institute (SAHMRI) in Adelaide.

Plibersek further added 87 new medicines to the Pharmaceutical Benefits Scheme (PBS) between 2012–2013. introduced the Living Longer Living Better reforms, allocating $1.2 billion to improve aged care services between 2012–2013, approved the first rapid HIV test for point-of-care use in Australia, providing results within an hour.

=== Opposition (2013–2022) ===
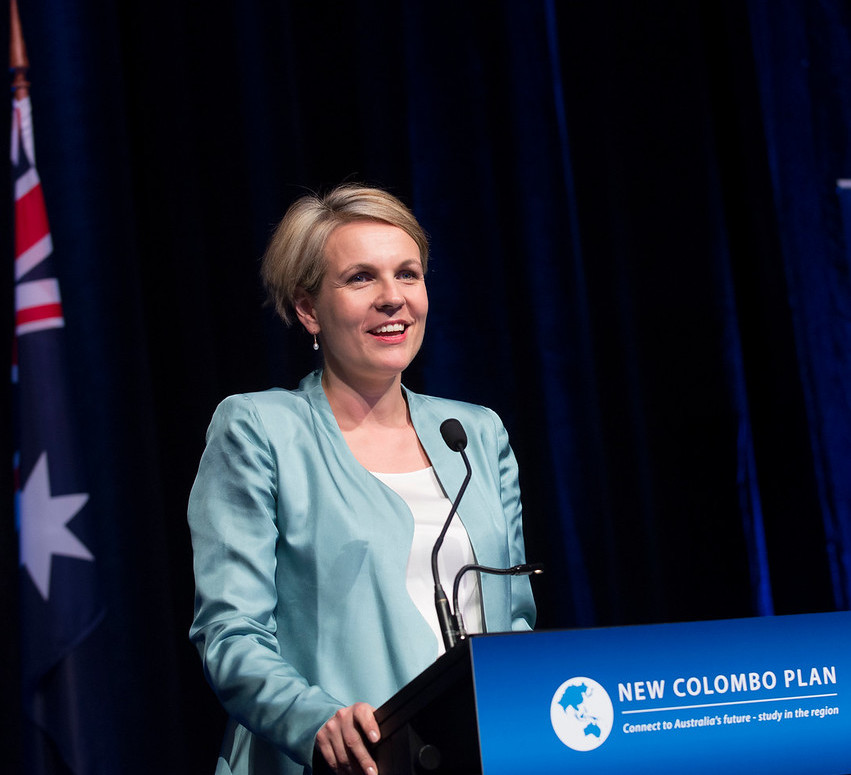
Tanya Plibersek speaking at New Colombo Plan in 2013

Plibersek was unanimously elected deputy leader of the Labor Party (and thus Deputy Leader of the Opposition) on 14 October 2013, following the leadership election that had seen Bill Shorten succeed Kevin Rudd as leader. She was Shadow Minister for Foreign Affairs and International Development until July 2016. Following the 2016 election, she was made Shadow Minister for Education and Shadow Minister for Women. Shorten said handing Plibersek the education portfolio was "about putting a great policy thinker on the political frontline".

Plibersek was re-elected at the 2019 election with a swing of 5.7 points to the Labor Party. Following the party's defeat at the federal election of 2019 and Bill Shorten's immediate resignation as party leader, Plibersek made it known that she was interested in standing in the leadership election, and was supported by Shorten and former prime minister Julia Gillard; however, she concluded that "now is not my time", citing family responsibilities.

After Anthony Albanese's victory in the leadership contest, Plibersek was appointed Shadow Minister for Education and Training in his new shadow cabinet. In January 2021 Albanese also appointed her Shadow Minister for Women.

=== Government (2022–present) ===
Plibersek was appointed Minister for the Environment and Water in the first Albanese ministry.

Upon Peter Dutton's election as Leader of the Opposition, Plibersek compared Dutton to Lord Voldemort. In a radio interview, she stated:

"I think there will be a lot of children who have watched a lot of Harry Potter films who will be very frightened of what they are seeing on TV at night. I am saying he looks a bit like Voldemort. We will see whether he can do what he promised he would do when he was last running for leader, which is smile more."

Plibersek later apologised. In a radio interview, Dutton called the claims "unfortunate" but "water off a duck's back", also noting that he wasn't "bald by choice" and was diagnosed with a skin condition several years ago. Plibersek's apology was welcomed by newly elected Prime Minister Anthony Albanese in an interview with ABC News.

In November 2024, Plibersek reached an agreement with the Greens and independent senator David Pocock to pass legislation to create a national environment protection agency. However, the legislation was scrapped at the last minute after intervention from Prime Minister Albanese.

After the re-election of the Albanese government in the 2025 federal election, Plibersek was moved to the role of Minister for Social Services in the second Albanese ministry.

== Political positions ==
Plibersek is a member of the Labor Party's left faction.

=== Economy and employment ===
Plibersek has argued that government should actively invest in the economy to promote growth and equality, calling for a federal commitment to a policy of full employment where "Australians who can work, can get a job". During the coronavirus recession of 2020, she has advocated government stimulus over tax cuts for high income earners. In September 2020, she explained her priorities for economic recovery: "We need to be building things in Australia to support both the skilled trades people and the apprentices that we should be training right now. We need to build things. We need to make things. We need to care for people. We need secure jobs with decent pay".

Education

Plibersek is a long-term supporter of investing in education. As the shadow Minister for Education and Training she has developed policies across schools, universities, TAFE and vocational education. Prior to the 2019 election, these policies included increasing school funding by $14 billion over a decade, to the creation of a new Evidence Institute for Schools and instituting a review of the country's NAPLAN testing system. In higher education Plibersek promised to reintroduce the demand driven system of university funding, creating an extra 200,000 places for students.

Energy

Plibersek is a strong supporter of renewable energy and transitioning towards clean energy production. She has argued that the renewables industry is key to promoting new jobs, assisting local manufacturing, lowering carbon emissions and reducing power prices. She has also endorsed programs to help households install solar panels on their homes – which have been adopted by over two and a half million Australia households. In 2018, Plibersek argued against providing federal subsidies for new coal fired power plants.

Housing After the 2007 election, Plibersek was made Federal Minister for Housing in the Rudd government. As part of the government's response to the 2008 financial crisis, Plibersek implemented several policies that both grew the housing stock and stimulated the Australian economy. These policies included the First Home Owners Boost, providing up to $21,000 for people buying new dwellings, the National Rental Affordability Scheme, providing incentives for investors to build properties for low and middle income Australians, and $6 billion for the construction, repair and improvement of social housing. Plibersek also released the Homelessness White Paper, which set out a comprehensive national plan to tackle homelessness in Australia with significant funding attached. Plibersek has argued that significant new investment in social and public housing should be part of Australia's response to the coronavirus economic downturn.

Welfare

Plibersek supports an increase to Newstart, Australia's then-unemployment benefit, arguing that the current rate is too low, "trapping people in poverty" who are "just surviving" on an allowance of $40 a day.

=== Social Issues ===
Women's reproductive rights

Plibersek is pro-choice. As Minister for Health, Plibersek approved listing the abortion drug RU-486 on the Pharmaceutical Benefits Scheme. Plibersek described the provision of the medicine as "a good thing in the situation where women are faced with one of the most difficult decisions that they will ever make". Anti-abortion groups criticised the move, with one campaigner, Margaret Tighe, labelling it a "gross abuse of power." Other commentators, including Clementine Ford, labelled the decision "progressive".

First Nations people

Plibersek supports instituting an Indigenous Voice to Parliament, based on the recommendations made in the Uluru Statement from the Heart. As Deputy Leader of the Labor Party, she stated that implementing the Indigenous Voice was her party's priority in Indigenous affairs, alongside ‘closing the gap’, particularly in health and education.

An Australian republic

Plibersek supports Australia becoming a Republic. As a first term Member of Parliament in 1999, she campaigned for the yes vote in the constitutional referendum to replace the Queen and Governor-General with a President appointed by a two-thirds majority of the members of the Commonwealth Parliament.

LGBT rights

From the 1990s onward, Plibersek campaigned for the removal of discrimination against same-sex de facto couples from federal legislation, raising the issue formally in Parliament on multiple occasions during her parliamentary career (including 1999, 2006, and 2008). In her regular paid advertisement in the South Sydney Herald, Plibersek wrote that "The passing of these reforms to federal legislation was one of the proudest moments of my time in the Australian Parliament" and she has marched in the Sydney Gay and Lesbian Mardi Gras Parade almost every year for three decades.

As deputy leader, Plibersek led the push to make support for same-sex marriage binding Labor policy which resulted in many Labor MPs speaking out publicly in support of same-sex marriage. Plibersek seconded a private members bill to legalise same sex marriage, moved by Labor leader Bill Shorten. She opposed the 2017 postal plebiscite, arguing it was unnecessary and divisive, but campaigned strongly for the ‘yes’ vote during the plebiscite campaign.

Multiculturalism and citizenship

As an Australian with Slovenian heritage, Plibersek is vocal advocate for multiculturalism. On an episode of Q&A in 2018 she clashed with conservative Senator Matthew Canavan on the topic of immigration, arguing against Canavan's claim that immigrants congregated through ‘ghettoisation’. Before the 2019 election, Plibersek pledged $8 million towards community language schools, to expand language training for children.

In January 2020 Plibersek aroused controversy in an Australia Day speech, calling for children to learn the Australian citizenship pledge at school. In the speech, Plibersek argued that progressives should feel more comfortable with the concept of patriotism: "You can be proud of your citizenship and dedicated to progress. You can cherish this nation and want to make it better. You can be a progressive and love your country: I certainly do."

Foreign aid

As Shadow Minister for Foreign Affairs, Plibersek opposed the cuts to foreign aid made by the Abbott Liberal government. At the 2016 election Labor promised to reverse those cuts if elected.

Iraq

Plibersek opposed the 2003 invasion of Iraq. In 2003, when then-US President George W. Bush visited Australia, Tanya presented national security adviser Condoleezza Rice with a letter, signed by 43 Labor MPs, explaining why Labor parliamentarians opposed Australia invading Iraq without United Nations approval. She also stated in Parliament, "I do not support an attack on Iraq. I particularly do not support a pre-emptive first strike. Nor do I support any action that is initiated by the US alone rather than being sanctioned by the United Nations."

East Timor

While Shadow Minister for Foreign Affairs in 2016, Plibersek proposed that Australia redraw its maritime border with East Timor. According to the Sydney Morning Herald, "Ms Plibersek lamented that Australia's pivotal role in securing East Timor's independence – "a proud moment" – was being tarnished by its refusal to negotiate a new, permanent maritime boundary with East Timor. "The maritime boundary dispute has poisoned relations with our newest neighbour. This must change for their sake and ours," Ms Plibersek said." This position was later adopted by the Liberal government, and a new border agreement treaty was signed in 2018.

Israel

Speaking in the House of Representatives on 17 September 2002, Plibersek said: "I can think of a rogue state which consistently ignores UN resolutions, whose ruler is a war criminal responsible for the massacres of civilians in refugee camps outside its borders. The US supports and funds this country. This year it gave it a blank cheque to continue its repression of its enemies. It uses US military hardware to bulldoze homes and kill civilians. It is called Israel, and the war criminal is Ariel Sharon. Needless to say, the US does not mention the UN resolutions that Israel has ignored for 30 years; it just continues sending the money..."

Plibersek's remarks again gained prominence in October 2013, after she and Bill Shorten were elected as deputy leader and leader of the Labor Party, respectively. After choosing to take on the foreign affairs portfolio while in opposition, Liberal Party MP Julie Bishop, then Minister for Foreign Affairs, said Plibersek should "publicly retract those statements". The Australian noted that Plibersek's appointment was likely to be criticised by the Jewish community in Australia.

But the Executive Council of Australian Jewry expressed satisfaction in Plibersek's elevation to the deputy leadership, noting that she had ‘developed friendly relations with the Jewish Community’. Plibersek visited Israel and the State of Palestine in February 2014, meeting with the Prime Minister of Palestine, Rami Hamdallah.

== List of portfolios ==
Plibersek has held the following portfolios and parliamentary party positions since her election in 1998 (both shadow and government appointments are listed):

- 26 October 2004 – 10 December 2006: Shadow Minister for Work and Family, Child Care and Youth
- 26 October 2004 – 24 June 2005: Shadow Minister for Women
- 26 October 2004 – 24 June 2005: Shadow Minister for Community
- 10 December 2006 – 3 December 2007: Shadow Minister for Human Services, Housing, Youth and Women
- 3 December 2007 – 14 September 2010: Minister for Housing
- 3 December 2007 – 14 September 2010: Minister for the Status of Women
- 14 September 2010 – 14 December 2011: Minister for Human Services
- 14 September 2010 – 14 December 2011: Minister for Social Inclusion
- 14 December 2011 – 1 July 2013: Minister for Health
- 1 July 2013 – 18 September 2013: Minister for Health and Medical Research
- 14 October 2013 – 30 May 2019: Deputy Leader of the Opposition
- 14 October 2013 – 30 May 2019: Deputy Leader of the Federal Parliamentary Labor Party
- 18 October 2013 – 23 July 2016: Shadow Minister for Foreign Affairs and International Development
- 23 July 2016 – 30 May 2019: Shadow Minister for Education
- 23 July 2016 – 30 May 2019: Shadow Minister for Women
- 30 May 2019 – 23 May 2022: Shadow Minister for Education and Training
- 28 January 2021 – 23 May 2022: Shadow Minister for Women
- 1 June 2022 – 13 May 2025: Minister for the Environment and Water
- 13 May 2025 – present: Minister for Social Services

== Personal life ==
Plibersek lives in Sydney with her husband Michael Coutts-Trotter, who is a senior NSW public servant, and three children.

Following the 2010 federal election, when Labor retained government with the support of the Australian Greens and independents, parliamentary numbers were finely balanced. After some controversy, Plibersek was granted a pair by the Coalition so that her absence from the House of Representatives while on maternity leave did not affect the result of votes. She gave birth to her son later that year.

In September 2016, her older brother Ray Plibersek was elected to Sutherland Shire council representing C Ward for the Australian Labor Party.

Plibersek is fond of bushwalking and Jane Austen novels.

== See also ==
- First Rudd ministry
- First Gillard ministry
- Second Gillard ministry

== Notes ==
Parliament of Australia
Preceded by Peter Baldwin	Member for Sydney; 1998–present	Incumbent
Political offices
Preceded by Brian Howe	Minister for Housing; 2007–2010	Succeeded by Mark Arbib
Preceded by Chris Bowen	Minister for Human Services; 2010–2011	Succeeded by Brendan O'Connor
Preceded by Nicola Roxon	Minister for Health; 2011–2013	Succeeded by Peter Dutton
Preceded by Julie Bishop	Deputy Leader of the Opposition; 2013–2019	Succeeded by Richard Marles
Preceded by Sussan Ley	Minister for the Environment and Water; 2022–2025	Succeeded by Murray Watt
Preceded by Amanda Rishworth	Minister for Social Services; 2025–present	Incumbent
Party political offices
Preceded by Anthony Albanese	Deputy Leader of the Labor Party; 2013–2019	Succeeded by Richard Marles
