= Amanda Rishworth =

Australian politician (born 1978)

The Honourable Amanda Rishworth MP
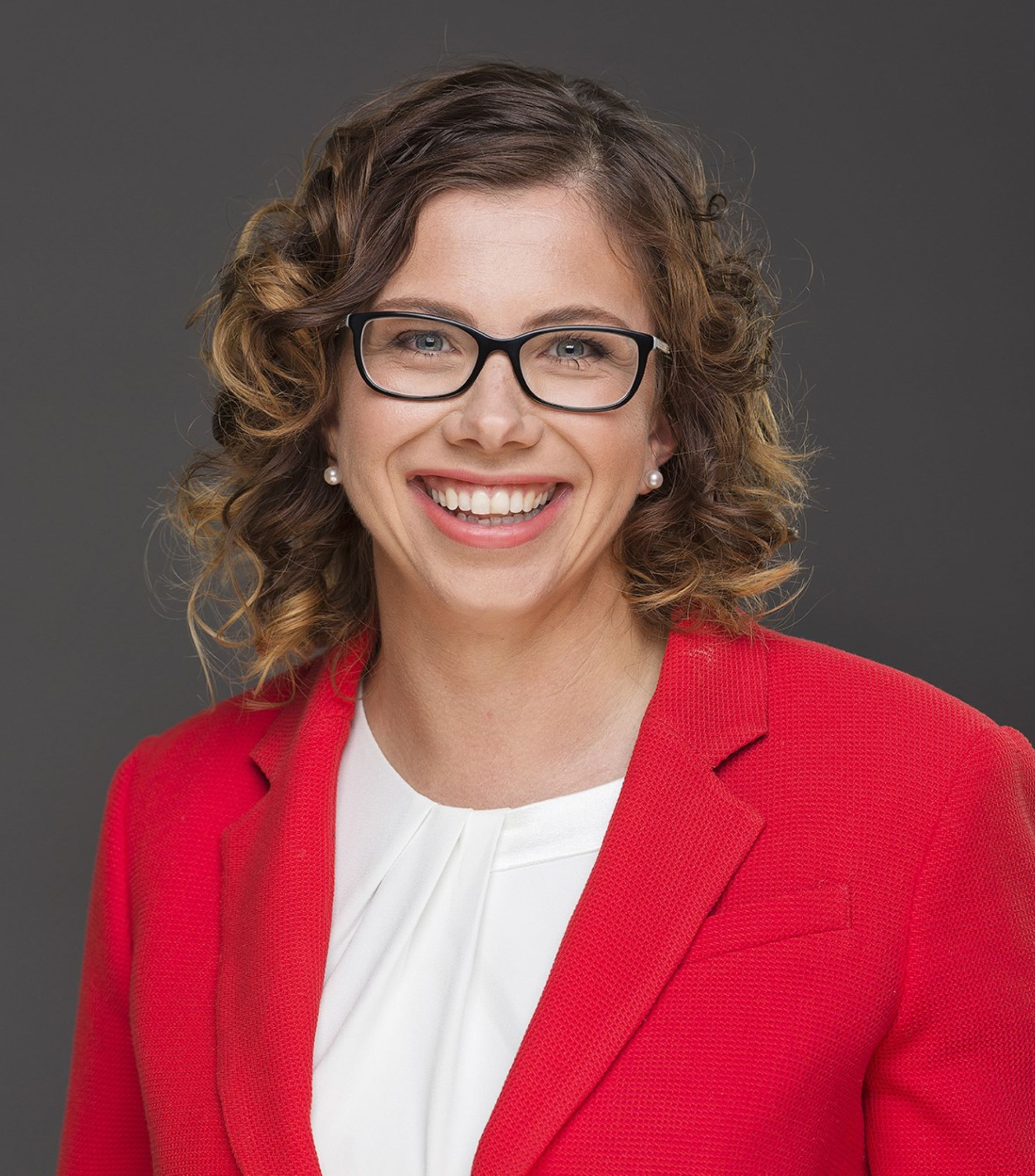
- Official portrait, 2018

Minister for Employment and Workplace Relations
- Incumbent
- Assumed office 13 May 2025
- Prime Minister: Anthony Albanese
- Preceded by: Murray Watt

Minister for the National Disability Insurance Scheme
- In office 20 January 2025 – 13 May 2025
- Prime Minister: Anthony Albanese
- Preceded by: Bill Shorten
- Succeeded by: Mark Butler

Minister for Social Services
- In office 1 June 2022 – 13 May 2025
- Prime Minister: Anthony Albanese
- Preceded by: Anne Ruston
- Succeeded by: Tanya Plibersek

Member of the Australian Parliament for Kingston
- Incumbent
- Assumed office 24 November 2007
- Preceded by: Kym Richardson

Personal details
- Born: 10 July 1978 (age 48) Bedford Park, South Australia, Australia
- Party: Labor
- Spouse: Timothy Walker
- Children: Two
- Education: Flinders University, University of Adelaide
- Occupation: Psychologist
- Website: rishworth.com.au

Amanda Louise Rishworth (born 10 July 1978) is an Australian politician who has served as the Minister for Employment and Workplace Relations since 2025. A member of the Labor Party, she has been the member of Parliament (MP) for the South Australian division of Kingston since 2007. She was previously the Minister for Social Services from 2022 to 2025, as well as the Minister for the National Disability Insurance Scheme in 2025.

== Early years ==
Rishworth was born on 10 July 1978, at Flinders Medical Centre in Bedford Park, South Australia. She is one of three children born to Judith and Leslie Rishworth.

Risworth attended Unley High School. She was a retail worker and swimming instructor while also doing volunteer surf lifesaving duties at Seacliff. She later worked as an organiser and trainer for the Shop Distributive and Allied Employees Association (SDA) and was president of Australian Young Labor in 2000.

Rishworth studied psychology at Flinders University where she was president of the students' union before furthering her studies at the University of Adelaide with a master's degree in clinical psychology. She then became a practising psychologist in 2005 working in the delivery of mental health care to the community.

== Political career ==
=== Early career ===
Rishworth was a Labor candidate at the 2006 state election for the electoral district of Fisher, where she was defeated by sitting independent Bob Such. Labor received a 59.4 per cent two-party-preferred vote from a 15.1-point swing against the Liberals, marking the first time since the 1985 state election that Labor won the two-party-preferred vote in Fisher.

In November 2006 Rishworth was preselected unopposed to contest the key marginal seat of Kingston, located in the south of Adelaide, at the 2007 federal election. She was up against the sitting Coalition member Kym Richardson who held the most marginal seat for his party after winning it at the 2004 federal election by just 119 votes. Two opinion polls conducted throughout the year by The Advertiser had a swing to Rishworth of up to 7 per cent. Key issues she concentrated on included the lack of broadband access in the electorate, as well as the shortage of doctors. During a debate on industrial relations centring on the Howard government's controversial WorkChoices legislation, Rishworth was forced to debate minister Joe Hockey after Richardson pulled out with a prior commitment. Once the election campaign began local announcements included a $12.5 million GP Super Clinic and a $7 million upgrade to the South Road and Victor Harbor Road intersection. A poll midway through the campaign had Rishworth with a similar lead over Richardson to earlier opinion polls and on election day she ended up defeating him with a 54.4 per cent two-party-preferred vote from a 4.5-point swing, one of the seats that took the party from opposition to government after nearly 12 years.

=== Government (2007–2013) ===
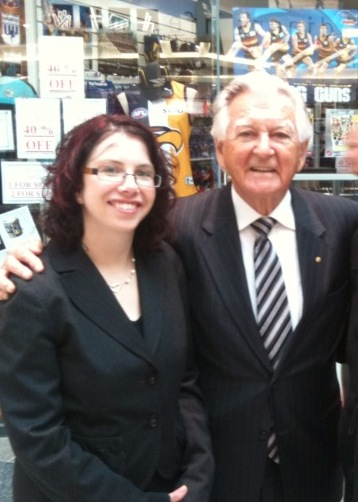
Rishworth with former prime minister Bob Hawke in 2010

Rishworth gave her first speech to the House of Representatives in February 2008. She spoke of the time when she was a retail worker at Toys "R" Us during her teenage years and was offered an Australian workplace agreement (AWA) as a result of new laws introduced by the Howard government, which she refused to sign and as a result was put out of work.

"Industrial relations has been important to me for many years. I felt the hard edge of the 1996 workplace relations legislation when I was offered an AWA while employed by a large American retailer. I refused to sign and was no longer offered work despite my five years of loyal service. I was 19 years old at the time. Hence, industrial reform and the enforcement of AWAs is not merely an abstract concept for me."

Rishworth's work in the parliament included being a member of the health and ageing, communications as well as the industry, science and innovation committees.

In September 2008, Rishworth introduced a private member's bill in the parliament calling for a new agreement between the Australian and British governments concerning the need to index the British pension in Australia.

In February 2010, Rishworth again introduced a private member's bill into parliament, this time calling for a new code of conduct for the media industry to moderate the rapid growth of sexualisation in video clips, magazines, clothes and the internet.

At the 2010 federal election, Rishworth's Liberal party opponent was Chris Zanker, a chief inspector with the South Australian Police who was preselected a month before the election was called. During the campaign, Rishworth focussed on her record with construction underway on the GP super clinic as well as securing funds for an extension of the Noarlunga railway line to Seaford. A poll by The Advertiser showed a 12-point swing to her, with some suggesting this was in part due to new prime minister Julia Gillard having grown up in the Adelaide area. She was later re-elected with a 63.9 per cent two-party vote from a 9.5-point two-party swing, the largest margin of any party in Kingston's history, and the highest swing of any 2010 Labor candidate in the country, an election where the party suffered a 2.6-point swing against it nationally. Kingston went from the most marginal Labor seat in South Australia into the second-safest (behind only Port Adelaide).

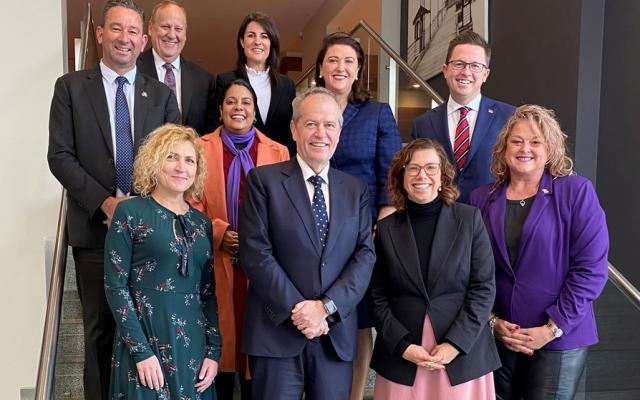
Rishworth (third, front row) attending a Commonwealth meeting in June 2022

On 11 March 2011, Rishworth and four other Australian parliamentarians were stuck on a bullet train heading from Kyoto to Tokyo for around five hours because of the Tōhoku earthquake and tsunami. They were in Japan on a young leaders exchange.

Rishworth was chair of the House of Representatives standing committee on education and employment as well as being a member of the Joint Standing electoral matters and Joint Select cyber-safety committees. She was also part of the Speaker's panel and was promoted to Parliamentary Secretary for Sustainability and Urban Water along with Disabilities and Carers in March 2013.

=== Opposition (2013–2022) ===
Rishworth retained her seat of Kingston at the 2013 election with a 59.7 per cent two-party vote from a 4.9-point swing, then the second-largest margin of any party in Kingston's history. Labor, however, lost government, making Rishworth only the fourth opposition MP in the seat's history. She was subsequently named Shadow Parliamentary Secretary for Health in the Shorten Shadow Ministry. On 24 June 2014, she was promoted to the Shadow outer ministry as Shadow Assistant Minister for Education.

She again retained her seat at the 2016 election with a 67 per cent two-party vote from a 7.3-point swing, the largest margin of any party in Kingston's history. Though Kingston remained Labor's second-safest South Australian seat behind Port Adelaide, Rishworth's primary vote of 49.4 per cent was the highest any candidate received throughout the eleven South Australian seats. Though Labor picked up a two-party swing in all eleven seats, the presence of Nick Xenophon Team candidates in all eleven seats produced, apart from a suppressed major party primary vote, a result where Rishworth was the only major party candidate in the state to pick up a primary vote swing.

Following the 2016 election, Rishworth was named Shadow Minister for Veterans' Affairs and Shadow Minister for Defence Personnel. In late 2017 Rishworth was also named Shadow Minister for Early Childhood Education and Development and was promoted to Shadow Cabinet.

=== Government (2022–present) ===
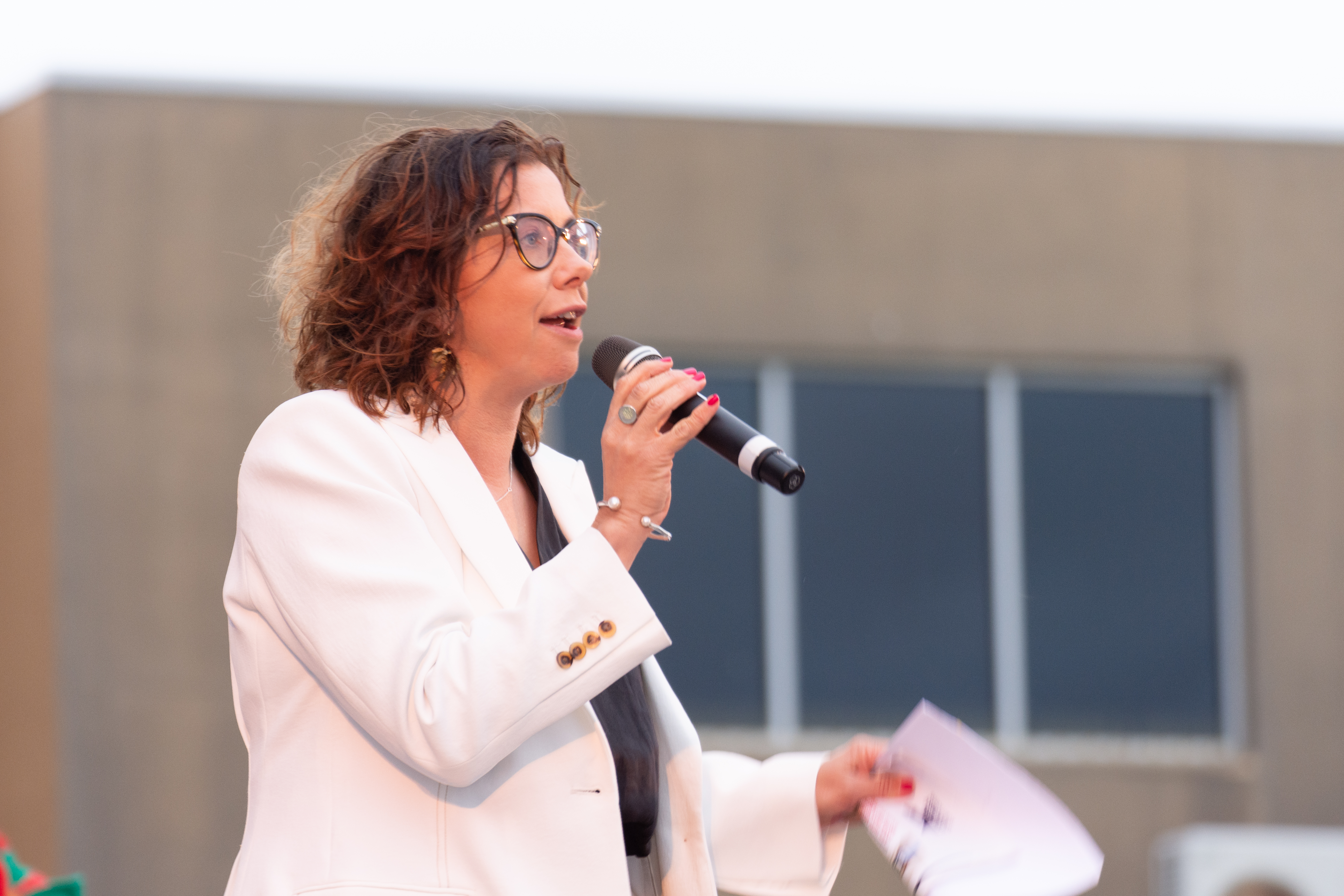
Rishworth at a Christmas event in December 2022

Following the ALP's victory at the 2022 election, Rishworth was appointed Minister for Social Services in the Albanese government on 1 June 2022 and included as a member of cabinet. On 13 May 2025 Rishworth was sworn in as the Minister for Employment and Workplace Relations.

At the 2025 election, Amanda Rishworth's Liberal opponent in Kingston was her cousin Jim Rishworth, though the cousins haven't crossed paths for 25 years and Amanda defeated Jim with a swing towards her on a two-party preferred basis of 4.39%.

On August 2025, Rishworth as minister lead the passage of the Fair Work Amendment (Protecting Penalty and Overtime Rates) Act 2025 which codified penalty rates into law.

On May 2026, Rishworth announced reform to employment services, seeking to end "one-size-fits-all" employment services.

== Positions ==
Rishworth is a member of Labor Right.

Rishworth supports same-sex marriage, and voted in support of a bill in Federal Parliament in 2012 and 2017.

== Personal life ==
Rishworth married Timothy Walker in January 2013 and they have two sons. She lives in the Kingston electorate at Hallett Cove and continues to be a volunteer surf lifesaver at Christies Beach.

Parliament of Australia
Preceded by Kym Richardson	Member for Kingston; 2007–present	Incumbent
Political offices
Preceded by Anne Ruston	Minister for Social Services; 2022–2025	Succeeded by Tanya Plibersek
Preceded by Bill Shorten	Minister for the National Disability Insurance Scheme; 2025	Succeeded by Mark Butler as Minister for Disability and the National Disability Insurance Scheme
Preceded by Murray Watt	Minister for Employment and Workplace Relations; 2025–present	Incumbent
