= Minister for Social Inclusion =

Australian government position between 2007 and 2013

Minister for Social Inclusion of Australia
- Style: The Honourable
- Appointer: Governor-General on the recommendation of the Prime Minister of Australia
- Inaugural holder: Julia Gillard
- Formation: 2007
- Final holder: Mark Butler
- Abolished: 1 July 2013

The Minister for Social Inclusion was a position that existed in the Australian government between 2007 and 2013. The position ceased to exist with the abolition of the role on 1 July 2013. While it existed, this role was part of the Prime Minister and Cabinet portfolio.

== List of Social Inclusion ministers ==
#	Minister	Party affiliation	Period
1	Julia Gillard	Australian Labor Party	2007–2010
2	Simon Crean	Australian Labor Party	2010
3	Tanya Plibersek	Australian Labor Party	2010–2011
4	Mark Butler	Australian Labor Party	2011–2013
