= Cheltenham, Victoria =

Cheltenham
- Suburb
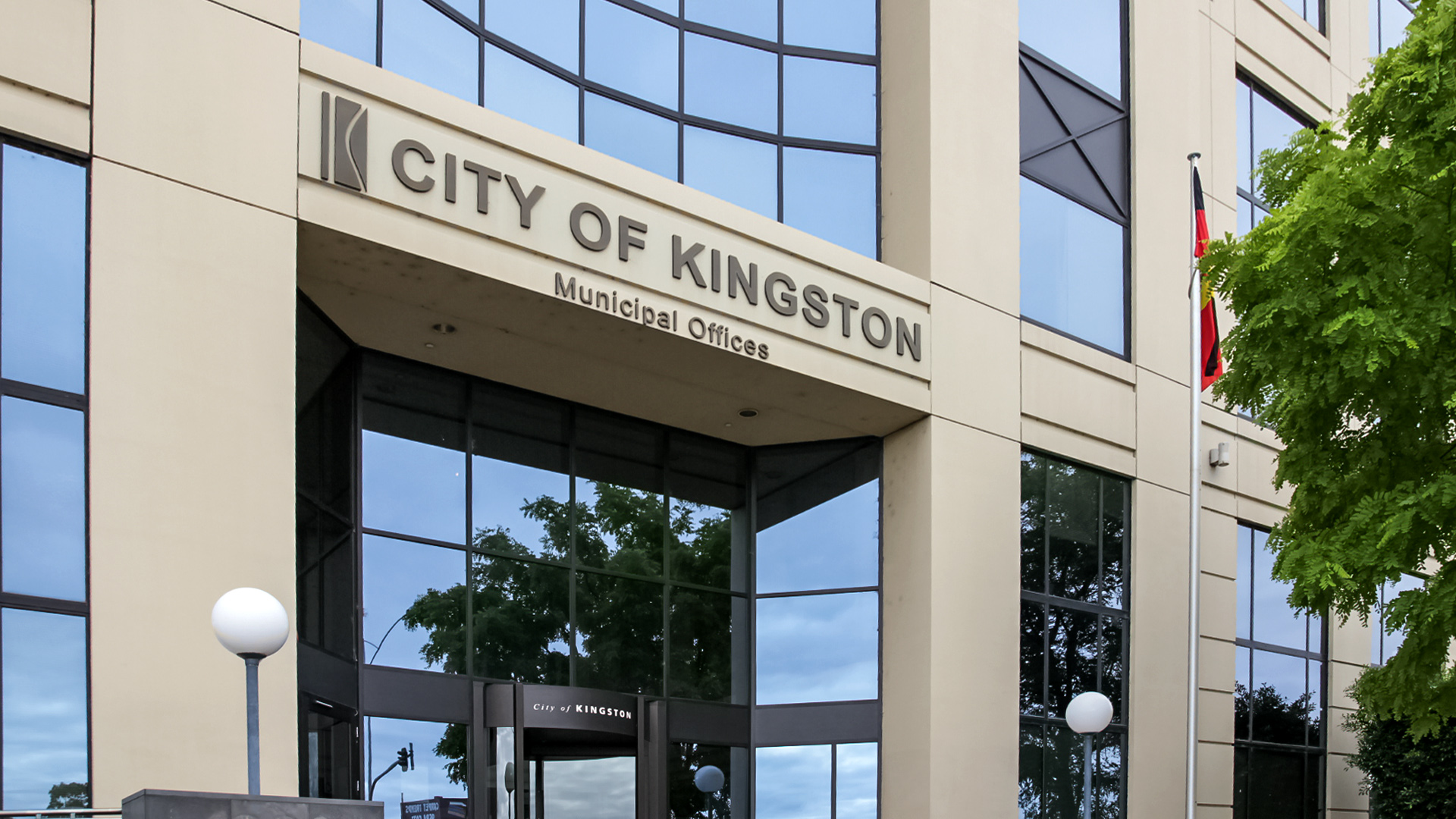
- The City of Kingston Headquarters on Nepean Highway, Cheltenham.

- Interactive map of Cheltenham
- Coordinates: 37.967°S 145.068°E
- Country: Australia
- State: Victoria
- City: Melbourne
- LGAs: City of Bayside; City of Kingston
- Location: 18 km (11 mi) from Melbourne
- Established: 1852

Government
  - State electorates: Clarinda; Bentleigh; Sandringham
  - Federal divisions: Goldstein; Isaacs

Area
  - Total: 10.1 km^{2} (3.9 sq mi)
- Elevation: 38 m (125 ft)

Population
  - Total: 23,992 (2021 census)
  - Density: 2,375/km^{2} (6,152/sq mi)
- Postcode: 3192
Suburbs around Cheltenham
Highett	Highett	Moorabbin
Sandringham	Cheltenham	Heatherton
Black Rock	Beaumaris	Mentone

Cheltenham is a suburb in Melbourne, Victoria, Australia, 18 km south-east of Melbourne's Central Business District, located within the Cities of Bayside and Kingston local government areas. Cheltenham recorded a population of 23,992 at the 2021 census.

The eastern side of the area's metropolitan railway line and Charman Road north is located within the City of Kingston, while the suburb's western region towards extensive golf links, parks and Port Phillip Bay falls within the City of Bayside. A significant feature in Cheltenham is Westfield Southland, a major shopping centre which opened in 1968.

Cheltenham is currently undergoing significant gentrification and urban development.

== History ==
The Boon Wurrung people had used natural springs in the area and when European settlers arrived they established market gardens and orchards nearby.

Cheltenham was one of the earliest areas to be settled in the parish of Moorabbin. It initially consisted of 625 acres of land purchased at auction by Josiah Morris Holloway on 11 May 1852. He subdivided this land into 370 allotments that were offered for sale in 1853. Many of the blocks were two acres in size and this gave the community its first name, Two Acre Village.

Lot 13 was purchased by Charles Whorrell for £20 and was located on the corner of Schnapper Point Road (Nepean Highway) and Centre Dandenong Road. On the allotment he built a hotel, the Cheltenham Inn, named after his home town in England, and a publican's license was granted in 1854. It was probably the first public building in the community and is believed to have given its name to the settlement. It later became a coffee palace before being demolished in the 1930s. Another pub, the Armagh Hotel (Royal Oak), had been built on Schnapper Point Road by 1856. A third pub, the Exchange Hotel (Tudor Inn) had been built nearby on the highway by January 1869. A fortnightly sale of livestock and produce took place behind the latter hotel by 1880.

Sufficient population had settled for a Post Office to open on 1 August 1857. The community had a medical practitioner by November 1857, Dr Richard Goldstone (1802–1888). A Mechanics' Institute was opened in January 1865, with a Temperance Hall attached that could accommodate 300 people.

Local government began with the creation of the Moorabbin Roads Board in 1862. This became the Moorabbin Shire Council in 1871. Which in turn became the City of Moorabbin in October 1934. This became the City of Kingston in 1994 following a program of municipal amalgamations initiated by the state government. Cheltenham is the largest suburb in the municipality in terms of size and population and it contains the seat of local government.

Cheltenham Park dates to 1872, and was used for cricket and other recreational activities. In all, Cheltenham contains 13 parks that make up 5.3% of the suburb.

The area experienced a spurt of growth in the 1880s after the Cheltenham railway station opened in 1881. A branch of the English, Scottish and Australian Bank opened in 1885. It was a substantial brick building on the corner of Nepean Highway and Goulburn St. It was still in use as a bank till the 1960s.

Much residential development occurred in the second half of the 1940s after World War II ended and this growth continued into the 1980s. The growing population of the area saw the construction of the Southland shopping centre on Nepean Highway in the mid 1960s. Cheltenham also has a large industrial area on the eastern edge and a smaller area at the far western edge. The western area is noted for Melbourne's only lift test shaft.

In 1993, the landmark 7-storey 1230 Nepean Highway office tower was built. The City of Kingston leased spaced within the building for use as its main office before purchasing it in 2010.

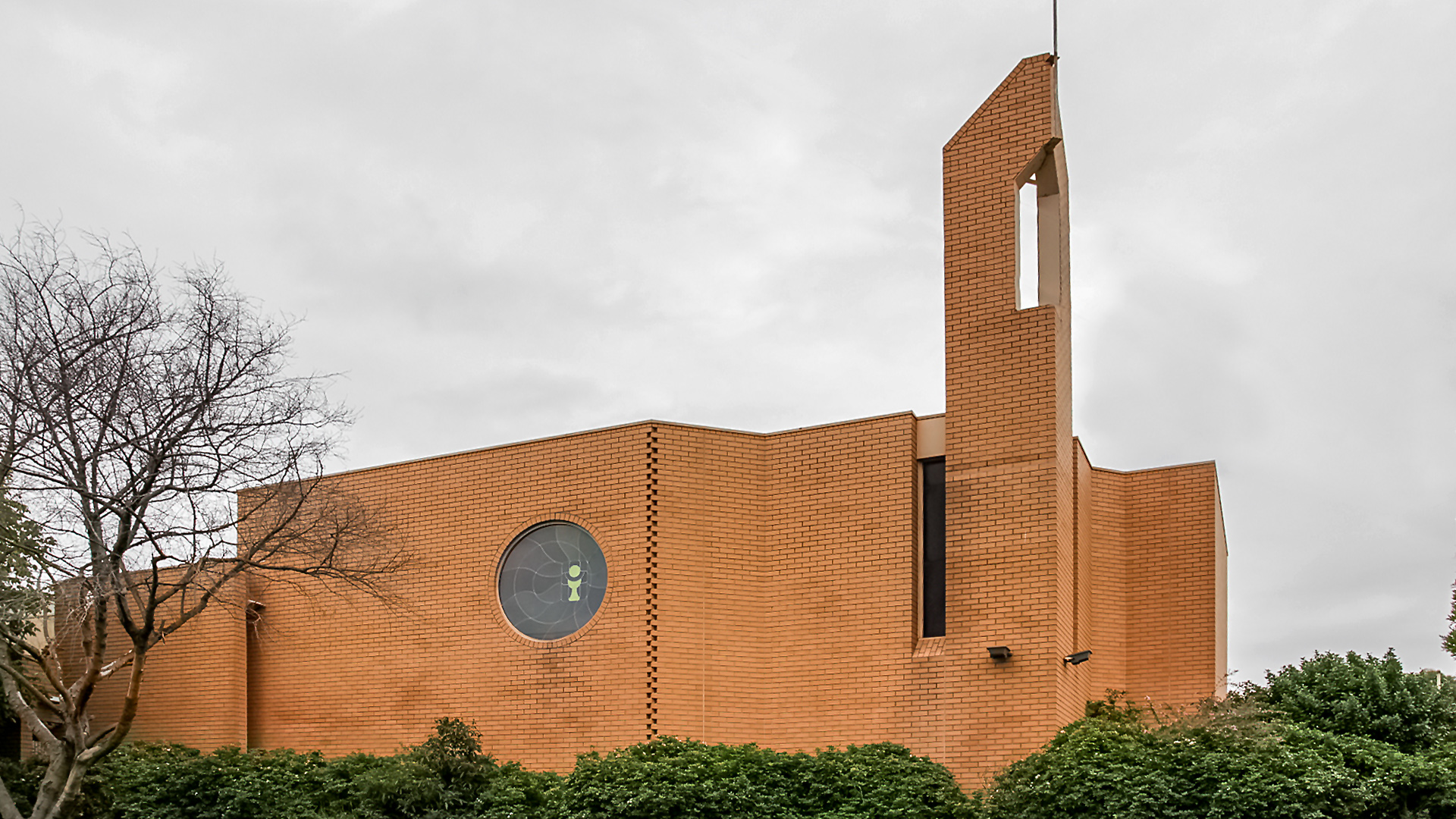
Cheltenham Catholic Church

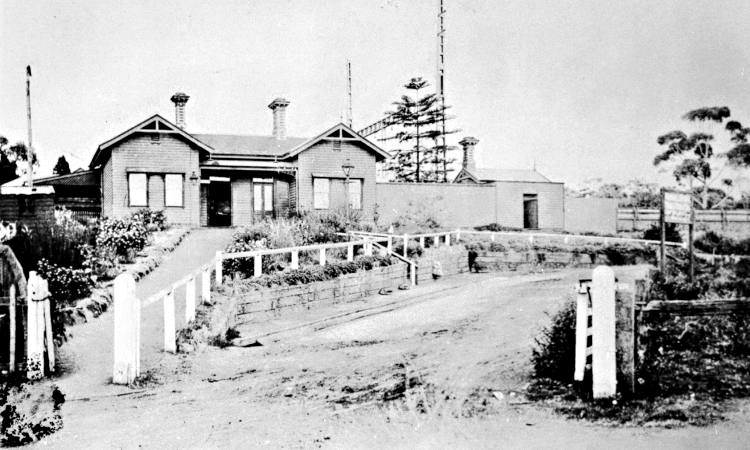
Cheltenham railway station in 1920

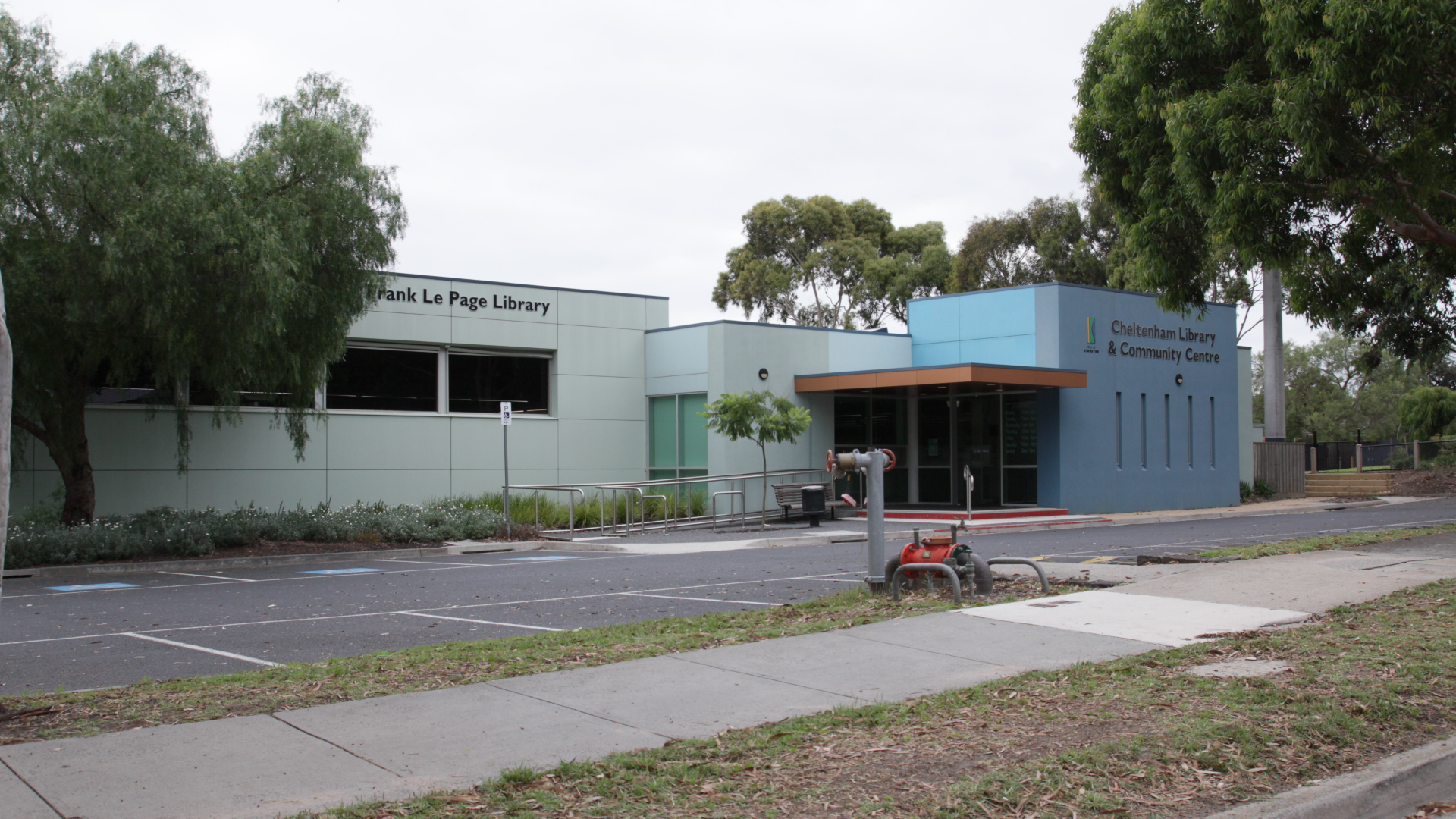
Cheltenham Library

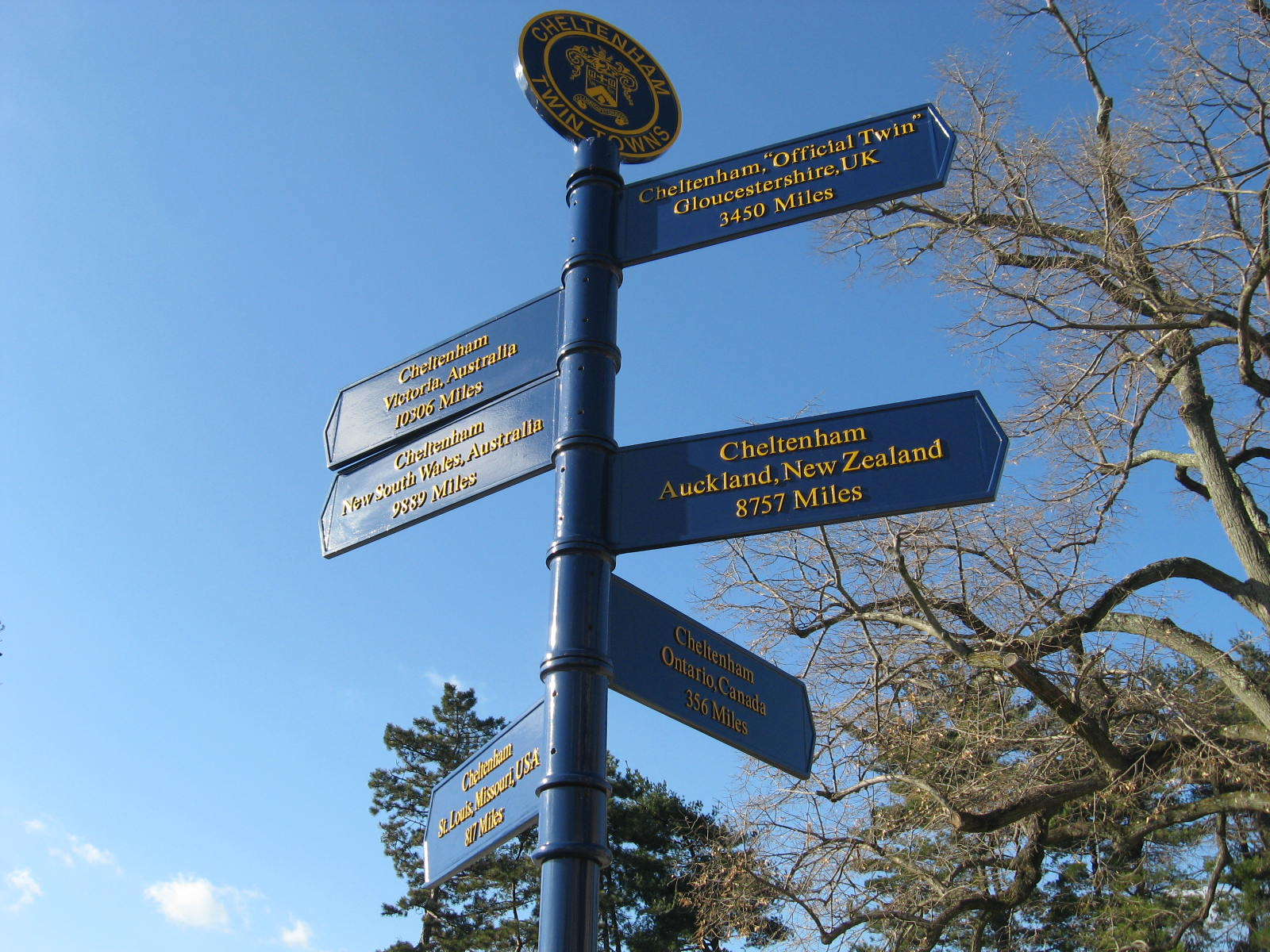
Twin towns sign in the United States

== Population ==
In the 2016 Census, there were 22,291 people in Cheltenham. 66.6% of people were born in Australia. The next most common countries of birth were England 3.9%, China 2.8%, India 2.2%, Greece 2.2% and New Zealand 1.6%. 72.4% of people spoke only English at home. Other languages spoken at home included Greek 4.8%, Mandarin 3.1%, Russian 1.7%, Italian 1.5% and Hindi 0.8%. The most common responses for religion were No Religion 34.2%, Catholic 23.6% and Anglican 10.3%.

== Health ==
The Kingston Centre is a large aged care and rehabilitation facility which opened on Warrigal Road, Cheltenham, in 1911 as the Melbourne Benevolent Asylum. It was known as the Cheltenham Home and Hospital for the Aged from 1965 through to 1970, before it was renamed to the Kingston Centre. The Heatherton Sanatorium with its entrance on Kingston Road (Heatherton, Victoria) is a now defunct sanatorium located behind the Kingston Centre and it operated for nearly 85 years, before it was closed in 1998.

In 2010, The Kingston Centre underwent a $46.3 million redevelopment, which was opened on 11 May 2012.

== Education ==
There are six schools in the suburb of Cheltenham; five of which focus on Primary education with the remaining one focusing on Secondary education. They are:

- Cheltenham Secondary College, (1959)
- Cheltenham Primary School, (1855)
- Cheltenham East Primary School, (1956)
- Le Page Primary School, (1994)
- Kingston Heath Primary School, (1976)
- Our Lady of the Assumption Parish Primary School, (1951)

Le Page Primary School was formed as a result of the merger of former primary schools Cheltenham Heights Primary School and Cheltenham North Primary School in 1994.

The Cheltenham Community and Education Centre is located at 8 Chesterville Road, Cheltenham. They offer English as a Second Language (ESL) classes, courses, childcare facilities and workshops.

== Sport ==
Cheltenham is home to sporting facilities and clubs. Sports played in the area include soccer, golf, cricket, Australian rules football, lawn bowls, hockey, baseball and swimming. There are a number of golf courses in Cheltenham; Cheltenham Golf Club on Victor Avenue which has nine holes however can be played as an eighteen-hole course from different tee boxes, Sandringham Municipal Golf Links on Cheltenham Road, and the Victoria Golf Club on Park Road

The suburb has two Australian Rules football teams. The Rosellas compete in the Southern Football League, as well as the Panthers who compete in the South Metro Junior Football League

Cheltenham Football and Cricket Clubs are based in Weatherall Road. The Cricket Club was established in 1872, originally in the Frankston-Glenhuntly Cricket Association, and migrating to the Federal District Cricket Association where the junior sides still play. The three senior sides now play in Cricket Southern Bayside. Kingston Heath Cricket Club plays at Kingston Heath and Southern Road Reserve in Mentone.

Bentleigh Greens Soccer Club's senior team play in the National Premier Leagues Victoria which is the top tier in Victoria. Their home ground is the Kingston Heath Soccer Complex.

Southern United Hockey Club and the Cheltenham Rustlers Baseball Club play at grounds at Kingston Heath Reserve.

== Shopping ==
Cheltenham is home to the shopping centre Westfield Southland, located in the northern part of the suburb. When it opened in 1968 it featured a small number of "anchor tenants", such as Myer and Woolworths, and dozens of smaller retailers, banks and cafes. Since its opening, the shopping centre has been continually expanded and renovated over the years. One such development was the construction of multi-level retail bridge across Nepean Highway linking to a newer three-level extension near the railway line. Southland now features up to 416 stores including 3 department stores, 3 discount department stores, 3 supermarkets, 3 electrical retailers and a 16 screen Village Cinemas Multiplex.

Many new retail outlets have popped up in Cheltenham in recent years, most notably DFO Moorabbin, which is located adjacent to Moorabbin Airport. DFO was originally built in 1992 as Fairways Market, and it is a large shopping centre that contains up to 135 stores, mainly fashion outlets.

Kingston Central Plaza, situated next to DFO, is also a new shopping precinct, which opened in 2008 and has 10 stores including: The Good Guys, Aldi and Sam's Warehouse.

Cheltenham Shopping centre is located in the centre of Cheltenham, on Charman Road. It is a large shopping strip that has a mixture of retail, residential buildings and offices.

A farmers market is held on the first Saturday of each month on parkland near the intersection of Nepean Highway and Bay Road.

== Places of worship ==
There are a number of religious organisations and places of worship in Cheltenham, including Anglican, Church of Christ, Uniting, Presbyterian, Roman Catholic and Pentecostal/Charismatic Christian churches.

== Cemeteries ==
The Cheltenham Pioneers Cemetery is located in Charman Road, next to the railway station, and was established in October 1864. The cemetery has many of Cheltenham's most distinguished inhabitants. There are also many memorials to some of Cheltenham's youngest inhabitants, such as the many unnamed babies from the nearby Children's Home (the site is now occupied by Westfield Southland Shopping centre) who died as a result of disease early in the 20th century.

Most burials now take place at the Cheltenham Memorial Park, located on Reserve Road, which was established in 1933.

== Transport ==
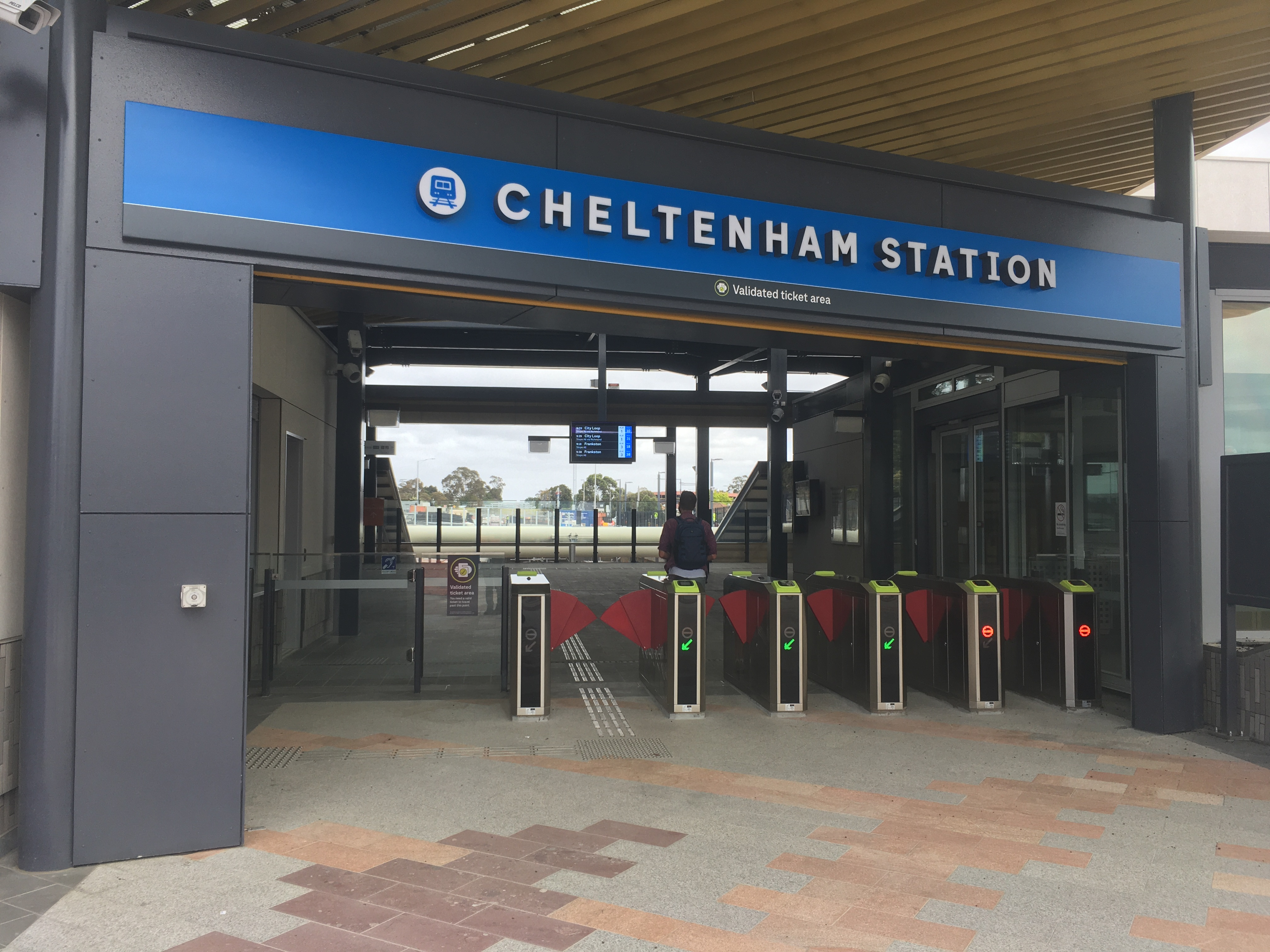
Cheltenham train station entrance

The suburb has been serviced by Cheltenham railway station since December 1881, which is located on the Frankston line, alongside Charman Road. In 2017 an additional railway station opened in Cheltenham's north; Southland railway station adjacent to the busy shopping centre of the same name, Westfield Southland shopping complex. Bus routes also service the suburb, mainly focusing on the large Westfield Southland Shopping centre complex, Warrigal Road (Highway) to the far east, Park Road to the north and Centre Dandenong Road around the suburb's geographic centre.

In 2020 the Victorian government completely rebuilt Cheltenham train station and removed two level crossings in the suburb.

Cheltenham is the starting point for the Suburban Rail Loop. The tunnelling for this underground rapid transit rail line is expected to start in 2026 and the first stage is due to be finished in 2035. The other end of the line terminates at Werribee.

== Library services ==
The Cheltenham branch of the City of Kingston Library is located 12 Stanley Avenue, Cheltenham.

== Activity Centres ==
Cheltenham is one of 82 higher order Major Activity Centres identified by the Melbourne 2030 growth planning policy. Although the growth planning policy was scrapped by the Victorian coalition government in April 2011, some elements of the policy still remain, including activity centres. Development of Cheltenham's Major Activity Centre, which is within 400m of Cheltenham railway station, is to be completed by 2030.

Southland is one of 28 Principal Activity Centre's located adjacent to the Highett Activity Centre and the Cheltenham Activity Centre. The activity centre's main focal point is Westfield Southland shopping complex.

Developments within the Cheltenham and Southland activity centres
Development	Description	Status
232-240 Charman Road	A 5–storey apartment complex, to comprise 51 dwellings and retail tenancies.	Proposed
7-21 Station Street	A 9–storey apartment complex, to comprise 57 dwellings and 8 serviced apartments.	Proposed
44-46 Station Street	A 7–storey apartment complex, to comprise 42 dwellings.	Proposed
Cheltenham Central refurbishment	Refurbishment of the three–level car park between Station Road, Cheltenham Plaza and Railway Road. Car park is to host a three-level apartment complex above the car park.	Proposed
Chester	A 6–storey apartment complex, to comprise 32 dwellings.	Proposed
The Point	A 6 to 8–storey commercial building planned as a "unique gateway" to the Activity Centre located on the Charman Road-Nepean Highway intersection.	Proposed
1261-1263 Nepean Highway	An 8–storey apartment complex, to comprise 90 dwellings.	Approved
Cheltenham railway station underground rail development	As part of the Andrews State Government's crossings removal project, Cheltenham station will be redeveloped into a rail trench – as to negate the rail crossings at Charman and Park roads. The 1.26 kilometres (0.78 miles)–long trench will be at least 30 metres wide; this will facilitate the reinstatement of Cheltenham's third track (currently in–use as a dock). Road bridges will be constructed over the rail-line for both Charman and Park roads. Furthermore, a multi–deck car-park will be built within the station's existing car–park.	Approved
11-19 Hall Street	A 4–storey apartment complex under construction, set to comprise 62 dwellings.	Under Construction
Barker Maude	A 4–storey apartment complex under construction, set to comprise 53 dwellings.	Under Construction
Ilixir	A 10–storey apartment complex on Railway Road. The entire complex will comprise 115 apartments and retail space. Construction on the A$60 million apartment project commenced in January 2016, with a completion date expected in Spring 2017.	Under Construction
The Village Cheltenham	The Village Cheltenham is an 8–storey apartment complex under construction adjacent to the Kingston Municipal Offices. Once built, the entire complex will comprise 190 apartments, offices, and a café.	Under Construction
Southland railway station	Southland station is a long-proposed railway station on the Frankston railway line. The State Government approved the station in 2014. Construction on the railway station commenced in August 2016.	Under Construction
157 Park Road	A 4–storey apartment complex located on 157 Park Road. The development was completed in 2013.	Completed
Cheltenham Plaza Road refurbishment	Refurbishment; new pedestrian safety; new toilet facilities; additional car spaces.	Completed
The Charman	The Charman is a 4–storey apartment complex that is located on Charman Road, adjacent to Nepean Highway. It was completed in 2014.	Completed
The Fore	The Fore is a 4–storey apartment complex that is located on Charman Road adjacent to Cheltenham Railway Station. It contains 43 apartments, and was completed in 2012.	Completed
Quest Cheltenham	The Quest Cheltenham apartment complex opened on 24 January 2011, with approximately 50 rooms, in 7–storeys (with two basement floors).	Completed

== Politics ==
In terms of state and federal government, Cheltenham is situated in the Electoral district of Clarinda, Bentleigh and Sandringham for state parliament and the Electoral district of Goldstein and Isaacs in the federal system.

In the 2018 and 2022 Victorian state elections and the 2019 Australian Federal election, every booth in Cheltenham reported a two-party majority of votes for the Labor Party.

=== State ===
Electoral district of Clarinda
Member	Party	Term
Hong Lim	Labor	2014–2018
Meng Heang Tak	Labor	2018–present

Electoral district of Bentleigh
Member	Party	Term
Nick Staikos	Labor	2014–present

Electoral district of Sandringham
Member	Party	Term
Sir Murray Porter	LCP	1955–1970
Sir Murray Porter	Liberal	1955–1970
Max Crellin	Liberal	1970–1982
Graham Ihlein	Labor	1982–1985
David Lea	Liberal	1985–1992
Murray Thompson	Liberal	1992–2018
Brad Rowswell	Liberal	2018-present

=== Federal ===
Division of Goldstein
Member	Party	Term
Ian Macphee	Liberal	1984–1990
David Kemp	Liberal	1990–2004
Andrew Robb	Liberal	2004–2016
Tim Wilson	Liberal	2016–2022
Zoe Daniel	Independent	2022-present

Division of Isaacs
Mark Dreyfus	Labor	2007–present

As of 2021, Cheltenham is split between 'Wattle Ward' 'Karkarook Ward' and 'Chicquita Ward' in the City of Kingston, currently represented by Jenna Davey-Burns, Hadi Saab and Tracey Davies.

Cheltenham, Victoria, is a "twin town" with six other Cheltenham's around the world:

- Cheltenham, England
- Cheltenham Township, Pennsylvania, United States
- Cheltenham, Ontario, Canada
- Cheltenham, St. Louis, Missouri, United States
- Cheltenham, New South Wales, Australia

== Notable residents ==
- Albert Allnutt – farmer and politician
- Vera Scantlebury Brown – medical practitioner
- James Cuthbertson – poet
- David Davies – artist
- Charles French – entomologist
- Sir William Fry – politician
- Hermann Herlitz – pastor
- Sir Robert Jackson – UN administrator
- Allan Jeans – football coach
- Henry Kane – schoolmaster
- Hattie Leckie – journalist
- Stella Power – soprano
- Joyce Vickery – botanist
- Bob Wilkie – footballer

== See also ==
- City of Moorabbin – Parts of Cheltenham were previously within this former local government area.
- City of Sandringham – Parts of Cheltenham were previously within this former local government area.
- Cheltenham Football Club
- Pennydale, Victoria - Neighbourhood of Cheltenham
