= Electoral results for the district of Sandringham =

Victoria, Australia, district election results

This is a list of electoral results for the Electoral district of Sandringham in Victorian state elections.

== Members for Sandringham ==
Member	Party	Term
(Sir) Murray Porter	LCP / Liberal	1955–1970
Max Crellin	Liberal	1970–1982
Graham Ihlein	Labor	1982–1985
David Lea	Liberal	1985–1992
Murray Thompson	Liberal	1992–2018
Brad Rowswell	Liberal	2018–present

== Election results ==
=== Elections in the 2020s ===
2022 Victorian state election: Sandringham
Party	Candidate	Votes	%	±%
Liberal	Brad Rowswell	18,783	46.4	+3.8
Labor	Bettina Prescott	10,426	25.7	−7.4
Greens	Alysia Regan	5,949	14.7	+6.5
Independent	Clarke Martin	2,800	6.9	−1.6
Animal Justice	Barbara Eppingstall	976	2.4	−0.8
Democratic Labour	Karla Zmegac	749	1.9	−1.0
Family First	Jill Chalmers	714	1.8	+1.8
Independent	Rodney Campbell	115	0.3	+0.3
Total formal votes		40,510	96.0	+0.8
Informal votes		1,701	4.0	−0.8
Turnout		42,211	91.2	+2.2
Two-party-preferred result
Liberal	Brad Rowswell	22,294	55.0	+4.6
Labor	Bettina Prescott	18,216	45.0	−4.6
Liberal hold		Swing	+4.6	

=== Elections in the 2010s ===
2018 Victorian state election: Sandringham
Party	Candidate	Votes	%	±%
Liberal	Brad Rowswell	16,770	42.70	−8.88
Labor	Anita Horvath	12,918	32.89	+8.52
Independent	Clarke Martin	3,317	8.45	−1.85
Greens	Dominic Phillips	3,201	8.15	−5.62
Animal Justice	Snezana Redford	1,310	3.34	+3.34
Democratic Labour	Liz Freeman	1,149	2.93	+2.93
Sustainable Australia	Creighton King	609	1.55	+1.55
Total formal votes		39,274	95.18	−1.29
Informal votes		1,990	4.82	+1.29
Turnout		41,264	91.66	−1.74
Two-party-preferred result
Liberal	Brad Rowswell	19,891	50.65	−6.69
Labor	Anita Horvath	19,383	49.35	+6.69
Liberal hold		Swing	−6.69	

2014 Victorian state election: Sandringham
Party	Candidate	Votes	%	±%
Liberal	Murray Thompson	19,264	51.6	−9.0
Labor	Christina Zigouras	9,103	24.4	+2.4
Greens	Adam McBeth	5,144	13.8	−2.0
Independent	Clarke Martin	3,840	10.3	+10.3
Total formal votes		37,351	96.5	+0.3
Informal votes		1,369	3.5	−0.3
Turnout		38,720	93.4	+3.0
Two-party-preferred result
Liberal	Murray Thompson	21,393	57.3	−8.2
Labor	Christina Zigouras	15,920	42.7	+8.2
Liberal hold		Swing	−8.2	

2010 Victorian state election: Sandringham
Party	Candidate	Votes	%	±%
Liberal	Murray Thompson	20,704	60.90	+8.27
Labor	Robbie Nyaguy	7,313	21.51	−7.85
Greens	Derek Wilson	5,430	15.97	+3.23
Family First	Malcolm Reid	548	1.61	−0.51
Total formal votes		33,995	96.28	−0.68
Informal votes		1,314	3.72	+0.68
Turnout		35,309	93.34	−0.08
Two-party-preferred result
Liberal	Murray Thompson	22,417	65.93	+7.25
Labor	Robbie Nyaguy	11,584	34.07	−7.25
Liberal hold		Swing	+7.25	

=== Elections in the 2000s ===
2006 Victorian state election: Sandringham
Party	Candidate	Votes	%	±%
Liberal	Murray Thompson	17,342	52.6	+3.6
Labor	Noel Pullen	9,676	29.4	−4.7
Greens	Bruce McPhate	4,197	12.7	−0.3
Independent	Sonia Castelli	1,037	3.1	+3.1
Family First	Stuart Campbell	700	2.1	+2.1
Total formal votes		32,952	97.0	−0.6
Informal votes		1,032	3.0	+0.6
Turnout		33,984	93.4	
Two-party-preferred result
Liberal	Murray Thompson	19,332	58.7	+5.7
Labor	Noel Pullen	13,615	41.3	−5.7
Liberal hold		Swing	+5.7	

2002 Victorian state election: Sandringham
Party	Candidate	Votes	%	±%
Liberal	Murray Thompson	16,036	49.0	−12.9
Labor	Justin Caruana	11,140	34.1	−3.6
Greens	Sam Watkins	4,265	13.0	+13.0
Independent	Nicholas Eden	1,264	3.9	+3.9
Total formal votes		32,705	97.6	+0.2
Informal votes		806	2.4	−0.2
Turnout		33,511	92.9	
Two-party-preferred result
Liberal	Murray Thompson	17,345	53.0	−9.1
Labor	Justin Caruana	15,360	47.0	+9.1
Liberal hold		Swing	−9.1	

=== Elections in the 1990s ===
1999 Victorian state election: Sandringham
Party	Candidate	Votes	%	±%
Liberal	Murray Thompson	19,478	62.5	−0.3
Labor	Janice Munt	11,693	37.5	+3.2
Total formal votes		31,171	97.4	−0.9
Informal votes		828	2.6	+0.9
Turnout		31,999	92.4	
Liberal hold		Swing	−1.8	

1996 Victorian state election: Sandringham
Party	Candidate	Votes	%	±%
Liberal	Murray Thompson	19,483	62.7	−2.9
Labor	Pauline Taylor	10,656	34.3	+9.1
Natural Law	Christine Savage	911	2.9	−6.2
Total formal votes		31,050	98.3	+1.2
Informal votes		530	1.7	−1.2
Turnout		31,580	93.6	
Two-party-preferred result
Liberal	Murray Thompson	19,945	64.3	−5.6
Labor	Pauline Taylor	11,064	35.7	+5.6
Liberal hold		Swing	−5.6	

1992 Victorian state election: Sandringham
Party	Candidate	Votes	%	±%
Liberal	Murray Thompson	20,069	65.6	+11.8
Labor	Roland Lindell	7,715	25.2	−17.8
Natural Law	Brian Gale	2,804	9.2	+9.2
Total formal votes		30,588	97.1	−0.4
Informal votes		907	2.9	+0.4
Turnout		31,495	94.8	
Two-party-preferred result
Liberal	Murray Thompson	21,342	69.9	+14.3
Labor	Roland Lindell	9,207	30.1	−14.3
Liberal hold		Swing	+14.3	

=== Elections in the 1980s ===
1988 Victorian state election: Sandringham
Party	Candidate	Votes	%	±%
Liberal	David Lea	14,476	54.78	−0.10
Labor	Ian Pugh	11,296	42.75	−2.37
Call to Australia	John Minty	652	2.47	+2.47
Total formal votes		26,424	97.53	−0.23
Informal votes		669	2.47	+0.23
Turnout		27,093	92.11	−0.66
Two-party-preferred result
Liberal	David Lea	14,891	56.36	+1.48
Labor	Ian Pugh	11,532	43.64	−1.48
Liberal hold		Swing	+1.48	

1985 Victorian state election: Sandringham
Party	Candidate	Votes	%	±%
Liberal	David Lea	15,330	54.9	+4.9
Labor	Ann Corcoran	12,603	45.1	+1.3
Total formal votes		27,933	97.8	
Informal votes		640	2.2	
Turnout		28,573	92.8	
Liberal gain from Labor		Swing	+2.3	

1982 Victorian state election: Sandringham
Party	Candidate	Votes	%	±%
Labor	Graham Ihlein	11,978	46.9	+4.5
Liberal	Max Crellin	11,354	44.5	−0.8
Democrats	Nathan Crafti	2,213	8.7	−3.5
Total formal votes		25,545	98.4	+0.3
Informal votes		421	1.6	−0.3
Turnout		25,966	94.5	+1.2
Two-party-preferred result
Labor	Graham Ihlein	13,169	51.5	+3.3
Liberal	Max Crellin	12,376	48.5	−3.3
Labor gain from Liberal		Swing	+3.3	

=== Elections in the 1970s ===
1979 Victorian state election: Sandringham
Party	Candidate	Votes	%	±%
Liberal	Max Crellin	11,638	45.3	−8.4
Labor	Neville Garner	10,892	42.4	+0.2
Democrats	Graeme Evans	3,142	12.2	+12.2
Total formal votes		25,672	98.1	−0.2
Informal votes		498	1.9	+0.2
Turnout		26,170	93.3	+0.9
Two-party-preferred result
Liberal	Max Crellin	13,304	51.6	−5.8
Labor	Neville Garner	12,368	48.2	+5.8
Liberal hold		Swing	−5.8	

1976 Victorian state election: Sandringham
Party	Candidate	Votes	%	±%
Liberal	Max Crellin	14,220	53.7	−0.5
Labor	Vivienne Brophy	11,177	42.2	+2.1
Democratic Labor	Salvatore Pinzone	1,069	4.0	−1.7
Total formal votes		26,466	98.3	
Informal votes		461	1.7	
Turnout		26,927	92.4	
Two-party-preferred result
Liberal	Max Crellin	15,182	57.4	−1.9
Labor	Vivienne Brophy	11,284	42.6	+1.9
Liberal hold		Swing	−1.9	

1973 Victorian state election: Sandringham
Party	Candidate	Votes	%	±%
Liberal	Max Crellin	14,871	58.3	+7.2
Labor	Margaret Graham	9,310	36.5	−1.8
Democratic Labor	William Leech	1,325	5.2	−5.5
Total formal votes		25,506	98.4	+0.3
Informal votes		403	1.6	−0.3
Turnout		25,909	92.5	−1.6
Two-party-preferred result
Liberal	Max Crellin	15,998	62.7	+1.6
Labor	Margaret Graham	9,508	37.3	−1.6
Liberal hold		Swing	+1.6	

1970 Victorian state election: Sandringham
Party	Candidate	Votes	%	±%
Liberal	Max Crellin	12,093	51.1	−2.9
Labor	Margaret Graham	9,061	38.3	+5.9
Democratic Labor	William Leech	2,522	10.6	−3.0
Total formal votes		23,676	98.1	+0.4
Informal votes		462	1.9	−0.4
Turnout		24,138	94.1	+0.6
Two-party-preferred result
Liberal	Max Crellin	14,237	60.1	−5.4
Labor	Margaret Graham	9,439	39.9	+5.4
Liberal hold		Swing	−5.4	

=== Elections in the 1960s ===
1967 Victorian state election: Sandringham
Party	Candidate	Votes	%	±%
Liberal	Murray Porter	12,515	54.0	−1.2
Labor	Kevin Vaughan	7,515	32.4	+1.1
Democratic Labor	William Leech	3,144	13.6	+1.2
Total formal votes		23,174	97.7	
Informal votes		548	2.3	
Turnout		23,722	93.5	
Two-party-preferred result
Liberal	Murray Porter	15,188	65.5	−0.7
Labor	Kevin Vaughan	7,986	34.5	+0.7
Liberal hold		Swing	−0.7	

1964 Victorian state election: Sandringham
Party	Candidate	Votes	%	±%
Liberal and Country	Murray Porter	13,488	52.2	+2.5
Labor	Russell Castley	8,732	33.8	−2.5
Democratic Labor	William Leech	3,124	12.1	−1.9
Communist	John O'Mara	474	1.8	+1.8
Total formal votes		25,818	98.4	−0.1
Informal votes		422	1.6	+0.1
Turnout		26,240	94.3	−1.4
Two-party-preferred result
Liberal and Country	Murray Porter	16,191	62.7	+0.2
Labor	Russell Castley	9,627	37.3	−0.2
Liberal and Country hold		Swing	+0.2	

1961 Victorian state election: Sandringham
Party	Candidate	Votes	%	±%
Liberal and Country	Murray Porter	12,563	49.7	−2.7
Labor	Kenneth Farrall	9,181	36.3	+0.9
Democratic Labor	John Ryan	3,532	14.0	+1.8
Total formal votes		25,276	98.5	−0.1
Informal votes		383	1.5	+0.1
Turnout		25,659	95.7	+1.7
Two-party-preferred result
Liberal and Country	Murray Porter	15,797	62.5	−0.2
Labor	Kenneth Farrall	9,479	37.5	+0.2
Liberal and Country hold		Swing	−0.2	

=== Elections in the 1950s ===
1958 Victorian state election: Sandringham
Party	Candidate	Votes	%	±%
Liberal and Country	Murray Porter	12,251	52.4	
Labor	Henry Fowler	8,292	35.4	
Democratic Labor	Thomas Ryan	2,856	12.2	
Total formal votes		23,399	98.6	
Informal votes		324	1.4	
Turnout		23,723	94.0	
Two-party-preferred result
Liberal and Country	Murray Porter	14,678	62.7	
Labor	Henry Fowler	8,721	37.3	
Liberal and Country hold		Swing		

1955 Victorian state election: Sandringham
Party	Candidate	Votes	%	±%
Liberal and Country	Murray Porter	13,120	47.1	
Labor	Henry Fowler	9,526	34.2	
Labor (A-C)	John Ryan	3,740	13.4	
Independent	Alexander Steele	1,437	5.2	
Total formal votes		27,823	98.2	
Informal votes		510	1.8	
Turnout		28,333	94.3	
Two-party-preferred result
Liberal and Country	Murray Porter	17,404	62.6	
Labor	Henry Fowler	10,419	37.4	
Liberal and Country hold		Swing		
