= Electoral results for the district of Clarinda =

Victoria, Australia, district election results

This is a list of electoral results for the district of Clarinda in Victorian state elections.

== Members for Clarinda ==
Member	Party	Term
Hong Lim	Labor	2014–2018
Meng Heang Tak	Labor	2018–present

== Election results ==
=== Elections in the 2020s ===
==== 2022 ====
2022 Victorian state election: Clarinda
Party	Candidate	Votes	%	±%
Labor	Meng Heang Tak	18,441	45.5	−9.1
Liberal	Anthony Richardson	11,593	28.6	+1.0
Greens	Jessamine Moffett	3,227	7.9	+0.9
Independent	Caroline White	3,167	7.8	+7.8
Family First	Karen Hastings	1,215	3.0	+3.0
Independent	Hung Vo	1,122	2.8	+0.0
Animal Justice	Sue Litchfield	1,005	2.5	+0.3
Freedom	Steve Wolfe	794	1.9	+1.9
Total formal votes		40,564	94.2	+0.8
Informal votes		2,477	5.8	−0.8
Turnout		43,041	88.8	−0.6
Two-party-preferred result
Labor	Meng Heang Tak	24,416	60.2	−4.7
Liberal	Anthony Richardson	16,148	39.8	+4.7
Labor hold		Swing	−4.7	

=== Elections in the 2010s ===
==== 2018 ====
2018 Victorian state election: Clarinda
Party	Candidate	Votes	%	±%
Labor	Meng Heang Tak	20,421	55.55	+2.28
Liberal	Gandhi Bevinakoppa	9,083	24.71	−4.43
Greens	Josh Fergeus	3,870	10.53	−0.76
Independent	Michael Gardner	1,829	4.98	+4.98
Transport Matters	Zhi Gang Zhuang	1,558	4.24	+4.24
Total formal votes		36,761	93.29	−0.57
Informal votes		2,644	6.71	+0.57
Turnout		39,405	88.63	−3.29
Two-party-preferred result
Labor	Meng Heang Tak	24,788	67.43	+1.58
Liberal	Gandhi Bevinakoppa	11,976	32.58	−1.58
Labor hold		Swing	+1.58	

==== 2014 ====
2014 Victorian state election: Clarinda
Party	Candidate	Votes	%	±%
Labor	Hong Lim	20,029	53.3	+1.0
Liberal	Gandhi Bevinakoppa	10,965	29.2	−4.1
Greens	James Talbot-Kamoen	4,239	11.3	+2.7
Rise Up Australia	Melanie Vassiliou	1,340	3.6	+3.6
Independent	James Marinis	1,034	2.7	+2.7
Total formal votes		37,700	93.9	−0.0
Informal votes		2,466	6.1	+0.0
Turnout		40,166	91.9	+0.4
Two-party-preferred result
Labor	Hong Lim	24,713	65.8	+3.4
Liberal	Gandhi Bevinakoppa	12,833	34.2	−3.4
Labor hold		Swing	+3.4	
