= Electoral results for the district of Clayton =

Australian district election results

This is a list of electoral results for the Electoral district of Clayton in Victorian state elections.

== Members for Clayton ==
Member	Party	Term
Gerard Vaughan	Labor	1985–1996
Hong Lim	Labor	1996–2014

== Election results ==
=== Elections in the 2010s ===
2010 Victorian state election: Clayton
Party	Candidate	Votes	%	±%
Labor	Hong Lim	15,843	54.34	−7.85
Liberal	Justin Scott	8,833	30.29	+6.54
Greens	Matthew Billman	2,782	9.54	+0.13
Democratic Labor	Peter Bolling	976	3.35	+3.35
Family First	Darren Reid	723	2.48	−0.90
Total formal votes		29,157	94.16	−0.08
Informal votes		1,808	5.84	+0.08
Turnout		30,965	91.50	−2.99
Two-party-preferred result
Labor	Hong Lim	19,071	65.31	−4.96
Liberal	Justin Scott	10,129	34.69	+4.96
Labor hold		Swing	−4.96	

=== Elections in the 2000s ===
2006 Victorian state election: Clayton
Party	Candidate	Votes	%	±%
Labor	Hong Lim	18,496	62.19	−4.23
Liberal	Michael Carty	7,064	23.75	+0.70
Greens	Siobhan Isherwood	2,798	9.41	+1.60
Family First	Emyr Aditya	1,006	3.38	+3.38
Citizens Electoral Council	Simon Hall	377	1.27	+1.27
Total formal votes		29,741	94.24	−1.44
Informal votes		1,818	5.76	+1.44
Turnout		31,559	94.49	+2.72
Two-party-preferred result
Labor	Hong Lim	20,884	70.27	−3.57
Liberal	Michael Carty	8,836	29.73	+3.57
Labor hold		Swing	−3.57	

2002 Victorian state election: Clayton
Party	Candidate	Votes	%	±%
Labor	Hong Lim	20,223	66.4	+4.7
Liberal	Andrew Wong	7,017	23.0	−14.9
Greens	George Kirby	2,377	7.8	+7.6
Democrats	Daniel Berk	831	2.7	+2.7
Total formal votes		30,448	95.7	+0.0
Informal votes		1,374	4.3	−0.0
Turnout		31,882	91.8	
Two-party-preferred result
Labor	Hong Lim	22,479	73.8	+11.9
Liberal	Andrew Wong	7,962	26.2	−11.9
Labor hold		Swing	+11.9	

=== Elections in the 1990s ===
1999 Victorian state election: Clayton
Party	Candidate	Votes	%	±%
Labor	Hong Lim	20,037	61.7	+2.1
Liberal	Collin Lok	12,441	38.3	−2.1
Total formal votes		32,478	95.6	−1.3
Informal votes		1,503	4.4	+1.3
Turnout		33,981	92.7	
Labor hold		Swing	+2.1	

1996 Victorian state election: Clayton
Party	Candidate	Votes	%	±%
Labor	Hong Lim	17,852	55.5	+4.0
Liberal	Norman Kennedy	12,346	38.4	+0.6
Independent	Eileen Blake-Lazarus	1,501	4.7	+4.7
Natural Law	Raymond Schlager	490	1.5	+1.5
Total formal votes		32,189	96.9	+3.6
Informal votes		1,042	3.1	−3.6
Turnout		33,231	93.6	
Two-party-preferred result
Labor	Hong Lim	19,141	59.6	+1.2
Liberal	Norman Kennedy	12,979	40.4	−1.2
Labor hold		Swing	+1.2	

1992 Victorian state election: Clayton
Party	Candidate	Votes	%	±%
Labor	Gerard Vaughan	15,377	51.5	−6.7
Liberal	George Emmanouil	11,285	37.8	+3.6
Independent	Sue Phillips	1,132	3.8	+3.8
Independent	Bryan Rogerson	907	3.0	+3.0
Independent	Philip Kelada	611	2.0	+2.0
Independent	Jimmy Emmanuel	558	1.9	+1.9
Total formal votes		29,870	93.3	+0.3
Informal votes		2,158	6.7	−0.3
Turnout		32,028	93.8	
Two-party-preferred result
Labor	Gerard Vaughan	17,391	58.4	−2.6
Liberal	George Emmanouil	12,400	41.6	+2.6
Labor hold		Swing	−2.6	

=== Elections in the 1980s ===
1988 Victorian state election: Clayton
Party	Candidate	Votes	%	±%
Labor	Gerard Vaughan	14,794	56.56	−3.27
Liberal	Lauris White	9,401	35.94	−4.23
Call to Australia	Daryl Esmore	1,482	5.67	+5.67
Independent	Stephen Bingle	477	1.82	+1.82
Total formal votes		26,154	94.36	−1.82
Informal votes		1,564	5.64	+1.82
Turnout		27,718	92.23	−1.73
Two-party-preferred result
Labor	Gerard Vaughan	15,412	58.94	−0.89
Liberal	Lauris White	10,737	41.06	+0.89
Labor hold		Swing	−0.89	

1985 Victorian state election: Clayton
Party	Candidate	Votes	%	±%
Labor	Gerard Vaughan	16,303	59.8	+1.2
Liberal	Alan Sandbach	10,945	40.2	+7.2
Total formal votes		27,248	96.2	
Informal votes		1,083	3.8	
Turnout		28,331	94.0	
Labor hold		Swing	−2.7	
