= Pennydale, Victoria =

Pennydale
- Coordinates: 37°57′36″S 145°2′46″E
- Country: Australia
- State: Victoria
- City: Melbourne
- LGA: City of Bayside
- Location: 17 km (11 mi) from Melbourne

Government
  - State electorate: Sandringham
  - Federal division: Goldstein

Population
  - Total: 2,462 (2016 census; only Pennydale population)
- Postcode: 3192
Localities around Pennydale
Highett	Highett	Highett
Cheltenham	Pennydale	Cheltenham
Cheltenham	Cheltenham	Cheltenham

Pennydale is a neighbourhood in the suburb of Cheltenham in Melbourne, Victoria, Australia, approximately 17 km south-east of the Melbourne central business district. It is entirely within the local government area of the City of Bayside.

== History ==
Pennydale is named after the Penny family who moved to the area in 1852, combined with the suffix dale meaning valley, as it was “sheltered by hills the same as in the old country”, referring to England. In particular the name recognises Edwin Thomas Penny (1848–1916), who migrated to Australia with his family at 4 years old. Penny was known for many community activities including:

- Running his family orchard and gardens
- Serving as shire President (1898-1899, 1899-1900)
- Serving as a council member (1896-1908)
- Occasionally preaching at Cheltenham Church of Christ and serving as superintendent of the sunday school
- Founding the Cheltenham Sons of Temperance
- Leasing the Brighton Beach Baths
- Serving as a justice of the peace at Cheltenham Court.

On the 9th of December 1916 Penny died unexpectedly. An official report stated the cause of death as shock, cardiac syncope, and internal ruptures. He was buried at Cheltenham Cemetery on the 11th of December. After his death, the name Pennydale continued in colloquial use.

The first official usage of Pennydale was in 1956 when the Pennydale Post Office opened in the Bay Road East Shopping Centre which was named to avoid confusion between the Cheltenham and the Highett Post Offices. The post office closed in 1999.

In 2006, an unnamed park in Olympic Avenue was named Pennydale Park by Bayside Council. In 2022, the Victorian State Government gazetted Pennydale as an official neighbourhood in Cheltenham.

== Education ==
Pennydale has one educational organisation which is the Olympic Avenue Kindergarten.

== Transport ==
Along its east border Pennydale is served by Southland railway station on the Frankston line. In 2018 the Labor State Government announced the Suburban Rail Loop with the first phase starting in Cheltenham and finishing in Box Hill. The new station will sit in Sir William Fry Reserve, adjacent to the north-eastern corner of Pennydale, with a planned opening in 2035.

Pennydale is served by bus route 822 (Chadstone Shopping Centre to Sandringham via Murrumbeena and Southland Shopping Centre), and route 828 (Hampton to Berwick Station via Southland Shopping Centre and Dandenong).

== Parks ==
Pennydale has two parks:

- Pennydale Park
- Tulip Grove Park

== See also ==
- Cheltenham, Victoria
- City of Bayside
