= Electoral results for the district of Glenhuntly =

Victoria, Australia, district election results

This is a list of electoral results for the electoral district of Glenhuntly in Victorian state elections.

== Members for Glenhuntly ==
Member	Party	Term
Joe Rafferty	Liberal	1967–1979
Gerard Vaughan	Labor	1979–1985

== Election results ==
=== Elections in the 1980s ===
1982 Victorian state election: Glenhuntly
Party	Candidate	Votes	%	±%
Labor	Gerard Vaughan	12,304	50.4	+4.3
Liberal	Peter Norman	10,326	42.3	−2.4
Democrats	Fred Ingamells	1,766	7.2	+7.2
Total formal votes		24,396	97.6	+0.6
Informal votes		590	2.4	−0.6
Turnout		24,986	93.1	0.0
Two-party-preferred result
Labor	Gerard Vaughan	13,319	54.6	+3.0
Liberal	Peter Norman	11,077	45.4	−3.0
Labor hold		Swing	+3.0	

=== Elections in the 1970s ===
1979 Victorian state election: Glenhuntly
Party	Candidate	Votes	%	±%
Labor	Gerard Vaughan	11,078	46.1	+4.8
Liberal	Charles Hider	10,751	44.7	−7.2
Australia	Gail Farrell	1,190	5.0	+5.0
Democratic Labor	John Mulholland	1,023	4.3	−2.9
Total formal votes		24,042	97.0	−0.5
Informal votes		734	3.0	+0.5
Turnout		24,776	93.1	+1.3
Two-party-preferred result
Labor	Gerard Vaughan	12,396	51.6	+9.7
Liberal	Charles Hider	11,646	48.4	−9.7
Labor gain from Liberal		Swing	+9.7	

1976 Victorian state election: Glenhuntly
Party	Candidate	Votes	%	±%
Liberal	Joe Rafferty	13,183	51.9	+2.4
Labor	Gerard Vaughan	10,487	41.3	+1.9
Democratic Labor	Terence Farrell	1,751	6.9	−0.8
Total formal votes		25,421	97.5	
Informal votes		658	2.5	
Turnout		26,079	91.8	
Two-party-preferred result
Liberal	Joe Rafferty	14,759	58.1	+0.2
Labor	Gerard Vaughan	10,662	41.9	−0.2
Liberal hold		Swing	+0.2	

1973 Victorian state election: Glenhuntly
Party	Candidate	Votes	%	±%
Liberal	Joe Rafferty	12,944	48.8	+3.4
Labor	Kathleen Foster	10,237	38.6	−1.0
Democratic Labor	Terence Farrell	2,232	8.4	−6.7
Australia	Richard Franklin	1,131	4.3	+4.3
Total formal votes		26,544	97.1	+0.6
Informal votes		793	2.9	−0.6
Turnout		27,337	92.9	−0.3
Two-party-preferred result
Liberal	Joe Rafferty	14,813	55.8	−0.3
Labor	Kathleen Foster	11,731	44.2	+0.3
Liberal hold		Swing	−0.3	

1970 Victorian state election: Glenhuntly
Party	Candidate	Votes	%	±%
Liberal	Joe Rafferty	11,342	45.4	−1.9
Labor	Anthony Miller	9,894	39.6	+1.2
Democratic Labor	Raymond Murphy	3,770	15.1	+0.8
Total formal votes		25,006	96.5	−0.7
Informal votes		897	3.5	+0.7
Turnout		25,903	93.2	−0.4
Two-party-preferred result
Liberal	Joe Rafferty	14,033	56.1	−4.0
Labor	Anthony Miller	10,973	43.9	+4.0
Liberal hold		Swing	−4.0	

=== Elections in the 1960s ===
1967 Victorian state election: Glenhuntly
Party	Candidate	Votes	%	±%
Liberal	Joe Rafferty	11,223	47.3	−4.1
Labor	Anthony Miller	9,108	38.4	+3.3
Democratic Labor	Raymond Studham	3,392	14.3	+0.9
Total formal votes		23,723	97.2	
Informal votes		678	2.8	
Turnout		24,401	93.6	
Two-party-preferred result
Liberal	Joe Rafferty	14,255	60.1	−2.8
Labor	Anthony Miller	9,468	39.9	+2.8
Liberal hold		Swing	−2.8	
