= David Lea =

David Lea may refer to:

- David Lea (Australian politician)
- David Lea, Baron Lea of Crondall, British trade unionist and politician
