= Lloyd O'Neil =

Lloyd O'Neil may refer to:

- Lloyd O'Neil (politician) (born 1937), Australian politician
- Lloyd O'Neil (publisher) (1928–1992), Australian publisher
