= List of mayors of Dandenong =

Mayor of Greater Dandenong
- Incumbent; Lana Formoso since 16 November 202
- Appointer: Greater Dandenong City Council
- Term length: 1 year
- Inaugural holder: Greg Harris
- Formation: March 1997
- Deputy: Richard Lim

This is a list of mayors of the City of Greater Dandenong, a local government area in Melbourne, Victoria, Australia. Before amalgamation in 1994, the Dandenong area was covered by the City of Dandenong and the City of Springvale (formerly known as the Shire of Dandenong).

The current mayor is Lana Formoso, who was voted into the position by councillors on 16 November 2023.

== Mayors ==
=== Greater Dandenong (1997–present) ===
No.	Portrait	Mayor (Ward)	Party	Term start	Term end
1		Greg Harris	Independent	March 1997	March 1998
2		Roz Blades	Labor	March 1998	March 1999
3		Naim Melhem	Labor	March 1999	March 2000
4		Angela Long	Labor	March 2000	March 2001
5		Youhorn Chea	Labor	March 2001	March 2002
6		Paul Donovan	Labor	March 2002	March 2003
7		Kevin Walsh	Independent	March 2003	16 March 2004
8		Clare O'Neil (Springvale South)	Labor	16 March 2004	November 2004 (Note: From 1996 until 2004, the annual election of the mayor for the following 12 months occurred in March. New legislation effective from 2004 onwards changed the date of the election of the mayor to November or December. There was a truncated transitional term of office from March to November 2004.)
9		Maria Sampey	Labor	November 2004	November 2005
10		Peter Brown	Labor	November 2005	November 2006
(5)		Youhorn Chea	Labor	November 2006	November 2007
11		John Kelly	Independent Liberal	November 2007	November 2008
12		Pinar Yesil	Labor	November 2008	November 2009
13		Jim Memeti	Labor	November 2009	November 2010
(2)		Roz Blades	Labor	November 2010	November 2011
(5)		Youhorn Chea	Labor	November 2011	7 November 2012
(4)		Angela Long	Labor	7 November 2012	November 2013
(13)		Jim Memeti	Labor	November 2013	November 2014
14		Sean O'Reilly	Labor	November 2014	November 2015
15		Meng Heang Tak (Paperback)	Labor	November 2015	November 2016
(13)		Jim Memeti	Labor	November 2016	November 2017
(5)		Youhorn Chea	Labor	November 2017	November 2018
(2)		Roz Blades	Labor	November 2018	14 October 2019
(5)		Youhorn Chea	Labor	14 October 2019	November 2019
(13)		Jim Memeti	Labor	November 2019	November 2020
(4)		Angela Long (Cleeland)	Labor	November 2020	11 November 2021
(13)		Jim Memeti (Dandenong)	Labor	11 November 2021	10 November 2022
16		Eden Foster (Yarraman)	Labor	10 November 2022	16 November 2023
17		Lana Formoso (Noble Park North)	Labor	16 November 2023	incumbent
