= Clare O'Neil =

Australian politician (born 1980)

The Honourable Clare O'Neil MP
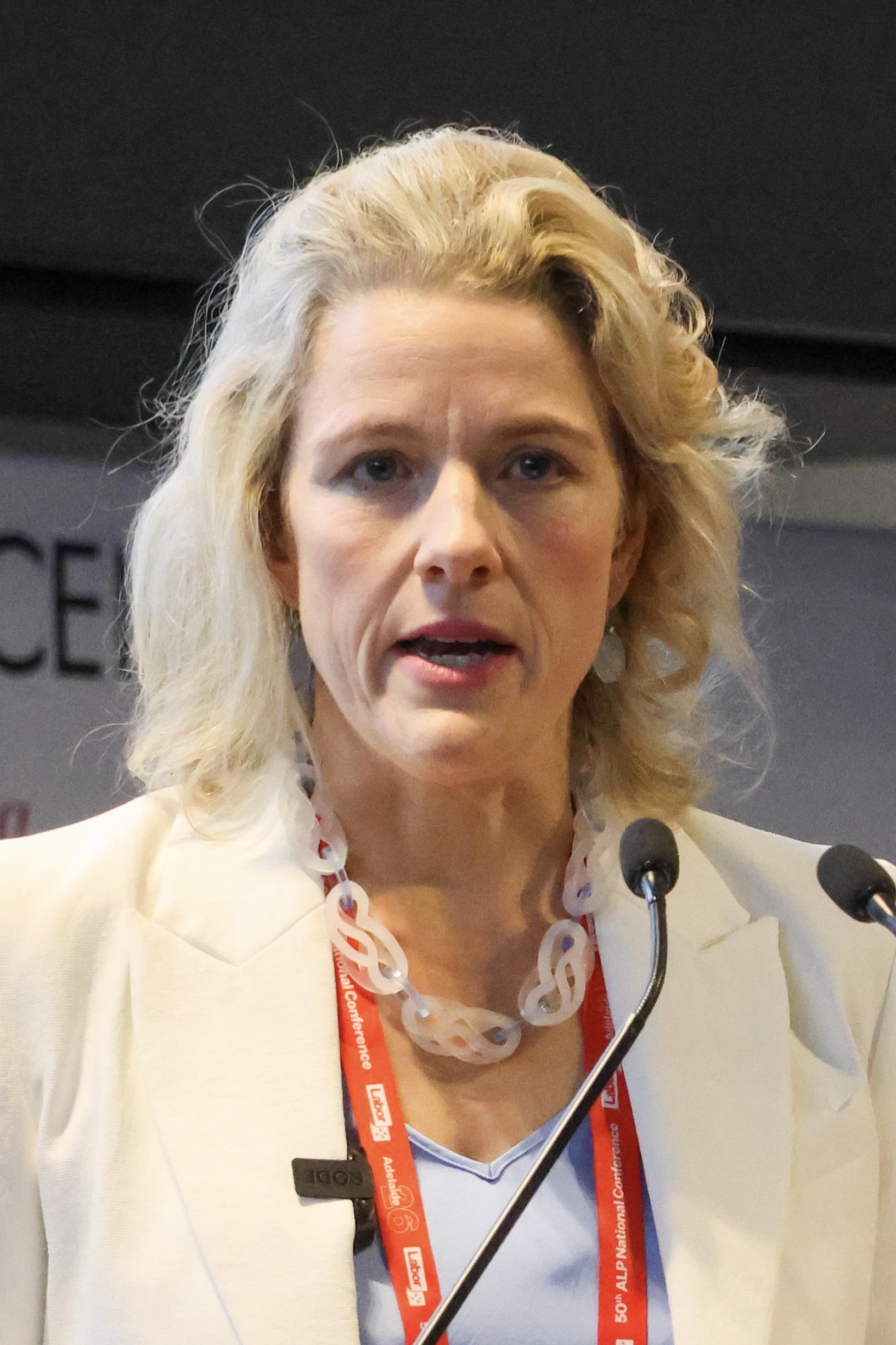
- O'Neil in 2026

Minister for Housing Minister for Homelessness
- Incumbent
- Assumed office 29 July 2024
- Prime Minister: Anthony Albanese
- Preceded by: Julie Collins

Minister for Cities
- Incumbent
- Assumed office 13 May 2025
- Prime Minister: Anthony Albanese
- Preceded by: Jenny McAllister

Minister for Home Affairs
- In office 1 June 2022 – 29 July 2024
- Prime Minister: Anthony Albanese
- Preceded by: Karen Andrews
- Succeeded by: Tony Burke

Minister for Cyber Security
- In office 1 June 2022 – 29 July 2024
- Prime Minister: Anthony Albanese
- Preceded by: Jane Hume (Digital Economy)
- Succeeded by: Tony Burke

Member of the Australian Parliament for Hotham
- Incumbent
- Assumed office 7 September 2013
- Preceded by: Simon Crean

Mayor of Greater Dandenong
- In office 16 March 2004 – November 2004
- Preceded by: Kevin Walsh
- Succeeded by: Maria Sampey

Personal details
- Born: Clare Ellen O'Neil; 12 September 1980 (age 46) Melbourne, Victoria, Australia
- Party: Labor
- Domestic partner: Brendan Munzel
- Relations: Lloyd O'Neil (Father)
- Education: Monash University; Harvard University
- Occupation: Politician
- Profession: Management consultant Politician
- Website: www.clareoneil.com

Clare Ellen O'Neil (born 12 September 1980) is an Australian politician who is the Minister for Housing and Minister for Homelessness since July 2024, Minister for Cities since May 2025 and was the Minister for Home Affairs and Minister for Cyber Security from June 2022 to July 2024. She is a member of the Australian Labor Party (ALP) and has been a member of the House of Representatives since 2013, representing the Victorian seat of Hotham.

O'Neil became mayor of the City of Greater Dandenong in 2004, aged 23, becoming the youngest female mayor in Australian history. Before entering federal parliament she worked as a manager at McKinsey & Company. O'Neil was elected to parliament at the 2013 federal election. In 2016, she was appointed as a shadow minister by opposition leader Bill Shorten. She continued in the shadow ministry after Anthony Albanese succeeded Shorten as ALP leader in 2019.

== Early life ==
O'Neil was born in Melbourne, Australia in 1980, the daughter of prolific Australian publishers Lloyd O'Neil and Anne O'Donovan. She undertook her VCE at Loreto Mandeville Hall in Toorak, where she later served on the school council. She then undertook further education at Monash University, studying a Bachelor of Arts (History), and then a Bachelor of Laws, graduating with honours in both fields. In 2006, she was awarded a Fulbright Scholarship to undertake a Master of Public Policy at Harvard University's John F. Kennedy School of Government.

== Early career ==
O'Neil joined the Australian Labor Party at 16 and soon met Simon Crean, former party leader and her predecessor as the member for the division of Hotham. In her maiden speech, she described Crean as one of her "Labor heroes" and "a person in whose footsteps I am honoured to walk".

In March 2003, O'Neil ran as a candidate for Springvale South Ward on the City of Greater Dandenong and was subsequently elected. After one year in the position, she was also elected by fellow councillors as mayor, becoming the youngest female mayor of a local government area in Australian history.

In 2007, while studying in the United States, O'Neil worked as an intern on the New York Stock Exchange; and in 2008 returned to Australia to serve briefly as an adviser to the Office of the Commonwealth Treasurer. She later worked at management consulting firm McKinsey & Company from 2009 to 2013 as an engagement manager.

== Political career ==
O'Neil was endorsed as a late replacement candidate for the Australian Labor Party in Hotham at the 2013 Australian federal election, following the disendorsement of her friend Geoff Lake. She retained the seat for Labor and was quickly flagged by political commentator Peter van Onselen as a future front bencher.

O'Neil is a member of the Labor Right faction. From 2013 to 2016, she served on the House of Representatives standing committees on Agriculture and Industry and Tax and Revenue. Following the 2016 election, O'Neil was appointed to the shadow ministry under opposition leader Bill Shorten, becoming Shadow Minister for Justice. She was additionally made Shadow Minister for Financial Services in June 2018. After Labor lost the 2019 election, O'Neil considered standing for the deputy leadership of the party, but subsequently announced that she did not have enough support from her colleagues and would not contest the position. ABC News reported that she was persuaded to drop out in order to make way for fellow Victorian Right MP Richard Marles.

In 2022, O'Neil was appointed as Minister for Home Affairs and Cyber Security, being the first Cabinet Minister responsible for Cyber Security.

In 2024, O'Neil was removed from her role as Minister for Home Affairs and Cyber Security, and was moved to the portfolio of Minister for Housing and Homelessness.

Following the 2025 Australian federal election in which the Labor government was re-elected, O'Neil retained the portfolios of Housing and Homelessness, and was appointed Minister for Cities in the second Albanese ministry.

=== Cabinet minister ===
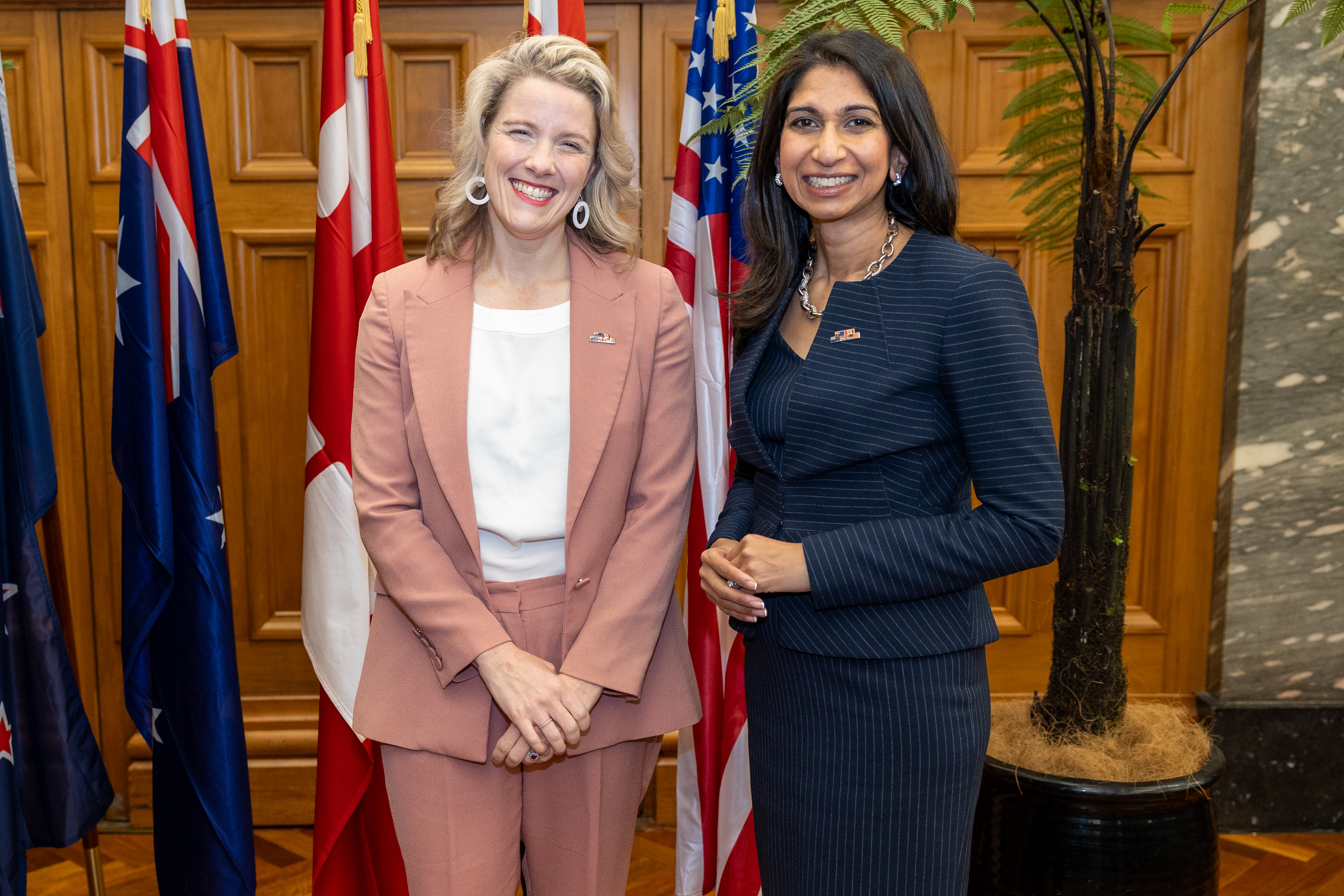
O'Neil with UK Home Secretary Suella Braverman in Wellington in June 2023

O'Neil has stated that Home Affairs must evolve to protect Australia's domestic security. As Minister for Home Affairs and Minister for Cyber Security, O'Neil's focuses include improving Australia's response to natural disasters from climate change, improving Australia's cyber security, countering foreign interference, reforming Australia's migration system, national resilience and strengthening Australia's democracy. She has stated that Australia's migration system is broken and is not serving the needs of Australia, business or migrants. On 2 September 2022, she announced a comprehensive review of Australia's migration system to address existing challenges and set a new direction for the coming decades. This review is scheduled to report their results in early 2023.

In O'Neil's first six months as Minister for Cyber Security, Australia was subject to the Optus and Medibank cyber attacks which were at the time Australia's largest cyber attacks in Australia's history, within three weeks of each other. As a result, from these cyber attacks, a new joint task force was created to "hack the hackers" and disrupt cyber attacks in Australia before they were committed. O'Neil has announced a comprehensive review of the Optus and Medibank cyber attacks to look at how Home Affairs can learn from these cyber attacks and what policy reform needs to be done. She has appointed a new expert advisory board to develop a new Cyber Security Strategy to improve Australia's national resilience to cyber threats and properly address the consequences of cyber incidents. O'Neil was praised for leading the Albanese Government's response to the Optus and Medibank cyber attacks and her efforts to reform cyber security in Australia. She was named 2022 Cybersecurity Person Of The Year by CyberCrime Magazine.

In March 2024, O'Neil was criticised for allegedly verbally abusing the secretary of her department, causing the secretary to leave her office in tears.

In May 2024, O'Neill faced calls to resign following the bashing of an elderly woman by a detainee released from immigration detention.

=== Political positions ===
In a 2013 interview with Michelle Grattan, O'Neil nominated four key areas as priorities for her in politics: economics, child welfare, women's issues, and the welfare of Indigenous Australians. She has also spoken on issues such as human rights violations in Cambodia, primary, secondary, and higher education, asylum seeker policy, and Australian Labor Party reform.

==== Economics ====
In her maiden speech, O'Neil placed an emphasis on the importance of a strong economy in effecting a fair society and stemming disadvantage. She stated that while she believed "government should not be building great tariff walls or controlling the big macroeconomic levers", it did in practice provide "the platform on which our businesses compete – and win – globally" and that political leaders must therefore play a role in providing "good policy and clear communication" on the topic. O'Neil cites her family's history, work at McKinsey & Company, and experiences in indigenous communities as influential in shaping her views on the economy. O'Neil's economic judgement was called into question by international education sector peak bodies in 2024, where they described her management of the immigration system as 'causing severe economic damage, including loss of jobs, which could push Australia towards recession.'

==== Indigenous Australians ====
In 2011, O'Neil spent nine months living with her partner in North East Arnhem Land, one of the northernmost regions of the Northern Territory, fostering a child and assisting local women to establish small businesses. During her time in the region, she witnessed crises in health, housing, and employment; and she has since spoken in Parliament on her desire to see action taken to resolve them: "For many decades politicians have said it is shameful. I want my generation to be the last to have to say it."

== Personal life ==
O'Neil lives with her partner Brendan, a medical practitioner who has completed further studies in psychology. O'Neil has two sons and a daughter. While living in the Northern Territory, O'Neil and her partner also cared for a child as foster parents.

O'Neil previously lived in East Melbourne, outside her electorate, but bought a house in Oakleigh in 2020.

Parliament of Australia
Preceded by Simon Crean	Member for Hotham; 2013–present	Incumbent
Political offices
Preceded by Karen Andrews	Minister for Home Affairs; 2022–2024	Succeeded by Tony Burke
Preceded by Jane Hume	Minister for Cyber Security; 2022–2024	Succeeded by Tony Burke
Preceded by Julie Collins	Minister for Housing; 2024–present	Incumbent
Preceded by Julie Collins	Minister for Homelessness; 2024–present	Incumbent
Preceded by Jenny McAllister	Minister for Cities; 2025−present	Incumbent
