= Minister for Homelessness =

Australian cabinet position

- Commonwealth Coat of Arms

- Flag of Australia

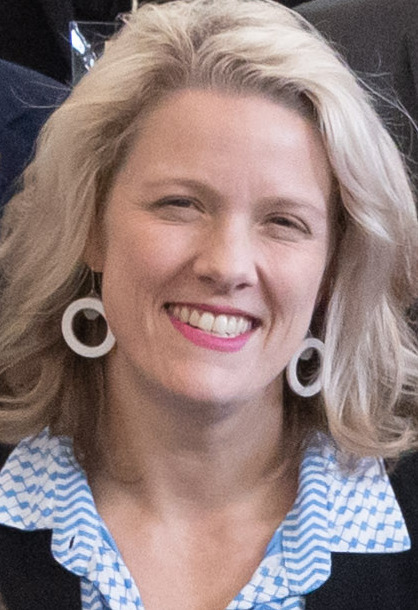
- Incumbent; Clare O'Neil since 29 July 2024
- Department of the Treasury
- Style: The Honourable
- Appointer: Governor-General on the recommendation of the Prime Minister of Australia
- Inaugural holder: Mark Arbib (as Minister for Social Housing and Homelessness)
- Formation: 14 September 2010
- Website: ministers.treasury.gov.au/ministers/clare-oneil-2025

The Minister for Homelessness is an Australian Government cabinet position which is currently held by Clare O'Neil since July 2024.

In the Government of Australia, the minister administers this portfolio through the Department of the Treasury.

The ministry was an outer ministry when it was created in 2010. It was elevated to the cabinet during the first Albanese ministry and remained there in the second Albanese ministry.

Between 2010 and 2013 and since 2020, the minister appointed to the position is also appointed the Minister for Housing.

== List of ministers for homelessness ==
The following individuals have been appointed as Minister for Homelessness, or any of its precedent titles:

Order	Minister	Party	Prime Minister	Title	Term start	Term end	Term in office
1	Mark Arbib	Labor	Gillard	Minister for Social Housing and Homelessness	14 September 2010	14 December 2011	1 year, 91 days
2	Robert McClelland	Labor	Gillard	Minister for Homelessness	14 December 2011	5 March 2012	82 days
3	Brendan O'Connor	Labor	Gillard	Minister for Homelessness	5 March 2012	4 February 2013	336 days
4	Mark Butler	Labor	Gillard	Minister for Housing and Homelessness	4 February 2013	1 July 2013	147 days
5	Julie Collins	Labor	Rudd	Minister for Housing and Homelessness	1 July 2013	18 September 2013	79 days
6	Michael Sukkar	Liberal	Morrison	Minister for Homelessness, Social and Community Housing	22 December 2020	23 May 2022	1 year, 152 days
(5)	Julie Collins	Labor	Albanese	Minister for Homelessness	1 June 2022	29 July 2024	2 years, 58 days
7	Clare O'Neil	Labor	Albanese	Minister for Homelessness	29 July 2024	Incumbent	2 years, 40 days

== List of assistant ministers for homelessness ==
The following individuals have been appointed as Assistant Ministers for Homelessness, or any of its precedent titles:

Order	Minister	Party	Prime Minister	Title	Term start	Term end	Term in office
1	Melissa Parke	Labor	Gillard	Parliamentary Secretary for Homelessness and Social Housing	4 February 2013	1 July 2013	147 days
2	Doug Cameron	Labor	Rudd	Parliamentary Secretary for Homelessness and Social Housing	1 July 2013	18 September 2013	79 days
3	Luke Howarth	Liberal National	Morrison	Assistant Minister for Community Housing, Homelessness and Community Services	29 May 2019	22 December 2020	1 year, 207 days
