= Electoral district of Clarinda =

State electoral district of Victoria, Australia

Coordinates: 37.941°S 145.117°E

Clarinda Victoria—Legislative Assembly
- Interactive map of electoral district boundaries from the 2022 state election
- State: Victoria
- Created: 2014
- MP: Meng Heang Tak
- Party: Labor
- Namesake: Clarinda
- Electors: 44,462 (2018)
- Area: 45 km^{2} (17.4 sq mi)
- Demographic: Metropolitan

The electoral district of Clarinda is an electoral district of the Victorian Legislative Assembly in Australia. It was created for the 2014 state election and is represented by Meng Heang Tak for the Labor Party.

It largely covers the area of the abolished district of Clayton, covering south east suburbs in Melbourne. It includes all or parts of the suburbs of Clarinda, Clayton, Springvale, Heatherton, Mentone, Dingley Village and Cheltenham.

== Members for Clarinda ==
Member	Party	Term
Hong Lim	Labor	2014–2018
Meng Heang Tak	Labor	2018–present

== Election results ==
2022 Victorian state election: Clarinda
Party	Candidate	Votes	%	±%
Labor	Meng Heang Tak	18,441	45.5	−9.1
Liberal	Anthony Richardson	11,593	28.6	+1.0
Greens	Jessamine Moffett	3,227	7.9	+0.9
Independent	Caroline White	3,167	7.8	+7.8
Family First	Karen Hastings	1,215	3.0	+3.0
Independent	Hung Vo	1,122	2.8	+0.0
Animal Justice	Sue Litchfield	1,005	2.5	+0.3
Freedom	Steve Wolfe	794	1.9	+1.9
Total formal votes		40,564	94.2	+0.8
Informal votes		2,477	5.8	−0.8
Turnout		43,041	88.8	−0.6
Two-party-preferred result
Labor	Meng Heang Tak	24,416	60.2	−4.7
Liberal	Anthony Richardson	16,148	39.8	+4.7
Labor hold		Swing	−4.7	

Two-party-preferred vote results in Clarinda View source data.
