= Lloyd O'Neil (publisher) =

Australian publisher

Lloyd O'Neil AM
- Born: 17 July 1928; Melbourne, Victoria, Australia
- Died: 27 February 1992 (aged 63); Hawthorn, Victoria, Australia
- Education: Caulfield Grammar School
- Known for: Book publisher
- Spouses: Janet Twigg-Patterson (m. 1953; div. 1978) Anne O'Donovan (m. 1979)
- Relatives: Clare O'Neil (daughter)

Lloyd John O'Neil AM (17 July 1928 – 27 February 1992) was an Australian publisher. He was involved with a number of different publishing firms and imprints during his career. He served as president of the Australian Book Publishers Association from 1969 to 1971.

== Early life and education ==
Lloyd John O'Neil was born in Melbourne on 17 July 1928, the son of Eunice Ellen (née Lloyd) and Louis Joseph O'Neil. His father was a wool classer and his mother was a professional pianist. He attended Caulfield Grammar School until 1944.

== Career ==
After leaving school, O'Neil moved to Sydney and began working with Angus & Robertson as a buyer, becoming head of art books. He left Angus & Robertson in 1951 and the following year joined Cassell as a travelling salesman. Settling in Brisbane, in 1955 he was recruited by bookseller Brian Clouston to run schoolbook publisher Jacaranda Press. He left Jacaranda in 1959 and moved back to Melbourne to establish his own company, Lansdowne Press.

O'Neil sold Lansdowne Press to F. W. Cheshire in 1963 and took up a management position. He was one of the first Australian publishers to print books offshore, which significantly reduced printing costs. Cheshire was in turn sold in 1964 to a joint venture between the British firm IPC and Australian printing firm Wilke and Co. Ltd. O'Neil succeeded Cheshire's founder Frank Cheshire as general manager in 1967.

In December 1967, O'Neil was appointed by the McEwen government as deputy chairman of the newly created National Literature Board of Review, to advise the Minister for Customs and Excise on literary censorship. He remained on the board of review until 1976 and was also president of the Australian Book Publishers Association (ABPA) from 1969 to 1971.

O'Neil resigned from Cheshire in 1969. He subsequently established Lloyd O'Neil Pty Ltd, which initially partnered with Golden Press and Rigby Ltd to make use of their distribution networks. He printed a wide range of titles, including an Australian Women's Weekly cookbook, a popular road atlas, a travel guide, a birdwatching guide, and an educational series. In partnership with John Currey, O'Neil printed new editions of a number of out-of-print Australian titles. He reportedly published "more than 1000 Australian titles" during his career.

In 1987, O'Neil sold his company to Penguin Books Australia. He subsequently joined Penguin's board and was given control of a new imprint, Viking O'Neil.

== Personal life ==
O'Neil married Janet Twigg-Patterson in 1953, with whom he had four daughters. The couple separated in 1973 and divorced in 1978. The following year, he married fellow publisher Anne O'Donovan, with whom he had a son and a daughter. His youngest child Clare O'Neil was elected to federal parliament in 2013, while another daughter Helen O'Neil has served as executive director of the Council for the Humanities, Arts and Social Sciences and on the board of the Film Finance Corporation Australia.

== Death and legacy ==
O'Neil was diagnosed with bowel cancer in 1987. He was appointed Member of the Order of Australia (AM) in 1991 and died on 27 February 1992 at the age of 63.

Following his death, the ABPA established the Lloyd O'Neil Award in his honour, later presented at the Australian Book Industry Awards, for "exceptional long service to the industry".
