= Electoral district of Clayton =

State electoral district of Victoria, Australia

Clayton Victoria—Legislative Assembly
- State: Victoria
- Created: 1985
- Abolished: 2014
- Electors: 33,843 (2010)
- Area: 38 km^{2} (14.7 sq mi)
- Demographic: Metropolitan

The Electoral district of Clayton is a former electoral district of the Victorian Legislative Assembly. It was named for the Melbourne suburb of Clayton, and also includes Clarinda, Notting Hill as well as parts of surrounding suburbs.

It was created by the redistribution that abolished malapportionment in the Victorian Legislative Assembly prior to the 1985 election, and was always a safe Labor seat. Clayton was abolished in 2014 following a redistribution of Victoria's electoral boundaries. Much of Clayton's territory is in the new district of Clarinda.

== Members for Clayton ==
Member	Party	Term
Gerard Vaughan	Labor	1985–1996
Hong Lim	Labor	1996–2014

== Election results ==
2010 Victorian state election: Clayton
Party	Candidate	Votes	%	±%
Labor	Hong Lim	15,843	54.34	−7.85
Liberal	Justin Scott	8,833	30.29	+6.54
Greens	Matthew Billman	2,782	9.54	+0.13
Democratic Labor	Peter Bolling	976	3.35	+3.35
Family First	Darren Reid	723	2.48	−0.90
Total formal votes		29,157	94.16	−0.08
Informal votes		1,808	5.84	+0.08
Turnout		30,965	91.50	−2.99
Two-party-preferred result
Labor	Hong Lim	19,071	65.31	−4.96
Liberal	Justin Scott	10,129	34.69	+4.96
Labor hold		Swing	−4.96	

== See also ==
- Parliaments of the Australian states and territories
- List of members of the Victorian Legislative Assembly
