= Murray Porter =

Australian politician

Sir Murray Victor Porter (20 December 1909 – 16 January 1993) was an Australian politician.

Porter was born in Albert Park to pharmacist Victor George Porter and Hilda May Manson. He attended Brighton Grammar School and became an assurance officer, rising to an executive position with the National Mutual Life Insurance Company in 1928. On 22 April 1933, he married Edith Alice Johnston, with whom he had two daughters. He served in New Guinea during World War II, and was a member of the Liberal and Country Party.

In 1955 he was elected to the Victorian Legislative Assembly as the member for Sandringham. He was government whip from 1955 to 1956, a minister without portfolio from 1956 to 1958, Minister for Forests from 1958 to 1959, Minister for Local Government from 1958 to 1964, and Minister for Public Works from 1964 to 1970, when he resigned to become Agent-General in London. He was knighted in 1970 and remained in London until 1976. Porter died in 1993.

Victorian Legislative Assembly
New seat	Member for Sandringham; 1958–1970	Succeeded by Max Crellin
