= Murray Thompson =

Australian rules footballer

Murray Thompson OAM
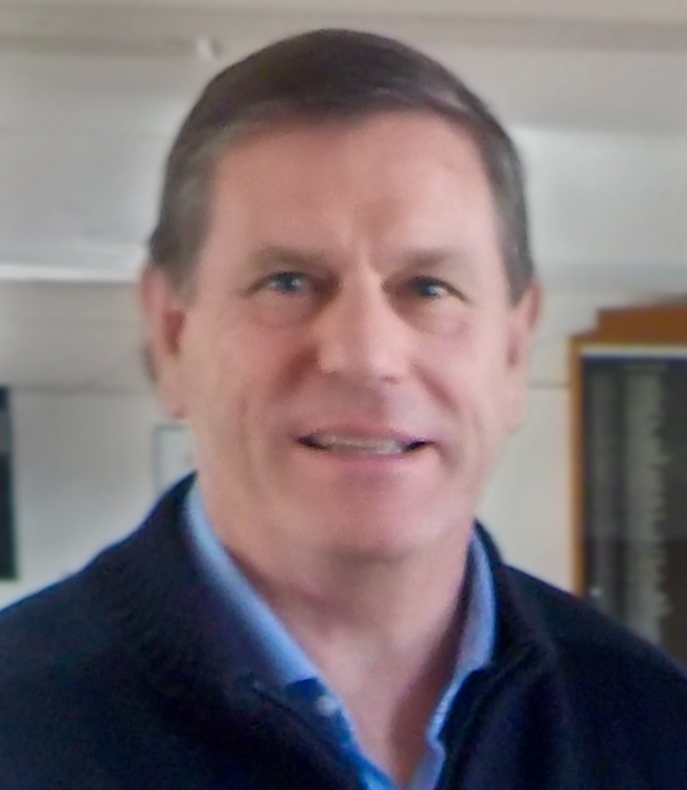
- Thompson in 2015

Member of the Victorian Legislative Assembly for Sandringham
- In office 3 October 1992 – 24 November 2018
- Preceded by: David Lea
- Succeeded by: Brad Rowswell

Personal details
- Born: Murray Hamilton Ross Thompson; 27 December 1953 (age 72) Melbourne, Victoria, Australia
- Party: Liberal Party
- Parent: Lindsay Thompson
- Education: Monash University
- Profession: Lawyer
- Website: murraythompson.com.au

Murray Thompson

Personal information
- Original team: Caulfield Grammar
- Height: 175 cm (5 ft 9 in)
- Weight: 71.5 kg (158 lb)

Playing career^{1}
Years	Club	Games (Goals)
1973–1976	Richmond	14 (4)
- ^{1} Playing statistics correct to the end of 1976.

Career highlights
- Richmond Reserves Premiership Player 1973

Murray Hamilton Ross Thompson OAM (born 27 December 1953) is a former member of the Victorian Legislative Assembly. He was the member for Sandringham in the Victorian Legislative Assembly from 1992 until his retirement in 2018. He is the son of former Liberal Premier of Victoria Lindsay Thompson.

== Early life and education ==
Thompson was educated at Caulfield Grammar School in Melbourne where he served as captain of football and member of debating team (1971–72), and was school captain in 1972. He was a member of the Caulfield Grammarians Cricket Club from 1973 to 1980. Thompson earned both a Bachelor of Arts (1979), a Bachelor of Laws (1981) from Monash University where he was Student Representative on the Law Faculty Ad Hoc Committee on Professional Practice (1979) and Law Student Society Committee Member. His postgraduate study earned him a Diploma of Education (1986) from Melbourne University.

Thompson was an Australian rules footballer playing as a midfielder for Richmond in the VFL until three knee operations caused him to retire after fourteen senior games.

== Career ==
Thompson was admitted to the Victorian Bar in 1982, and set up his own suburban legal practice, practising as a solicitor before being elected as Liberal Member for Sandringham in 1992 Victorian state election.

As a member of Parliament, he served on the Liberal frontbench in a range of portfolios in opposition, from December 2002 until he was dumped from the front bench in 2008. Thompson unsuccessfully contested the Liberal Party leadership against then Major Projects Minister Denis Napthine in the ballot resulting from the resignation of Premier Ted Baillieu.

In 2008, Thompson voted against legalising abortion in Victoria, and in 2015, voted against banning anti-abortion groups from protesting outside abortion clinics.

He retired from parliament at the 2018 Victorian state election, being succeeded by fellow Liberal Brad Rowswell.

== Bibliography ==
- Hogan P: The Tigers of Old, Richmond FC, Melbourne 1996

Victorian Legislative Assembly
Preceded by David Lea	Member for Sandringham; 1992–2018	Succeeded by Brad Rowswell
