= Gerard Vaughan (Australian politician) =

Australian politician (born 1946)

Gerard Marshall Vaughan (born 1 December 1946) is an Australian politician.

== Biography ==
Vaughan was born on 1 December 1946, in Glen Huntly, to David Arthur Vaughan and Mary Therese (née Russell). He attended state and Catholic schools and received an Associate Diploma of Chemical Engineering from the Royal Melbourne Institute of Technology in 1966. He worked as a chemical engineer with Australian Portland Cement Ltd. from 1967 to 1968, when he received a Bachelor of Education (Honours) from Monash University, followed by a Master of Engineering Science in 1971. He received a Diploma of Education from the State College of Victoria in 1973 and a PhD from Monash University in 1978. From 1968 to 1972, he was a research student and tutor in Monash University's Chemical Engineering Department, becoming a lecturer at Swinburne University of Technology in 1975. From 1977 to 1979, he was a research scientist with CSIRO's Mineral Engineering Division.

A Labor Party member since 1971, Vaughan ran unsuccessfully for the Victorian Legislative Assembly seat of Glenhuntly in 1976 but won the seat in 1979. He transferred to Clayton in 1985 following Glenhuntly's abolition. He served on a number of committees but was never promoted from the backbench, and he lost preselection to Hong Lim in 1996.

Victorian Legislative Assembly
Preceded by Joe Rafferty	Member for Glenhuntly; 1979–1985	Abolished
New seat	Member for Clayton; 1985–1996	Succeeded by Hong Lim
