= Meng Heang Tak =

Australian politician

Meng Heang Tak MP
- តាក់ ម៉េងហ៊ាង 狄明賢

Member of the Victorian Legislative Assembly for Clarinda
- Incumbent
- Assumed office 19 December 2018
- Preceded by: Hong Lim

Mayor of Greater Dandenong
- In office November 2015 – November 2016
- Preceded by: Sean O'Reilly
- Succeeded by: Jim Memeti

Councillor of the City of Greater Dandenong for Paperback Ward
- In office 27 October 2012 – 27 November 2018
- Succeeded by: Sophie Tan

Personal details
- Born: Cambodia
- Party: Labor
- Spouse: Manette
- Education: Heatherhill Secondary College
- Alma mater: Victoria University (BA, LLB)
- Occupation: Lawyer; Broadcaster; Politician
- Website: https://mengheangtak.org.au/

Meng Heang Tak (Khmer: តាក់ ម៉េងហ៊ាង, Chinese: 狄明賢) is an Australian politician and former lawyer. He has been a Labor Party member of the Victorian Legislative Assembly since November 2018, representing the seat of Clarinda.

Heang Tak was born in Cambodia and came to Australia at sixteen years old. He completed a double degree in Arts and Laws, Graduate Diploma in Legal Practice and Graduate Certificate in Migration Law at Victoria University. Before entering politics, he was a lawyer in Melbourne's south-east and a SBS Radio broadcaster. He was a councillor in the City of Greater Dandenong prior to being elected to Parliament, serving as mayor in 2015–16.

In 2018, Heang Tak won the safe Labor seat of Clarinda and safely retained the seat in 2022. Originally a member of Labor Right, Heang Tak joined Labor Left along with six of his colleagues shortly after the 2022 Victorian state election.

== Early life and career ==
Meng Heang Tak was born in Cambodia with Chinese heritage, and migrated with his family to Australia when he was sixteen years old, arriving in Australia for the first time in Melbourne at Tullamarine airport.

In Australia, he grew up in Springvale, Victoria, as part of a lower socio-economic community. He attended the English Language School at Westall Secondary located in Clayton South, before attending Heatherhill Secondary College in Keysborough. Following this, he completed a double degree in Arts and Laws, Graduate Diploma in Legal Practice and Graduate Certificate in Migration Law at Victoria University.

== Political career ==
A month prior to the 2023 Cambodian elections, Heang Tak received an anonymous threat letter, which is currently being investigated by Victoria Police. Despite the threat, he attended a pro-democracy protest in Victoria against Hun Sen. Heang Tak has been an advocate for human rights and democracy in Cambodia.

== Personal life ==
Heang Tak is personally known as 'Heang'. He has two sons and one daughter with his wife, whom they live together in Springvale.

Parliament of Victoria
| Preceded by Hong Lim | Member for Clarinda; 2018–present | Incumbent |
