= Brad Rowswell =

Australian politician (born 1986)

Brad Rowswell MP

Member of the Victorian Legislative Assembly for Sandringham
- Incumbent
- Assumed office 24 November 2018
- Preceded by: Murray Thompson

Personal details
- Born: 1985 (age 40–41) Sandringham, Victoria
- Party: Liberal

Brad Rowswell (born 1985) is an Australian politician. He has been a Liberal Party member of the Victorian Legislative Assembly since November 2018, representing the seat of Sandringham. He currently serves as Shadow Minister for Education, Shadow Minister for Industrial Relations and Shadow Minister for Government Services.

He was for a time the Shadow Assistant Minister to the Leader of the Opposition and Secretary to the Shadow Cabinet; he was removed from this role on Matthew Guy's return to the Liberal Party leadership in September 2021.

Rowswell was Shadow Treasurer from December 2022 to January 2025 and was appointed Shadow Environment Minister.

== Early life and career ==
Rowswell was born at the Sandringham Hospital and grew up in the suburb of Beaumaris. He was educated at St Bede's College in Mentone. Rowswell once studied to be a Catholic priest.

Prior to his election to parliament, Rowswell worked as a political advisor and a communications manager for the defense contractor Raytheon.

== Political career ==
Rowswell was preselected as the Liberal candidate for the seat of Sandringham in 2018 over former councillor Felicity Frederico. There was a 9.5% swing against him, and he won the election by slightly over 500 votes. While campaigning in 2017, a fundraiser for his campaign included former tennis player Margaret Court.

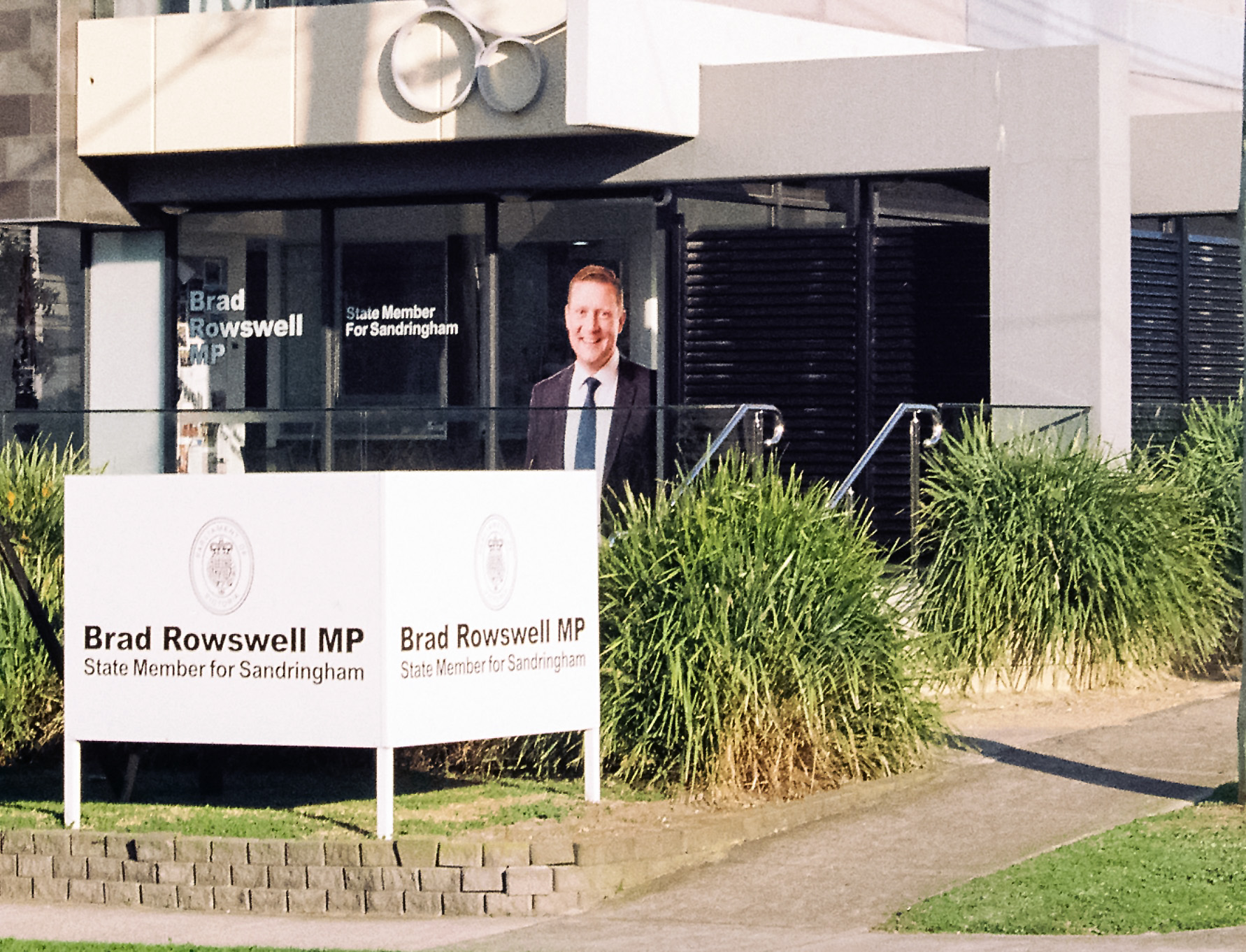
Rowswell's office on Bay Rd, Sandringham

Rowswell was appointed Shadow Minister for Energy in March 2021 by Michael O'Brien. When O'Brien was subject to a leadership spill and replaced by Matthew Guy in September 2021 Rowswell was removed from the shadow cabinet.

Rowswell was re-elected at the 2022 Victorian state election. After the election he ran in the 2022 Victorian Liberal Party deputy leadership election, losing to David Southwick, and was subsequently appointed Shadow Treasurer. Rowswell voted to expel Moira Deeming from the parliamentary Liberal Party in May 2023. Rowswell is considered a conservative MP, who in his time working as a federal political adviser was close to Tony Abbott. Rowswell admitted to taking cannabis. He was accused of mocking transgender people. On Wednesday 5 May 2021, Rowswell refuted these claims by way of Personal Explanation in the Parliament, stating: "Mr. Meddick's allegation is untrue and I wholeheartedly refute any suggestion that a private conversation which I participated in sought to characterise transgender and gender-diverse people in this way. I remain aggrieved by the substantial potential of Mr Meddick’s remarks to impugn my integrity and character among both transgender and gender diverse communities, as well as the Victorian community at large."

Rowswell voted against Moira Deeming being reinstated to the Victorian Parliamentary Liberal Party. Rowswell lost his position as Shadow Treasurer to James Newbury following John Pesutto's removal as Liberal leader, Rowswell went to England to examine economic growth opportunities for Victoria.

Parliament of Victoria
| Preceded by Murray Thompson | Member for Sandringham; 2018–present | Incumbent |
