= Max Crellin =

Australian politician (1933–2020)

Maxwell Leslie Crellin (16 July 1933 – 5 May 2020) was an Australian politician.

Crellin was born in Preston to butcher Leslie Francis Crellin and dressmaker Myrtle Louisa Agnew. He attended school at Belgrave, Chatham and Camberwell before studying at Melbourne University. He was a clerk and underwent national service, eventually becoming an assistant executive in the Australian Road Federation in 1964. On 10 November 1964 he married Joan Margaret Heasley, with whom he had two sons. In 1966 he became secretary of the Victorian branches of the Bus Proprietors' Association and the Taxi Association.

In 1970 Crellin was elected to the Victorian Legislative Assembly as the Liberal member for Sandringham. He served until his defeat in 1982.

Victorian Legislative Assembly
Preceded by Murray Porter	Member for Sandringham; 1970–1982	Succeeded by Graham Ihlein
