= Graham Ihlein =

Australian politician

Graham Richard Ihlein (born 11 November 1951) is an Australian politician. He was a Labor Party member of the Victorian Legislative Assembly from 1982 until 1985, representing the electorate of Sandringham.

Ihlein was born in the Sydney suburb of Lakemba, and attended Yagoona State School. His family later moved to Victoria, where he attended Morwell High School and studied law at Monash University. He worked as a research officer (1974–1975) and senior industrial officer (1975–1979) for the Australian Public Service Association, and was a federal industrial officer for the Australian Telecommunications Employees Association from 1979 until 1982. Ihlein had joined the Labor Party in 1975, had been the Sandringham campaign manager in 1979, and was a member of the party's economic policy committee from 1981 to 1982.

Ihlein was elected to the Legislative Assembly at the 1982 state election, winning the formerly safe Liberal seat of Sandringham. Sandringham had been held by the Liberal Party since its inception, and while the seat had become considerably more marginal since a 1976 redistribution, the incumbent Liberal MLA, Max Crellin, had held off Labor challenges in 1976 and 1979. Ihlein campaigned for eighteen months prior to the election, and focused heavily on retaining the Sandringham railway line, which had been threatened with closure under a report made for the previous government. The campaign proved to be successful, with Ihlein winning a narrow victory as the Cain Labor government won office statewide.

A redistribution prior to the 1985 election made Sandringham notionally Liberal again. Ihlein instead contested and lost Evelyn to Liberal Jim Plowman, while Ihlein staffer and future federal MP Ann Corcoran contested and lost Sandringham.

Parliament of Victoria
Preceded by Max Crellin	Member for Sandringham; 1982–1985	Succeeded by David Lea
