= Electoral district of Sandringham =

State electoral district of Victoria, Australia

Sandringham Victoria—Legislative Assembly
- Interactive map of electoral district boundaries from the 2022 state election
- State: Victoria
- Created: 1955
- MP: Brad Rowswell
- Party: Liberal
- Namesake: Sandringham
- Electors: 45,020 (2018)
- Area: 24 km^{2} (9.3 sq mi)
- Demographic: Metropolitan

The electoral district of Sandringham is one of the electoral districts of Victoria, Australia, for the Victorian Legislative Assembly. It consists of the Melbourne bayside suburbs of Beaumaris, Black Rock and Sandringham, and parts of Cheltenham, Hampton, Highett, and Mentone.

Since the seat was created in 1955, it has been held by the Liberal Party, except for the period 1982-5 when it was held by the Labor Party. The seat is currently held by Brad Rowswell of the Liberal Party with a margin of 5.1%. The Liberal Party experienced a swing towards it at the 2022 Victorian state election.

== Members for Sandringham ==
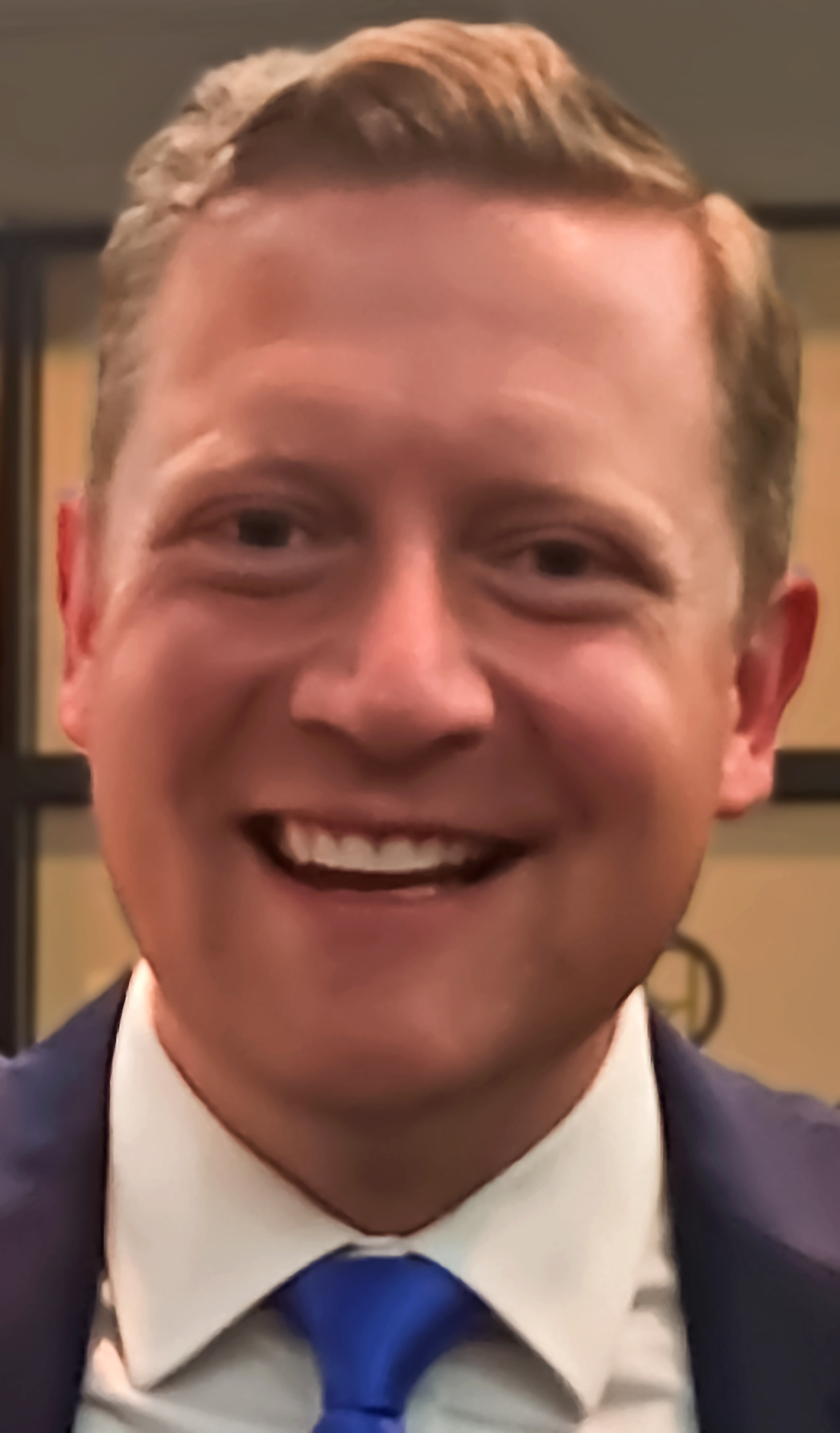
Current Member for Sandringham Brad Rowswell

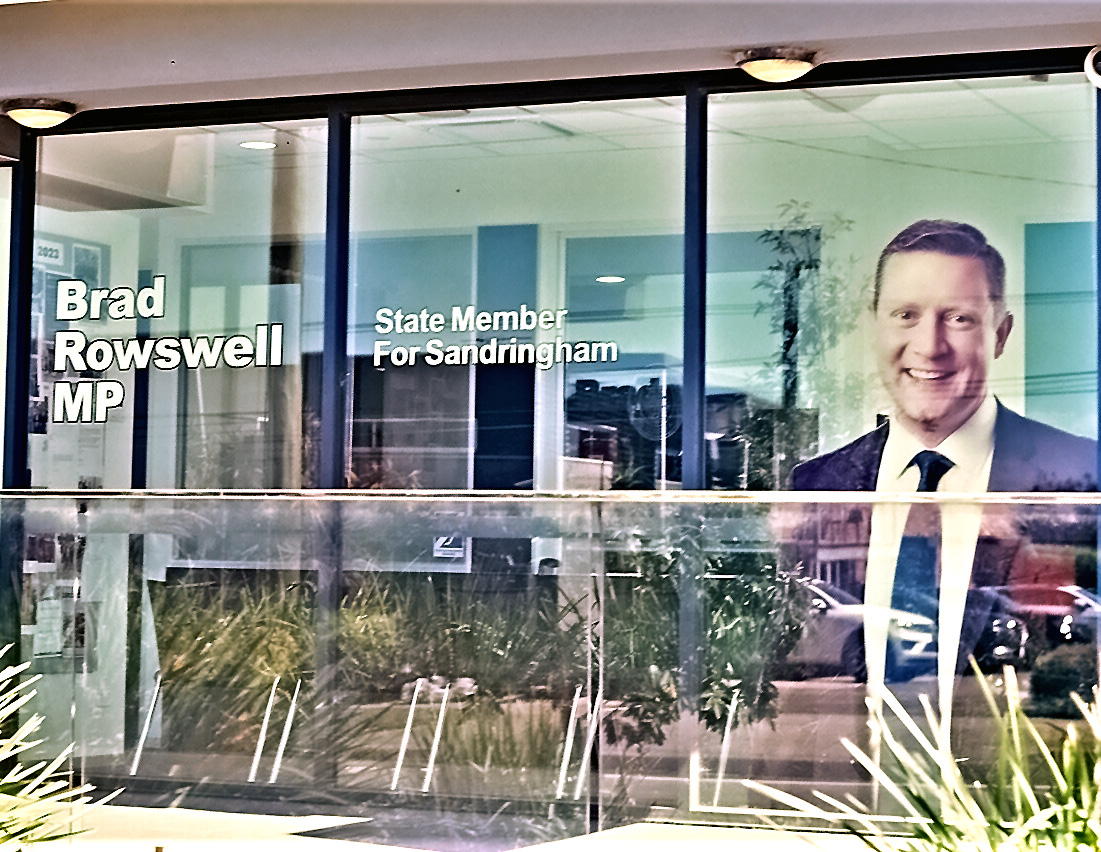
Office of Brad Rowswell on Bay Road Sandringham

Member	Party	Term
Murray Porter	LCP	1955–1970
Murray Porter	Liberal	1955–1970
Max Crellin	Liberal	1970–1982
Graham Ihlein	Labor	1982–1985
David Lea	Liberal	1985–1992
Murray Thompson	Liberal	1992–2018
Brad Rowswell	Liberal	2018–present

== Election results ==
2022 Victorian state election: Sandringham
Party	Candidate	Votes	%	±%
Liberal	Brad Rowswell	18,783	46.4	+3.8
Labor	Bettina Prescott	10,426	25.7	−7.4
Greens	Alysia Regan	5,949	14.7	+6.5
Independent	Clarke Martin	2,800	6.9	−1.6
Animal Justice	Barbara Eppingstall	976	2.4	−0.8
Democratic Labour	Karla Zmegac	749	1.9	−1.0
Family First	Jill Chalmers	714	1.8	+1.8
Independent	Rodney Campbell	115	0.3	+0.3
Total formal votes		40,510	96.0	+0.8
Informal votes		1,701	4.0	−0.8
Turnout		42,211	91.2	+2.2
Two-party-preferred result
Liberal	Brad Rowswell	22,294	55.0	+4.6
Labor	Bettina Prescott	18,216	45.0	−4.6
Liberal hold		Swing	+4.6	
