= Hong Lim =

Australian politician

Member of the Victorian Legislative Assembly for Clarinda
- In office 29 November 2014 – 24 November 2018
- Preceded by: New seat
- Succeeded by: Meng Heang Tak

Member of the Victorian Legislative Assembly for Clayton
- In office 30 March 1996 – 29 November 2014
- Preceded by: Gerard Vaughan
- Succeeded by: Seat abolished

Personal details
- Born: 11 November 1950 (age 75) Cambodia, French Indochina
- Party: Labor Party
- Education: University of Tasmania; Monash University

Hong Lim (simplified Chinese: 林美丰; traditional Chinese: 林美豐; pinyin: Lín Měifēng; born 11 November 1950) is an Australian politician. He was a member of the Victorian Legislative Assembly from 1996 to 2018, representing the seat of Clayton until 2014 and Clarinda from 2014 to his retirement in 2018. He represented the Labor Party.

Lim was born in Cambodia, and is of Chinese Cambodian origins. He was educated at schools in Phnom Penh before coming to Australia in 1970, and then at the University of Tasmania and Monash University, Melbourne, where he graduated in arts. He was Chairman of the Victorian Indo-Chinese Communities Council 1984–92 and president of the Cambodian Association of Victoria 1992–96. He was a commissioner of the Victorian Ethnic Affairs Commission 1985–92, and a member of the Monash University Council 1996–98.

Lim was elected to the Legislative Assembly in 1996, and was an appointed Parliamentary Secretary to the Minister for Victorian Communities, John Thwaites, in 2002.

Lim retired in 2018 after 22 years in parliament.

Victorian Legislative Assembly
Preceded by Gerard Vaughan	Member for Clayton; 1996–2014	Abolished
New seat	Member for Clarinda; 2014–2018	Succeeded by Meng Heang Tak
