= David Lea (Australian politician) =

Australian politician (1935–2021)

David John Lea (4 July 1935 – 17 January 2021) was an Australian politician.

Lea was born in Stourbridge in Worcestershire, England, to Sidney Lea, a managing director, and Winifred Greaves, a secretary. The family arrived in Melbourne in 1948, and David attended Melbourne High School (1949–52) and then the University of Melbourne, where he received a Bachelor of Arts in 1957, a Diploma of Education in 1958 and a Bachelor of Education in 1966.

He worked as an English teacher and examiner throughout the 1960s, and later as a school principal. On 2 March 1985 he was elected to the Victorian Legislative Assembly as the Liberal member for Sandringham. A backbencher, he was re-elected in 1988 and was preselected to contest the seat in 1992, but resigned shortly before the election.

Victorian Legislative Assembly
Preceded by Graham Ihlein	Member for Sandringham; 1985–1992	Succeeded by Murray Thompson
