= Future Made in Australia =

Australian federal policy initiative

Future Made in Australia is an Australian federal industrial policy initiative relating to the transition to net zero emissions. It was introduced and implemented by the Labor government of Anthony Albanese in 2024.

== History ==
In April 2024, Prime Minister Anthony Albanese unveiled an interventionist industrial policy focusing on the transition to net zero emissions, which would be underpinned by a "Future Made in Australia Act". Later, Treasurer Jim Chalmers clarified that this policy would be focused on incentivising, but not replacing investment.

Chalmers gave a speech which laid out the "guardrails" for the policy in May 2024. The Australian government announced a A$566 million initiative to comprehensively map what is under Australian soil and seabed. The Australian government released a strategy on liquid natural gas, outlining it as a "transition" fuel through to 2050 and beyond.

The Future Made in Australia policy was a major part of the 2024 Australian federal budget. Five priority industries were identified: renewable hydrogen, critical minerals processing, green metals, low carbon liquid fuels and clean energy manufacturing.

In late May 2024, the Australian federal government announced a National Battery Strategy. It sets out a goal for the country to be manufacturing batteries with "secure supply chains" by 2035.

The Future Made in Australia policy, introduced in the 2024 federal budget, allocates approximately $22.7 billion over ten years to support clean energy and advanced manufacturing. Funding priorities include renewable hydrogen production, critical minerals processing, solar panel manufacturing, and battery production. Companies are required to commence production before receiving government credits, ensuring that public funds support viable projects. The package also provides grants and production incentives for stages of hydrogen and clean energy manufacturing, with measures intended to reduce fiscal risk by focusing on projects that are ready to deliver results.

A National Interest Framework identifies priority sectors such as renewable hydrogen, green metals, low-carbon fuels, and clean energy manufacturing. Analysts note that applicants must demonstrate measurable production milestones, positioning the policy as both an industrial strategy and a safeguard against unproven projects. Scholars argue that such mission-oriented interventions can accelerate Australia’s transition to net zero, strengthen the nation's role in global supply chains for critical minerals and clean energy, and leverage its renewable energy advantages to build a competitive sustainable manufacturing base.

== Legislation ==
Legislation passed as part of the initiative
Name	Citation	Royal assent	Description
Future Made in Australia Act 2024	No. 119, 2024	10 December 2024	Establishes a "National Interest Framework" for deciding if projects should or should not go ahead.
Future Made in Australia (Omnibus Amendments No. 1) Act 2024	No. 120, 2024	10 December 2024	Establishes the Guarantee of Origin scheme.; The Guarantee of Origin scheme administers the Product Guarantee of Origin and the Renewable Electricity Guarantee of Origin.; Under the PGO certificate stream, certificates are issued to allow relevant organisations to prove where a given product was produced and the quantity of emissions associated with its production, transport and storage.; Under the REGO certificate stream, certificates are issued to allow relevant organisations to prove when, where and how much renewable energy was produced. REGO certificates would work in parallel with the Renewable Energy Target, before replacing its certification system from 2031.
Future Made in Australia (Guarantee of Origin) Act 2024	No. 121, 2024	10 December 2024	
Future Made in Australia (Guarantee of Origin Charges) Act 2024	No. 122, 2024	10 December 2024	
Future Made in Australia (Guarantee of Origin Consequential Amendments and Transitional Provisions) Act 2024	No. 123, 2024	10 December 2024	
Future Made in Australia (Production Tax Credits and Other Measures) Act 2025	No. 9, 2025	14 February 2025	Introduces a $2 per kg renewable hydrogen production tax incentive.; Introduces a 10% tax break for critical minerals processors on processing and refining costs.

== Reception ==
Saul Eslake criticised the proposed policy, describing the use of terms such as "national sovereignty" and "national security" as cover for bad policy. Kylie Walker, a fellow at the Australian National University, was supportive, but emphasised that increasing diversity in the science and technology workforce would help reduce skill shortages.

The Future Made in Australia policy has been compared to the American Inflation Reduction Act and the European Green Deal as examples of industrial policy. The program has been described as a shift away from the Washington Consensus.

The program has been criticised for not including health manufacturing, food processing and agriculture in the list of priority industries. Ending the continued subsidy of oil and gas projects has been suggested as a possible extension of the program, by Christian Downie, a researcher at the Australian National University.

The National Battery Strategy has been criticised for not providing enough funding for supporting remote communities to deal with the impacts such as contamination of land and water, biodiversity loss, and the destruction of sites of cultural heritage sites.

Several federal MPs have argued that household electrification schemes should be a key part of the program in the future. Greens MPs voted for the program even as they criticised the support for oil and gas projects included in other parts of the budget.

The initial legislation, the Future Made in Australia Act 2024, has been criticised for having "vague and difficult to interpret" guidelines.

The restriction of the hydrogen tax credit for "green hydrogen" (renewable hydrogen) over "blue hydrogen" (non-renewable hydrogen) has been criticised by David Heard, an energy expert who previously worked at Shell. The lack of a requirement for hydrogen classed as "renewable" to be produced by renewable energy at all times was criticised by Steve Hoy, founder and CEO of power tracing technology company Enosi.
