= Anthony Albanese =

Prime Minister of Australia since 2022

The Honourable Anthony Albanese MP
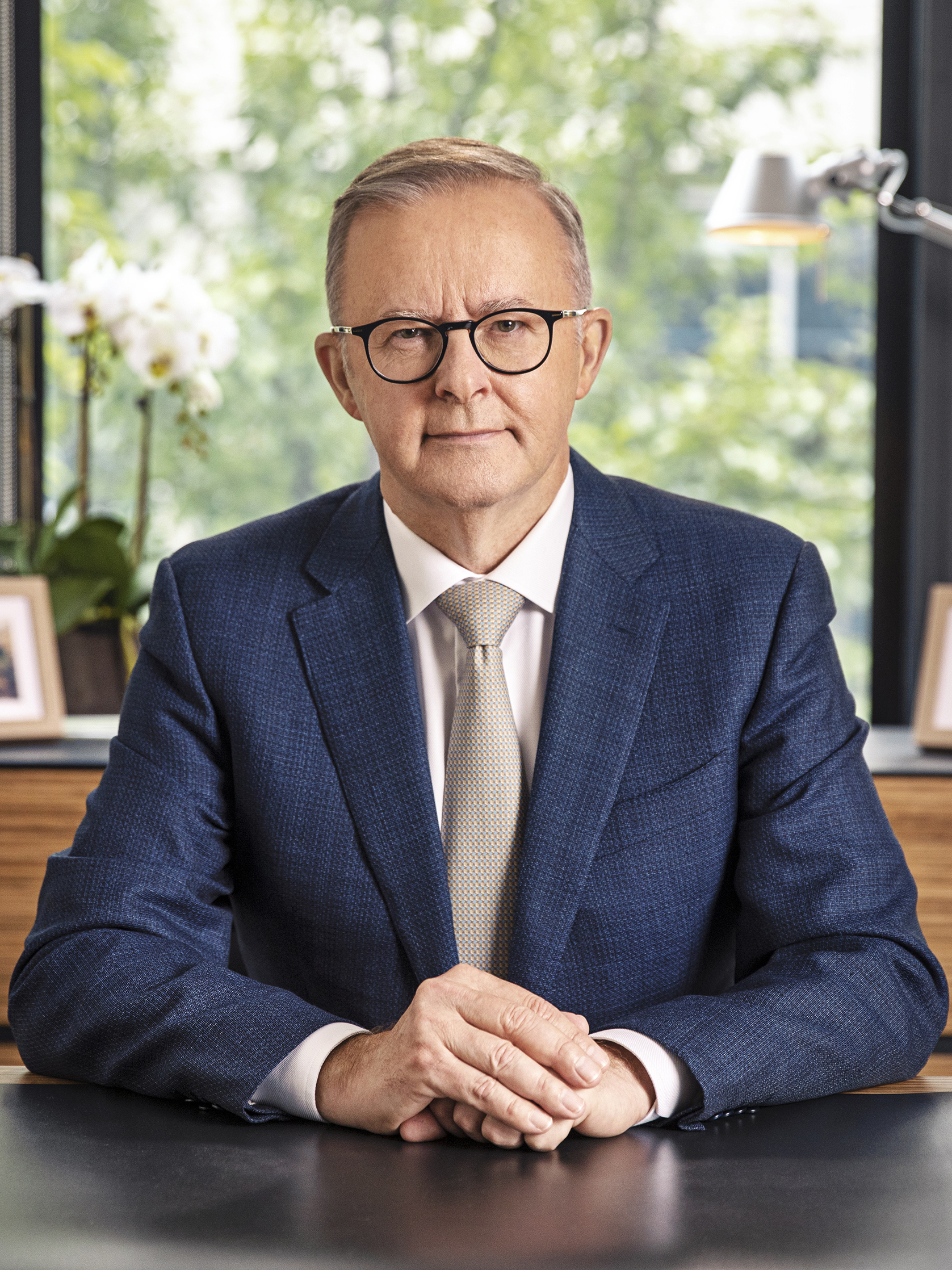
- Official portrait, 2022

31st Prime Minister of Australia
- Incumbent
- Assumed office 23 May 2022
- Monarchs: Elizabeth II; Charles III
- Governors General: David Hurley; Sam Mostyn
- Deputy: Richard Marles
- Preceded by: Scott Morrison

21st Leader of the Labor Party
- Incumbent
- Assumed office 30 May 2019
- Deputy: Richard Marles
- Preceded by: Bill Shorten
Previous offices 2007–2022
Leader of the Opposition
In office 30 May 2019 – 23 May 2022
Prime Minister	Scott Morrison
Deputy	Richard Marles
Preceded by	Bill Shorten
Succeeded by	Peter Dutton
Deputy Prime Minister of Australia
In office 27 June 2013 – 18 September 2013
Prime Minister	Kevin Rudd
Preceded by	Wayne Swan
Succeeded by	Warren Truss
Deputy Leader of the Labor Party
In office 26 June 2013 – 13 October 2013
Leader	Kevin Rudd
Preceded by	Wayne Swan
Succeeded by	Tanya Plibersek
Minister for Infrastructure and Transport
In office 3 December 2007 – 18 September 2013
Prime Minister	Kevin Rudd; Julia Gillard; Kevin Rudd
Preceded by	Mark Vaile
Succeeded by	Warren Truss
Leader of the House
In office 3 December 2007 – 18 September 2013
Prime Minister	Kevin Rudd; Julia Gillard; Kevin Rudd
Deputy	Stephen Smith
Preceded by	Tony Abbott
Succeeded by	Christopher Pyne
Minister for Broadband, Communications and the Digital Economy
In office 1 July 2013 – 18 September 2013
Prime Minister	Kevin Rudd
Preceded by	Stephen Conroy
Succeeded by	Malcolm Turnbull (as Minister for Communications)
Minister for Regional Development and Local Government
In office 25 March 2013 – 1 July 2013
Prime Minister	Julia Gillard; Kevin Rudd
Preceded by	Simon Crean
Succeeded by	Catherine King
In office 3 December 2007 – 14 September 2010
Prime Minister	Kevin Rudd; Julia Gillard
Preceded by	Jim Lloyd
Succeeded by	Simon Crean
Manager of Opposition Business
In office 10 December 2006 – 3 December 2007
Leader	Kevin Rudd
Preceded by	Julia Gillard
Succeeded by	Joe Hockey

Member of the Australian Parliament for Grayndler
- Incumbent
- Assumed office 2 March 1996
- Preceded by: Jeannette McHugh

Personal details
- Born: Anthony Norman Albanese; 2 March 1963 (age 63) Darlinghurst, New South Wales, Australia
- Party: Labor
- Spouses: Carmel Tebbutt (m. 2000; div. 2019) Jodie Haydon (m. 2025)
- Children: 1
- Education: University of Sydney (BEc)
- Cabinet: I; II
- Website: Personal website; Government website
- Nickname: Albo
- Anthony Albanese's voice Albanese speaking about his party's foreign policy and the legacy of Prime Minister John Curtin; Recorded 4 March 2022

Anthony Norman Albanese (Note: Pronounced /ˌælbəˈniːzi/ AL-bə-NEE-zee or /ˈælbəniːz/ AL-bə-neez; Italian: [al.baˈne.ze]. Both pronunciations have been used by Albanese himself during his life; they have both been in common use among other speakers at various stages. While Albanese always used /ˈælbəniːz/ throughout his early life, he later began using /ˌælbəˈniːzi/.) (born 2 March 1963) is an Australian politician who has served as the 31st prime minister of Australia since 2022. He has been the leader of the Labor Party since 2019 and the member of Parliament (MP) for the New South Wales division of Grayndler since 1996.

Born in Sydney, Albanese attended St Mary's Cathedral College and graduated from the University of Sydney in 1984 with a bachelor's degree in economics. As a student, he joined the Labor Party and later worked as a party official and research officer before entering Parliament. He was elected to the House of Representatives at the 1996 federal election, winning the Inner West Sydney seat of Grayndler. He was appointed to the shadow cabinet in 2001 by Simon Crean. After Labor's victory in the 2007 election, Albanese was appointed Leader of the House, and was also made Minister for Regional Development and Local Government and Minister for Infrastructure and Transport, a role he retained after Kevin Rudd was replaced as prime minister by Julia Gillard in 2010. He supported Rudd's challenges against Gillard in 2012 and 2013. Following a final leadership ballot in June 2013, which saw Rudd return as prime minister, Albanese was elected the deputy leader of the Labor Party and sworn in as deputy prime minister the following day, a position he held for less than three months, as Labor was defeated at the 2013 election.

After the party's election defeat, Albanese stood for leadership of the Labor Party against Bill Shorten in a leadership election. Although Albanese won a large majority of the membership, Shorten received more support from Labor MPs and became leader. Shorten subsequently appointed Albanese to his Shadow Cabinet. After Labor's surprise defeat in the 2019 election, Shorten resigned as leader, with Albanese becoming the only person nominated in the leadership election to replace him; he was subsequently elected unopposed as leader of the Labor Party, becoming Leader of the Opposition. He led the party to victory at the 2022 election, defeating the Liberal–National Coalition.

In his first term, Albanese led his government's response to a cost-of-living crisis caused by the 2021–2023 inflation surge, held an unsuccessful referendum to enshrine an Indigenous Voice to Parliament in the Constitution, updated Australia's climate targets to reach carbon neutrality by 2050, oversaw an acceleration of renewable energy projects, made major changes to industrial relations laws, enacted the Future Made in Australia industrial policy, created the National Anti-Corruption Commission, introduced a ban on children under sixteen from using social media platforms, established the Royal Commission into the Robodebt Scheme and expanded access to paid parental leave and subsidised childcare. In foreign policy, Albanese pledged further logistical support to Ukraine to assist with the Russo-Ukrainian war, attempted to strengthen relations in the Pacific region, and oversaw an easing of tensions and trade restrictions put on Australia by China. He also administered the official commencement of the AUKUS security pact between Australia, the United States, and the United Kingdom, and navigated Australia's response to the Gaza war.

Albanese's government was re-elected in a landslide victory at the 2025 election, resulting in one of the largest Labor governments in Australian history. In his second term, Albanese's government reduced university education fees, responded to Australia's housing unaffordability crisis, set the country's first 2035 emissions reduction targets, established the National Environmental Protection Agency and Centre for Disease Control, responded to the 2025 Bondi Beach shooting and the oil crisis caused by 2026 Iran war, and initiated the Royal Commission on Antisemitism and Social Cohesion. On matters of foreign policy, his government recognised the State of Palestine, responded to President Donald Trump's tariffs, pledged support for US and Israeli attacks on Iran and finalised a free trade agreement with the European Union. Despite being ideologically aligned with the Labor Left faction, Labor has shifted towards the political centre during Albanese's tenure as prime minister.

== Early life ==
=== Family and background ===
Anthony Norman Albanese was born on 2 March 1963 at St Margaret's Hospital in the Sydney suburb of Darlinghurst. He is the son of Carlo Albanese and Maryanne Ellery (1936–2002). His mother was Australian, while his father was from Barletta in Italy. They met in March 1962 on a passenger ship from Sydney to Southampton, England, where his father was working as a steward. After she fell pregnant, he told her he was engaged to a woman in Italy and could not marry her. His mother returned to Sydney in October 1962 and the two did not remain in contact. Albanese's mother adopted Carlo's surname, and named Anthony after his cousin Anthony Howett, who had died in a car accident four years earlier.

Growing up, Albanese was told that his father had died in a car accident. He did not make contact with his father until 2009, visiting him a number of times in Italy. He subsequently discovered that he had two half-siblings. During the Australian parliamentary eligibility crisis of 2017, it was noted that although birth to an Italian father would ordinarily automatically confer Italian citizenship, Albanese's father was not recorded on his birth certificate and thus he met the parliamentary eligibility requirements of section 44 of the Constitution. His father died in 2014.

=== Childhood and education ===
Albanese grew up with his mother and maternal grandparents in a Sydney City Council home in the Inner West suburb of Camperdown, opposite the Camperdown Children's Hospital. His grandfather died in 1970, and the following year his mother married James Williamson. He was given his stepfather's surname, but the marriage lasted only ten weeks, as Williamson proved to be an abusive alcoholic. Albanese's mother worked part-time as a cleaner but suffered from chronic rheumatoid arthritis, with the family living on her disability pension and his grandmother's age pension.

Albanese attended St Joseph's Primary School in Camperdown and then St Mary's Cathedral College. While at school, he worked part-time selling newspapers. He captained St Mary's on several episodes of the children's game show It's Academic in 1978. Albanese joined the Australian Labor Party (ALP) in 1979 at the age of 15, as a member of Young Labor. He subsequently helped found a Labor Club at his high school.

After finishing school, Albanese worked briefly at the Commonwealth Bank before enrolling in an economics degree at the University of Sydney. There, he became involved in student politics and was elected to the Students' Representative Council (SRC). He stood unsuccessfully for the SRC presidency in 1983, losing to Belinda Neal. It was also there where he started his rise as a key player in the ALP's Labor Left. During his time in student politics, Albanese led a group within Young Labor that was aligned with the left faction's "Hard Left", which the Australian politician Andrew Leigh said maintained "links with broader left-wing groups, such as the Communist Party of Australia, People for Nuclear Disarmament and the African National Congress".

=== Pre-parliamentary career and travel ===
After completing his economics degree in 1984, Albanese took on a role as a research officer to the then Minister for Local Government and Administrative Services, Tom Uren, who became a mentor to him. In 1989, the position of Assistant General Secretary of the New South Wales branch of the Labor Party became vacant when John Faulkner was elected to the Senate. The election to replace him was closely disputed between the Labor Left's Hard Left and Soft Left groupings, with Albanese being elected with the backing of the Hard Left, taking on that role for the next six years. In 1995, he left the position to work as a senior adviser to New South Wales Premier Bob Carr.

Albanese's first overseas trip was in 1986, accompanying his friend Jeremy Fisher to Vanuatu. In 1987, Albanese joined his boss Tom Uren on a visit to South-East Asia, which included: a meeting of the United Nations Economic and Social Commission for Asia and the Pacific in Bangkok, Thailand; an Anzac Day dawn service at the Kanchanaburi War Cemetery with John Carrick; and a tour of Cambodia alongside Bill Hayden's daughter Ingrid. He then travelled extensively in 1988, visiting Zimbabwe, Zambia, Botswana, Western Europe on a Contiki tour, and Eastern Europe and Scandinavia as a backpacker. Upon returning to Australia, he began dating Carmel Tebbutt, with whom he would holiday in Europe and South-East Asia, plus a backpacking trip to India in 1991. Sometime during his 20s, Albanese also took part in a tour of the United States by the U.S. State Department, with a thematic focus on the interaction of advocacy groups with the U.S. Government.

In 1990, Albanese bought a semi-detached two-bedroom house in the Inner West Sydney suburb of Marrickville.

== Early political career ==
=== Entry to Parliament ===
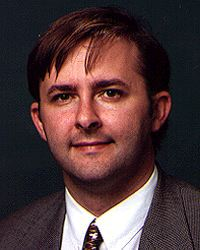
Albanese shortly after his election to Parliament

When Jeannette McHugh announced she would not seek re-election in her seat of Grayndler at the 1996 election, Albanese won preselection for the seat. The campaign was a difficult one, with aircraft noise a big political issue following the opening of the third runway at Sydney Airport, and the newly established No Aircraft Noise party (NAN) having polled strongly in the local area at the 1995 New South Wales election. Veteran political pundit Malcolm Mackerras predicted NAN would win the seat. However, NAN's candidate finished third, with less than 14% of the vote. Despite suffering a six-point swing against Labor, Albanese was elected with a comfortable 16-point margin.

In his maiden speech to the House of Representatives, Albanese spoke about the building of a third runway at Sydney Airport, aircraft noise and the need to build a second airport to service Sydney, as well as his support for funding public infrastructure in general, multiculturalism, native title, the social wage and childcare. He concluded by saying, "For myself, I will be satisfied if I can be remembered as someone who will stand up for the interests of my electorate, for working-class people, for the labour movement, and for our progressive advancement as a nation into the next century."

In his first year in Parliament he continued this theme, speaking in favour of the Northern Territory's euthanasia legislation, the rights of the Indigenous community in the Hindmarsh Island bridge controversy, and entitlement to superannuation for same-sex couples.

This last issue became a cause to which he was particularly dedicated. In 1998 he unsuccessfully moved a private member's bill that would have given same-sex couples the same rights to superannuation as de facto heterosexual couples. Over the next nine years, he tried three more times without success, until the election of the Rudd government in 2007 saw the legislation passed. Albanese subsequently turned his attention to campaigning for same-sex marriage.

=== Appointment to Shadow Cabinet ===
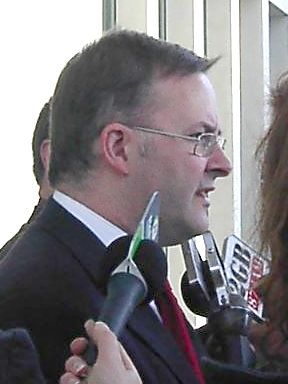
Albanese in 2005

In 1998, Albanese was appointed a parliamentary secretary, a position which assists ministers and shadow ministers and is often a stepping stone to a full ministerial position.

In 2001, Albanese was promoted to the opposition Shadow Cabinet, taking the portfolio of ageing and seniors. A 2002 reshuffle saw him become Shadow Minister for Employment Services and Training, and in 2004 he became Shadow Minister for Environment and Heritage. It was during this latter role that then prime minister John Howard and science minister Brendan Nelson started raising the idea of nuclear power for Australia. Albanese campaigned strongly against them, as well as elements within his own party, arguing that "Nuclear energy doesn't add up economically, environmentally or socially, and after more than 50 years of debate, we still do not have an answer to nuclear proliferation or nuclear waste."

In 2005, Albanese was given the additional role of Shadow Minister for Water alongside his existing responsibilities, and was also appointed Deputy Manager of Opposition Business in the House. In December 2006, when Kevin Rudd first became Leader of the Labor Party, Albanese took over from Julia Gillard as Manager of Opposition Business in the House, a senior tactical role on the floor of the parliament, and was appointed Shadow Minister for Water and Infrastructure.

== Cabinet minister ==
=== Rudd government ===
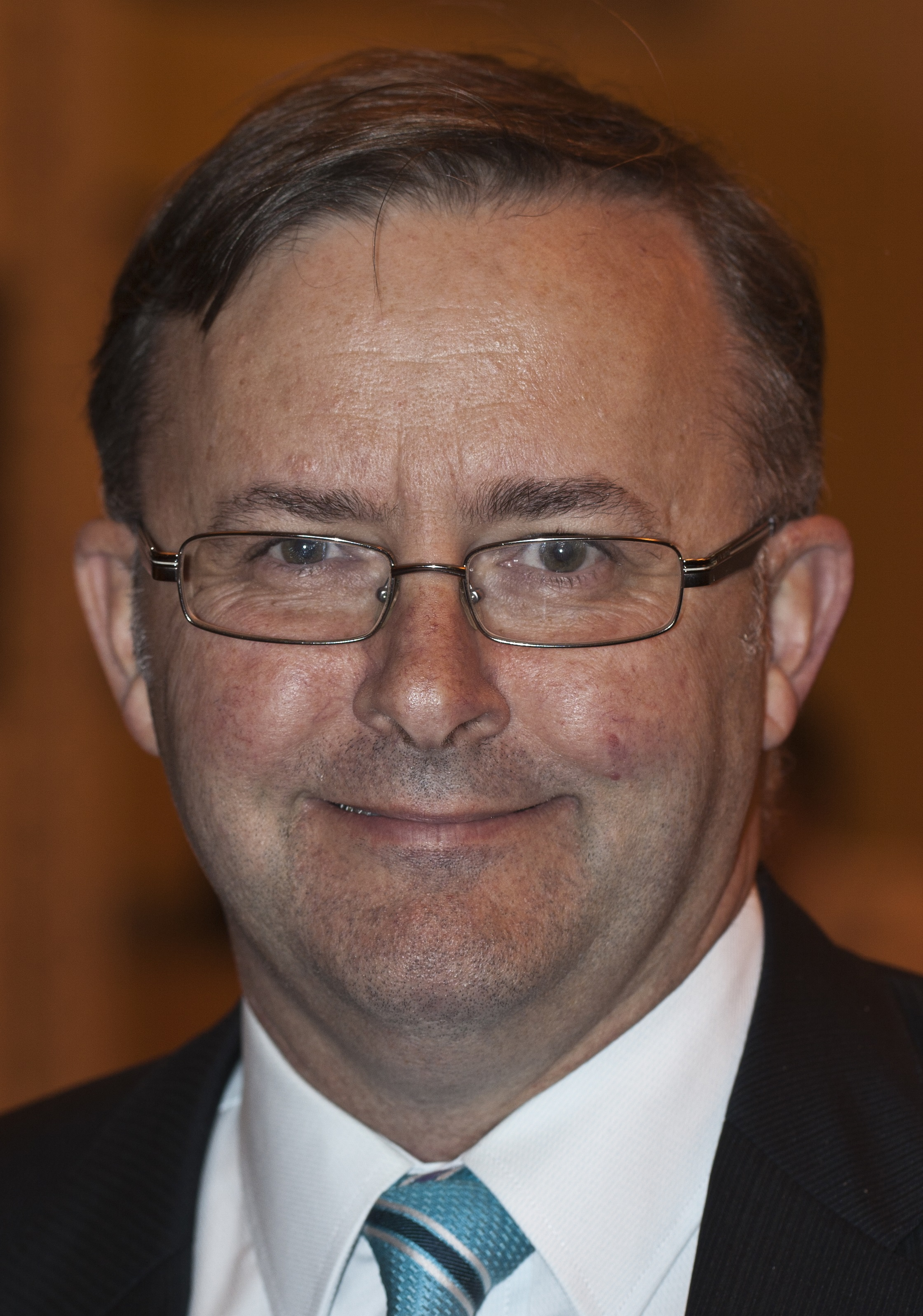
Albanese in 2011

Following Labor's victory at the 2007 election, Albanese's rise in standing within the party was evidenced by his appointment as Minister for Infrastructure and Transport, Minister for Regional Development and Local Government and Leader of the House in the Rudd ministry. Rudd was sworn in alongside his colleagues on 3 December 2007.

The Labor Party had gone to the election criticising the previous government for ignoring "long-term nation building in favour of short-term political spending". One of Albanese's first moves as Minister for Infrastructure and Transport was the establishment of an independent statutory body, Infrastructure Australia, to advise the Government on infrastructure priorities. Armed with advice from this independent body and his own persuasive skills in the Cabinet, he was able to argue for a doubling of the roads budget and a tenfold increase in rail investment. The establishment of Infrastructure Australia was regarded by many as a success; projects delivered through the Infrastructure Australia process included Melbourne's Regional Rail Link, the Hunter Expressway, the Ipswich Motorway, the Gold Coast light rail system G:link, the Redcliffe Peninsula railway line, the extension of the Noarlunga Centre railway line to Seaford, South Australia and various projects along the Pacific Highway in NSW and Bruce Highway in Queensland.

=== Gillard government ===
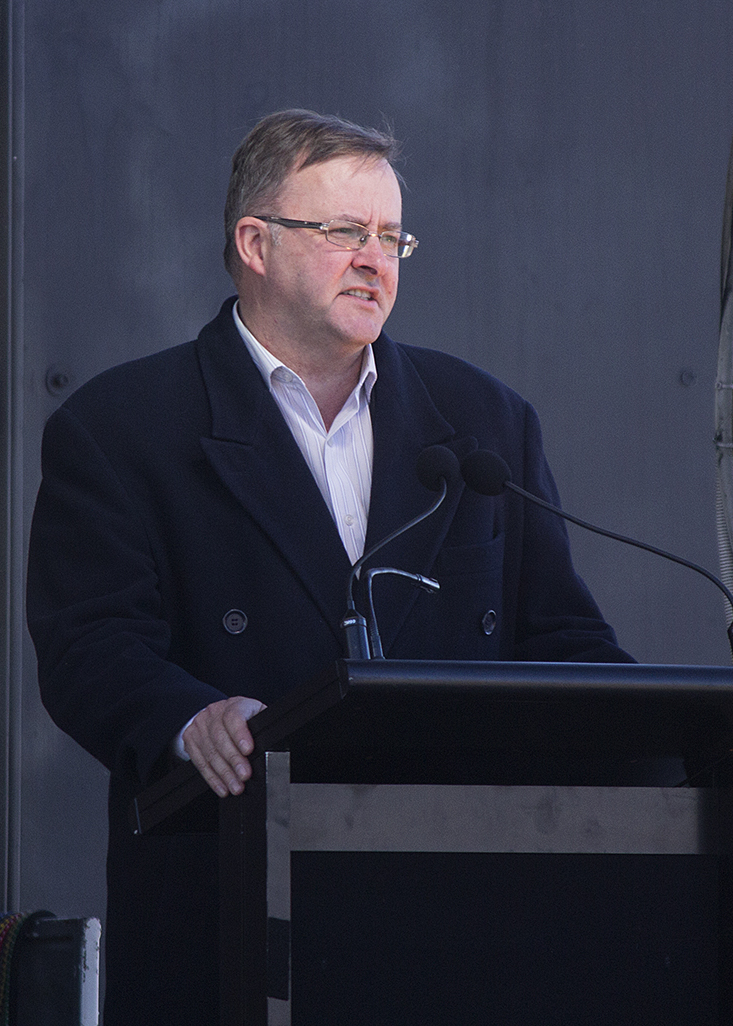
Albanese at the opening of the Holbrook Bypass in 2013

After Julia Gillard replaced Rudd as prime minister following the leadership spill in June 2010 she retained Albanese in his roles. Following the 2010 election, which resulted in a hung parliament, Albanese was a key player in negotiating the support of independent members Tony Windsor and Rob Oakeshott through his role of Leader of the House. Albanese was also responsible for managing legislation through the House in the first hung parliament since the 1940s.

In 2011, Albanese introduced two more major policy reforms. The first on urban planning drew on the work of Danish designer Jan Gehl and set out plans for urban design with better transport links and safety. The second, on shipping, was notable for gaining the approval of both the conservative Australian Shipowners Associations and the radical Maritime Union of Australia. However, he also attracted controversy when a convoy of trucks from North Queensland dubbed the "convoy of no confidence" descended on Canberra's Parliament House to protest against rising fuel costs and carbon pricing. During question time, Albanese labelled the protesters outside as "the convoy of no consequence". This caused outrage among supporters of the protest and a week later a public rally in support of the truckies was held outside Albanese's electorate office in Marrickville, New South Wales.

Following a series of poor polls, leadership instability descended again on the Labor government. Former prime minister Kevin Rudd resigned as Minister for Foreign Affairs in February 2012 to unsuccessfully challenge Julia Gillard for the leadership. Shortly before the ballot, Albanese came out in support of Rudd, stating that he had always been unhappy with the manner of Rudd's removal. He tearfully explained how he had offered his resignation as Leader of the House to the prime minister, but that she had refused to accept it, and called on Labor to cease leadership divisions and unify. In response to a question on his personal feelings around the leadership spill, he stated "I like fighting Tories. That's what I do."

=== Deputy Prime Minister of Australia ===
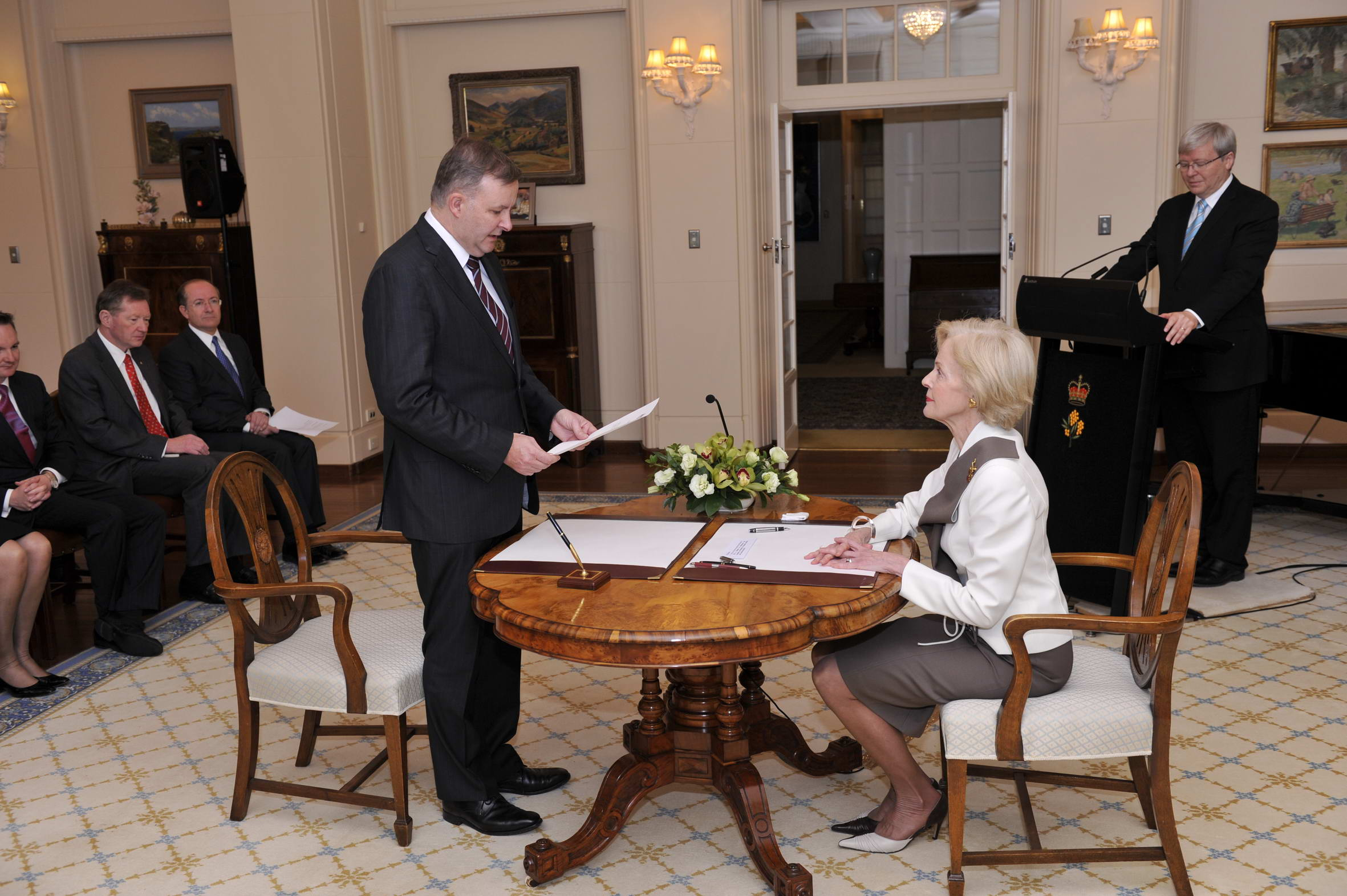
Albanese sworn in as deputy prime minister by Governor-General Quentin Bryce

In June 2013, Rudd defeated Gillard in a final leadership election. That same ballot saw Albanese elected by the caucus as Deputy Leader of the Labor Party, and the following day Albanese was sworn in as deputy prime minister. He held this role until Labor's defeat at the 2013 election, and was replaced by Warren Truss on 18 September.

== Return to Opposition ==
=== 2013 leadership election ===
Following the defeat of Labor at the 2013 election, Albanese announced his candidacy to be Leader of the Labor Party, standing against Bill Shorten. Shorten was announced as the winner after a month-long contest that was the first to involve a combined vote of MPs and rank-and-file members. Although Albanese won comfortably among party members, Shorten held a greater lead among MPs, and was subsequently elected.

=== Shorten Opposition ===
In October 2013, shortly after the leadership election, Shorten appointed Albanese Shadow Minister for Infrastructure and Transport and Shadow Minister for Tourism; he held these roles throughout Shorten's time as leader. In September 2014, Albanese was given the additional role of Shadow Minister for Cities. Following Labor's narrow loss in the 2016 federal election, it was reported by Sky News that Albanese was preparing to challenge Shorten for the leadership of the party. However, Albanese ruled out such a challenge, and Shorten was re-elected unopposed as Labor leader.

== Leader of the Opposition (2019–2022) ==
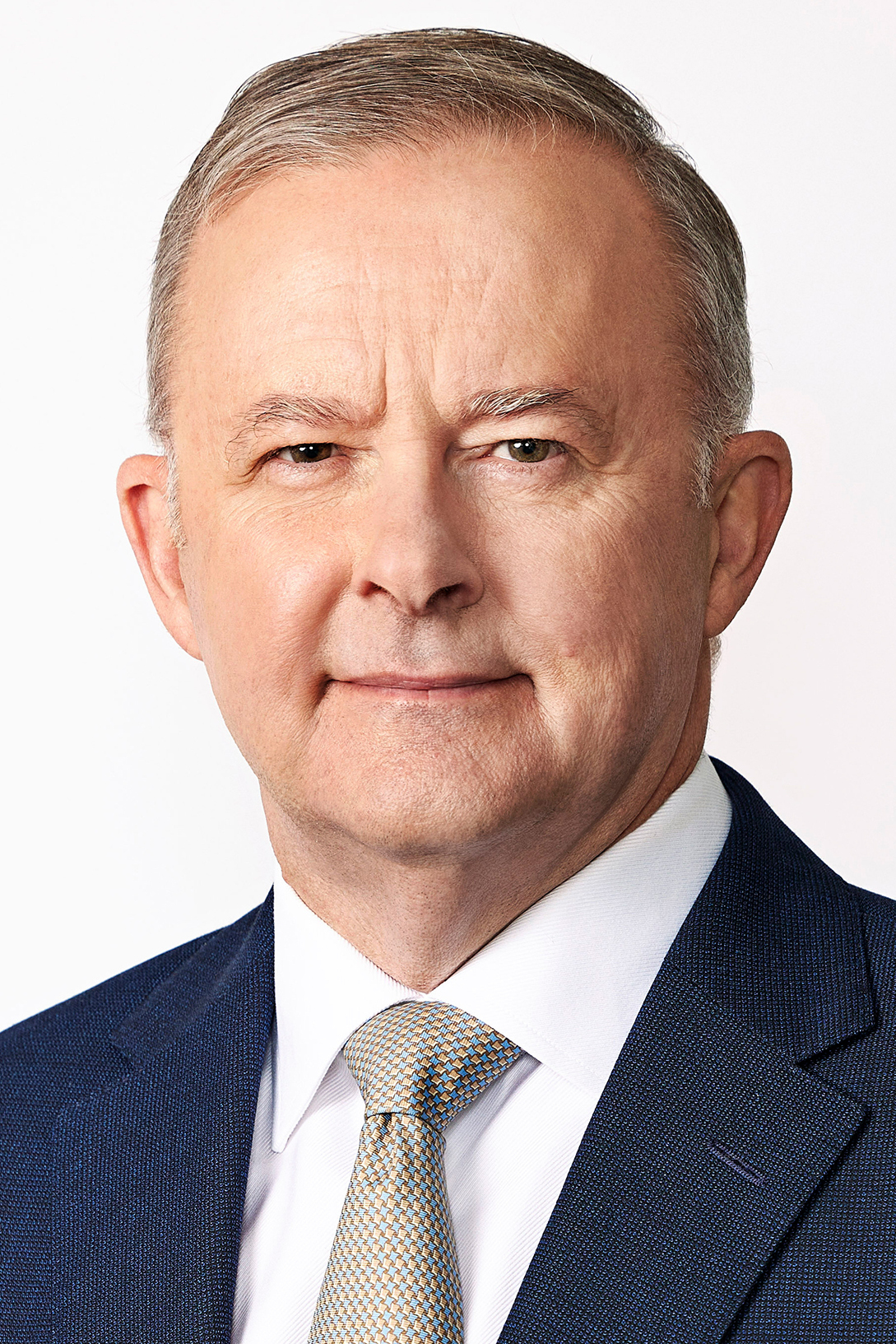
Albanese during his time as Leader of the Opposition

=== 2019 leadership election ===
Bill Shorten announced his resignation as Leader of the Labor Party on 18 May 2019, following Labor's unexpected defeat in the 2019 election. The day after, Albanese announced his candidacy in the subsequent leadership election. On 21 May, Chris Bowen announced he would also contest the ballot; however, the next day, he announced his withdrawal, citing his lack of support among the party membership. With no other candidate stepping forward, Albanese took the leadership unopposed on 30 May, with Richard Marles as his deputy. Albanese unveiled his shadow ministry on 1 June 2019.

=== Parliamentary activities ===
Under his leadership, Labor supported the Morrison government's stage three tax cuts, despite the party being earlier opposed. Albanese led the Opposition during the COVID-19 pandemic, during which he took bipartisan positions on the government's response. On 4 July 2020, Labor won the 2020 Eden-Monaro by-election, despite a swing against it. On 22 November 2021, Albanese accused prime minister Scott Morrison of lying to Parliament. In December 2021, Albanese held a major campaign rally, unveiling Labor's slogan, "A Better Future".

In February 2022, Albanese announced Labor would support the Morrison government's controversial religious discrimination bill. Labor successfully passed amendments to the bill to add protections for transgender school students after five Liberal MPs crossed the floor to vote in favour. After this, the government shelved the bill due to being unwilling to accept the amendments.

=== 2022 federal election ===
The 2022 federal election was called on 10 April. On the first day of campaigning, Albanese was unable to name either the official cash rate or unemployment rate, which drew criticism. On 20 April, Albanese faced prime minister Morrison in a debate hosted by Sky News, with Albanese being deemed the winner through an audience vote. However, the next day, Albanese tested positive for COVID-19, forcing him to isolate at home in Sydney. He returned to campaigning the following week and, on 1 May, hosted Labor's campaign launch in Perth which was the first time any major party launched in Western Australia. At the launch, Labor unveiled policies to reduce the cost of medicine and childcare, increase manufacturing in Australia, and introduce a shared equity housing scheme to assist first-time home buyers. Albanese faced Morrison in two further debates, hosted by Channel Nine and Channel Seven, respectively. Opinion polling indicated that support for the two major parties had reached record lows, due to high levels of support for minor parties and independent candidates.

At the election on 21 May 2022, Labor was victorious over the Liberal–National Coalition, with Albanese becoming the 31st prime minister of Australia. Despite a decrease in the party's primary vote, Labor received a 3.66-point two-party-preferred swing towards it. The Coalition also lost several seats to "teal independents", allowing Labor to become the party with the most seats in Parliament.

Although it was not certain on election day that Labor would win a majority of seats, it soon became apparent that no other party could realistically form a government. Accordingly, two days after the election, Albanese, deputy Labor leader Richard Marles, Jim Chalmers, Penny Wong and Katy Gallagher were sworn in as an interim five-person ministry. With his victory, Albanese became the first Italian-Australian prime minister in the country's history.

Albanese secured confidence and supply from several crossbenchers in the event that he was unable to form majority government. However, on 30 May, it was projected that Labor had won at least 76 seats, enough to win a majority for the first time at the federal level since the 2007 election.

== Prime Minister of Australia (2022–present) ==
=== First term (2022–2025) ===
==== Domestic affairs ====
===== Economy =====
Albanese's first term was dominated by Australia's cost-of-living crisis, attributed to the worldwide inflation surge of 2021–23. Monthly inflation peaked at a high of 8.4% in December 2022, and the Reserve Bank of Australia increased interest rates twelve times, reaching a rate of 4.35% by November 2023, the highest since 2011. In the 2023 Australian federal budget, the Albanese government delivered a surplus of $22.1 billion (equivalent to 0.9% of Australia's GDP); this was Australia's first budget surplus in 15 years, and the largest ever Australian budget surplus. (Note: Attributed to multiple sources:) In the 2024 budget, the government posted a second consecutive surplus of $9.3 billion. The budget returned to a $42.1 billion deficit in the 2025 budget.

In January 2024, the Albanese government made changes to the previously legislated stage three tax cuts, which would see individuals earning less than A$150,000 receive a larger tax cut than under the original plan. These changes were met with some criticism, particularly by the Opposition and conservative media outlets, and was viewed as a breach of a pre-election promise, as Albanese had repeatedly stated he would not alter the tax cuts if elected. Despite this, the changes proved popular with the public, and the overhauled tax cuts were passed by the Senate on 27 February 2024. His government announced a further $17 billion in tax cuts in the 2025 budget, which will reduce the bottom tax bracket from 16% to 15% in 2026, and to 14% in 2027.

===== Housing =====
Albanese took office amid a major housing affordability crisis, with the average Australian house price being nine times the average household income by 2024. To remedy supply-side issues that contribute to rising prices, in August 2023, Albanese reached an agreement with National Cabinet to build 1.2 million houses over five years. On 13 September 2023, the government passed the Housing Australia Future Fund (HAFF), a $10 billion investment fund controlled by the Future Fund that is designed to build 30,000 new social and affordable homes over the following five years in a further effort to increase supply. On 25 September 2024, his government instructed the Treasury to examine negative gearing. As a divisive wedge issue in Australian politics, changes to negative gearing rules were proposed by Labor prior to the 2019 election, in which they were defeated. Albanese had previously pledged not to modify negative gearing as Opposition Leader, leading to criticism from the Coalition and conservative media outlets for appearing to backtrack on this promise. After intense media speculation, Albanese ruled out making changes to negative gearing the next day. In November 2024, the Albanese government legislated a "help-to-buy" shared equity scheme that aims to allow up to 40,000 first-time home buyers to purchase a home with a shared contribution with the government, and a tax concession to incentivise developers to build houses specifically for the purpose of renting. In February 2025, his government placed a two-year ban on non-citizens buying existing houses.

In the 2025 Australian federal election campaign, housing affordability and its link to immigration were central points of contention between Albanese and Opposition Leader Peter Dutton.

===== Manufacturing =====
In March 2023, Parliament passed the government's National Reconstruction Fund (NRF), a $15 billion investment fund for the manufacturing sector designed to increase manufacturing capability. In November 2024, the NRF made its first investment, a $40 million grant to a Queensland-based mining equipment company. In April 2024, Albanese announced a major industrial policy called Future Made in Australia, which seeks to promote Australian manufacturing in sustainable energy. Future Made in Australia has been likened to the United States' Inflation Reduction Act and the European Green Deal.

As part of the policy, the government's third budget contained $22.7 billion over a decade in support of domestic green hydrogen, solar-panel manufacturing, and mining of critical minerals. This includes a $1 billion "Solar Sunshot" program to support solar panel manufacturing in Australia, and a $566 million "Resourcing Australia's Prosperity" initiative for geomapping for mining resources. In July 2024, his government introduced legislation to give further effect to the policy, which passed the Parliament in November 2024.

===== Environment and energy =====
Albanese campaigned on renewable energy and reducing carbon emissions during the 2022 election, pledging to set a target to reduce emissions by 43% on 2005 levels and increase the share of renewable energy in the electricity market to 82% by 2030. On 16 June 2022, Albanese submitted a new Nationally determined contribution to the United Nations which formally committed Australia to reducing carbon emissions by 43%, an increase from the 26 to 28% target under the previous government. In September 2022, the Albanese government passed legislation to write this climate target into law. Albanese's government also entered a bid for Australia and its Pacific island neighbours to host the 2024 United Nations Climate Change Conference. Albanese supported a major expansion of gas production to support renewables in the energy grid. In December 2024, he approved the expansion of four coal mines. He declared that he would not lift the moratorium on nuclear power in Australia.

In late 2022, his government announced reforms to the "safeguard mechanism", an emissions trading scheme that requires Australia's largest carbon emitters to keep their emissions under a "baseline limit", either by reducing them, or by purchasing carbon credits. The mechanism was introduced by the Turnbull government in 2016, but failed to reduce emissions as the rules were often left unenforced. In March 2023, the Albanese government received the necessary support to pass the legislation from the Greens, who negotiated a "hard cap" on emissions that cannot be offset by carbon credits. The bill was passed on 30 March 2023, marking the most significant piece of climate change legislation passed through the Australian parliament since the Clean Energy Act 2011. On 5 October 2023, Australia re-joined the United Nations' Green Climate Fund, which the previous Morrison government had withdrawn from in 2018. In December 2023, the government legislated a "nature repair market" to create a biodiversity market to encourage private companies to invest in projects that protect biodiversity, and committed to establishing a federal environmental protection agency (EPA). However, the legislation to establish an EPA was delayed after lobbying from the mining sector and the state government of Western Australia, attracting criticism from environmental groups. In May 2024, the government legislated a vehicle emission standard for new vehicles sold in Australia from 1 July 2025, in an effort to introduce more fuel efficient vehicles to the Australian market.

Albanese's government took office during a massive surge in electricity prices exacerbated by the global energy crisis and the Russo-Ukrainian War. On 9 December 2022, Albanese convened a meeting of the National Cabinet and announced a coordinated plan to introduce temporary caps on gas and coal prices. On 15 December, Albanese recalled Parliament to pass a 12-month cap on gas prices to limit electricity price rises.

===== Industrial relations =====
In one of his first acts as prime minister on 27 May 2022, Albanese confirmed that his government would make a submission to the Fair Work Commission in support of an increase to the national minimum wage. On 2 June 2023, the Albanese government contributed to a decision by the Fair Work Commission with another letter encouraging a rise in the minimum wage in line with inflation. The government announced that a submission had been formally made to the commission on 3 June 2022 and that a "deliberate" policy of lower wages was not the policy of the new government. The Fair Work Commission subsequently announced on 15 June 2022 that the minimum wage would be raised by 5.2%.

The government passed new workplace harassment laws through the Parliament on 28 November 2022. The new laws are in line with Albanese's promise to implement the recommendations of the Respect@Work Report by creating a positive duty requiring employers to implement measures to prevent sexual harassment.

On 2 December 2022, the government passed its Secure Jobs, Better Pay law through the Parliament. The new law allows unions to negotiate multi-employer pay deals in an effort to secure wage increases across particular sectors such as child care and aged care. The law also aims to close the gender pay gap by prohibiting pay secrecy employment clauses and secures the right of workers to seek flexible working arrangements.

Throughout 2023, the Albanese government attempted to pass additional industrial relations reforms through Parliament, dubbed the Closing Loopholes bill, which aimed to ensure temporary workers employed through labour hire were paid the same wage as regular workers, criminalise wage theft and make companies responsible for industrial manslaughter, among other changes. Despite fierce opposition from the Liberal Party and business lobbies, the first part of the bill was passed by the Senate on 7 December 2023. The second tranche of legislation, which introduced minimum standards for gig workers and allowed workers the right to disconnect, was passed on 8 February 2024.

===== Indigenous affairs =====
In his victory speech on election night, Albanese expressed his support for the Uluru Statement from the Heart, and stated that his government would implement it in full within its first term. In his first press conference as Prime Minister, the podium flags in the blue room at Parliament were changed to include Indigenous and Torres Strait Islander flags in addition to the Australian flag. Upon the opening of the new Parliament, both flags began to be displayed in the House of Representatives and Senate chambers. Albanese pledged to hold a referendum to enshrine an Indigenous Voice to Parliament to assist the government with Indigenous issues, and recognise Indigenous Australians in Australia's constitution. The 2023 Australian Indigenous Voice referendum was held on 14 October and the change to the Constitution was rejected by the majority of Australian voters and passed in no state or territory, bar the Australian Capital Territory. In August 2024, Albanese abandoned his commitment to implement the remaining components of the Uluru Statement.

===== Immigration =====
On 25 May 2022, in one of its first acts upon coming to government, the Albanese government allowed the Murugappan family to stay in Australia after the previous Morrison government had attempted to deport them. In February 2023, the Albanese government abolished temporary protection visas, allowing up to 19,000 asylum seekers to stay in Australia permanently. On 8 November 2023, the High Court of Australia ruled on NZYQ v Minister for Immigration, striking down the precedent established by Al-Kateb v Godwin and holding that indefinite detention of immigrants was illegal, leading to the immediate release of 148 people, some of whom had committed serious crimes. In response, the government enacted emergency legislation to put those released under strict visa conditions − including mandating the use of ankle monitoring and a mandatory curfew – and establish a preventive detention scheme to re-detain people who were found to pose a high risk to the community. However, in November 2024, the High Court would also find these laws unconstitutional, striking them down on the grounds they were too punitive. To circumvent this ruling, Albanese's government unveiled legislation that gave the federal government comprehensive powers to deport non-citizens. Despite vociferous criticism from human rights and refugee advocacy groups, the necessary bills passed on 29 November 2024.

In 2023–24, the number of migrant arrivals decreased to 667,000, down from 739,000 a year earlier. Net overseas migration was 536,000 in 2022–23, up from 170,900 in 2021–22. On 11 December 2023, the Albanese government announced its ten-year migration strategy designed to overhaul the immigration system and reduce Australia's annual net migration intake to 250,000 by June 2025. His government also announced it would introduce caps on the annual intake of international students, but attempts to pass these into law were blocked by the Opposition and the Greens in Parliament. Net permanent and long-term arrivals in the 12 months to May 2024 were a record 482,450.

===== Social media =====
In June 2024, Albanese pledged to introduce legislation that would force social media companies to ensure users under 16 years old could not create accounts, in an effort to curb the negative effects of social media on children. This plan was criticised by industry groups and major social media companies such as Meta (parent company of Facebook). The Online Safety Amendment (Social Media Minimum Age) Act 2024 was passed by Parliament on 28 November 2024, making Australia the first country in the world to legislate a minimum age for social media use. The ban commenced on 10 December 2025. Albanese's government attempted to pass laws that would have compelled social media companies to regulate misinformation on their platforms, but abandoned them after they failed to find support in Parliament.

===== Healthcare =====
In May 2023, Albanese's government invested $3.5 billion to triple the fee general practitioners receive for bulk billing their patients in order to address the decline in rates of bulk billing. In February 2025, Albanese committed his government to invest $8.5 billion in Medicare services including $18 million in subsidised general practitioner's visits, 400 nursing scholarships and general practitioner training programs for 2,000 doctors. The Albanese government implemented an election promise to fund non-emergency urgent care clinics, opening up 58 across every state and territory by the beginning of 2024.

===== Aged care and childcare =====
The first bill Albanese's government passed was one responding to the 17 recommendations of the Royal Commission into Aged Care Quality and Safety. The legislation amended the aged care funding model and introduces new reporting and transparency requirements. The government passed reforms to aged care in November 2024 to increase funding for home care and cut down waiting times for new entrants into aged cared facilities. In March 2025, Albanese and his government passed legislation to subsidise the cost of childcare for most families and guarantee a minimum of three days of subsidised care.

===== Government integrity =====
In November 2022, Albanese's government fulfilled its election commitment to legislate the National Anti-Corruption Commission (NACC), with the commission commencing on 1 July 2023.

Following the revelation that former prime minister Scott Morrison had secretly sworn himself into several ministerial positions, Albanese and his government successfully moved a censure motion against him in November 2022.

Albanese's government abolished the Administrative Appeals Tribunal (AAT) and replaced it with the Administrative Review Tribunal (ART), with attorney-general Mark Dreyfus stating the AAT had been "compromised" by political appointees. The ART commenced operations in October 2024, with a new merits-based process for appointing members.

==== Foreign affairs ====
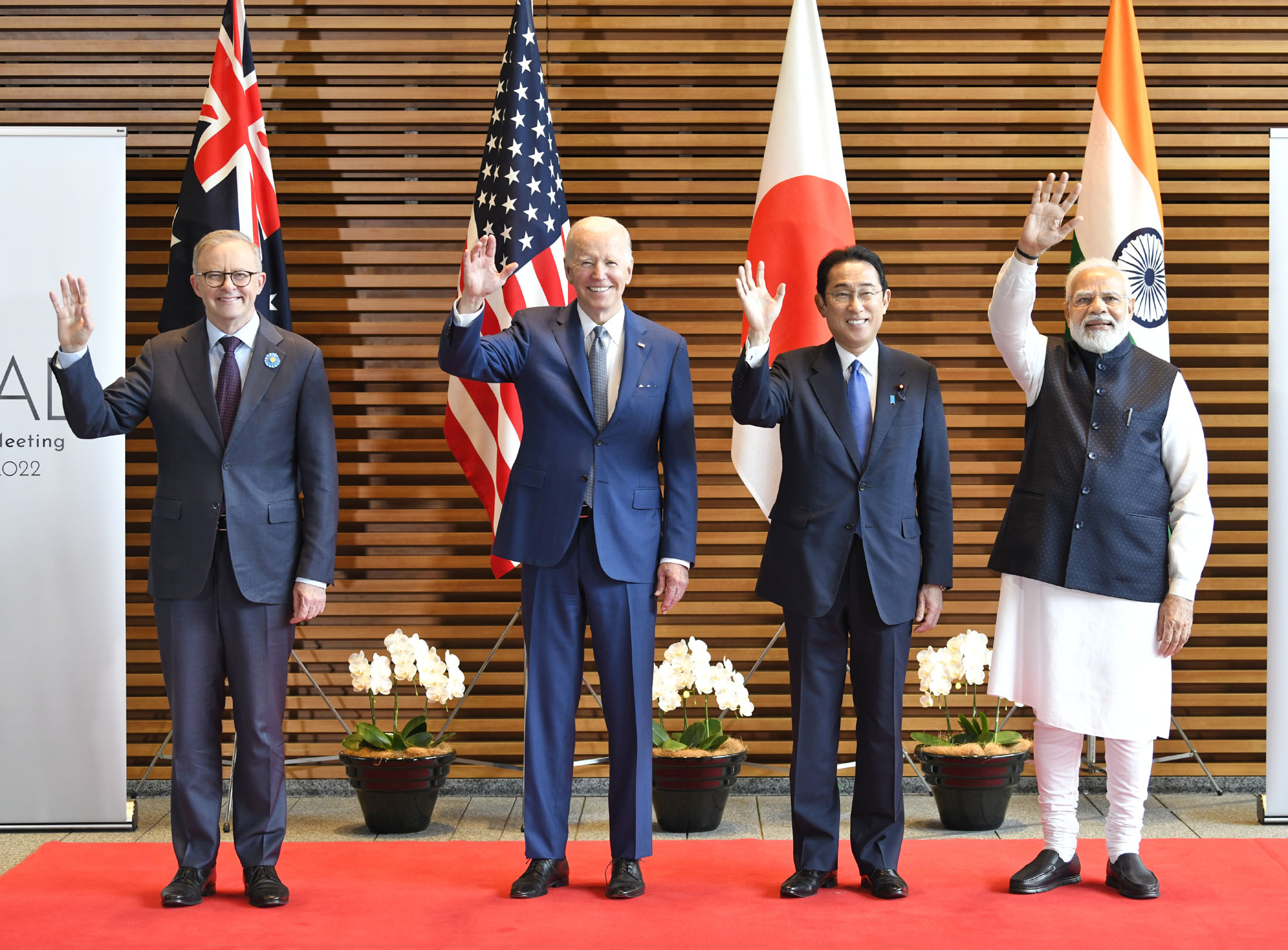
On the same day he was sworn in as prime minister, Albanese attended his first overseas trip: the Quadrilateral Security Dialogue meeting with US president Joe Biden, Indian prime minister Narendra Modi and Japanese prime minister Fumio Kishida.

Albanese took his first international trip on 23 May 2022 immediately after being sworn in as prime minister when he flew to Tokyo to attend a Quadrilateral Security Dialogue meeting with fellow world leaders: US president Joe Biden, Indian prime minister Narendra Modi and Japanese prime minister Fumio Kishida. At the meeting, Albanese committed his new government to the goals of the Quad and confirmed that his government would seek to take stronger action in reducing carbon emissions. On 5 June, Albanese and Penny Wong visited Indonesian president Joko Widodo in Jakarta to develop Australia–Indonesia relations. Albanese said he would not "publicly intervene" to prevent WikiLeaks founder Julian Assange from being extradited to the United States. Instead, he and his government engaged in what was dubbed "quiet diplomacy" with the United States, including raising the issue directly with president Biden. Assange was released from custody after striking a plea deal in June 2024. Barrister Greg Barns, who acted as a legal advisor to Assange, credited Albanese's government as "instrumental" to Assange's release.

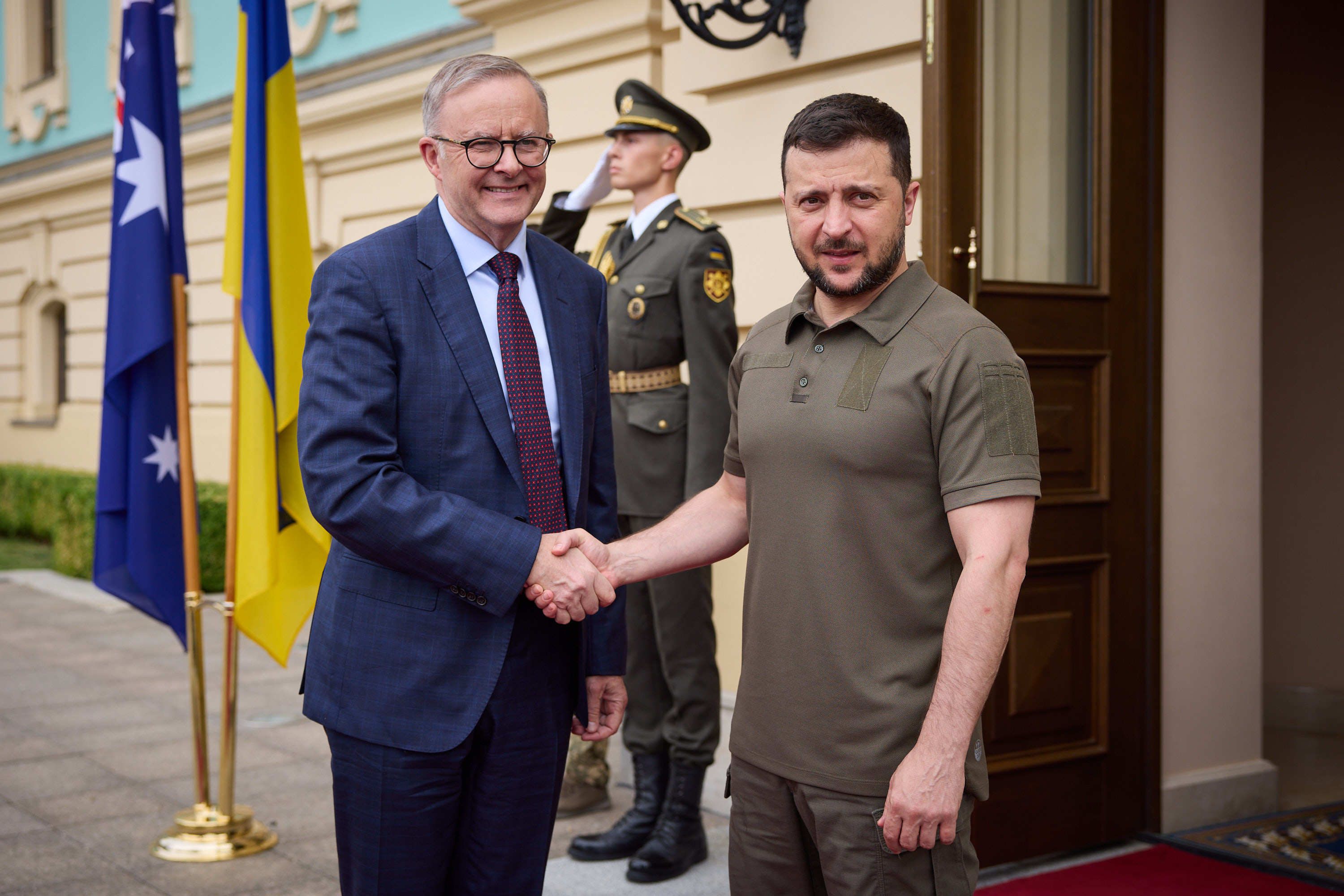
Albanese visiting Ukrainian president Volodymyr Zelenskyy in Kyiv

Later in June, Albanese attended the 2022 NATO Madrid summit to discuss security threats facing the Pacific region. On 30 June, Albanese met with French president Emmanuel Macron in Paris to "reset" Australia–France relations, which had been damaged following the cancellation of a submarine deal by the preceding government. The next day, Albanese travelled to Ukraine to meet with President Volodymyr Zelenskyy, making him the first Australian prime minister to make a diplomatic visit to Ukraine. Albanese pledged a further $100 million in aid to assist with the ongoing Russo-Ukrainian War.

On 26 September 2022, Albanese travelled to Japan to attend the state funeral of former prime minister Shinzo Abe.

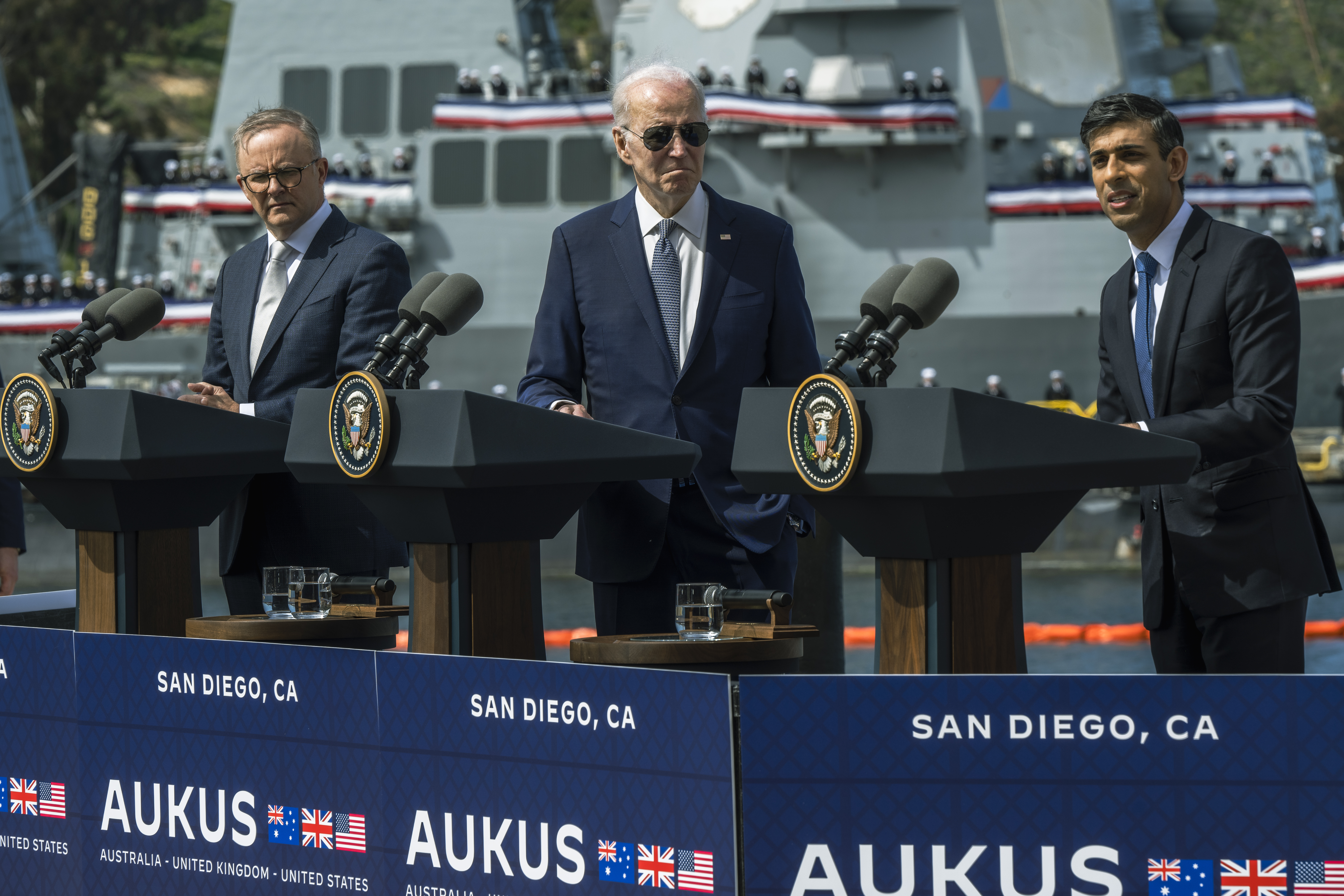
Albanese (far left), Joe Biden and Rishi Sunak at an AUKUS summit in March 2023

The relationship between Australia and China has started to improve since Albanese became prime minister. In November 2022, Albanese held a bilateral meeting with Chinese President Xi Jinping, bringing an end to the longest diplomatic freeze in 50 years between Australia and China. In early 2023, China ended its unofficial ban on imports of Australian coal, with all restrictions reportedly being lifted by 14 March. China agreed to lift its ban on barley imports from Australia in April, and imports of Australian timber in May, further improving the relations.

In February 2023, Albanese hosted his New Zealand counterpart Chris Hipkins, who undertook his first official visit. While the two leaders reaffirmed Australian-New Zealand bilateral relations, they also discussed the controversial Section 501 deportation policy. Albanese confirmed that his government would amend the deportation policy to take into account individuals' connections to Australia and the length of time they had lived in the country.

In March 2023, Albanese visited India to attend the Australia-India Annual Leaders' Summit in New Delhi. During the visit, he also led a trade delegation, which included Trade Minister Don Farrell and Resources Minister Madeleine King, after the implementation of the Economic Cooperation and Trade Agreement (ECTA) between Australia and India on 29 December 2022. He also attended the 75 Years of Friendship through Cricket Event hosted by PM Modi at the Narendra Modi Stadium in Ahmedabad to celebrate 75 years of strong diplomatic and cricketing ties between the two nations. The PMs attended a match of the Border–Gavaskar Trophy where Albanese handed over Australian Cricket Captain Steve Smith his test cap.

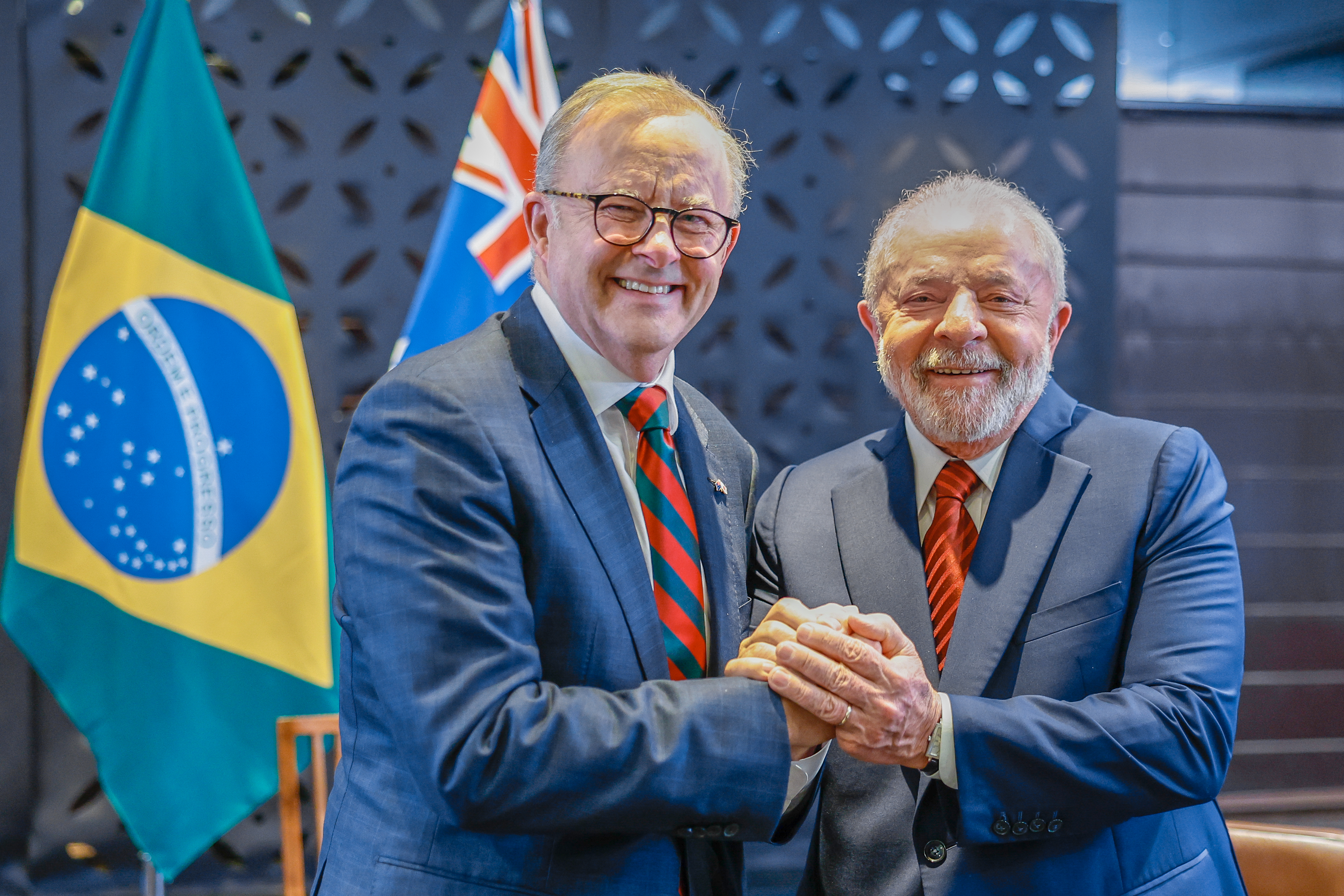
Albanese (left) with Brazilian president Luiz Inácio Lula da Silva (right) at the 49th G7 summit

On 13 March 2023, Albanese travelled to San Diego to officially commence the AUKUS security pact with President Biden and United Kingdom prime minister Rishi Sunak. Through the deal, which was signed by Albanese's predecessor, Australia will procure $368 billion worth of defence materiel, including nuclear-powered submarines in an effort to counter China's dominance in the Indo-Pacific region. The deal has been negatively received by China and former prime minister Paul Keating, who called it the "worst deal in all history".

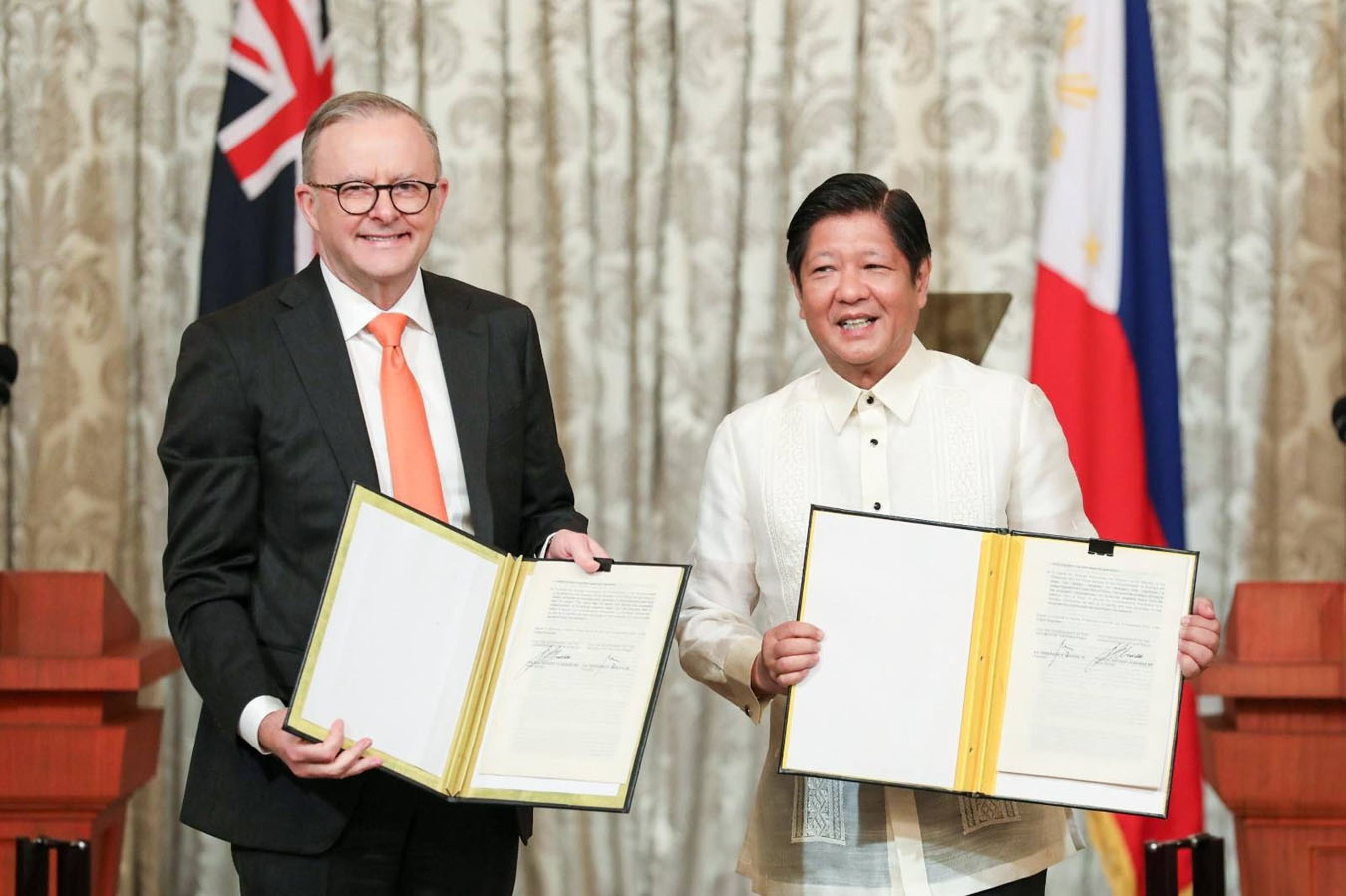
Albanese with Philippine president Bongbong Marcos during his visit to Manila

Australia–Philippines relations upgraded to a strategic partnership when Albanese visited Manila on 8 September 2023, the first bilateral visit to the Philippines by an Australian prime minister in two decades. He and President Bongbong Marcos agreed for their defence ministers to meet annually due to "rising security challenges" in the Indo-Pacific. In August 2025, Australian and Philippine forces conducted a bilateral military exercise in Palawan involving over 3,600 personnel—Australia's largest deployment of troops to Southeast Asia since the 2006 crisis in Timor-Leste—near contested areas of the South China Sea.

Between 4 and 7 November 2023, Albanese visited Shanghai and Beijing, becoming the first Australian prime minister to visit China in seven years. The trip, described as an effort to get relations between Australia and China on track, coincided with the 50th anniversary of Prime Minister Gough Whitlam's visit to China, the first by an Australian prime minister. During the trip, Albanese gave a speech at the China International Import Expo, and met with Premier Li Qiang and President Xi Jinping. The following week, he signed the Falepili Union treaty with the Pacific island country of Tuvalu. Described as "groundbreaking" by legal scholar Jane McAdam, the treaty entrenches bilateral relations between the two countries, with Australia agreeing to provide funds to help the country deal with the effects of climate change and also resettle 280 Tuvaluans a year, as the country is particularly vulnerable to the effects of climate change.

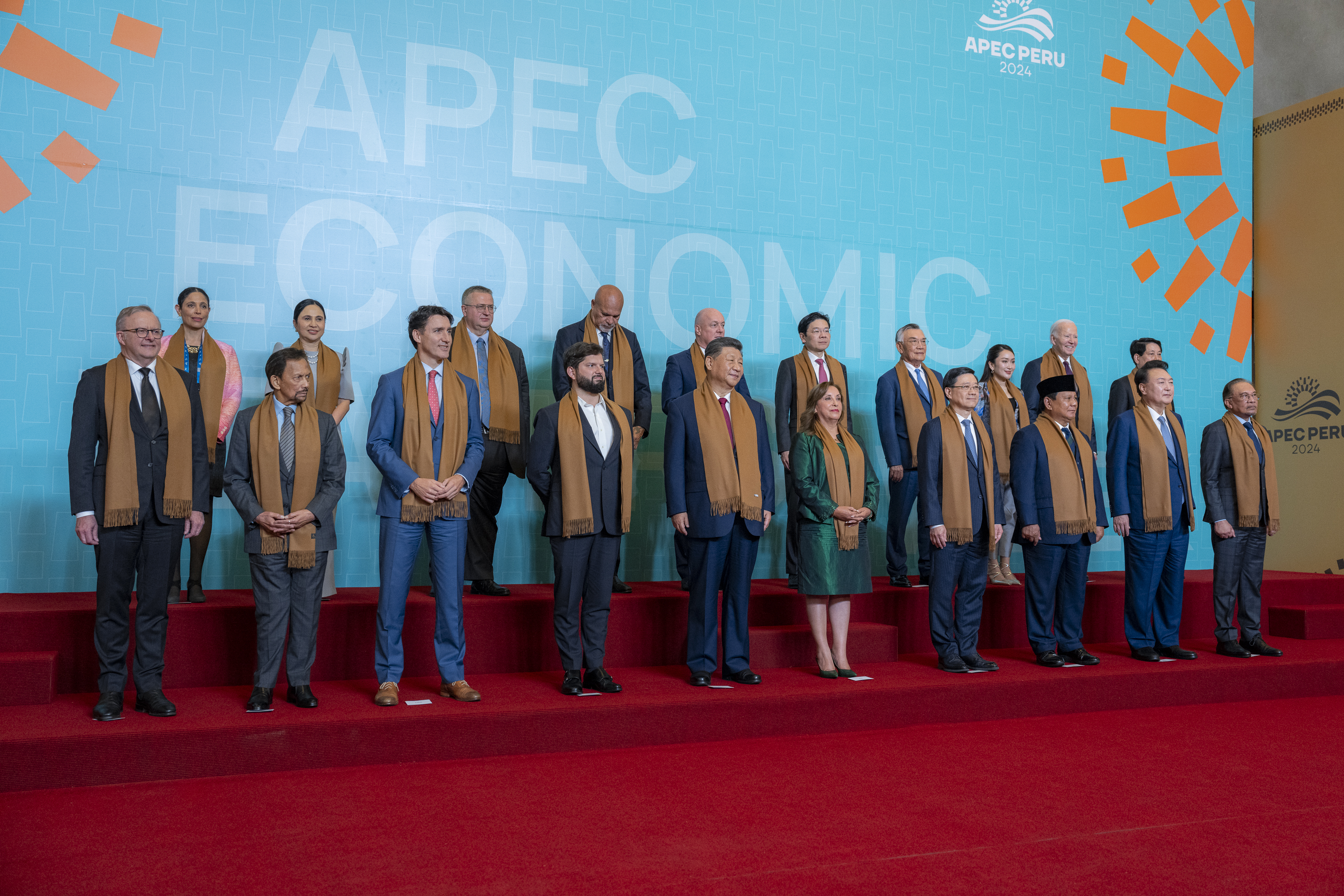
Albanese, Joe Biden, Prabowo Subianto, Xi Jinping and other leaders at the APEC Summit in Lima, 16 November 2024

In March 2024, Albanese was referred to the International Criminal Court (ICC) by Birchgrove Legal as an accessory to genocide for his government's actions during the Gaza War, which included freezing funding to UNRWA, providing military aid to Israel, and allowing Australian citizens to serve in the IDF. The document, which was signed by over 100 Australian lawyers and barristers, made Albanese the first Western leader to be referred to the ICC in the context of the Gaza War.

In April 2024, Albanese told Israeli Prime Minister Benjamin Netanyahu that Australians were outraged by the death of an Australian citizen in Israel's attack on aid workers in Gaza. Albanese condemned the Iranian strikes in Israel and reiterated the necessity for sanctions against Iran. Following the Israeli attacks on the Gaza Strip in March 2025, Albanese called on all parties to respect the ceasefire and the hostage agreement.

In August 2024, Albanese and Indonesian President-elect and Defense Minister Prabowo Subianto announced a new defence cooperation agreement to strengthen Australia–Indonesia security ties.

=== 2025 federal election ===
On 28 March 2025, Albanese called a federal election for 3 May. The first week of campaigning was dominated by the imposition of tariffs on Australia by U.S. President Donald Trump, to which Albanese responded by urging Australians to buy locally made products. He participated in a Sky News debate against Opposition Leader Peter Dutton on 8 April, which he narrowly won according to a poll of 100 undecided voters interviewed by Sky. He took part in three further debates with Dutton over the course of the campaign. On 13 April, Albanese launched Labor's campaign, announcing flagship policies to aid first home-buyers by allowing them to buy a house with a five percent deposit and build 100,000 homes exclusively for first-time home purchasers. The predominant issues of the campaign were cost-of-living, housing affordability, healthcare and immigration.

Albanese led his government to a landslide victory at the election, defying a global anti-incumbency surge and becoming the first prime minister since John Howard at the 2004 election to lead his government to re-election. Several media outlets attributed Albanese's victory to anti-Donald Trump sentiment and drew parallels to the 2025 Canadian federal election, which saw similar results for the incumbent Canadian Liberal Party. Labor gained 17 seats to hold a total of 94 seats in the House of Representatives, the joint most seats ever held by a party in federal Parliament, tied with Howard's Coalition government in the 1996 election. Labor also retained every seat they occupied prior to the election, making Albanese's government the first to retain all of its seats since Harold Holt's Coalition in 1966. The second Albanese ministry was sworn in on 13 May 2025.

=== Second term (2025–present) ===
==== Domestic affairs ====
===== Housing =====
On 1 October 2025, Albanese's government fulfilled an election commitment by expanding a pre-existing scheme to allow first-time home buyers to purchase a home with a five percent deposit, in an effort to address Australia's growing housing crisis. However, economists and figures in the real estate industry noted that the scheme will likely cause property prices to increase further due to heightened demand. In the 2026 federal budget, the Albanese government enacted reforms to capital gains tax (CGT) and negative gearing, limiting negative gearing to new residential builds and replacing the capital gains tax discount with an inflation-indexation model for future gains, while grandfathering existing investments. These measures, designed to address the growing housing crisis by disincentivising tax breaks primarily used by investors, led to criticism from media outlets and conservative opponents that Albanese had breached his pre-election commitment to not modify either negative gearing or CGT; Albanese defended his government's decision as "not the easy thing" but insisted it was "the right thing" to "help people get into a home of their own".

===== Education =====
Albanese pledged his first act in his second term would be to reduce tertiary education loans by 20%. Legislation to put this reduction into effect passed on 31 July 2025. The Albanese government made further reforms to the tertiary education system in 2026, establishing an independent body called the Australian Tertiary Education Commission, introducing caps on university enrolments to reduce competition at major universities and increasing funding to enable more students from low-socioeconomic backgrounds and regional areas to study at university. In July 2026, Albanese announced an expansion to the government's "Paid Prac" scheme, enabling students studying a variety of healthcare related degrees to access a payment while undertaking their work practicum, alongside students studying teaching, nursing, midwifery and social work who were covered by the program's initial scope.

===== Environment, energy and climate change =====
In his second ministry, Albanese created the new role of Special Envoy for Climate Change Adaptation and Resilience, appointing Kate Thwaites as its inaugural holder. On 18 September 2025, Albanese announced his government's 2035 emissions reduction target, set at a range of 62 to 70%. He also announced new supports for industries to decarbonise. In November 2025, the Albanese government passed legislation to overhaul Australia's main environmental and biodiversity law, the Environment Protection and Biodiversity Conservation Act 1999, and create the National Environmental Protection Agency (NEPA) after failing to do so in its first term. Following the 2026 Strait of Hormuz crisis which strained global supply chains of oil and caused a worldwide energy crisis, Albanese negotiated agreements with several countries in the Indo-Pacific region to bolster fuel supplies. In April 2026, he refused to introduce a tax on gas exporters in spite of internal party pressure and widespread public support, arguing increasing taxes on resources during the Hormuz crisis would not be appropriate.

===== Health =====
In November 2025, the government established the Centre for Disease Control as a permanent agency, having previously formed it as an interim body in January 2024.

===== Bondi Beach shooting =====
In response to the 2025 Bondi Beach shooting, where Islamic State sympathisers killed 15 people during a celebration of the Jewish holiday of Hanukkah, the Albanese government legislated reforms to hate speech and gun laws in January 2026, increasing penalties for hate crimes, tightening the eligibility for gun ownership and bringing in new powers enabling the government and the Australian Security Intelligence Organisation (ASIO) to proscribe and ban hate groups. Following public pressure, Albanese announced a Royal Commission on Antisemitism and Social Cohesion on 9 January 2026.

==== Foreign affairs ====
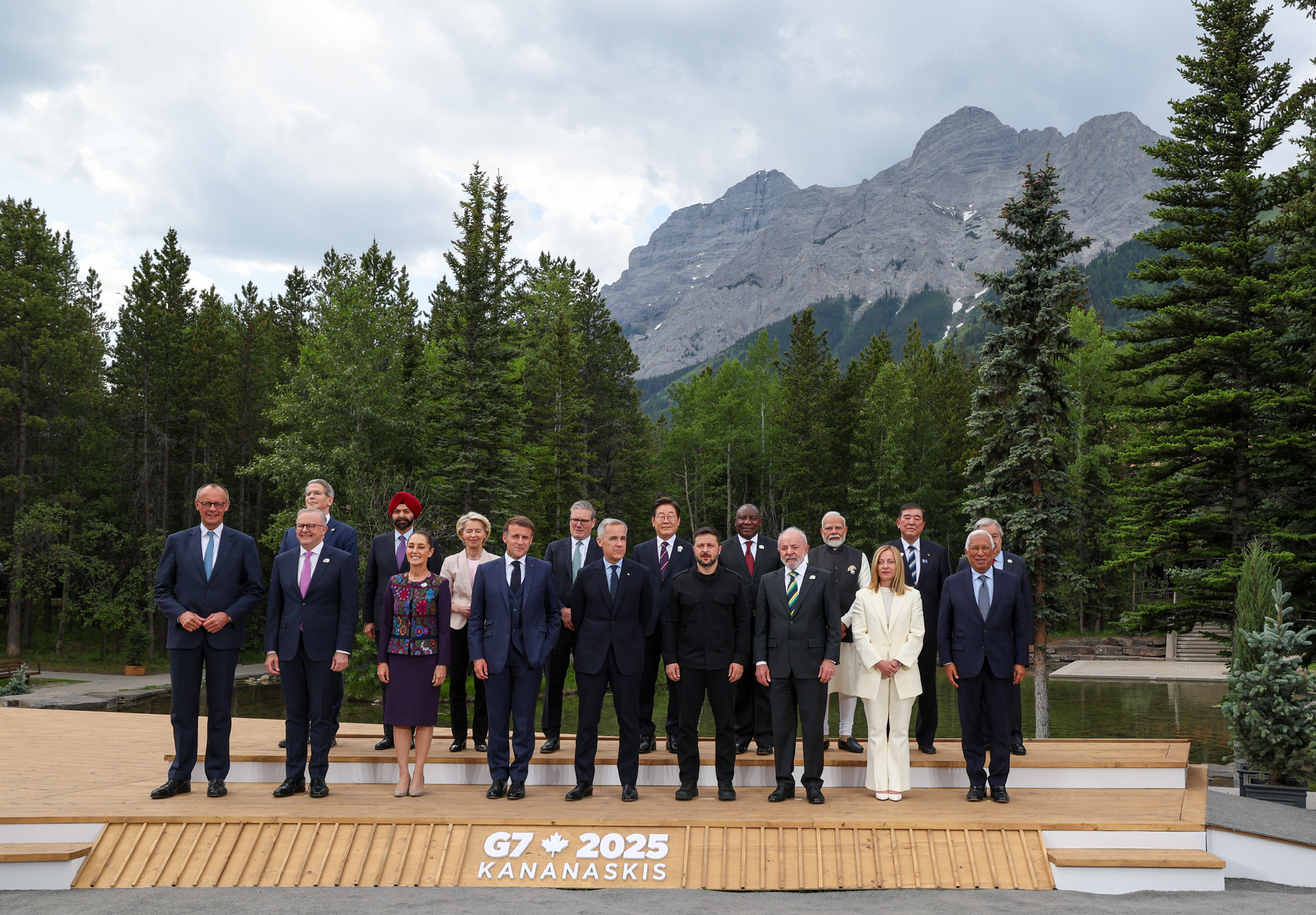
Albanese in attendance with other world leaders at the 51st G7 summit, June 2025

On 14 May 2025, Albanese made his fourth prime ministerial visit to Indonesia, meeting with President Prabowo Subianto to discuss defence and trade issues. On 19 May, he attended the papal inauguration of Pope Leo XIV, holding a private meeting with the Pope and inviting him to visit Australia at some point in the future.

Albanese's press conference with US President Donald Trump, 20 October 2025

In May 2025, Albanese echoed criticisms from other Western nations in demanding Israel allow the supply of humanitarian aid into the Gaza Strip, condemning Israel's actions as "completely unacceptable" and an "outrage". However, he opposed sanctions against Israel over the blockade of Gaza, saying he was focusing on "peace and security for both Israelis and Palestinians" rather than "soundbites".

In June 2025, Albanese attended the 51st G7 summit, where he was due to meet with President Trump. However, their scheduled meeting was cancelled after Trump left the summit early to deal with increasing escalations in the Iran–Israel war. He voiced support for US strikes on Iranian nuclear sites, but insisted that it was "unilateral action taken by the United States". That month, Albanese delivered a speech asserting the need for Australia to pursue its own interests and not be "shackled to the past", which was considered by many commentators to be an attempt to distance Australia from United States foreign policy. Albanese had his first meeting with Trump at the White House on 20 October 2025, and signed a trade agreement to export critical minerals to the United States, which was regarded as an action intended to counter China's dominance in the market.

In July 2025, Albanese went on a six-day visit to China, touring Shanghai, Beijing, and Chengdu. The visit included a trip to the Great Wall and a panda breeding center, which drew criticism from the Coalition. Albanese responded by saying that the visits were intended to show respect to China. According to critics, Albanese ignored the issue of human rights in China and focused only on trade.

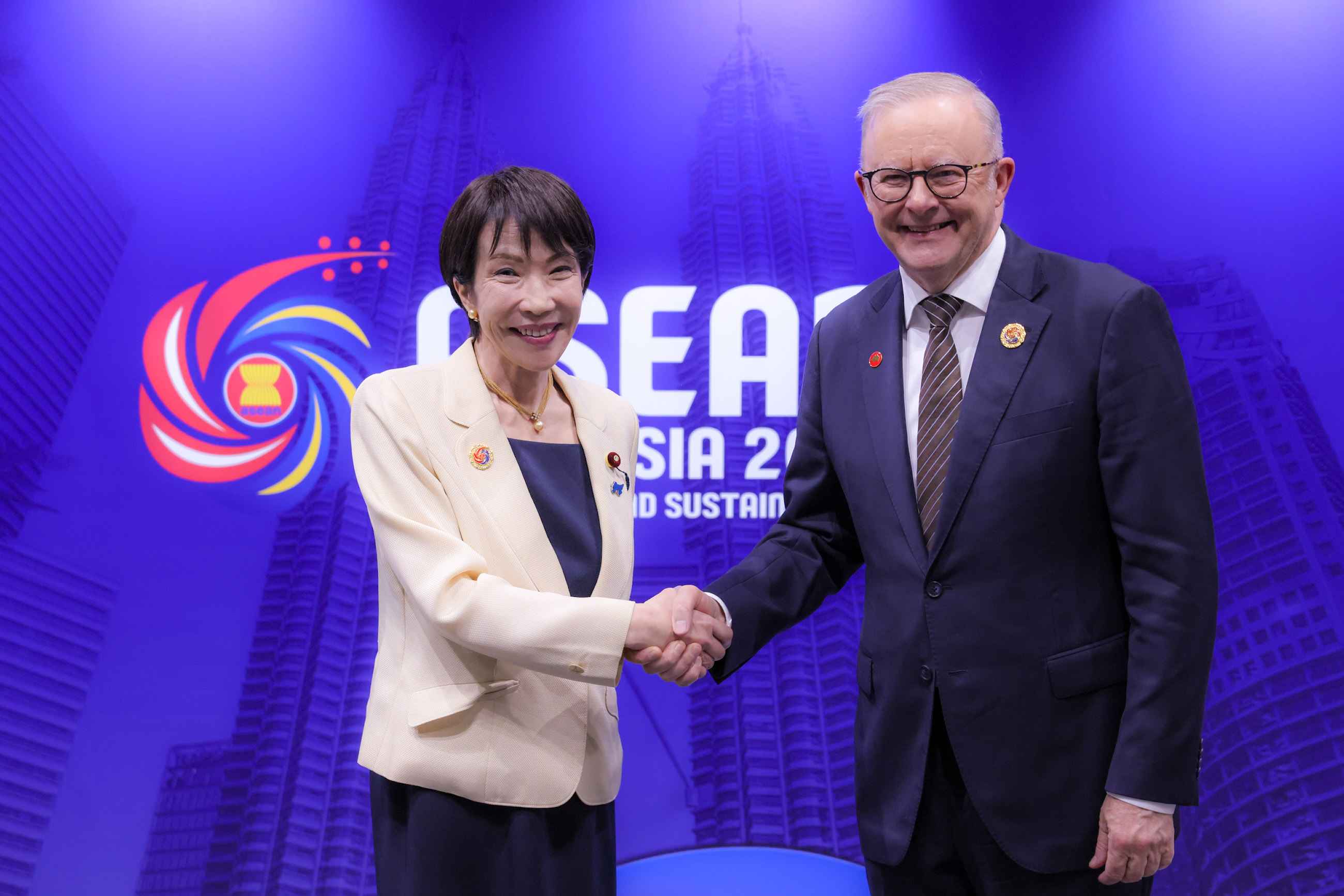
Albanese with Japanese Prime Minister Sanae Takaichi at the 47th ASEAN Summit in Malaysia, 26 October 2025

Between 9 and 10 August 2025, Albanese visited New Zealand prime minister Christopher Luxon in Queenstown for an annual bilateral head of government meeting. During the visit, the two heads of government reiterated calls for a ceasefire in the Gaza war and condemned Israel's plan to occupy Gaza City. In addition, the two heads of government discussed various bilateral trade, defence issues and Australia's 501 deportation policy. The two leaders also laid wreaths at a memorial to fallen ANZAC soldiers in Arrowtown on 10 August. On 11 August 2025, Albanese declared that Australia would formally recognise Palestine as a state at the eightieth session of the United Nations General Assembly. In August 2025, the Greens urged the Albanese government to impose direct sanctions on senior members of Netanyahu's government and to stop supplying parts for F-35 fighter jets to the global supply chain that can be accessed by Israel.

In 2025, the Albanese government faced increasing pressure to review or suspend arms exports to the United Arab Emirates (UAE) amid allegations that the UAE was providing military support to the Rapid Support Forces (RSF) in Sudan, which have been accused of committing war crimes and acts of genocide. The UAE is Australia's largest export market for weapons and ammunition. Over a five-year period, Australia exported nearly AUD 300 million worth of arms and munitions to the UAE.

In mid-February 2026, Albanese announced that the federal government would not facilitate the repatriation of ISIS-linked families from Syria on security grounds, stating "if you make your bed, you lie in it."

On 28 February 2026, Albanese, in a joint statement with Foreign Minister Penny Wong and Defence Minister Richard Marles, announced Australia's support for US and Israeli strikes against Iran, citing the need to prevent the regime from obtaining nuclear weapons and to counter its regional influence. On 24 March 2026, Australia finalised a free trade agreement with the European Union (EU), concluding negotiations that had taken place between the two since June 2018.

== Political views ==
Albanese has described his political views as progressive, and is aligned with the Labor Left faction within the Labor Party. Once described as "a leading figure of NSW Labor's minority Hard Left faction", several journalists and analysts have noted his ideological shift toward centrism since becoming Labor leader. In May 2025, he described his ideology as "progressive patriotism", and has further explained his government as occupying the "radical centre".

Albanese is a republican, and supports replacing Australia's current constitutional monarchy. In a debate to mark the Queen's Platinum Jubilee, he told the Australian Parliament, "Even many Australians who do not hold with the principle of monarchy feel regard for her. You can be a republican, as I am, and still have the deepest respect for the Queen. She has done her duty with fidelity, integrity, humanity and, as she sometimes lets slip, a sly sense of humour." He stated his desire to give constitutional recognition to Indigenous Australians, and pledged to hold a referendum regarding an Indigenous Voice to Parliament upon becoming prime minister. He stated that this recognition should come before any referendum regarding Australia's status as a constitutional monarchy vs. a republic. The Indigenous Voice to Parliament referendum occurred on 14 October 2023 and was defeated. Following a meeting with King Charles III in September 2025, he ruled out holding a republic referendum during his term as prime minister.

=== Environmental issues ===
While serving in the Gillard government, Albanese supported the introduction of carbon pricing, and voted, along with the rest of the Labor Party, to establish the Clean Energy Act 2011, which instituted a carbon pricing scheme in Australia. After the Abbott government abolished the scheme in July 2014, Albanese stated that carbon pricing was no longer needed, as "the circumstances have changed".

Albanese is a prominent backer of renewable energy in Australia and has declared that the country's "long-term future lies in renewable energy sources". Upon his election in 2022, he said he would "end the climate wars" and mitigation and policies to address climate change in Australia would be a priority for his government, in contrast with those preceding it. Albanese supported the introduction and sale of electric vehicles.

=== Foreign policy ===
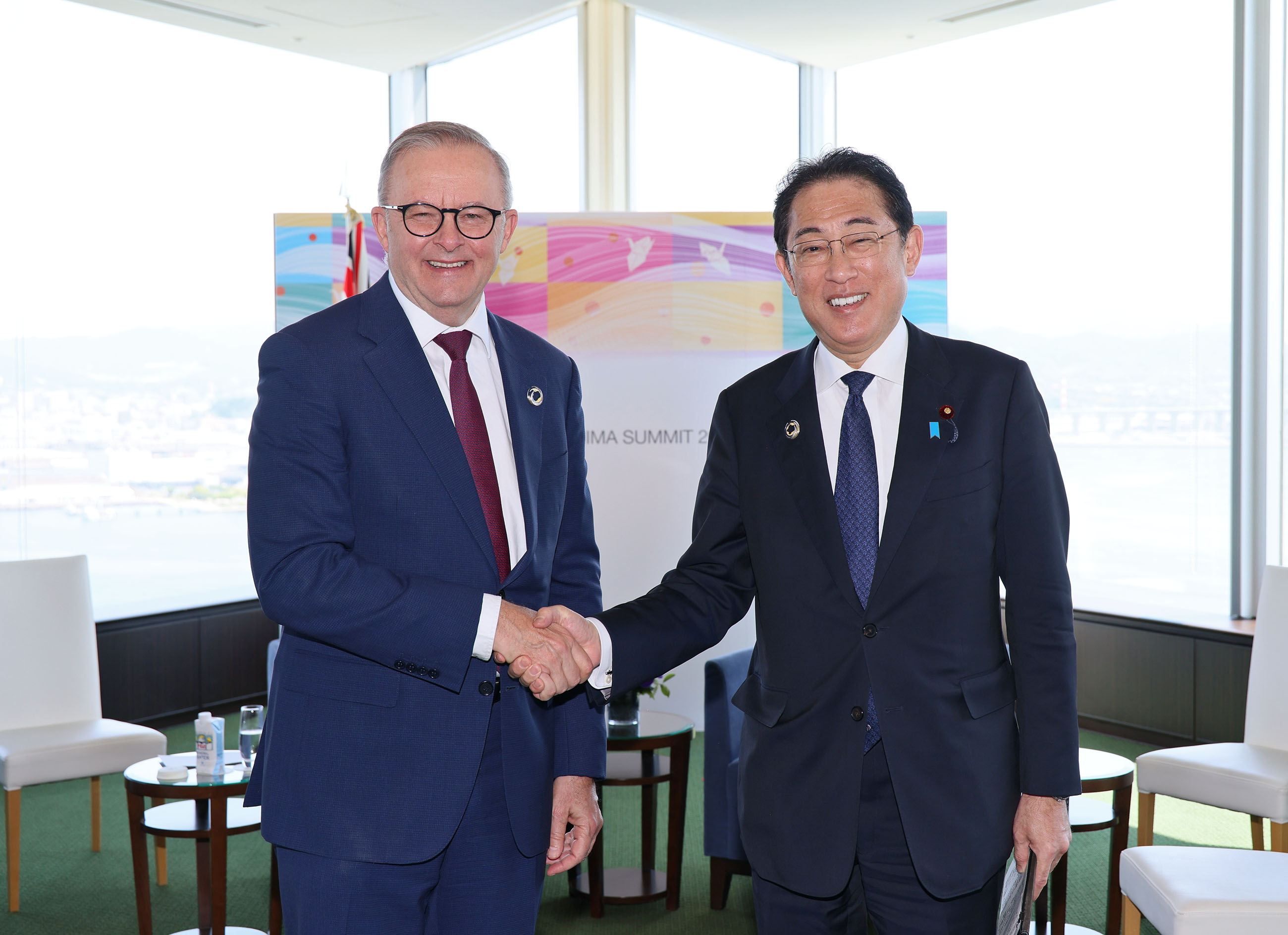
Albanese with Japanese Prime Minister Fumio Kishida in 2023

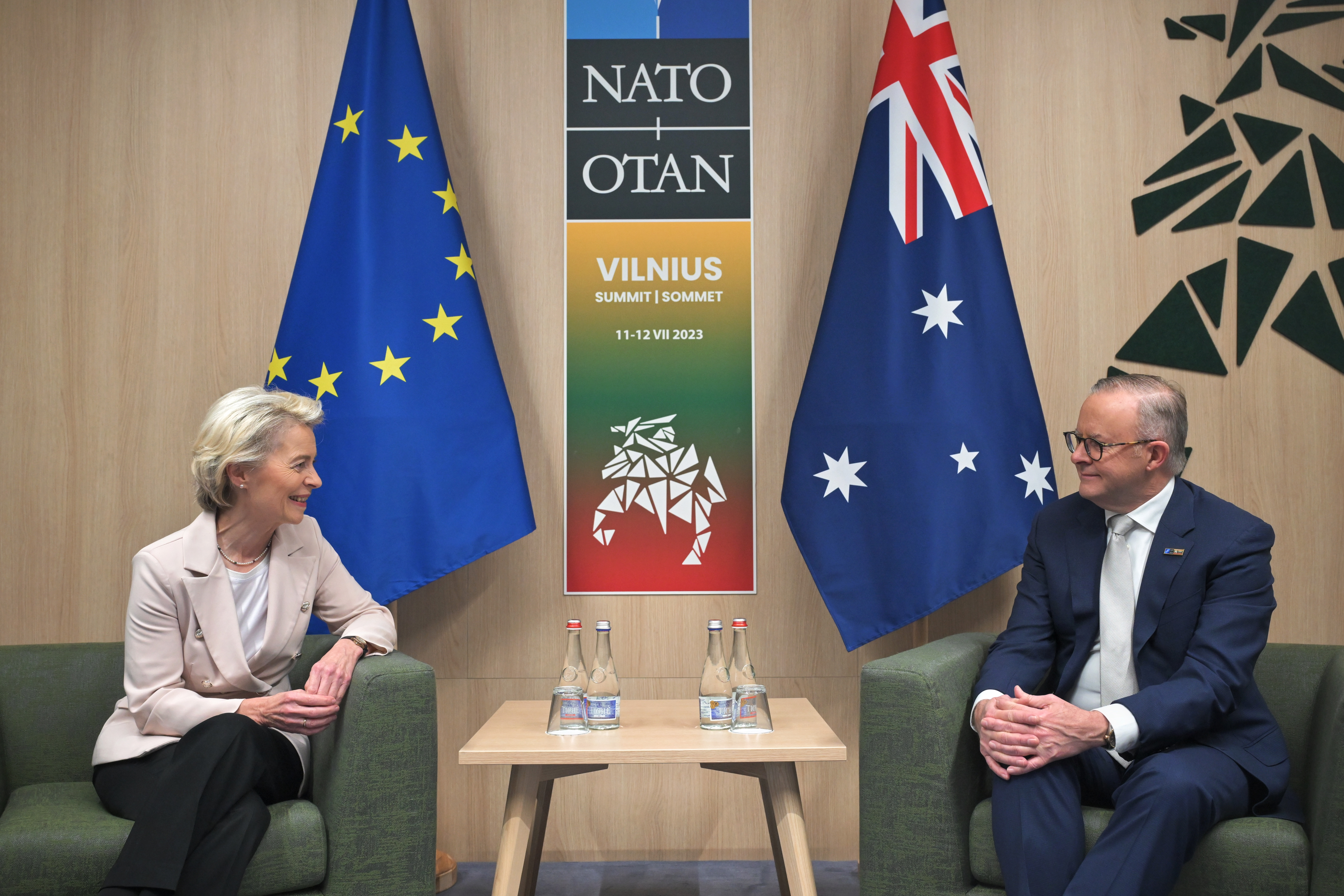
Albanese with European Commission President Ursula von der Leyen at the NATO Summit in Vilnius, Lithuania, in 2023

Albanese's foreign policy beliefs have been the subject of media attention. Writing for the Australian Financial Review, James Curran noted his shift from an "idealistic left-wing critic of globalisation" to "a true believer in the American alliance". Albanese was staunchly opposed to the US-led invasion of Iraq, saying in February 2003 that "Whatever criticisms can be made of the Iraqi regime, Islamic fundamentalism is not one of them. This is one of the reasons the United States supported Saddam Hussein in the 1980s, including supplying his regime with weapons of mass destruction, which he then used against both the Iranians and the Kurds." Albanese repeatedly urged for the release of Australian whistleblower and WikiLeaks founder Julian Assange, who was being held in custody in the United Kingdom until 2024.

In February 2022, Albanese condemned Russia's invasion of Ukraine, remarking in a press release that it was a "grave moment for humanity".

In May 2022, Albanese said Australia's relationship with China would remain "a difficult one". He said that "Australia values human rights. We have spoken out about the treatment of Uyghurs, about what's occurred in Hong Kong, about Taiwan, about other minorities including in Tibet, that are suffering from human rights abuses."

==== Israel–Palestine conflict ====
Albanese's views on the Israeli–Palestinian conflict have been the subject of media interest, with The Times of Israel categorising him as a supporter of Palestine. Alongside Joe Hockey, Albanese established the parliamentary "Friends of Palestine" group in 1998. Despite this, he has been a critic of the Boycott, Divestment and Sanctions movement, calling it "clumsy and counterproductive". During the 2014 Gaza War, he called Israel's bombardment of the Gaza Strip a "collective punishment" that was "completely unacceptable". In 2018, he challenged a decision by the Australian government to vote against a UN human rights council motion calling for an investigation into the killings of Palestinian protesters during the Great March of Return. Shortly before the 2022 election, Albanese told The Australian Jewish News that any decision he takes on Israel-Palestine will contribute "to a peaceful resolution of the conflict and to progress towards a two-state solution". When asked about a 2018 resolution to recognise the State of Palestine, Albanese insisted the motion "has no greater or lesser weight" than it did previously. In October 2022, his government reversed the Morrison government's decision to recognise West Jerusalem as Israel's capital. In December 2023, Albanese signed a joint statement, along with the prime ministers of Canada and New Zealand, calling for a ceasefire in the Gaza war. Albanese has been criticised by conservative and pro-Israel opponents for his perceived inaction in combatting antisemitism during his term. In December 2024, Israeli prime minister Benjamin Netanyahu linked the firebombing of a Melbourne synagogue to Albanese's "extreme anti-Israel position", which included supporting United Nations resolutions critical of Israel's conduct in the Palestinian territories, and also accused his government of "pouring fuel on the antisemitic fire" following the 2025 Bondi Beach shooting.

=== Social issues ===
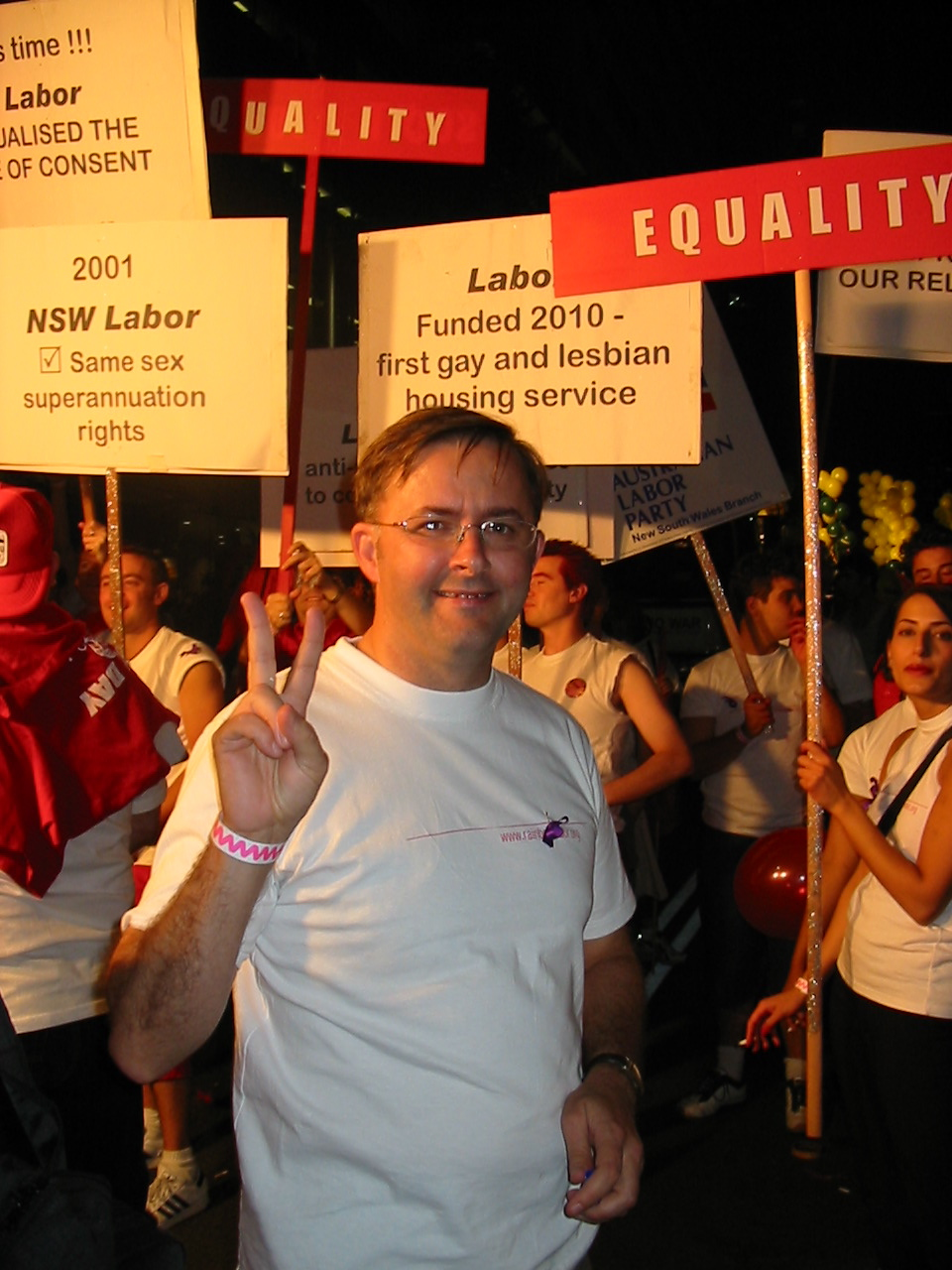
Albanese at the Sydney Gay and Lesbian Mardi Gras in 2003

Albanese supports abortion rights, stating in an interview in August 2019 that he believes "women do have a right to choose". He is also in favour of legalising voluntary euthanasia; in December 2022, his government repealed the Euthanasia Laws Act 1997, which prevented the territories of Australia from legalising euthanasia.

Albanese is a supporter and advocate for LGBT rights, and has regularly participated in the Sydney Gay and Lesbian Mardi Gras since 1983. When Labor Party members were granted a conscience vote on the Marriage Amendment Bill 2012, which would have legalised same-sex marriage in Australia, Albanese voted in favour of the bill, which was unsuccessful. He opposed holding a plebiscite for same-sex marriage, stating that "we shouldn't be having a public vote where we get to judge other families". In 2017, Albanese also voted in favour of the Marriage Amendment (Definition and Religious Freedoms) Act 2017, the bill which ultimately legalised same-sex marriage. Albanese has voiced support of transgender rights, saying that "people coming to terms with their identity and who they are, I think that they need to be respected", although has voted against bills and motions intended to improve transgender rights in the past.

Early in his political career, Albanese supported drug decriminalisation, telling Parliament in 1997 that "drug use by individuals is a health issue, not a criminal issue". However, in February 2022, he declined to commit to decriminalisation of hard drugs, commenting that the "current settings are appropriate".

In July 2015, Albanese stated his opposition to the government's policy of turning back asylum seekers who arrive to the country via boat, saying: "I couldn't ask someone else to do something that I couldn't see myself doing ... if people were in a boat including families and children, I myself couldn't turn that around." During the 2022 federal election campaign, Albanese clarified that boat turnbacks would be incorporated into his government's policy, leading to some critics accusing him of "flip-flopping" on the issue. In August 2021, after the Taliban seized control of Afghanistan, Albanese urged the Morrison government to give Afghan refugees permanent residency in Australia.

In May 2024, Albanese voiced his support for raising the age at which a child can open a social media account from 13 to 16, citing concerns over the mental health of young people, with his government passing legislation to compel social media companies to do so. He has referred to social media as a "scourge".

== Personal life ==
In 2000, Albanese married Carmel Tebbutt, a future Deputy Premier of New South Wales. They had met in Young Labor during the late 1980s, and have one son together. The two separated in January 2019. In June 2020, it was reported that Albanese was in a relationship with Jodie Haydon. Albanese said they had met at a dinner event in Melbourne a year after his separation from Tebbutt. Albanese is the first divorcee to be appointed prime minister. In February 2024, Albanese announced his engagement to Haydon after proposing to her at The Lodge in Canberra. On 29 November 2025, Albanese and Haydon were married in a private ceremony at The Lodge. Albanese is the first prime minister of Australia to be engaged or wed while in office.

Albanese describes himself as "half-Italian and half-Irish" and a "non-practising Catholic". He is also a music fan who, not long after becoming prime minister, attended a Gang of Youths concert at the Enmore Theatre and previously intervened as transport minister to save a Dolly Parton tour from bureaucratic red tape. In 2013, he co-hosted a pre-election special of music program Rage and his song selection included the Pixies, the Pogues, the Smiths, the Triffids, PJ Harvey, Nirvana, Hunters & Collectors and Joy Division. On 30 November 2023, Albanese posted his Spotify Wrapped to his Instagram story, indicating his top artists for the year to be Lana Del Rey, Taylor Swift, Hilltop Hoods, Bruce Springsteen, and Lily Allen. In January 2026, he posted his picks for Triple j's Hottest 100 of 2025, among of which included Olivia Dean, Hatchie, Hilltop Hoods (again), Kita Alexander, Lily Allen (again), Ocean Alley, Ruby Fields, Spacey Jane, G Flip and Wolf Alice.

As a lifelong supporter of the South Sydney Rabbitohs rugby league club, Albanese was a board member of the club from 1999 to 2002 and influential in the fight to have the club readmitted to the National Rugby League (NRL) competition. During October 2009, The Sydney Morning Herald reported that Albanese had opposed an attempt to appoint the former Liberal prime minister John Howard to a senior position in the NRL. Albanese stated he had phoned the NRL chief executive, David Gallop, as well as other league officials, to advise them against the idea. He then implored officials at Souths to help stop the suggestion from gaining momentum. In 2013, he was made a life member of the club. He is also a fan of Australian rules football, and supports the Hawthorn Football Club, with Albanese attending the 1991 AFL Grand Final which saw Hawthorn claim its 9th premiership.

Albanese was injured in a side collision while driving in Marrickville, New South Wales, on 8 January 2021. He underwent treatment at Royal Prince Alfred Hospital and was reportedly "injured externally and internally and had suffered considerable shock in the immediate aftermath of the impact". The other driver was a 17-year-old who was charged with negligent driving. Emergency workers told Albanese that if the teen's car had hit just 30 centimetres (12 in) either side of where it did, Albanese "would almost certainly have been killed". Shortly following this accident, Albanese lost over 18 kilograms (40 lb) by cutting out carbohydrates and reducing his alcohol intake, in an effort to be "match fit" for his election campaign. Four years after the crash, Albanese revealed that he still suffers ongoing spinal issues and has difficulty sitting in a car for long distances.

Prior to 2024, Albanese owned multiple investment and residential properties in the Inner West of Sydney and Canberra. In 2024, Albanese and Haydon purchased a beachside cliff-top mansion in the Central Coast town of Copacabana for $4.3M. In October 2024, REA Group estimated his property portfolio at $8.8 million.

== Awards and honours ==
=== Foreign honours ===
Ribbon bar	Country	Honour	Date
	Timor-Leste	Grand Collar of the Order of Timor-Leste	28 January 2026
	Fiji	Honorary Companion of the Order of Fiji	6 July 2026

- Atlantic Council: 2026 Global Citizen Award

== See also ==
- First Rudd ministry (2007–2010)
- First Gillard ministry (June–September 2010)
- Second Gillard ministry (2010–2013)
- Second Rudd ministry (June–September 2013)
- Albanese shadow ministry (2019–2022)
- First Albanese ministry (2022–2025)
- Second Albanese ministry (2025–present)
- List of current heads of state and government
- List of heads of the executive by approval rating

== Sources ==
- Middleton, Karen (2016). Albanese: Telling It Straight. Random House Australia. ISBN 9781925324730.
- Savva, Niki (2022). Bulldozed: Scott Morrison's fall and Anthony Albanese's rise. Melbourne: Scribe. ISBN 9781922586841.

Parliament of Australia
Preceded by Jeannette McHugh	Member for Grayndler; 1996–present	Incumbent
Political offices
Preceded by Judith Troeth as Shadow Parliamentary Secretary to the Shadow Minister for Employment, Training and Family Services	Shadow Parliamentary Secretary to the Shadow Minister for Family and Community Services; 1998–2001	Succeeded by Annette Ellis
Preceded by Chris Evans as Shadow Minister for Family Services and the Aged	Shadow Minister for Ageing and Seniors; 2001–2002	Succeeded by Annette Ellis
Preceded by David Cox	Shadow Minister for Employment Services and Training; 2002–2004	Succeeded by Penny Wong as Shadow Minister for Employment and Workforce Participation
Preceded by Simon Crean	Deputy Manager of Opposition Business in the House; 2004–2006	Succeeded by Kelvin Thomson
Preceded by Kelvin Thomson as Shadow Minister for Sustainability, the Environment and Heritage	Shadow Minister for Environment and Heritage; 2004–2006	Succeeded by Peter Garrett as Shadow Minister for Climate Change, Environment and Heritage
New office	Shadow Minister for Water; 2005–2006	Succeeded by Himself as Shadow Minister for Water and Infrastructure
Preceded by Himself as Shadow Minister for Water	Shadow Minister for Water and Infrastructure; 2006–2007	Succeeded by Greg Hunt as Shadow Minister for Climate Change, Environment and Urban Water
Preceded by Himself as Shadow Minister for Water	Shadow Minister for Water and Infrastructure; 2006–2007	Succeeded by Warren Truss as Shadow Minister for Infrastructure, Transport and Local Government
Preceded by Julia Gillard	Manager of Opposition Business in the House; 2006–2007	Succeeded by Joe Hockey
Preceded by Mark Vaile as Minister for Transport and Regional Services	Minister for Infrastructure, Transport, Regional Development and Local Government; 2007–2010	Succeeded by Himself as Minister for Infrastructure and Transport
Preceded by Jim Lloyd as Minister for Local Government, Territories and Roads	Minister for Infrastructure, Transport, Regional Development and Local Government; 2007–2010	Succeeded by Simon Crean as Minister for Regional Australia, Regional Development and Local Government
Preceded by Tony Abbott	Leader of the House; 2008–2013	Succeeded by Christopher Pyne
Preceded by Himself as Minister for Infrastructure, Transport, Regional Development and Local Government	Minister for Infrastructure and Transport; 2010–2013	Succeeded by Warren Truss as Minister for Infrastructure and Regional Development
Preceded by Simon Crean as Minister for Regional Australia, Regional Development and Local Government	Minister for Regional Development and Local Government; 2013	Succeeded by Sharon Bird as Minister for Regional Development
Preceded by Simon Crean as Minister for Regional Australia, Regional Development and Local Government	Minister for Regional Development and Local Government; 2013	Succeeded by Catherine King as Minister for Regional Australia, Local Government and Territories
Preceded by Wayne Swan	Deputy Prime Minister of Australia; 2013	Succeeded by Warren Truss
Preceded by Stephen Conroy	Minister for Broadband, Communications and the Digital Economy; 2013	Succeeded by Malcolm Turnbull as Minister for Communications
Preceded by Warren Truss	Shadow Minister for Infrastructure and Transport; 2013–2016	Succeeded by Himself as Shadow Minister for Infrastructure, Transport, Cities and Regional Development
Preceded by Bob Baldwin	Shadow Minister for Tourism; 2013–2019	Succeeded by Don Farrell
Preceded by Scott Morrison as Shadow Minister for Productivity and Population	Shadow Minister for Cities; 2014–2016	Succeeded by Himself as Shadow Minister for Infrastructure, Transport, Cities and Regional Development
Preceded by Himself as Shadow Minister for Infrastructure and Transport and Shadow Minister for Cities	Shadow Minister for Infrastructure, Transport, Cities and Regional Development; 2016–2019	Succeeded by Bridget McKenzie as Shadow Minister for Infrastructure, Transport and Regional Development
Preceded by Julie Collins as Shadow Minister for Regional Development and Local Government	Shadow Minister for Infrastructure, Transport, Cities and Regional Development; 2016–2019	Succeeded by James McGrath as Shadow Minister for Urban Infrastructure and Cities
Preceded by Bill Shorten	Leader of the Opposition of Australia; 2019–2022	Succeeded by Peter Dutton
Preceded by Scott Morrison	Prime Minister of Australia; 2022–present	Incumbent
Party political offices
Preceded by Wayne Swan	Deputy Leader of the Australia Labor Party; 2013	Succeeded by Tanya Plibersek
Preceded by Bill Shorten	Leader of the Australian Labor Party; 2019–present	Incumbent
