= National Environmental Protection Agency (Australia) =

Australian government agency

Agency overview
- Formed: 1 July 2026
- Jurisdiction: Australian Government
- Headquarters: Canberra, Australian Capital Territory
- Annual budget: $121 million (2023–27; establishment)
- Minister responsible: Senator Murray Watt, Minister for the Environment and Water
- Agency executive: John Bradley PSM, CEO

The National Environmental Protection Agency (NEPA) is an Australian government agency dedicated to environmental and biodiversity protection. It is an independent body created by the National Environmental Protection Agency Act 2025 and commenced operations on 1 July 2026.

NEPA is the first environmental protection agency at a federal level, although several similar agencies exist at state level. It upholds and enforces Australia's main environmental law, the Environment Protection and Biodiversity Conservation Act 1999, with powers to investigate breaches of the Act and penalise non-compliance.

== History ==
=== Background ===
On a federal level, the first significant environmental protection law was the Environment Protection (Impact of Proposals) Act 1974, passed by the Whitlam government, which created a framework wherein the environmental impacts of projects must be considered. By the 1990s, almost every state had established a state-based environmental protection agency, beginning with Victoria's Environment Protection Authority (EPA) in 1971. On 1 May 1992, the Intergovernmental Agreement on the Environment (IGAE) between the Commonwealth and state and territory governments was established to coordinate a national environmental protection response across all levels of government. The Keating government passed the National Environmental Protection Council Act 1994 to create uniform country-wide standards for environmental protection.

On 16 July 1999, the Howard government passed the Environment Protection and Biodiversity Conservation Act 1999 (commonly abbreviated to the EPBC Act), overhauling the 1974 Act and becoming the framework for Australia's environmental laws. However, the Act would be criticised as ineffective as it did not allow decision-making processes to be wholly independent of government ministers. On 30 October 2020, Graeme Samuel submitted a comprehensive review of the EPBC Act to Environment Minister Sussan Ley, recommending major changes to the legislation and the establishment of an independent agency to deal with environmental protection issues. Upon the election of the Albanese government in 2022, new Environment Minister Tanya Plibersek committed to establishing a federal environmental protection agency. Despite the pledge, the legislation to establish the NEPA was stalled by prime minister Anthony Albanese following lobbying by the mining sector and the Western Australian state government, leading to outcry from environmental groups.

=== Establishment ===
The Albanese government was re-elected at the 2025 election, with Murray Watt becoming the new Environment Minister. He pledged to legislate the NEPA, and on 27 November 2025, the necessary legislation belatedly passed Parliament with the support of the Greens. The agency will commence operations on 1 July 2026. On 2 June 2026, public servant John Bradley was announced as the NEPA's inaugural CEO.

== See also ==
- Conservation in Australia
