= Operation Relex =

Australian military immigration enforcement (2001–06)

Operation Relex is the name given to the Australian Defence Force (ADF) border protection operation in the country's northern approaches conducted between 2001 and 2006. The operation was instigated following the Tampa affair in September 2001 and the Australian government's resultant Pacific Solution. The focus of Operation Relex was illegal immigration, with assets from all three services of the ADF deployed to prevent the arrival of Suspected Illegal Entry Vessels (SIEVs) in the Australian migration zone.

The primary period of activity of Operation Relex was between October and December 2001 when ten SIEVs were intercepted by HMA Ships Warramunga, Arunta, and Leeuwin, assisted by several Fremantle-class patrol boats.

Operation Relex was folded into the broader border protection activity named Operation Resolute which commenced in July 2006. In 2013, the Abbott government implemented Operation Sovereign Borders.

== Operational Service Medal – Border Protection ==
The Australian Government issued a medal for service on Border Protection on 22 May 2012.

To qualify, ADF members must have been deployed or force assigned for duty as a member of a declared operation:

- for a period of not less than an aggregate of 30 days; or
- completed 30 sorties from a unit assigned to a declared operation, provided that those sorties were conducted over a period of not less than an aggregate of 30 days at a rate of one sortie per day.

== Op Relex ==
3 September to 13 March 2002

Rotation	Date from	Date to	Ship(s)	Unit/Sub Unit
TSE 1	OCT MID	DEC MID	TEMPA/HMAS MANOORA	5/7 RAR
TSE 1	MID NOVEMBER	EARLY DEC	HMAS ARUNTA	5/7 RAR
TSE 3	1 Sep	1 Dec	HMAS Leeuwin	1st Armoured Regiment (Tank) and 5/7RAR
TSE 4	1 Sep	1 Nov	HMAS Tobruk	1st Armoured Regiment (Tank)
TSE 5	1 Nov	20 Jan 2	HMA Ships Arunta and Warramunga	101 MDM BTY, 8/12 Medium Regiment
TSE 6	1 Jan 2	18 Feb 2	HMAS Melville	103 MDM BTY, 8/12 MDM REGT
TSE 7				
TSE 8				
TSE 9				
TSE 10				
TSE 11			HMAS ANZAC	1st Armoured Regiment
TSE 12	27 March 2002	2 May 2002	HMAS Leeuwin & HMAS Melville	1 CSSB + 5/7 RAR Detachment

== Op Relex II ==
14 March 2002 to 16 July 2006

Rotation	Date from	Date to	Ship(s)	Unit/Sub Unit
TSE 13			HMAS Darwin	HQ BTY, 8/12 Medium Regiment
TSE 14	15 Apr 2	1 Jul 02	HMAS Adelaide	101 MDM BTY, 8/12 Medium Regiment
TSE 15				
TSE 16			HMAS Melville & HMAS Leeuwin	1st Combat Engineer Regiment
TSE 17				
TSE 18				
TSE 19				
TSE 20				
TSE 21				
TSE 22				
TSE 23	26 Oct 02	2 Feb 03	HMAS Leeuwin, Warramunga & Tobruk	1st Armoured/ 2 Cav Regiment
TSE 24	16 Sep 2	1 Jan 3	HMAS Melville	1 BDE
TSE 25	2 Jul	2 Sep	HMAS Tobruk, Adelaide & Warramunga	2CER, 1 Fd Regt, 2/14 LHR
TSE 26	2 Dec	3 Mar	HMAS Warramunga	1 JSU, 16 ADR, 4th MP Company
TSE 27				
TSE 28				
TSE 29				
TSE 30				
TSE 31				4 Field Regiment
TSE 32	Feb 2004	May 2004	HMAS Anzac, HMAS Warramunga, HMAS Adelaide	1st Field Regiment (now 1st Regiment)
TSE 35	Oct 2004	4 Feb	HMAS Ballarat, Parramatta	2 DIV units/ 8 BDE

== HMA Ships Involved in Op Relex ==
Major Fleet Units

	Relex	
Unit	Entered Operation	Exited Operation
HMAS Adelaide	19 Sep 1	12 Oct 1
HMAS Anzac	19 Jan 2	7 Apr 2
HMAS Arunta	2 Sep 1	20 Sep 1
	10 Oct 1	19 Dec 1
HMAS Newcastle	30 Aug 1	28 Sep 1
HMAS Warramunga	30 Aug 1	23 Sep 1
	27 Sep 1	14 Nov 1
	19 Dec 1	20 Jan 2
HMAS Manoora	2 Sep 1	6 Oct 1
HMAS Tobruk	10 Sep 1	14 Dec 1
HMAS Westralia	30 Aug 1	24 Sep 1
	27 Sep 1	29 Sep 1
	11 Oct 1	17 Oct 1
	30 Oct 1	3 Nov 1
	15 Nov 1	26 Nov 1
	18 Jan 2	20 Jan 2
HMAS Leeuwin	14 Nov 1	2 Jan 2
	16 Feb 2	14 Apr 2
HMAS Melville	30 Dec 1	18 Feb 2

Patrol Boats

	Relex		Cranberry	
Unit	Entered Operation	Exited Operation	Entered Operation	Exited Operation
HMAS Bendigo	30 Sep 1	2 Oct 1	21 Sep 1	3- 1 Sep
	16 Oct	18 Oct 1	2 Oct 1	16 Oct 1
	23 Oct 1	1 Nov 1	18 Oct 01	23 Oct 1
	1 Feb 02	1 Nov 01	18 Oct 01	19 Nov 1
	9 Feb 02	12 Feb 2	11 Jan 02	21 Jan 2
	15 Feb 2	21 Feb 2	25 Jan 02	1 Feb 2
	25 Feb 02	27 Feb 02	3 Feb 02	6 Feb 2
	2 Mar 02	4 Mar 02	9 Feb 02	9 Feb 2
			12 Feb 2	15 Feb 2
			27 Feb 02	15 Feb 2
			4 Mar 02	8 Mar 2
			1 Apr 02	9 Apr 2
HMAS Bunbury	30 Sep 1	1 Oct 01	25 Sep 01	30 Sep 1
	20 Oct 01	26 Oct 01	1 Oct 01	20 Oct 1
	30 Oct 01	3 Nov 01	26 Oct 01	30 Oct 1
	9 Nov 01	15 Nov 01	3 Nov 01	9 Nov 1
	11 Feb 02	17 Feb 02	15 Nov 01	19 Nov 1
	20 Feb 02	25 Feb 02	2 Feb 02	11 Feb 2
	27 Feb 02	28 Feb 02	17 Feb 02	27 Feb 2
			28 Feb 02	6 Mar 2
			8 Mar 02	11 Mar 2
			15 Mar 02	18 Mar 2
HMAS Cessnock	5 Nov 1	7 Nov 01	10 Aug 01	23 Aug 1
	12 Nov 01	16 Nov 01	14 Sep 01	24 Sep 1
	1 Dec 01	4 Dec 01	2 Nov 01	5 Nov 1
	8 Dec 01	13 Dec 01	7 Nov 01	12 Nov 1
	18 Dec 01	21 Dec 01	16 Nov 01	1 Dec 1
	4 Mar 02	6 Mar	4 Dec 1	8 Dec 1
	7 Mar 02	8 Mar 02	13 Dec 01	16 Dec 1
	1 Mar 02	6 Mar 02	21 Dec 01	7 Jan 2
	9 Mar 02	12 Mar 02	18 Feb 02	25 Feb 2
	14 Mar 02	14 Mar 02	6 Mar 02	8 Mar 2
			9 Mar 02	23 Mar 2
			27 Mar 02	29 Mar 2
			6 Apr 02	8 Apr 2
HMAS Dubbo	15 Sep 01	17 Sep 01	7 Sep 01	15 Sep 1
	13 Oct 01	16 Oct 01	17 Sep 01	13 Oct 1
	2 Nov 01	8 Nov 01	16 Oct 01	2 Nov 1
	8 Nov 01	10 Nov 01	8 Nov 01	8 Nov 1
			10 Nov 01	12 Nov 1
			23 Mar 02	25 Mar 2
			28 Mar 02	1 Apr 2
			6 Apr 02	10 Apr 2
			11 Apr 02	10 Apr 2
			16 Apr 02	17 Apr 2
HMAS Ipswich	22 Dec 01	28 Dec 01	17 Aug 01	20 Aug 1
	2 Jan 02	5 Jan 02	11 Oct 01	15 Oct 1
	11 Jan 02	15 Jan 02	7 Dec 01	22 Dec 1
	23 Jan 02	26 Jan 02	28 Dec 01	2 Jan 2
			5 Jan 02	12 Jan 2
			15 Jan 02	23 Jan 2
			15 Jan 02	23 Jan 2
			26 Jan 02	4 Feb 2
HMAS Launceston	6 Nov 01	11 Nov 01	16 Aug 01	17 Sep 1
	12 Dec 01	16 Dec 01	3 Nov 01	6 Nov 1
	17 Dec 01	18 Dec 1	11 Nov 1	17 Nov 1
	19 Feb 01	23 Feb 2	19 Nov 1	23 Nov 1
	27 Feb 02	2 Mar 02	15 Feb 02	19 Feb 2
	7 Mar 02	10 Mar 02	23 Feb 02	27 Feb 2
			2 Mar 02	7 Mar 2
			10 Mar 02	16 Mar 2
			24 Mar 2	25 Mar 2
HMAS Townsville	12 Oct 01	18 Oct 01	29 Jul 01	3 Aug 1
	23 Oct 01	28 Oct 01	21 Sep 01	12 Oct 1
	21 Jan 02	26 Jan 02	18 Oct 02	23 Oct 2
	30 Jan 02	4 Feb 02	26 Jan 02	30 Jan 2
			4 Jan 02	21 Jan 2
			26 Jan 02	30 Jan 2
			4 Feb 02	9 Feb 2
			12 Feb 02	23 Feb 2
HMAS Townsville	24 Nov 1	28 Nov 1	8 Nov 1	24 Nov 1
	4 Dec 1	6 Dec 1	28 Nov 1	4 Dec 1
	15 Feb 2	21 Feb 2	6 Dec 1	10 Dec 1
	25 Feb 2	28 Feb 2	14 Feb 2	15 Feb 2
	11 Mar 2	(16 Mar 2)	21 Feb 2	25 Feb 2
			28 Feb 2	4 Mar 2
			8 Mar 2	1 Mar 2
			16 Mar 2	18 Mar 2
			30 Mar 2	5 Apr 1
			11 Apr 2	15 Apr 2
HMAS Whyalla	9 Oct 1	14 Oct 1	14 Sep 1	18 Sep 1
	18 Oct 1	24 Oct 1	21 Sep 1	7 Oct 1
	26 Dec 1	30 Dec 1	14 Oct 1	18 Oct 1
	4 Jan 2	9 Jan 2	24 Oct 1	12 Nov 1
	13 Jan 2	18 Jan 2	30 Dec 1	4 Jan 2
			5 Jan 2	13 Jan 2
			18 Jan 2	4 Feb 2
			29 Mar 2	10 Apr 2
			11 Apr 2	16 Apr 2
			16 Apr 2	16 Apr 2
			17 Apr 2	NDA
HMAS Wollongong	27 Oct 01	3 Nov 01	27 Oct 01	27 Oct 1
	6 Nov 01	13 Nov 01	3 Oct 01	6 Nov 1
	28 Nov 01	1 Dec 01	13 Dec 1	28 Nov 1
	28 Jan 02	30 Jan 02	1 Dec 1	9 Dec 1
	3 Feb 02	7 Feb 2	14 Dec 1	17 Dec 1
	13 Feb 02	16 Feb 02	30 Dec 01	9 Feb 2
			30 Jan 02	3 Feb 2
			7 Feb 2	13 Feb 2
			16 Feb 2	18 Feb 2
			13 Apr 2	15 Apr 2
