= Boat arrivals in Australia 1976–2013 =

Statistics on number of arrivals

This list shows the number of asylum seekers arriving by boat on Australian shores or within its territorial waters between 1976 and 2013, after which the figures were no longer released to the public. The statistics were retrieved from the Australian Department of Parliamentary Services research paper, Boat arrivals in Australia since 1976, p.22.

Year	No. of boats	No. of people (excludes crew)	Notes
1976		111	
1977		868	
1978		746	
1979		304	
1980		0	
1981		30	
1982–1988		0	
1989	1	26	
1990	2	198	
1991	6	214	
1992	6	216	
1993	3	81	
1994	18	953	
1995	7	237	
1996	19	660	
1997	11	339	
1998	17	200	
1999	86	3721	
2000	51	2939	
2001	43	5516	
2002	1	1	
2003	1	53	
2004	1	15	
2005	4	11	
2006	6	60	
2007	5	148	
2008	7	161	
2009	60	2726	
2010	134	6555	
2011	69	4565	
2012	278	17202	
2013 (to 30 June 2013).	196	13108	

For arrivals since July 2013, see limited figures released since Operation Sovereign Borders.

== See also ==
- Asylum in Australia
- Immigration detention in Australia
- Pacific Solution
- Operation Sovereign Borders
- Stop the boats
