= HMAS Pirie (ACPB 87) =

Armidale-class patrol boat

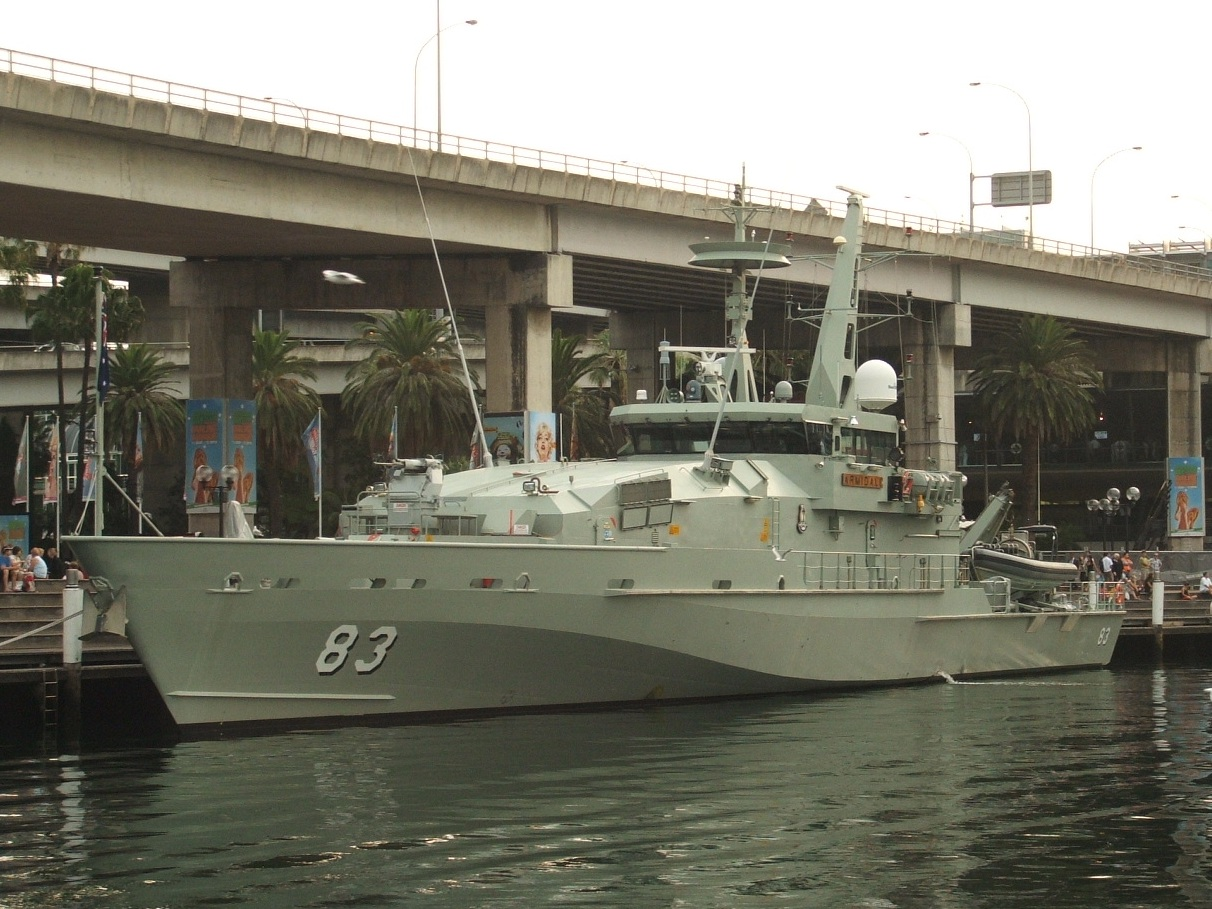
- HMAS Armidale, a sister ship to HMAS Pirie

History

Australia
- Namesake: City of Port Pirie, South Australia
- Builder: Austal Ships, Henderson, Western Australia
- Commissioned: 29 July 2006
- Decommissioned: 26 March 2021
- Home port: Darwin
- Identification: MMSI number: 503205000
- Motto: "Mark of Quality"
- Honours and awards: Three inherited battle honours
- Status: Awaiting disposal
- Badge

General characteristics
- Class & type: Armidale-class patrol boat
- Displacement: 300 tons standard load
- Length: 56.8 m (186 ft)
- Beam: 9.7 m (32 ft)
- Draught: 2.7 m (8.9 ft)
- Propulsion: 2 × MTU 4000 16V 6,225 horsepower (4,642 kW) diesels driving twin propellers
- Speed: 25 knots (46 km/h; 29 mph)
- Range: 3,000 nautical miles (5,600 km; 3,500 mi) at 12 knots (22 km/h; 14 mph)
- Endurance: 21 days standard, 42 days maximum
- Boats & landing craft carried: 2 × Zodiac 7.2 m (24 ft) RHIBs
- Complement: 21 standard, 29 maximum
- Sensors & processing systems: Bridgemaster E surface search/navigation radar
- Electronic warfare & decoys: Prism III radar warning system; Toplite electro-optical detection system; Warrlock direction finding system
- Armament: 1 × Rafael Typhoon stabilised gun mount fitted with a 25 mm (1 in) M242 Bushmaster autocannon; 2 × 12.7 mm (0.5 in) machine guns

HMAS Pirie (ACPB 87), named for the city of Port Pirie, South Australia, is an Armidale-class patrol boat of the Royal Australian Navy (RAN).

== Design and construction ==
The Armidale-class patrol boats are 56.8 metres (186 ft) long, with a beam of 9.7 metres (32 ft), a draught of 2.7 metres (8 ft 10 in), and a standard displacement of 270 tons. The semi-displacement vee hull is fabricated from aluminium alloy, and each vessel is built to a combination of Det Norske Veritas standards for high-speed light craft and RAN requirements. The Armidales can travel at a maximum speed of 25 knots (46 km/h; 29 mph), and are driven by two propeller shafts, each connected to an MTU 16V M70 diesel. The ships have a range of 3,000 nautical miles (5,600 km; 3,500 mi) at 12 knots (22 km/h; 14 mph), allowing them to patrol the waters around the distant territories of Australia, and are designed for standard patrols of 21 days, with a maximum endurance of 42 days.

The main armament of the Armidale class is a Rafael Typhoon stabilised 25-millimetre (0.98 in) gun mount fitted with an M242 Bushmaster cannon. Two 12.7-millimetre (0.50 in) machine guns are also carried. Boarding operations are performed by two 7.2-metre (24 ft), waterjet propelled rigid-hulled inflatable boats (RHIBs). Each RHIB is stored in a dedicated cradle and davit, and is capable of operating independently from the patrol boat as it carries its own communications, navigation, and safety equipment.

Each patrol boat has a standard ship's company of 21 personnel, with a maximum of 29. The Armidales do not have a permanently assigned ship's company; instead, they are assigned to divisions at a ratio of two vessels to three companies, which rotate through the vessels and allow the Armidales to spend more time at sea, without compromising sailors' rest time or training requirements. A 20-berth auxiliary accommodation compartment was included in the design for the transportation of soldiers, illegal fishermen, or unauthorised arrivals; in the latter two cases, the compartment could be secured from the outside. However, a malfunction in the sewerage treatment facilities aboard HMAS Maitland in August 2006 pumped hydrogen sulphide and carbon monoxide into the compartment, non-fatally poisoning four sailors working inside, after which use of the compartment for accommodation was banned across the class.

Pirie was constructed by Austal at their shipyard in Henderson, Western Australia. She was commissioned into the RAN in her namesake city on 15 July 2006.

== Operational history ==
Pirie is assigned to Assail Division, is based in Darwin and performs border protection and fisheries protection patrols.

In 2006, the patrol boat was involved in unmanned aerial vehicle trials at Port Hedland, South Australia. In November, Pirie was formally assigned to border protection operations under Operation Resolute.

During 2008, Pirie participated in Exercise Singaroo with Australian and Singaporean vessels.

She attended the 2009 Chinese International Fleet Review.

During 2010, the vessel attended the Timor Fleet Review, then participated in that year's Exercise Cassowary, along with Australian and Indonesian units. Pirie was one of the ships that responded when a Suspected Illegal Entry Vessel carrying asylum seekers ran aground and sank off Christmas Island on 15 December 2010.

The vessel was decommissioned in Darwin on 26 March 2021.
