= Asylum in Australia =

Asylum in Australia has been granted to many refugees since 1945, when half a million Europeans displaced by World War II were given asylum. Since then, there have been periodic waves of asylum seekers from South East Asia and the Middle East, with government policy and public opinion changing over the years.

Refugees are governed by statutes and government policies which seek to implement Australia's obligations under the Convention relating to the Status of Refugees, to which Australia is a party. Thousands of refugees have sought asylum in Australia over the past decade, with the main forces driving movement being war, civil unrest and persecution. The annual refugee quota in 2012 was 20,000 people. From 1945 to the early 1990s, more than half a million refugees and other displaced persons were accepted into Australia.

Historically, most asylum seekers arrived by plane. However, there was an increasing number of asylum seekers arriving by boat in the late 2000s and early 2010s, which was met with some public disapproval. In 2011–2012, asylum seekers arriving by boat outnumbered those arriving by plane for the first time. Three waves of asylum seekers arriving by boat have been identified: Vietnamese between 1976 and 1981; Indochinese asylum seekers from 1989 to 1998; and people of Middle East origin from 1999.

The visa policy of the current government is to detain persons entering or being in Australia without a valid visa until those persons can be returned to their home country. Australia is the only country in the world with a policy of mandatory detention and offshore processing of asylum seekers who arrive without a valid visa.

Asylum policy is a contentious wedge issue in Australian politics, with the two major political parties in Australia arguing that the issue is a border control problem and one concerning the safety of those attempting to come to Australia by boat.

== Laws governing the status of asylum people ==
Historically, Australia was generally viewed as a world leader in resettling refugees, with more than 870,000 refugees resettled in Australia since World War II. Yet Australia is also one of the world's poorest in providing durable solutions to people who come here to claim protection – people seeking asylum – especially if they come by boat. This dichotomy has persisted into the present.

The processing of people seeking asylum that have arrived in Australia for status determination has undergone significant change over the past decade. The process for refugee status determination is dynamic, with the government's humanitarian program mainly diverging in process between on-shore and off-shore arrivals. While the Migration Act 1958 (Cth) had previously drafted to give effect to Australia's obligations under international law, mainly the 1951 Convention Relating to the Status of Refugees and its First Optional Protocol, recent legislative amendments by successive governments have uncoupled the Act from giving effect to the Convention. This has resulted in a softening on the impact of the Convention in interpreting the Act, leading to the government resiling from the protocol set out in the international agreement.

The Migration Amendment (Designated Unauthorised Arrivals) Bill 2006 introduced by the Howard government was withdrawn after an enquiry by a Senate Committee which reported on the Bill recommended that it should not proceed in light of the evidence presented to it, and it also became clear that it would be defeated in the Senate, with a number of Liberal Senators threatening to vote against it or abstain. Six years later, another bill, designated the Migration Amendment (Unauthorised Maritime Arrivals and Other Measures) Bill 2012, also gave rise to a Senate Committee Inquiry, with one submission showing that it was almost identical to the 2006 Bill, except without a reporting requirement obliging the Minister to table in Parliament an annual report which detailed the arrangements for assessing refugee claims processed offshore as well as information about their accommodation, health care and education. This added to concerns expressed below about the lack of transparency and public scrutiny. However the bill was passed into law, becoming the Migration Amendment (Unauthorised Maritime Arrivals and Other Measures) Act 2013.

A new "fast track" assessment scheme was introduced in 2014 via the Migration and Maritime Powers Legislation Amendment (Resolving the Asylum Legacy Caseload) Bill 2014 Migration and Maritime Powers Legislation Amendment (Resolving the Asylum Legacy Caseload) Bill 2014. The definition of a fast track applicant was narrowed further by Immigration Minister Peter Dutton in an amendment to the definition under the "Migration Act 1958", which changed the date of arrival requirement from January 2012 to August 2012 for parents whose children wished to be put classified as fast track applicants.

=== Offshore processing ===
Australia's humanitarian program is complex, but the basic structure is one of bifurcation between onshore and offshore processing of claims for people seeking asylum. While the onshore humanitarian program is common across most signatories to the 1951 Refugee Convention, it is Australia's offshore detention policy that is the most controversial and widely criticised by civil society members.

Australia is one of two nation-states that currently employ a policy of shifting potential people seeking asylum by boat to other nation-states for processing of asylum claims. This policy receives support from both major political parties.

=== Legacy caseload ===
In July 2019 it was estimated that there were about 30,000 people living in Australia who are ineligible for permanent residency, because they came to the country by boat before 2014. Recommendations to the government by the Australian Human Rights Commission to help improve the lives of these non-residents, some of whom live in poverty and suffer from mental health issues because of restrictions of their access to financial support and other welfare, and their uncertain futures, was rejected.

== Claims processing ==
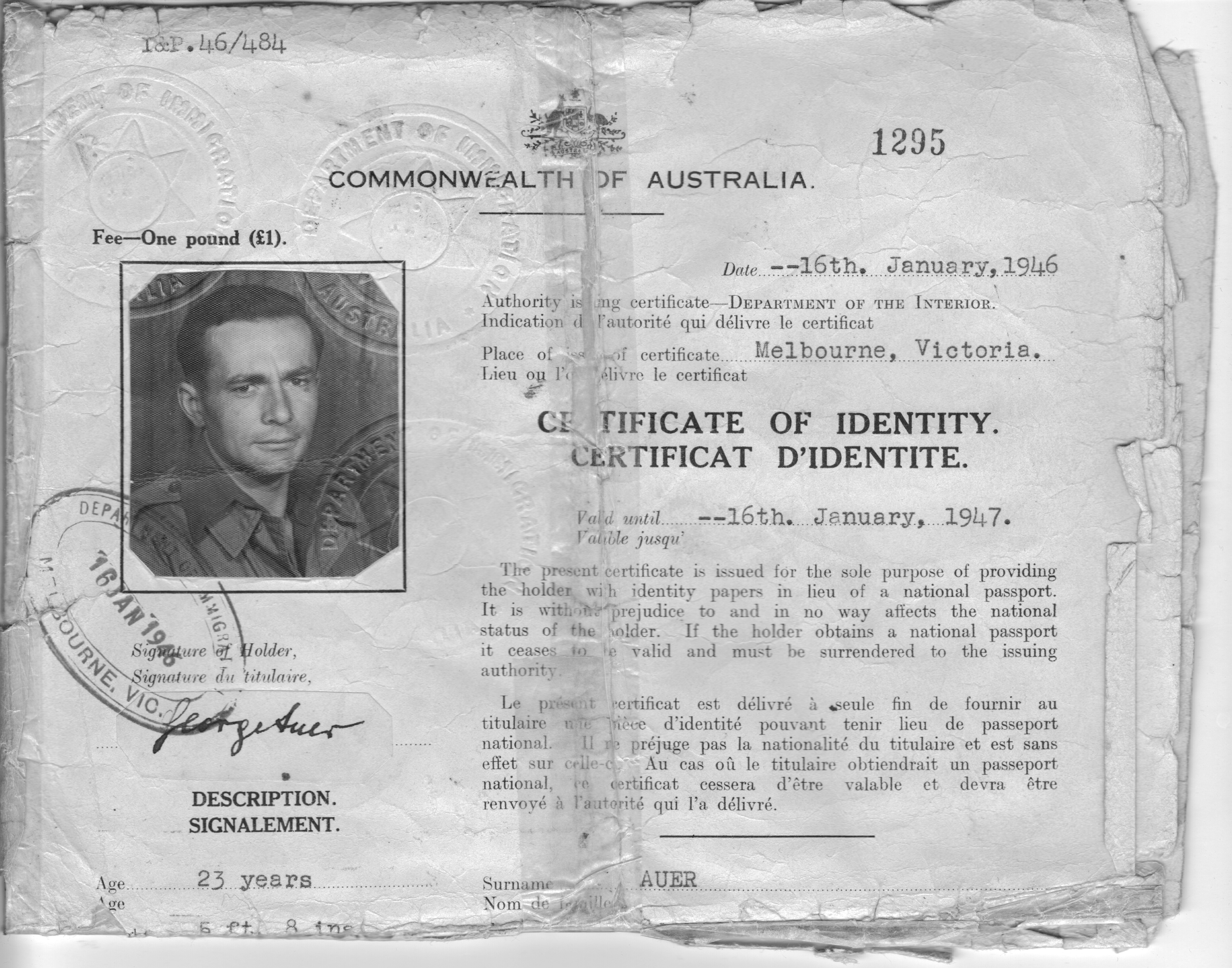
The HMT Dunera transported 2,432 men, including Georg Auer, to Australia from England in 1942.

A compliance interview, often done with the assistance of an interpreter, is one of the first steps taken by immigration officers to determine if a person is making a valid claim of asylum. If a valid fear of persecution is expressed a formal application for refugee status is undertaken. If permission to stay in Australia is not granted they must be removed as soon as possible. However, under the notion of complementary protection, an applicant who is not deemed to be a refugee may still be permitted to remain in Australia. Complementary protection applies when an applicant/s would face a real risk of; arbitrary deprivation of life; the death penalty; torture; cruel or inhuman treatment or punishment; degrading treatment or punishment. It does not apply when there is no real risk of significant harm, namely when an applicant can safely relocate to another part of the country, or an authority within the country can provide protection.

People who arrived by boat on or after 13 August 2012 are not able to propose that their immediate family members also gain entry to Australia.

A new "fast track" assessment scheme was introduced in 2014 via the Migration and Maritime Powers Legislation Amendment (Resolving the Asylum Legacy Caseload) Bill 2014 . The definition of a fast track applicant was narrowed further by Immigration Minister Peter Dutton in an amendment to the definition under the "Migration Act 1958", which changed the date of arrival requirement from January 2012 to August 2012 for parents whose children wished to be put classified as fast track applicants.

== Statistics ==
The pic measurement of historical migration flows are not accurate, as methods of counting and categorisations have changed over the years. Post-war refugee immigrants, from 1947 to 1975, totalled about 297,000 refugees, the majority assisted by the government. Since then, the annual refugee quota has varied from year to year.

According to the United Nations High Commissioner for Refugees, between 2005 and 2009 Australia was ranked 47th out of 198 countries in the world in terms of the number of refugees hosted, out of those countries who host refugees. In 2012, the Refugee Council of Australia ranked Australia 22nd on a per capita basis in a list of countries that accept refugees. The Council found that in terms of resettlement (as opposed to "receiving") asylum seekers, Australia ranks 2nd in the world overall, 3rd per capita and 3rd as a proportion of GDP. The Council provides a wide range of statistics on its website.

Australia's total refugee and humanitarian intake remained relatively constant between the mid-1980s and 2016, but peaked in 2017:

View source data.

In 2016-2017 financial year Australia accepted more refugees than it ever had since it started a dedicated humanitarian migration program, with 24,162 migrants settled on humanitarian grounds. The number includes a special intake of Syrian and Iraqi refugees owing to particular circumstances in ongoing conflicts. (This was part of a far broader migration program for the year; the total number of migrants was 225,941.)

The rate of arrivals by boat, the most controversial aspect of Australia's refugee policy, has been exceptionally volatile. It reached a peak of 20,587 people in 2013 (excluding crew), before falling again to zero two years later:

View source data.

A "fact check" produced by Australian Broadcasting Corporation News and RMIT concluded that then Attorney-General George Brandis' claim in November 2017 that Australia runs the most generous refugee program per capita in the world was misleading. Various complexities of the data are examined in the article, which says that Australia's level of refugee recognition is small compared to other wealthy nations (as well as poorer ones).

== Timeline ==
=== "White Australia policy": Post-federation - December 1901 ===
The White Australia policy is a term used for the historical policies responsible for the exclusion of non-European origin, especially Asians (primarily Chinese) and Pacific Islanders (primarily Melanesians) from immigrating to Australia.

=== World War II refugees: 1930s ===
In the 1930s more than 7,000 refugees from Nazi Germany were accepted into Australia. In the eight years after the end of World War II almost 200,000 European refugees settled in Australia. Australia was reluctant to recognise a general "right of asylum" for refugees when the Universal Declaration of Human Rights was being drafted.

=== West Papuan refugees on Manus Island: 1960s ===
University of Sydney immigration law specialist Professor Mary Crock says that Australia's history of offshore processing goes back to the 1960s, when Manus Island was set up to take refugees from West Papua. Known as "Salasia Camp", it consisted of a few corrugated iron houses on a bare concrete slab, not far from a beach near the main town Lorengau. Indonesia was preparing a military takeover of the former Dutch New Guinea colony in the 1960s, causing thousands of refugees to flee into the then Australian colony of Papua New Guinea; the first were sent to Manus in 1968 by the Australian government. The camp was built by Australia in order to avoid a diplomatic confrontation with Indonesia, and for this reason they were not granted refugee status. It was not a detention centre; the refugees were free to come and go, but remained stateless until granted citizenship by PNG in 2017.

=== Vietnamese boat people: 1970s ===
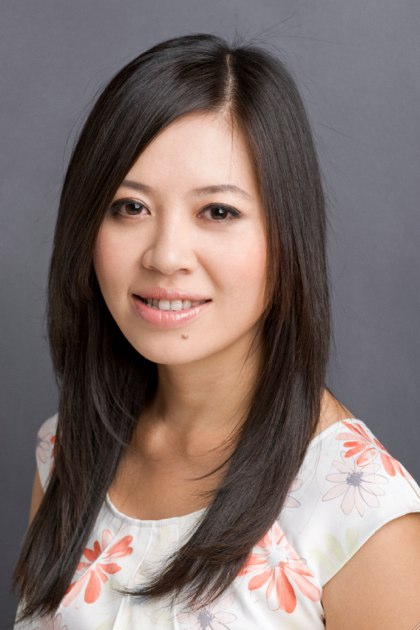
Tan Le entered Australia as a refugee in 1982 and was named Young Australian of the Year in 1998.

The first recorded instance of asylum seekers arriving in Australia via unauthorised boat occurred in April 1976. Fleeing South Vietnam after the Communist Party victory of 1975, an estimated 2,000 "Vietnamese boat people" followed between 1976 and 1982. The sporadic arrival of unauthorised boats was a cause of concern for the Australian people. The initial controversy regarding asylum seekers in Australia was mostly because of family reunions. Employment and security concerns were also raised with the Waterside Workers Federation calling for strikes on the matter. This led to the first detention of boat people. In response, the government of Malcolm Fraser authorised the immigration of more than 50,000 Vietnamese from Indian Ocean refugee camps. At the time, the "open door" immigration policy enjoyed bipartisan support.

Professor Crock says that a type of offshore processing was used after the Vietnam War. The regional processing regime established right across Southeast Asia was designed to stop asylum seekers where they were, process them in situ, and then to distribute them in an orderly way.

=== Mandatory detention: the 1990s ===
During the early 1990s, asylum seekers from Cambodia began to arrive in Australia. In response, the Keating government instituted a mandatory detention policy aimed at deterring refugees. Under mandatory detention, anyone who enters the Australian migration zone without a visa is placed in a holding facility while security and health checks are performed. Additionally, the validity of the person's claim to asylum is assessed by the Department of Immigration and Citizenship.

In 1990, a number of asylum seekers arrived from Somalia without documentation. They were detained at Villawood Immigration Detention Centre for 18 months without any progress on their status. Some began a hunger strike in response to the prolonged detention. Eventually, all were determined to be genuine refugees.

In the mid-1990s, numerous boats carrying Chinese and Sino-Vietnamese refugees were returned to their place of origin after asylum claims were denied. The rapid repatriations meant that many citizens were unaware of the refugees. During this period a refugee from Indonesia was detained for 707 days before being granted refugee status.

During the Kosovo War (1999), the Australian government conducted Operation Safe Haven and gave temporary asylum to 4000 Kosovo Albanians by housing them in military facilities. The event shaped a pivotal change in Australian government policy toward refugees by offering temporary asylum instead of permanent settlement.

In 1999, Middle Eastern immigrants fleeing from oppressive regimes in Afghanistan, Iran and Iraq began to arrive in large numbers. The Howard government extended the time they spent in mandatory detention and introduced temporary protection visas for boat arrivals. The deterrents did little to stop immigrants; roughly 12,000 asylum seekers reached Australia from 1999 to 2001.

=== Pacific Solution: 2001–2007 ===
"We will decide who comes to this country and the circumstances in which they come."

— John Howard

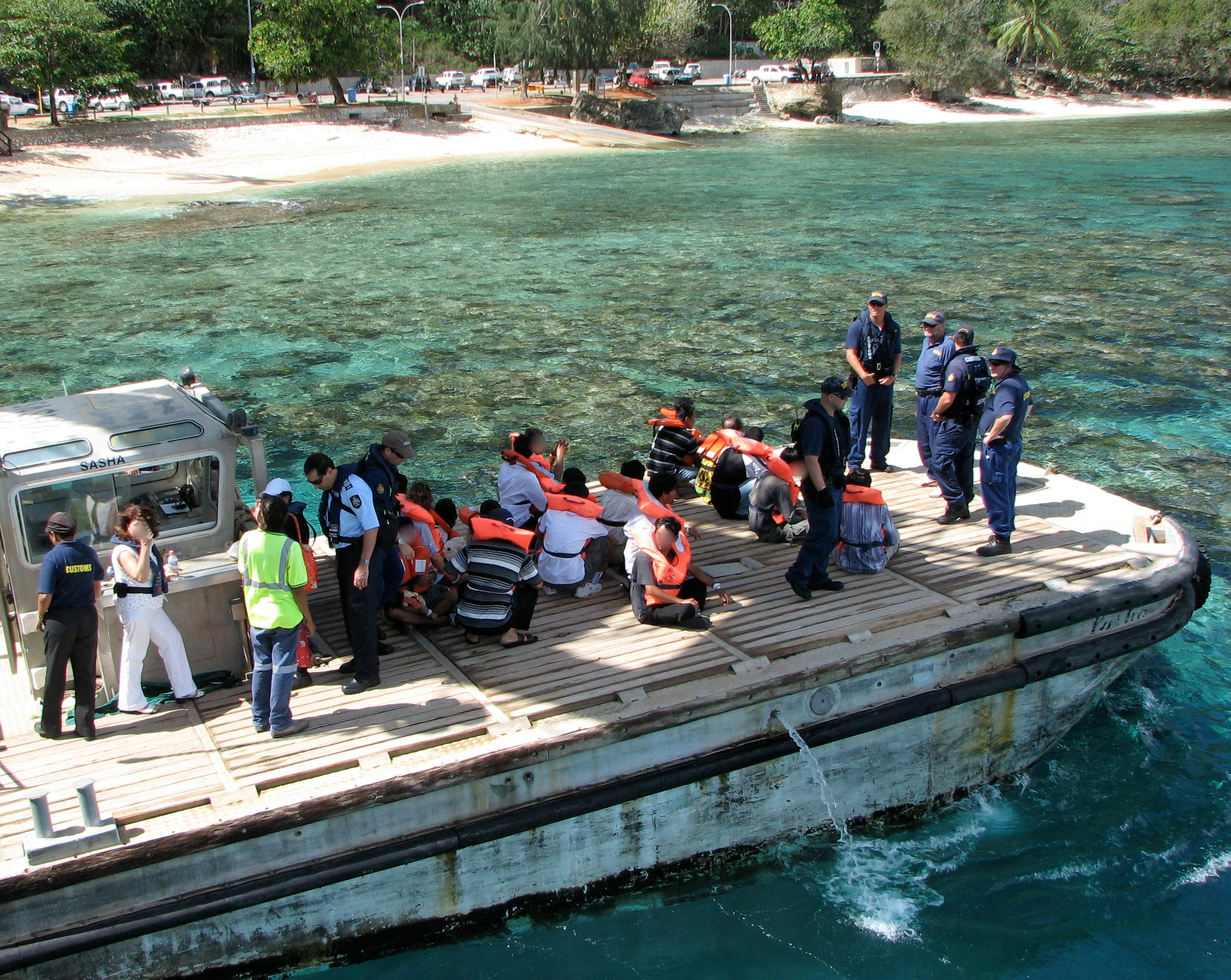
A Christmas Island boat transports rescued refugees

In August 2001, a Norwegian freight ship, the Tampa, picked up 438 people whose vessel was sinking off the coast of Indonesia. Captain Rinnan first tried to slowly turn the boat towards Indonesia, after being threatened with prosecution by the Australian government. However, after a while the mainly Afghan asylum seekers noticed, so, concerned that if the ship continued to sail to Indonesia they might jump overboard or riot and harm the crew, decided to head back towards Christmas Island. The Howard government refused to allow the boat to land, saying it was a matter for Norway and Indonesia to work out between themselves. Neither made a move, creating a three way diplomatic standoff which became known as the Tampa Affair. Australia seized control of the ship, drawing international criticism but strong support in Australia. After ten days, Australia struck a deal with New Zealand and Nauru to have those nations temporarily host the refugees while Australia processed their asylum claims.

Following the September 11 attacks in the US in 2001, anti-Muslim rhetoric increased in Australia, as Muslims were the primary asylum seekers at the time. Following the Tampa Affair, the Commonwealth Migration Act (1958) was amended by the Howard government in September 2001. The amendments, which became known as the Pacific Solution, excised Christmas Island and Ashmore Reef from the Australian migration zone. The Christmas Island Detention Centre, designed as a temporary holding centre, was set up, and asylum seekers were directed from there to nearby island nations Papua New Guinea, to be housed in the Manus Island Regional Processing Centre and Nauru, to the Nauru Regional Processing Centre. There, asylum seekers had to undergo a lengthy process before they could immigrate to Australia. The Pacific Solution was intended to remove the incentive for refugees to come to Australia. While detained offshore, asylum-seekers under the Pacific Solution were denied access to Australian lawyers and to protection under Australian law. The combination of the boat arrivals and the September 11 were said to have turned the November 2001 election in John Howard's favour.

At the time, the minority Labor Party opposed the policy. In 2003, Julia Gillard, then shadow minister for Population and Immigration, promised that Labor would end the Pacific Solution "because it is costly, unsustainable and wrong as a matter of principle". The policy was also highly criticised by human rights groups and refugees, including those imprisoned on Nauru who undertook hunger strikes from 2003 to 2008. The primary concern was that abuse of the process could potentially develop in remote locations, and that immigration control would dominate over child protection issues, children being without an effective guardian. In July 2005, Australia ceased the practice of mandatory detention of children.

In 2002, the arrivals dropped from 5,516 the previous year to 1. From 2001 to 2007, fewer than 300 asylum seekers arrived. The program cost Australia more than AU$1 billion during that period.

=== End of offshore processing: 2007–2012 ===
After winning the 2007 election, the Labor Party under Prime Minister Kevin Rudd abandoned the Pacific Solution, installing a more liberal asylum policy. The Rudd government pledged to settle all asylum claims within three months and closed the Nauru detention facility. It abolished temporary protection visas in 2008. Only 45 of the 1,637 asylum seekers detained in Nauru were found not to be refugees.

Over the next few years the number of asylum seekers arriving in the country increased substantially. According to parliamentary records, only 25 asylum seekers travelled by boat to Australia in the 2007–08 financial year. In 2008, there were 161 immigrants under asylum laws; in 2009, claims jumped to 2,800; in 2009–10, more than 5,000 people came. The issue quickly became a political problem for Rudd. He claimed it was a change in the international political environment that caused the increase, not the abandonment of the Pacific Solution. When that idea failed to be accepted, he proposed what became known as the Indonesian Solution. Under the plan, Indonesia would receive financial aid and intelligence in exchange for cracking down on the people smugglers that transported the asylum seekers.

Australia's refugee and humanitarian program
Year	Grants
2006–07	13,017
2007–08	13,014
2008–09	13,507
2009–10	13,770
2010–11	13,799
2011–12	13,759
2012–13	20,019
Source: Department of Immigration and Citizenship

In October 2009, the Australian customs boat Oceanic Viking was involved in an operation to apprehend 78 Sri Lankan asylum seekers and move them to an Australia-funded immigration detention centre on the Indonesian island of Bintan for processing. The asylum seekers were taken to Indonesia but refused to disembark until 17 November, after a deal was agreed upon. The asylum seekers were transferred to Indonesian detention, and after a month were determined to be refugees and resettled in several countries.

In December 2010, a boat carrying around 90 asylum seekers sank off the coast of Christmas Island, killing 48 people.

Ahead of the 2010 election, Tony Abbott campaigned on the asylum issue, and with Rudd refusing to engage with him in "a race to the bottom", polls showed the public strongly favouring Abbott's anti-asylum views. By this time, Rudd was struggling in the polls for a number of reasons and had lost the confidence of the Labor Party Caucus, which, fearing defeat in the upcoming election, installed Julia Gillard in his place. Gillard argued it was wrong to give special privileges to asylum seekers. She was against a return to the Pacific Solution, instead arguing for the establishment of a regional offshore processing centre. Gillard's new position was welcomed in the polls, and in the August 2010 election, Labor retained power in a minority government supported by a number of independents.

In May 2011, the Gillard government announced plans to address the issue by swapping 800 new asylum seekers for 4,000 long-standing assessed refugees in Malaysia. The so-called Malaysian Solution was eventually ruled unconstitutional by the high court, partly because Malaysia was not a signatory to the 1951 UN Refugee Convention.

In 2011, Australia received 2.5% of the world's total number of claims for asylum. During 2012, more than 17,000 asylum seekers arrived via boat. The majority of the refugees came from Afghanistan, Iran, and Sri Lanka. In June 2012, a boatload of asylum seekers capsized in the Indian Ocean between Indonesia and Christmas Island, leading to 17 confirmed deaths, with 70 other people missing.

=== Offshore processing resumed, PNG solution: 2012–2013 ===
In June 2012, Gillard appointed an expert panel to make recommendations on the asylum issue by August 2012. The report included 22 recommendations. Following their recommendations, her government effectively reinstated the Pacific Solution, and re-introduced offshore processing for asylum seekers. Some Labor members complained that Gillard had abandoned her principle for the sake of politics. Greens' Senator Sarah Hanson-Young called offshore processing "a completely unworkable, inhumane, unthinkable proposition". The Nauru processing facility was reopened in September, and the Manus Island facility in Papua New Guinea reopened in November. However, the centres could not keep up with demand, creating a large backlog. The first 6 months of the policy did not see a reduction in immigration attempts – in the first half of 2013, there were more than 15,000 asylum seekers. For the 6 months to June 2014 however, the number has appeared to sharply reduce, with the immigration minister Scott Morrison claiming that there "had (not been) a successful people smuggling venture" in the period.

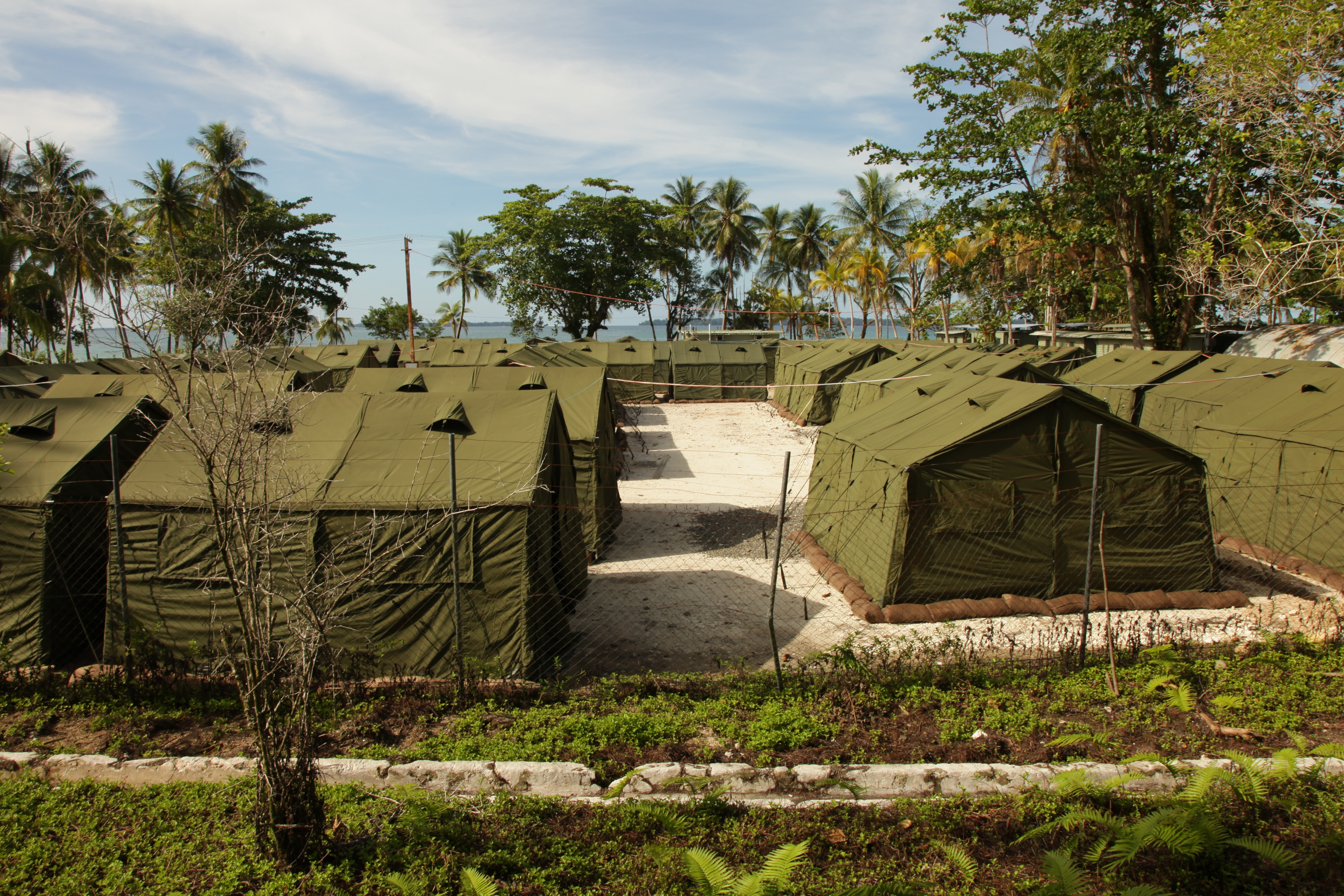
Part of the Manus Island regional processing facility in October 2012

In July 2013, Rudd, who had recently returned to power as Prime Minister, announced that anyone who arrived in Australia by boat without a visa would not be eligible for asylum. In co-operation with Papua New Guinean Prime Minister Peter O'Neill, the Regional Settlement Agreement was drafted. Under the agreement, new asylum seekers would be sent to Papua New Guinea where legitimate cases would be granted asylum in that, but would lose any right to seek asylum in Australia. To accommodate the refugees, the Manus Regional Processing Centre would be enlarged significantly. In exchange for taking the asylum seekers, Papua New Guinea would receive financial aid from Australia. Like Australia, Papua New Guinea is a signatory to United Nations Refugees Convention. Rudd said the policy was not intended to be permanent and would be reviewed annually.

Announcing the new policy, Rudd remarked "Australians have had enough of seeing people drowning in the waters to our north. Our country has had enough of people smugglers exploiting asylum seekers and seeing them drown on the high seas." Liberal Party leader Tony Abbott praised the substance of plan, but said Rudd's government was incapable of making it work. Greens leader Christine Milne, however, called the plan "absolutely immoral". Human rights groups criticised the decision. "Mark this day in history as the day Australia decided to turn its back on the world's most vulnerable people, closed the door and threw away the key," said Graeme McGregor of Amnesty International Australia. Human rights lawyer David Mann called it a "fundamental abrogation of Australia's responsibilities" and doubted the legality of the policy. He has also questioned the record of human rights in Papua New Guinea.

The New York Times described Rudd's decision as likely "part of a concerted effort" to nullify opposition attacks ahead of the 2013 federal election. He had been under fire for the unpopular programs of Gillard that led to his return to power, and immigration had become a major issue in the election campaign. Concurrent with Rudd's announcement, Indonesia announced it would toughen requirement for Iranians seeking visas, a change that had been requested by Australia. An Indonesia spokesperson denied that the change in policy was because of an Australian request.

The New York Times reported that more than 600 asylum seekers had died en route to Australian territory between 2009 and 2013. According to the Morrison government in 2019, more than 50,000 people had arrived by boat and at least 1,200 people drowned at sea during the Rudd-Gillard-Rudd years.

=== Operation Sovereign Borders: Sept 2013 ===
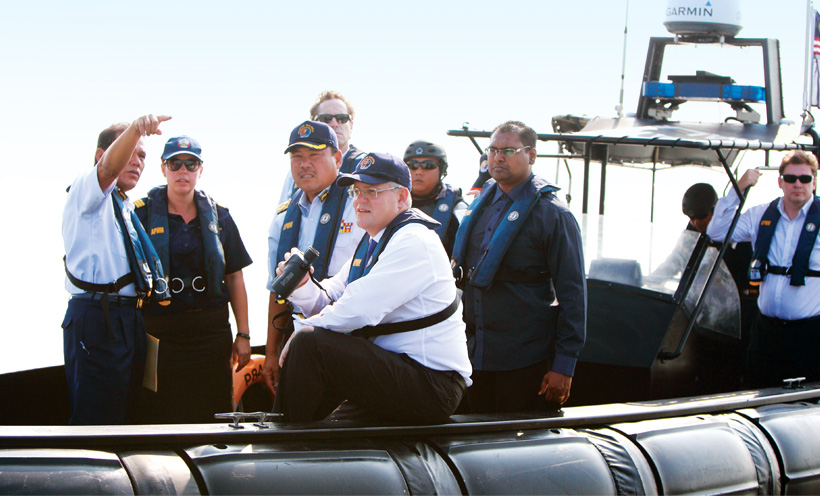
Then-Immigration Minister Scott Morrison visiting hotspots for people smuggling with the Malaysian Maritime Enforcement Agency in 2014

At the federal election on 7 September 2013, Abbott led the Liberal/National coalition to victory, to a large degree on the popularity of his "Stop the boats" slogan, after nearly 19,000 refugees had arrived by boat in the previous year (despite the number being relatively low by world standards). The Abbott government clamped down further on boat arrivals, naming their strategy Operation Sovereign Borders. This was implemented by then immigration minister Scott Morrison and continued by successor Peter Dutton from December 2014 and under prime ministers Malcolm Turnbull and Scott Morrison, as of November 2019. Their "zero tolerance" policies included the use of boat turn-backs, offshore detention and processing and tight control of information about any arrivals by the government.

In 2015, the government rejected suggestions that it would accept Rohingyas (a persecuted Muslim minority in Myanmar) during the Rohingya refugee crisis, with the Prime Minister Tony Abbott responding "Nope, nope, nope. We have a very clear refugee and humanitarian program". However, later in the year the government unexpectedly increased its intake of refugees to accommodate persecuted minorities, such as Maronites, Yazidis and Druze, from the conflicts of the Syrian Civil War and Iraq War. (It was these refugees who swelled the figures for 2016–2017.)

=== US refugee swap deal: 2016 ===
In 2016 Turnbull announced a new resettlement deal with the then US president Barack Obama, who agreed to take 1,250 of the refugees held on Manus Island and Nauru in exchange for Central American refugees coming to Australia. Upon taking office not long afterwards, Donald Trump was not pleased with the deal, but went on to honour it, and as of February 2019 more than 500 refugees had moved to the US.

=== Closure of Manus detention centre: 2017 ===
The centre was formally closed on 31 October 2017, but as of February 2019, there were 600 asylum seekers still housed on the island in several transit centres near the main town of Lorengau.

The Australian government ruled out bringing people held on Manus Island to Australia. New Zealand's offer to resettle 150 refugees within its existing quota was refused by the Australian Government several times. United States officials began assessing applications for asylum for refugees to be resettled in the United States as part of a deal struck with the Australian government.

=== Statistics and assessment: end 2018 ===
Over the period from the Abbott government through to the Morrison government, arrivals dropped to around 1,200. However, the conditions of those left on the islands has continued to garner national and worldwide attention. Immigration law specialist Professor Mary Crock said there was no statistical evidence that offshore processing itself deterred asylum seekers; it was rather boat push-backs that were more successful. People had become aware of the human cost as well as the monetary cost. "We've spent more on this than [the US$5 billion] Trump is asking for his wall," she said.

Public opinion seemed to be reflected in the polls at the October 2018 Wentworth by-election, after successful candidate Kerryn Phelps had urged voters to protest 'inhumane' refugee policies by voting for her.

=== Medevac Bill & re-opening of Christmas Island: Feb to Dec 2019 ===
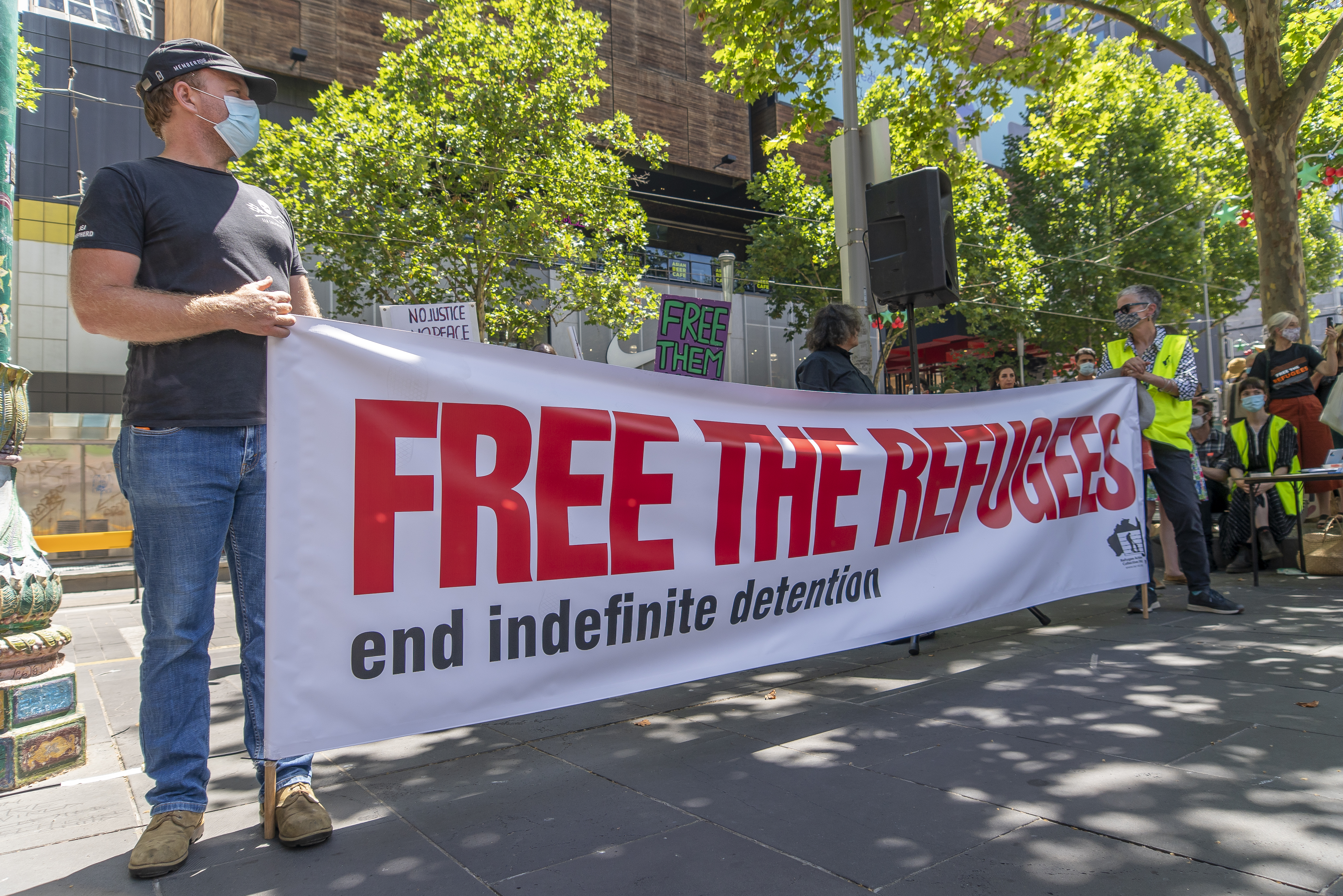
Rally called by the Refugee Action Collective, calling for the release of 60 Medevac refugees currently being detained in Park Hotel, Carlton.

On 13 February 2019, a bill which became known as the "Medevac bill" was narrowly passed by the Australian parliament allowing doctors to have more say in the process by which asylum seekers on Manus and Nauru may be brought to the mainland for treatment. The approval of two doctors is required, but approval may still be overridden by the home affairs minister in one of three areas. The fast-tracked medical transfers will only apply to the existing cohort of refugees and asylum seekers on Manus Island and Nauru, a point that Mr Morrison refuses to concede. Human rights advocates hailed the decision, with one calling it a "tipping point as a country", with the weight of public opinion believing that sick people need treatment.

A few days later, after warning about an influx of asylum seeker boats by both Dutton and Morrison, the prime minister announced the re-opening of the Christmas Island detention facilities, implying that this change in the law would provide the signal for people smugglers to begin operating again. The government later announced a plan to send sick refugees there, rather than hospitals on mainland Australia as was the intention of the Medevac bill. In the days following, Dutton said that because of this change in the law, Australians on waiting lists for hospital treatment and those already in public housing were going to be adversely affected.

This was seen by Robert Manne as a turning point in Labor Party policy, after having had almost identical asylum seeker policies as the Coalition for the past five years. He also points out the numerous obstacles any potential people smuggler or asylum seeker would have to face, because the deterrent aspects of the policy are still firmly in place, and the new legislation applies only to the approximately 1000 people still on Nauru and Manus (of whom only a relatively small number will be allowed to access the urgent medical attention they need).

In December 2019, the Medevac bill was repealed, after 37 votes to 35 in the senate supported the government's move to repeal the law.

=== "Biloela family" asylum seekers ===
In a long-running case in which a couple of Tamil asylum seekers, Kokilapathmapriya Nadesalingam (Priya) and Nadesalingam Murugappan (Nades), were refused refugee status after settling and starting a family in Biloela in central Queensland, the community rallied to support the family, who became known as "the Biloela family" in the press. The family was removed in a dawn raid on their home and taken to Melbourne in March 2018, pending deportation. Various legal avenues were pursued, with the family taken to Christmas Island Detention Centre in late August 2018. In April 2020 they were awarded costs of more than $200,000 against the federal government, for lack of procedural fairness in assessing their youngest daughter's claim. After election of a Labor government under prime minister Anthony Albanese, on 25 May 2022 interim home affairs minister Jim Chalmers granted the family a bridging visa which would allow the family to live and work in Biloela while they work towards the resolution of their immigration status.

=== March to May 2020 ===
In March 2020, Home Affairs told the Senate estimates committee that "211 refugees and asylum seekers remained on Nauru, 228 in Papua New Guinea, and about 1,220, including their dependents, were in Australia to receive medical treatment". Transfer and resettlement of approved refugees in the US was proceeding during the COVID-19 pandemic. 35 refugees left Port Moresby on 28 May 2020, and others would be flown from their places of detention within Australia, to be resettled in 18 US cities.

=== July to October 2021 ===
On 31 July 2021, there were 124 adults remaining in PNG and 107 on Nauru.

In September 2021, the Minister for Home Affairs signed a new deal with Nauru to keep an ongoing form of asylum seeker processing centre on the island.

In October 2021, the Australian Government cut off all support to the remaining men in PNG, leaving the PNG Government to take over responsibility for them. The remaining men were told that their options are transferring to the Nauru processing centre or resettling in PNG.

=== December 2021 – July 2022 ===
As of December 2021, there were 2,352 "Irregular Maritime Arrivals" (IMAs) who had applied for a protection visa and whose bridging visa had expired; there are no statistics for non-IMAs under the same conditions. This group has no access to services like Medicare, no Centrelink (social security) payments or other social services, and are not allowed to work. They rely on free food from charities, A$400 given to them in cash by the Australian Red Cross each month, and live in overcrowded, rundown properties together.

It was estimated in July 2022 that there were around 100,000 asylum seekers in Australia, with around 30,000 of those whose applications for refugee status have been rejected, and the rest status as yet undetermined, or on temporary visas.

== Changes in 2016 ==
A number of changes were implemented in July 2016 in relation to mandatory detention, both broadening opportunities for community integration by offering community alternatives and narrowing release through the creation of new immigration status designations. These included:

Community placements

Those granted bridging visas are able to access basic government services, including Centrelink and Medicare. They are able to move freely within their community, but are unable to choose the community that they live in, required to live an address designated by the Minister for Immigration and Border Protection.

Work rights

For the designated refugees that are eligible for work, many are prevented from entering the work force owing to issues of cultural competency and language. The overall effect is that the great majority of refugees in Australia are eager to workout without any pathways into the Australian work force.

Refugees with adverse security assessment

Introduction of a new category of designated immigration status: adverse security assessments.

Visa cancellations and the Border Force Act

The Australian Border Force Act 2015 (Cth) makes it a crime punishment of two years imprisonment for an entrusted person to make record of or disclose "protected information". This raises issues relating to judicial power: by denying the court's access to information by which to evaluate a matter, it constitutes an impermissible interference on the functions of a court, following the decision in Graham v Minister for Immigration and Border Control. The matter was not fully resolved as of 2016.

== Arrival and processing in mainland Australia ==
After arriving in Australia, the experience for any individual persons seeking asylum is largely impacted by the location they are placed, socioeconomic status, country of origin, age, sex and knowledge of the area, including family or friends that were in Australia prior to their arrival. Nonetheless, there are recurrent difficulties that surface continuously in asylum seeker communities across Australia, in the interim between arrival and refugee status determination.

=== Housing ===
For asylum seekers that arrive in Australia and receive a temporary protection visa (subclass 785), they are given the right to live in the community and are largely given autonomy to choose housing. The Australian government does not provide services to link asylum seekers with potential housing. Their ephemeral status in the country, entirely dependent on status determination by the government, leads to apprehension amongst housing providers arising from concern that they may not remain in Australia for the duration of the lease. The lack of clarity and certainty owing to their undefined legal status therefore deters housing providers from offering leases to asylum seekers.

Compounding this factor is the exceptionally low income for most asylum seekers, arising from their inability to work legally in Australia (an issue that will be comprehensively discussed below). These low wages limit housing options for asylum seekers and leaves them susceptible to a higher risk of exploitation. Substandard housing conditions clearly follows from this difficulty. One instance in Adelaide found 20 temporary protection visa holders living in a single address, while a service provider in Sydney reported instances where people seeking asylum had been convinced by real estate agents to rent non-residential properties such as warehouses with dividers between the beds.

General issues prevalent across most major cities in Australia in relation to housing are compounded in severity for asylum seekers. Housing affordability for most areas in proximity to city centres has become out of reach for both buyers and renters. In the two largest cities of Sydney and Melbourne, housing availability is an additional strain for renters, with a competitive market leading to some perpetually searching for housing. The impact these general issues have on asylum seekers searching for housing open arrival into Australia is therefore significant and, at times, debilitating, leading to substantial possibility of homelessness throughout these communities.

=== Income and work rights ===
Asylum seekers in Australia are precluded from the ability to work until a determination is made on their refugee status. The timeline for status determination varies considerably on a case-by-case basis. Until the passage of the Migration and Maritime Powers (Resolving the Asylum Legacy Caseload) Act 2015 (Cth), the Commonwealth was required to report the percentage of decisions made within 90 days of lodging their application. From 2013 to 2014, the Department of Immigration and Border Protection made just seven percent of initial decisions within the given timeframe. While more current data is unavailable, it is unlikely that the change of Liberal leadership (and therefore government) from Abbott to Turnbull has raised these rates. This means that it is likely that the overwhelming majority of asylum seekers in Australia are unable to work for well over three months while they wait for status determination.

The lack of ability to work forces asylum seekers in Australia to rely heavily on Centrelink payments. Their capacity to earn is then greatly reduced and there is an identifiable gap in the interstice between application for refugee status and refugee status determination where asylum seekers in Australia are placed into a tenuous financial position.

The bleak outlook on income are working rights so described leads to a direct impact on the mental health of the asylum seeker community. For those asylum seekers that go on to be recognised as legally defined refugees, the labour opportunities are largely seen as a window dressing exercise. The support given is unspecialised, with Jobactive largely ignoring the unique difficulties newly recognised refugees possess when searching for and obtaining work.

=== Procedural challenges ===
The Status Resolution Support Services (SSRS) is the Department of Immigration and Border Protection's replacement for the previous Community Assistance Program that is meant to connect migrants and non-citizens with social services. The services are delivered under six different bands that vary dependent upon identity and timeline of asylum. There are issues latent within the SSRS arising from a strict adherence to the band taxonomy that leads to a stringent, and at times problematic, application of the band criteria. There is the additional strain of a high caseworker to client ratio of 1:120, which has largely been viewed as a compromise on quality.

The Code of Behaviour is an agreement asylum seekers sign when arriving in Australia that largely binds them to certain standards of behaviour while awaiting refugee status determination. This has been received by the community as casting a dark shadow for asylum seekers' experience in Australia, with many of the signees feeling that the agreement creates uncertainty and confusion as to which actions may jeopardise their applications. The effect of the Code of Behaviour has deterred refugees from community events out of fear that their participation could contribute to a denial of their applications.

== Public debate and politics ==
Opinion polls show that boat arrivals have always been an issue of concern to the Australian public, but opposition has increased steadily over the previous four decades, according to a 2013 research paper by the Parliamentary Library.

In 2005, the wrongful incarceration of Cornelia Rau was made public through the Palmer Inquiry, which stimulated concern in the Australian public about the detention of children in remote locations and the potential for resultant long-term psychological harm.

Between 1998 and 2008, the UN Human Rights Committee made adverse findings against Australia in a number of immigration detention cases, concluding that Australia had violated the prohibition on arbitrary detention in Article 9(1) of the International Covenant on Civil and Political Rights. The longest-held detainee within the Australian immigration detention system was Peter Qasim, who was detained for six years and ten months.

In March 2012, former Prime Minister Paul Keating said there were "racial undertones" to the debate and that Australia's reputation in Asia was being damaged. In 2013, former Prime Minister Malcolm Fraser described the positions of the major political parties as a "race to the bottom".

In 2003, economist Ross Gittins, a columnist at Fairfax Media, said former Prime Minister John Howard had been "a tricky chap " on immigration, by appearing "tough" on illegal immigration to win support from the working class, while simultaneously winning support from employers with high legal immigration.

In one of many protests that had taken place around Australia over asylum seeker policy activists disrupted the Australian Open men's tennis final in 2015. Demonstrators in the crowd and on court raised banners and wore t-shirts that read “Australia open for refugees".

In 2016, the Special Rapporteur on the human rights of migrants of the United Nations, François Crépeau, criticised Australia's policies of mandatory and off-shore immigration detention. Crépeau claimed that Australia had adopted a "punitive approach" towards migrants who arrived by boat which had served to "erode their human rights".

The attempted deportation of the Sri Lankan Tamil Murugappan family was the subject of significant media attention in 2019, which continued until they were allowed back to Biloela in 2022.

== See also ==
- Asylum Seeker Resource Centre
- Children Overboard affair
- Craig Foster, advocate
- Human rights in Australia
- Immigration detention in Australia
- List of Australian immigration detention facilities
- List of Sri Lankan Tamil Asylum Seeker Suicides in Australia
- Stateless (TV series)
