= Refugees in Indonesia =

As Indonesia did not sign the convention on the status of refugees and lacks any domestic legislations providing refugees rights, refugees in Indonesia do not have the right to employment, permanent residency or citizenship.

As of 2020, there were 13,745 registered refugees temporarily living in Indonesia, most hoping for resettlement elsewhere. They live in precarious circumstances of poverty, unsanitary living conditions and no access to education. These circumstances have a negative effect on their health, including their mental health.

== Demographics of refugees ==
At the end of 2020, there were 13,745 refugees in Indonesia who had fled from 50 countries, the majority of them were from Afghanistan many are Rohingya.

== Legal rights of refugees ==
=== Rights in Indonesia ===
Indonesia is not a signatory to the 1951 Refugee Convention nor its 1967 Protocol, and there are no Indonesian laws that provide any rights to refugees. Consequently, the Indonesian government does not perform any assessments of refugees' needs nor do they have any rights to access employment, start a business, or any pathway to get permanent residency or citizenship. Indonesia authorities are perceived to take an "attitude of tolerance" towards refugees.

Registration in with United Nations High Commissioner for Refugees in Jakarta does provide refugees with asylum's seekers identification cards, which permits them to stay in Indonesia. The International Organization for Migration provides basic housing.

In late 2016, the President of Indonesia signed a petition called “The Presidential Regulation on the Handling of Refugees”, stating that needs and safety information should fall under government's responsibility in the future.

=== Wider geopolitics ===
The refugee policies of USA and Australia have created circumstances such that refugees become "stranded" in Indonesia.

Since 2000, the Australian government has funded Indonesian border patrols. Between 2001 and 2018, Australia provided $350-million to the International Organization for Migration (IOM) to fund community housing in Indonesia, drawing accusations that IOM is an outsourced arm of the Australian Border Force.

=== Criticism ===
Living conditions provided by the IOM were described by the Refugee Council of Australia as inhumane, noting "solitary confinement, lack of basic essentials and medical care, physical and sexual abuse, and severe overcrowding". Rohingya refugee John Joniad described the housing as an "open prison" in 2022.

The role that the IOM played was described as "blue-washing", using United Nations agencies "to present a humanitarian veneer while carrying out rights-violating activities on behalf of Western nations" by researchers Asher Hirsch and Cameron Doig in The Globe and Mail newspaper in 2022.

== Duration of stay ==
Refugees find themselves in Indonesia commonly because they intended to pass through Indonesia temporarily on their way to other places such as Australia or Malaysia, or because they have been forcibly relocated to Indonesia by Australian authorities as a consequence of agreements between the Australian and Indonesian government.

The lack of ability to integrate, work for pay, or gain permanent resident status strongly incentivises refugees towards staying in Indonesia as short a time as possible, but resettlement elsewhere is the only logical route out of Indonesia for refugees, and that rarely takes less than two years. 2022 reporting in The Globe and Mail included the story of a Karim Ullah, a Rohingya refugee who has lived in Pekanbaru for eleven years.

== Risks to refugees ==
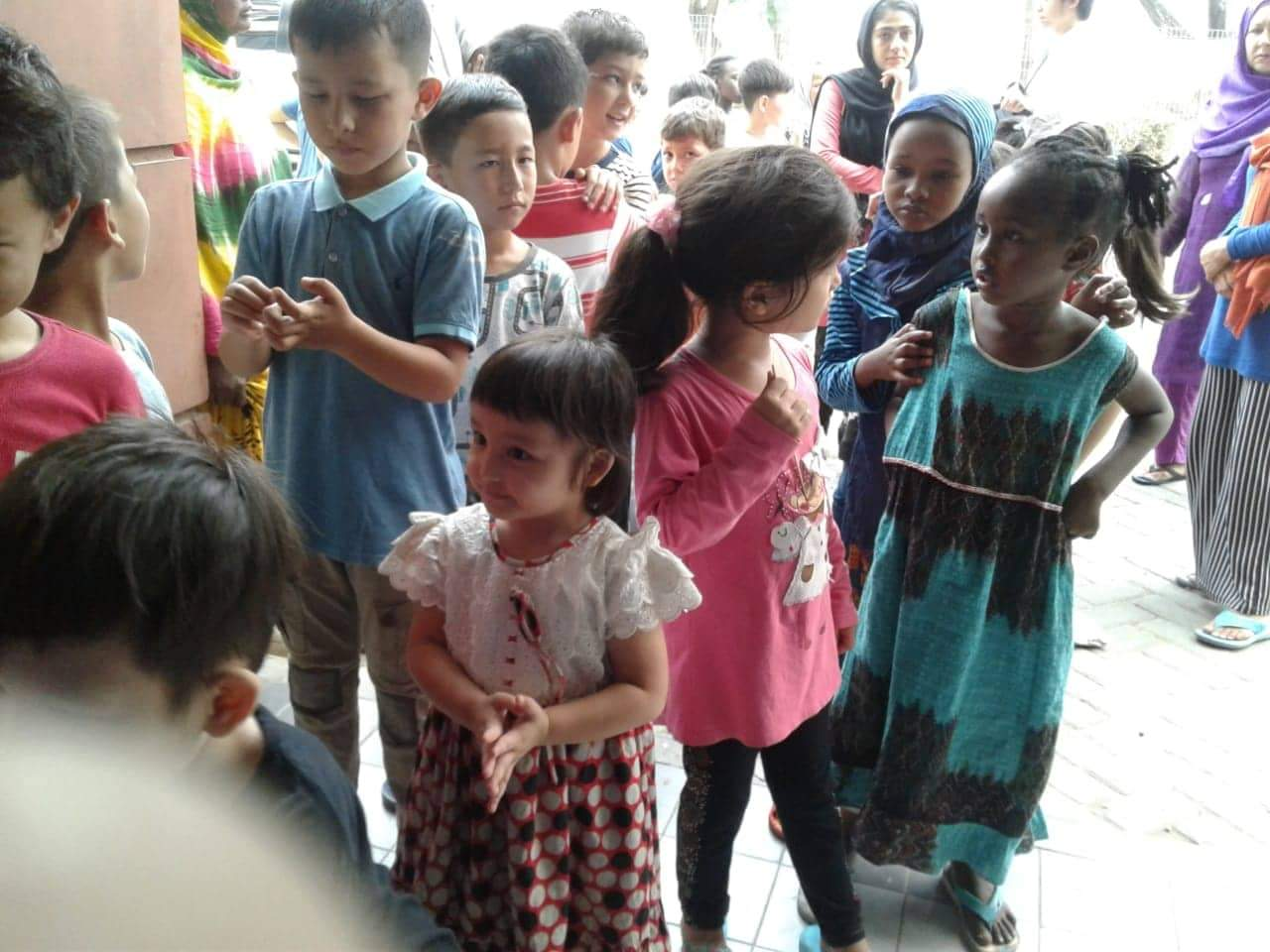
A photo of several refugee kids at a shelter in Kalideres, Indonesia

The combination of poverty, lack of government protection makes refugees in Indonesia easy targets for theft from authorities and people smugglers. Refugees lack safety, and are subject to boredom, which leads to mental health conditions. No education is provided to child refugees.

Refugee's health is impacted by poverty and unsanitary living conditions, which can include living in tents.

== Controversies ==
On 27 December 2023, hundreds of students from various universities in Aceh, such as Abulyatama University, Bina Bangsa Getsempena University, and University of Muhammadiyah Aceh, stormed a shelter for Rohingya refugees and forced them out of a convention centre in the city of Banda Aceh, demanding they be deported. The students also seen kicking the belongings of the Rohingya men, women, and children who were seated on the floor and crying in fear. They burned tyres and chanted “Kick them out” and “Reject Rohingya in Aceh”.

== See also ==
- Asylum in Australia
- Immigration detention in Australia
- Pacific Solution
