= HMAS Pirie =

Two ships of the Royal Australian Navy (RAN) have been named HMAS Pirie, after the city of Port Pirie, South Australia.

- HMAS Pirie (J189), a Bathurst-class corvette commissioned in 1942 and sold to the Turkish Navy in 1946
- HMAS Pirie (ACPB 87), an Armidale-class patrol boat commissioned in 2006 and decommissioned in 2021.

== Battle honours ==
Three battle honours were earned by the first HMAS Pirie, and are carried by all subsequent ships of the name:

- Pacific 1942–45
- New Guinea 1943–44
- Okinawa 1945
