= Illegal immigration to Australia =

Illegal immigration to Australia is defined by the Migration Act 1958, which distinguishes between "lawful non-citizens" (those in Australia holding a valid visa) and "unlawful non-citizens" (those without a valid visa).

Immigration to Australia is administered by the Department of Home Affairs, formerly the Department of Immigration and Border Protection, and before that the Department of Immigration and Citizenship (DIAC).

According to the Australian Bureau of Statistics, the majority of people in Australia illegally are visa overstayers, who enter the country legally but remain there after the expiry or revocation of their visa. DIAC estimated that in the period from 1 July 2009 to 30 June 2010, approximately 15,800 people overstayed their visas out of 4.5 million temporary entrants during that period (about 0.35 per cent). As of 30 June 2010, DIAC estimated that the number of visa overstayers in Australia was around 53,900, or 0.2 per cent of the Australian population.

In 2018, it was reported more than 60,000 foreigners are living illegally in Australia, and by 2021 it was reported that increased to more than 100,000.

== Immigration detention ==
Australia operates a number of immigration detention facilities within the country, as well as several offshore processing centres. All Australian immigration detention facilities are managed by the British services company Serco on behalf of the Australian government. Australia currently has three functioning offshore centres, and ten detention centres on the mainland. Facilities include Nauru, Christmas Island, and Manus Island.

=== Mandatory detention ===
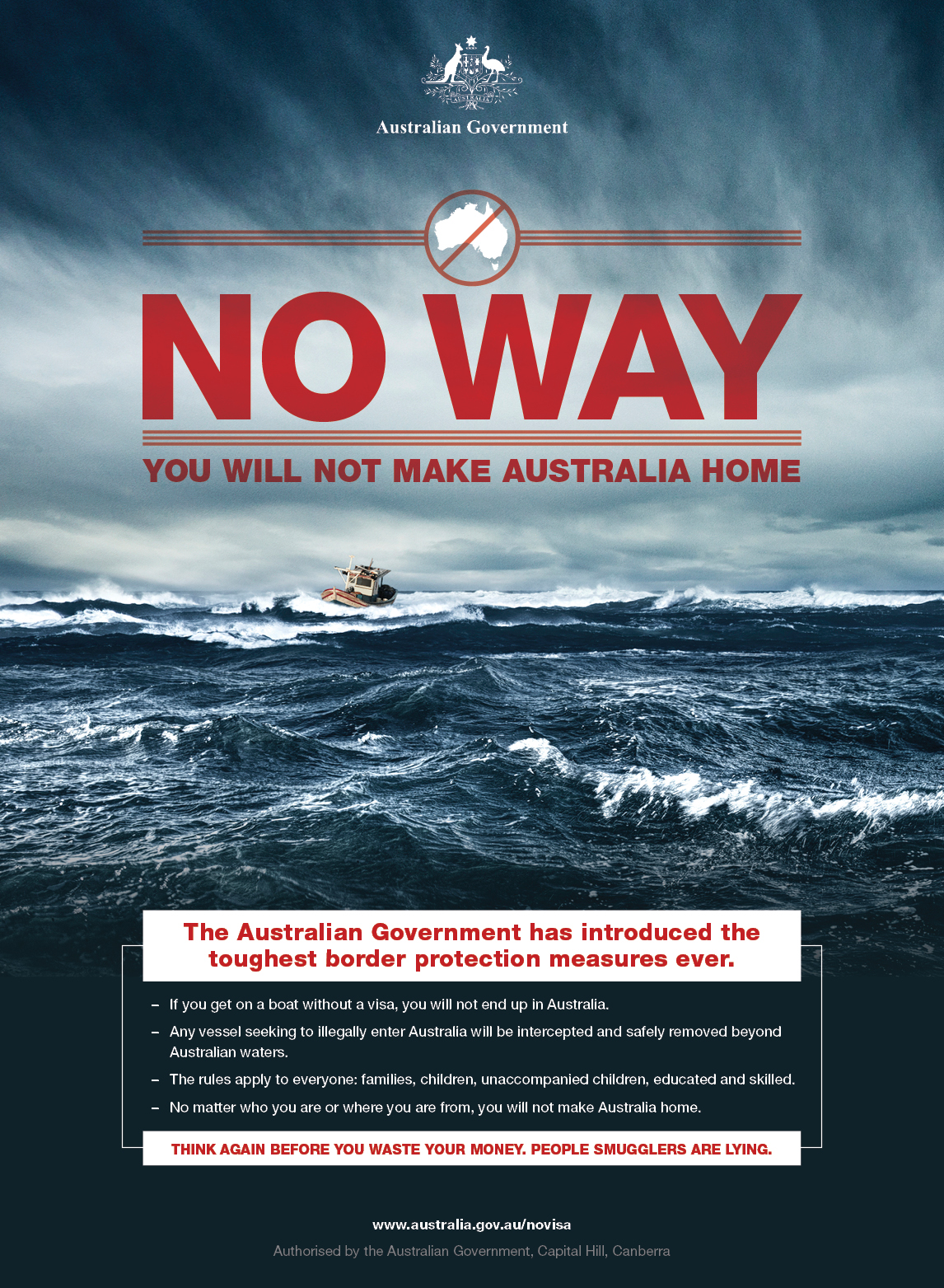
An example of an advertisement in the Operation Sovereign Borders campaign

Prior to 1992, the Migration Act 1958 permitted discretionary detainment of unlawful non-citizens. In 1992, the Keating government introduced a policy of mandatory detention, in response to a wave of boat arrivals from Indochina.

== Asylum seekers ==
As a signatory to the United Nations Convention relating to the Status of Refugees, Australia operates a humanitarian intake of migrants of around 13,770 persons per year (by comparison, Australia's Migration Program was 168,600 places in 2009–10). Those who have not gained prior approval to enter Australia for the purpose of seeking asylum were referred to as irregular arrivals.

There are two classifications for irregular arrivals: Illegal Maritime Arrivals (IMAs; prior to 2013 the term "Irregular Maritime Arrivals" was used) and non-IMAs (those arriving in Australian territory without a visa by non-maritime means, such as by air). In the 2011–12 period, the number of IMAs was greater than the number of non-IMAs for the first time.

In 2013, the Minister for Immigration, Scott Morrison, directed his department to use the term "illegal maritime arrivals" instead of the previous term "irregular maritime arrivals". The application of the term "illegal" to asylum seekers is controversial. While it is not a criminal offence to seek asylum in Australia, or to enter Australian territory without immigration documents for the purpose of seeking asylum, the Australian Broadcasting Corporation's Fact Check unit determined that the term was valid when referring to an arrival's entry status. In addition, the United Nations Protocol against the Smuggling of Migrants by Land, Sea and Air, to which Australia is a signatory, defines "illegal entry" as "crossing borders without complying with the necessary requirements for legal entry into the receiving State".

== See also ==
- Pacific Solution
