= Operation Sovereign Borders =

Australian immigration policy

Operation Sovereign Borders (OSB) is a border protection operation led by the Australian Border Force, aimed at stopping maritime arrivals of asylum seekers to Australia. The operation is the outcome of a 2013 federal election policy of the Coalition, which commenced on 18 September 2013 after the election of the Abbott government. The operation has implemented a "zero tolerance" posture towards what it has termed "Illegal Maritime Arrivals" − a change in terminology from the previous government's "Irregular Maritime Arrivals" − in Australia, in conjunction with mandatory detention in offshore detention facilities.

The current Commander of Operation Sovereign Borders, Rear Admiral Brett Sonter, was appointed to the command on 10 January 2024.

== Background ==
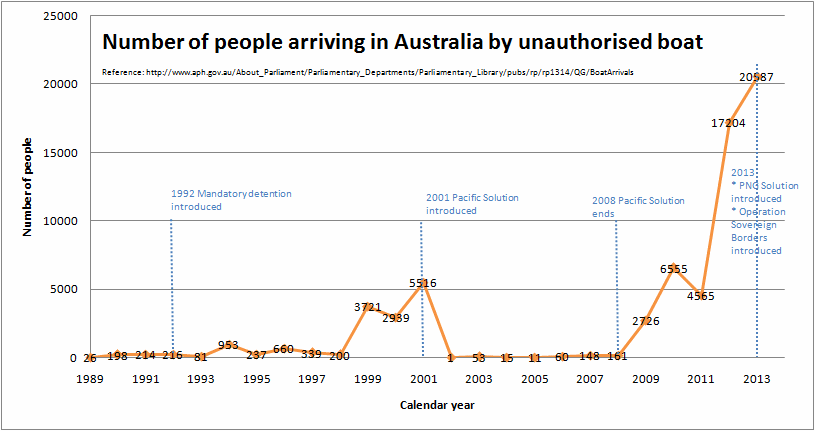
Persons arriving by unauthorized boat to Australia by calendar year

During the 2013 federal election, the Abbott-led Coalition campaigned on a policy that, if elected to government, they would "stop the boats" and would launch Operation Sovereign Borders, combining the resources of multiple government bodies under direct control of a three star general. Following the election, Angus Campbell was promoted and appointed to oversee the operations.

Following the 2013 election, the portfolio of the Minister for Immigration was renamed as the Minister for Immigration and Border Protection. The appointed ministers, initially Scott Morrison and subsequently Peter Dutton, refused to release information on asylum seeker boat arrivals as they occurred, and a weekly media briefing was announced. In January 2014, having not held a media briefing for almost a month, Morrison announced that briefings would be held on what he described as "an as needs basis". On 10 July 2014, Morrison stated that the secrecy policy was put in place by Lieutenant General Campbell, which had been rigorously implemented by ministers, their advisers, and various government departments.

== Policy proposals ==
=== Regional Deterrence Framework ===
On 23 August 2013, during the election campaign, the Coalition announced a key component of Operation Sovereign Borders called the Regional Deterrence Framework. Budgeted at A$420 million, the RDF aimed to engage with other countries in the region, particularly Indonesia, to prevent asylum seeker vessels leaving for Australia. The framework included a $20 million proposal (titled "The Indonesian community engagement programme") which was to include:

- Communications campaigns to raise awareness within local villages that people smuggling is a criminal activity;
- A capped boat buy-back scheme that was to provide an incentive for owners of decrepit and dangerously unsafe boats to sell their boats to government officials rather than people smugglers;
- Support for wardens in local communities, whose role was to be to provide intelligence information to the Indonesian National Police on people smuggling operations;
- the option in exceptional circumstances for bounty payments for the provision of information resulting in significant disruptions or arrests leading to convictions.

The "buy-the-boats" plan was widely ridiculed, with fact-checking group PolitiFact Australia calling the proposal "ridiculous". Lieutenant General Campbell told a Senate Estimates committee that, two months into the OSB program, no boats had been purchased because Indonesia did not support the idea, although he stated that the measure remained available.

=== Communication campaign ===
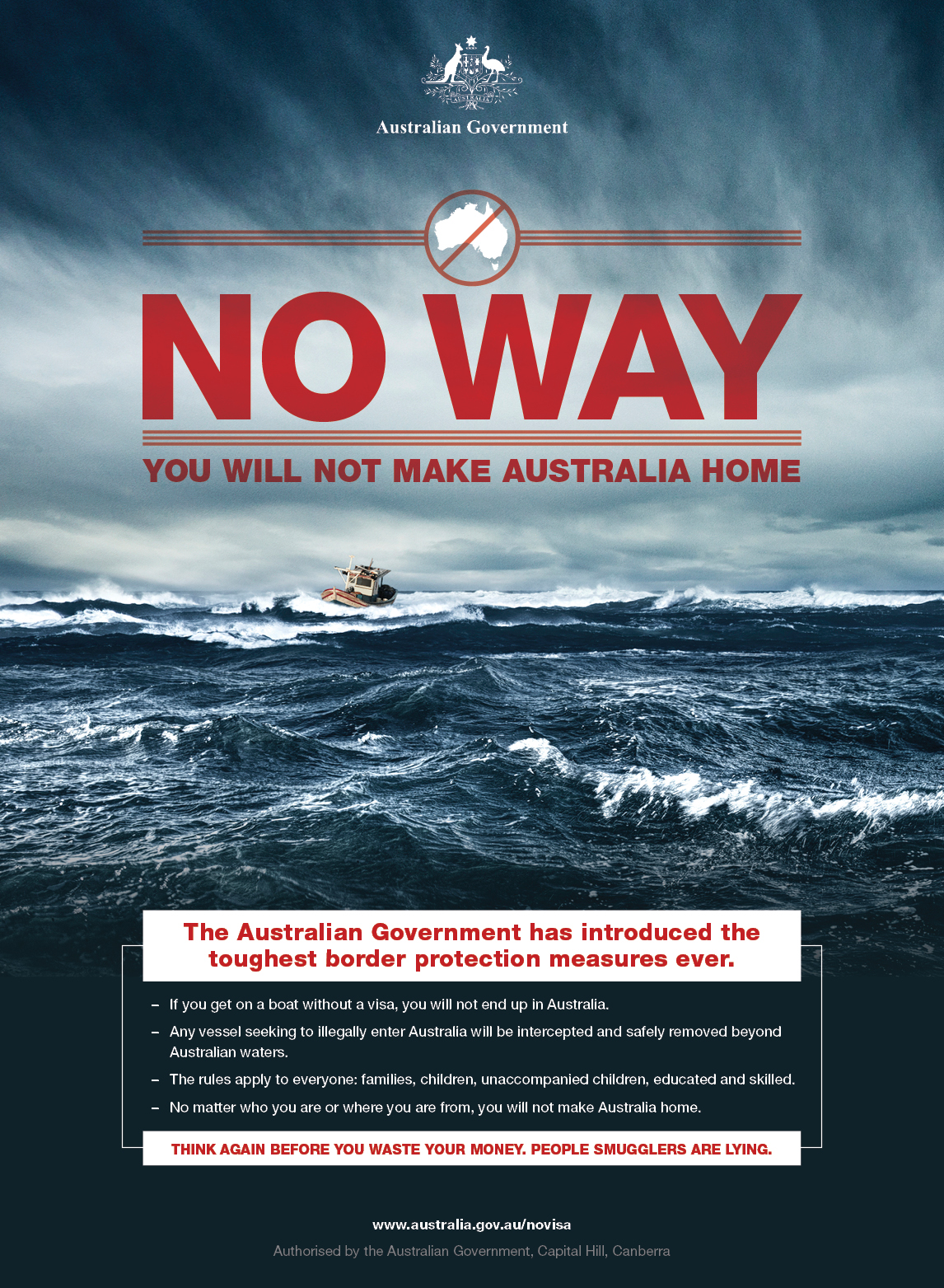
An example of an advertisement in the campaign

The government runs a "communication campaign to counter people smuggling" with advertisements in multiple languages, targeting "press, radio, social and search media" across Australia. Between January and May 2015, $750,000 had been spent on the campaign.

== Structure ==
Operation Sovereign Borders operates as a Joint Agency Taskforce (JATF), with the support of a range of government agencies, organised as three operational task groups:

- Detection, Interception and Transfer Task Group – led by the Australian Border Force (incorporating Maritime Border Command)
- Disruption and Deterrence Task Group – led by the Australian Federal Police
- Offshore Detention and Returns Task Group – led by the Australian Border Force

=== Commanders ===
Rank	Name	Post-nominals	Service	Term began	Term ended
Lieutenant General	Angus Campbell	DSC, AM	Army	18 September 2013	16 May 2015
Major General	Andrew Bottrell	CSC & Bar, DSM	Army	16 May 2015	1 February 2017
Air Vice Marshal	Stephen Osborne	AM, CSC	RAAF	1 February 2017	14 December 2018
Major General	Craig Furini	AM, CSC	Army	14 December 2018	28 August 2020
Rear Admiral	Lee Goddard	CSC	RAN	28 August 2020	11 December 2020
Rear Admiral	Mark Hill	AM, CSC	RAN	15 December 2020	4 February 2022
Rear Admiral	Justin Jones	CSC	RAN	4 February 2022	10 January 2024
Rear Admiral	Brett Sonter		RAN	10 January 2024	Incumbent

== Outcomes ==
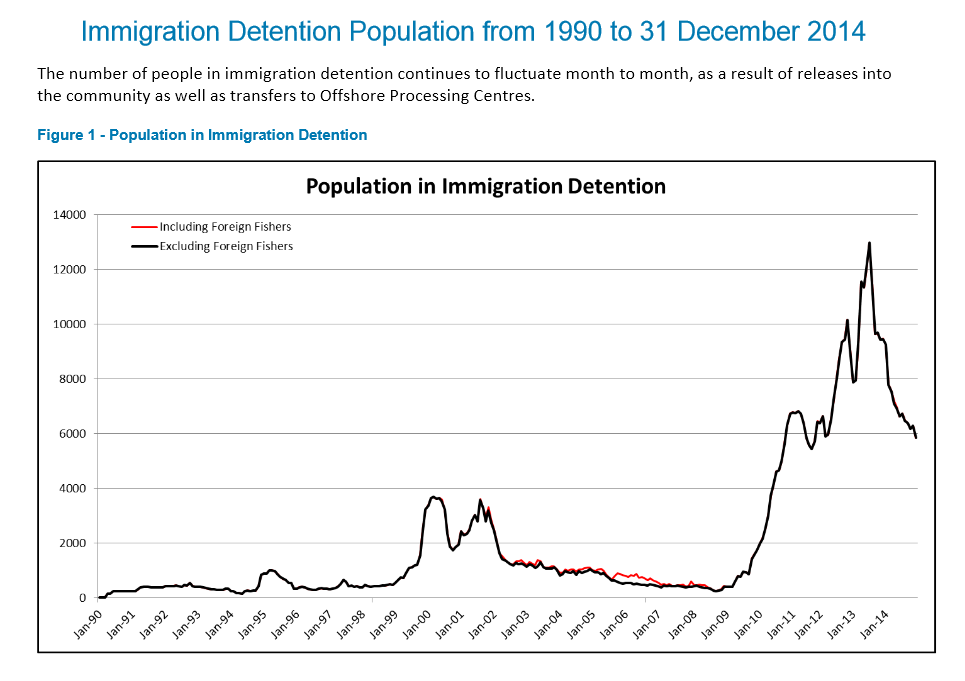
Immigration Detention Population to December 2014

Abbott's government claimed a ninety per cent reduction in maritime arrivals of asylum seekers. There were 207 in November 2013, as opposed to 2,629 in November 2012.

In response, Shadow Minister for Immigration and Border Protection Richard Marles claimed there was a 40 per cent reduction in arrivals in the month following the introduction of the Regional Resettlement Arrangement with Papua New Guinea, shortly before the 2013 election.

On 19 June 2014, the Government announced that it had been six months since the last successful boat arrival.

=== July 2014: Legal challenge ===
On 7 July 2014, a vessel containing 153 mostly Tamil asylum seekers from Sri Lanka was intercepted by Australian authorities 27 kilometres (15 nmi) from Christmas Island. The government refused to confirm the existence, location, or status of the boat, until the High Court placed an injunction on any attempted refoulement of the vessel's passengers to Sri Lanka, while the full bench of the Court considered a challenge to the handover on the grounds that the government was breaching non-refoulement obligations under international law. Under Article 33 of the UN Convention Relating to the Status of Refugees, to which Australia is a signatory, this principle forbids a nation state from sending a refugee back to anywhere where they may face persecution.

Pre-empting the decision of the court, Minister for Immigration and Border Protection Morrison announced that the people on the boat would be transferred to the Curtin Immigration Reception and Processing Centre in Western Australia, where they would be assessed by Indian consular officials under an arrangement made with that country to repatriate any Indian citizens or residents. On 2 August, Morrison announced that the group had refused to meet with Indian officials and were then transferred to the Nauru Regional Processing Centre.

The government's response was to rush through Parliament the Migration and Maritime Powers Legislation Amendment (Resolving the Asylum Legacy Caseload) Bill 2014, which was passed by both Houses in December 2014, placing border policing ahead of asylum seeker rights as expressed in UN Convention.

Unlawful arrivals by boat per month
Month	Boats	Persons	Notes
From 18 September 2013	5	205	
October 2013	5	339	
November 2013	5	207	
December 2013	7	355	
January 2014	0	1	
July 2014	1	157	
Source: "Operation Sovereign Borders: log of boat arrivals and other asylum seeker incidents". ABC News. Australia. Months with no arrivals are not listed.

=== Turnback operations ===
The number of arrivals given in OSB operational updates is defined as those "transferred to Australian immigration authorities", and does not include arrivals in Australian territorial waters who have been subject to a turnback operation—that is, sent out of Australian waters on their own vessel, or an Australian vessel employed for this purpose. As of 7 February 2014, The Australian newspaper estimated that at least "six boatloads" of asylum seekers had been subject to turnbacks by OSB authorities.

On 15 January 2014, an orange fibreglass "survival capsule", containing about 60 asylum seekers, came ashore at Cikepuh in West Java. A second containing 34 people arrived at Pangandaran on 5 February. The Daily Telegraph reported that the Australian government was believed to have purchased eleven of the capsules from Singapore at a cost of around $500,000.

In May 2014, Australia was alleged to have placed two persons who had arrived earlier in the year onto a boat with other asylum seekers which was turned back to Indonesia.

In January 2015, Minister Dutton announced that 15 vessels, containing 429 asylum seekers in total, had been subject to turnback operations of some kind towards Indonesia or Sri Lanka since the beginning of OSB.

In May 2015, Australian authorities allegedly paid Indonesian boat crew to return 65 asylum seekers to Indonesia. This and other turnbacks like it could be seen as tantamount to people smuggling against origin and transit countries.

In July 2015, Labor Shadow Minister Richard Marles conceded that "Offshore processing and regional resettlement, together with the Coalition's policy of turn-backs, is what actually stopped the boats".

On 6 August 2015, the new immigration minister Peter Dutton announced it had been 12 months since the last successful people smuggling operation, with the last SIEV arriving in Australia's care in July 2014. The ABC News' Fact Check subsequently listed the Coalition's "We Will Stop the Boats" promise as delivered. In August 2015, Dutton stated that, since December 2013, 633 people on 20 vessels have been subject to turnback operations, including a boat from Vietnam in July. In March 2016, Dutton stated that 698 people on 25 vessels had been turned back since the beginning of the OSB program.

=== Resettlement ===
In 2014, the status of asylum seekers sent to offshore processing centres in Nauru Regional Processing Centre and Manus Regional Processing Centre was decided: 13 people (9 people from Iran and 4 people from Pakistan) were granted asylum, while 7 people (from Iran, Pakistan, and Cameroon) received negative assessments. The asylum protection in Nauru was valid from 2014 for up to 5 years.

As of 2015, more than 400 people who had their refugee claims rejected had been returned home from the Australian-run detention centre in Papua New Guinea, some of which did so voluntarily.

== Response ==
=== Indonesian response ===
The Indonesian government has voiced concern over the operation due to its implications for Indonesia's national sovereignty. A member of the Golkar party, Tantowi Yahya, described the plan as "offensive", and officials from the Indonesian Navy said "forcing the boats back would also unfairly shift the burden of dealing with the asylum-seeker problem back on Indonesia". The policy also came under fire from refugee advocates.

On 26 September 2013, Indonesian Foreign Minister Marty Natalegawa took the "unusual step" of releasing details of his talks about the policy with his Australian counterpart Julie Bishop, which was later blamed on a clerical error.

Australia has apologised for violating Indonesian waters during their "tow back" operations. These incursions occurred after Chief of the Defence Force David Hurley stripped naval personnel of workplace safety protections that would have required them to exercise "reasonable care" to protect their safety and that of the refugees. On 21 January 2014, Customs (now Australian Border Force) and Defence announced that a joint review would be conducted to investigate the circumstances under which Australian naval vessels entered Indonesian territorial waters. The inquiry, which covered the period between 1 December 2013 and 20 January 2014, found that two Royal Australian Navy frigates had crossed into Indonesian territory four times during the period, while Customs vessels did so on another two occasions. In response, one Australian Navy officer lost his command, while several others were disciplined. Indonesia has responded to the incursions by deploying military assets to intercept people-smuggling boats.

=== Media response ===
Several journalists and media outlets have expressed concern and frustration over the tightly controlled release of information about Operation Sovereign Borders, usually restricted to the weekly briefings held on Friday afternoons. In the weekly briefings, both Minister Morrison and Lieutenant General Campbell have refused to discuss "operational" or "on-water" matters in response to questions from journalists. The Minister has rationalised the control of information by stating that the government was not "operating a shipping news service for people smugglers".

==== Allegations of navy mistreatment ====
On 22 January 2014, the ABC broadcast allegations that Royal Australian Navy personnel had mistreated asylum seekers during an OSB operation, including video footage of passengers receiving medical treatment in Indonesia for burns on their hands, which they claimed were sustained when they were forced to touch a hot boat engine. Morrison downplayed refugee claims of being abused by the Navy, and called for the ABC to apologise to the Navy. The ABC's Media Watch program opined that ABC News had "over-reached" when reporting the story, and should have been more thorough in verifying the claims. On 4 February, ABC managing director Mark Scott issued a statement saying "The wording around the ABC's initial reporting needed to be more precise on that point", referring to the video footage verifying the injuries but not how they had occurred. On 7 February, Yousif Ibrahim Fasher repeated the initial allegations, as well as several further claims of mistreatment and possible breaches of maritime law in an interview with a Fairfax correspondent.

=== Political focus on boat arrivals ===
Immigration law specialists, academics and others have criticised the political over-use of border control in general to win votes, and in particular of the exaggerated focus on boat arrivals being a danger to security and bringing illegal immigrants, when in fact the vast majority of illegal immigrants arrived by plane, with valid visas initially.

== See also ==
- Stop the boats
- Asylum in Australia
- Australian Border Force (est. 2015)
- Boat arrivals in Australia 1976–2013
- Immigration detention in Australia
- Manus Regional Processing Centre
- Operation Resolute, Australian Defence Force contribution to patrolling Australian waters, 2006–2013
- Nauru Regional Processing Centre
- Pacific Solution, previous policy to Sovereign Borders (2001–2007, then 2012–2013)
