= Operation Resolute =

Australian Defence Force contribution to patrolling Australiam territory

- Objective: Patrols of Australia's Exclusive Economic Zone
- Date: 17 July 2006
- Executed by: Maritime Border Command
- Outcome: Ongoing

Operation Resolute is the involvement of the Australian Defence Force (ADF) in Australian government efforts to prevent unauthorised entries to sovereign Australian territory. This has mainly taken the forms of: remote surveillance; air, sea and land patrols by ADF personnel; seizure of "suspected irregular entry vessels", and; locating/assisting people who have entered Australia via such a vessel (prior to the apprehension of such people by relevant civilian authorities). Operation Resolute began on 17 July 2006 and consolidated a number of previous ADF operations, including Operation Relex.

Operation Resolute is commanded by the joint civilian-military Maritime Border Command and the ADF contributes Royal Australian Navy ships, Royal Australian Air Force aircraft and patrols from the Australian Army's Regional Force Surveillance Units as required.

Defence personnel and civilians deployed may be eligible for the Australian Operational Service Medal, specifically the Australian Operational Service Medal – Border Protection (AOSM-BP).

== Op Resolute ==
17 July 2006 to 16 July 2006

Rotation	Date from	Date to	Major Fleet Unit(s)	Unit/Sub Unit
TSE 71	Oct 2013	Apr 2014	HMAS Stuart, HMAS Parramatta	1 BDE, 9 BDE, RAAF
TSE 72	Mar 2014	Jul 2014		4 BDE, RAAF

== See also ==
- Operation Sovereign Borders
