= Mary Crock =

Australian law academic and immigration lawyer

Mary Crock is a professor of public law at the University of Sydney and a member of the Sydney Centre for International Law. She specialises in immigration, citizenship and refugee law as well as human rights but is most well known for her work with refugees and asylum seekers. She has written many leading publications on Australian immigration and refugee law as well as research regarding the role of disability in this space.

Crock's commitment to justice and refugee rights began early in her life and believes that:

“Migrants and refugees really bring the world to Australia. Their stories telling us what they've lived through make real what we hear about in the news.”

— Mary Crock, as quoted in Refugee Advice & Casework Service, September 2025

She has worked with the United Nations High Commission for Refugees and has also served on a variety of national, state and non-government bodies.
