= Children Overboard affair =

2001 Australian political controversy

The Children Overboard affair was an Australian political controversy involving public allegations by Howard government ministers in the lead-up to the 2001 federal election, that seafaring asylum seekers had thrown children overboard in a presumed ploy to secure rescue and passage on 7 October 2001.

The government's handling of this and other events involving unauthorised arrivals worked to its advantage. The Tampa affair had led the government to adopt stricter border protection measures to prevent unauthorised arrivals from reaching Australia by boat. Polls indicated the measures had public support. The government under Prime Minister John Howard was able to portray itself as "strong" on border protection measures and its opponents as "weak". In November 2001, the Liberal–National coalition was re-elected with an increased majority.

The Australian Senate's Select Committee for an inquiry into a certain maritime incident later found that no children had been at risk of being thrown overboard and that the government had known this prior to the election.

== Background ==
In the early afternoon of 6 October 2001, HMAS Adelaide intercepted a southbound wooden-hulled vessel, designated SIEV 4 (Suspected Irregular Entry Vessel), carrying 223 passengers and crew, 100 nautical miles (190 km) north of Christmas Island, and the vessel then sank. The next day, which was the day before the issue of writs for the 2001 federal election, Immigration Minister Philip Ruddock announced that passengers of SIEV 4 had threatened to throw children overboard. This claim was later repeated by other senior government ministers including Defence Minister Peter Reith and Prime Minister Howard.

On 10 October 2021, ABC journalist Virginia Trioli interviewed Reith on Drive on 774 ABC Melbourne, expressing scepticism about some grainy photos provided by the Department of Defence just before the live interview, showing people wearing life jackets. Trioli later won a Walkley Award for her interview.

== Senate inquiry ==
A Select Committee inquiry, Select Committee for an inquiry into a certain maritime incident composed mainly of non-government senators, concluded on 23 October 2002. It found that no children were thrown overboard from SIEV 4, that the evidence did not support the Children Overboard claim, and that the photographs purported to show children thrown into the sea were taken after SIEV 4 sank. In response, Howard said that he acted on the intelligence he was given at the time. Although reports indicated that the strain of being towed was the proximate cause of the asylum seeker boat eventually sinking, Howard asserted that the asylum seekers "irresponsibly sank the damn boat, which put their children in the water".

The government was criticised for misleading the public and cynically "(exploiting) voters' fears of a wave of illegal immigrants by demonising asylum-seekers".

A minority dissenting report, authored by government senators on the committee, described the inquiry as driven by a "misplaced sense of self-righteous outrage [felt] by the Australian Labor Party at its defeat in the 2001 federal elections". An appendix to their report documented cases where passengers aboard other SIEVs had threatened children, sabotaged their own vessels, committed self-harm and, in the case of SIEV 7 on 22 October, thrown a child overboard who was rescued by another asylum seeker.

== Scrafton revelations ==
Michael Scrafton, a former senior advisor to Peter Reith, revealed on 16 August 2004 that he told Howard on 7 November 2001 that the Children Overboard claim might be untrue. Howard said that they only discussed the inconclusive nature of the video footage. In light of the new information, the Labor opposition called for further inquiry. Scrafton was interviewed on the ABC radio program The World Today on 1 September 2004 about his claims. Howard published media releases about the Scrafton claims.

On 29 August, Howard announced the 2004 federal election. On 1 September, a second inquiry composed mainly of non-government senators was convened. While the final report on 9 December found Scrafton's claims to be credible, government committee members questioned the reliability of Scrafton's recollections and wrote a minority dissenting report challenging that finding.

== See also ==
- Immigration to Australia
- Jane Halton, then Chair of the People Smuggling Taskforce
- Ruddock v Vadarlis
- SIEV X, which sank on 19 October 2001, just south of the Indonesian island of Java, killing 353 people
