= 2010 Christmas Island boat disaster =

Migrant boat disaster off Christmas Island, Australia

- Top: SIEV-221 prior to breakup; Middle: SIEV-221 shortly after initial collision; Bottom: HMAS Pirie officers rescue survivors.
- Date: 15 December 2010
- Time: 5:20am – 9:00am (Note: shiptime)
- Duration: 3 hours and 40 minutes
- Location: Near the coast of Rocky Point, Christmas Island, Australia; 10°25′1″S 105°40′24″E
- Type: Maritime disaster
- Cause: Vessel crushed against rocks by heavy waves
- Participants: Passengers and crew of SIEV-221, residents of Christmas Island, HMAS Pirie, ACV Triton
- Deaths: 50

On 15 December 2010, an Indonesian fishing boat (known as the Janga and referred to as SIEV-221 by Australian Government authorities) carrying 89 asylum seekers and 3 crew members sank after being dashed against the rocks near Rocky Point, Christmas Island, an external Australian territory. 50 people died and 42 were rescued. The incident was the worst civilian maritime disaster in Australia in more than a century.

== Background ==
Christmas island is an external Australian territory located approximately 360 kilometers to the south of Java, Indonesia and 2,660 kilometers from the Australian mainland. The island is a frequent destination for asylum seekers seeking to claim asylum on Australian soil, due to its proximity to Indonesia, which serves as a key transit country for people smugglers and asylum seekers in the region.

SIEV-221 (known by the passengers as the Janga) was a wooden Indonesian fishing boat around 15 meters long, which had been stripped of most equipment. There was no safety equipment on board other than around 20 life jackets. The vessel had been experiencing engine problems, for which the crew unsuccessfully sought maintenance.

The vessel was crewed by four Indonesians. Three were fishermen with limited seafaring experience, who were offered the equivalent of $2,000 to work on the boat. A fourth acted as captain.

The passengers were a group of 89 asylum seekers mainly from Iraq and Iran. There were 58 men and 34 women on board, from at least 8 different family groups.

On the morning of 12 December 2010, passengers were collected from hotels in Jakarta, Indonesia where they had been waiting for the voyage. They were driven to a remote coastal location, and loaded onto two small boats which transported them out to sea where they boarded SIEV-221.

Passengers had been told SIEV-221 was comfortable, safe and well equipped. However, they discovered that conditions on board were cramped, with people crowded above and below deck, and only a hole in the deck to use as a toilet. No instructions were provided to passengers about how to use life jackets or what to do in the case of an emergency.

SIEV-221 departed from Jakarta for Christmas Island around midnight on 12 December 2010. The main engine failed at one point during the voyage, but the crew were able to re-start it. The captain abandoned the boat just before the final leg of the journey, transferring to another vessel trailing behind. He gave the remaining crew members basic directions to Christmas Island and said they would arrive in around 5 hours.

== Incident ==
The shores of Christmas Island consist of jagged cliffs and, even in good weather, there are few locations where a boat can safely off-load passengers. The monsoon season meant the seas around the island were very rough on the morning of 15 December 2010, with wind speeds of 20 to 30 knots and wave height of up to 4 meters. The weather conditions restricted visibility to 150 meters. This was "amongst the worst weather ever experienced on the island".

SIEV-221 was first sighted by residents on Christmas island around 5:20am on 15 December. At that time the vessel appeared to be 400 to 600 meters away from the island and moving under its own motion. A trail of black smoke could be seen coming from its exhaust. It continued to make its way through heavy seas near the coast for around 40 minutes.

A number of residents phoned emergency services to report the presence of the vessel. Around the same time, passengers aboard SIEV-221 also began making emergency distress calls using their mobile phones, however Australian emergency services operators struggled to understand what passengers were saying due to language barriers.

Australian Customs and Border Protection vessels HMAS Pirie and ACV Triton were coincidentally nearby, sheltering from the weather to the east of Christmas Island. Both vessels were notified of the presence of SIEV-221 by customs officials around 5:45am and proceeded at full speed to intercept the boat.

Around 6:10am, the engine of SIEV-221 failed entirely and the crew were unable to re-start it. The vessel began to drift towards Rocky Point; an area where deep ocean swells strike against jagged cliffs and wash back out to sea, approximately 800 meters from where the vessel was first sighted. Christmas Island residents could hear passengers on SIEV-221 screaming and calling for help as waves pushed the boat closer to the rocks. Residents on the nearby clifftop captured amateur video footage of the entire incident.

Between 6:25am and 6:35am, the vessel was repeatedly struck against the rocks by heavy waves. The hull survived the first two impacts against the rocks but broke apart on the third impact. Passengers were thrown from the broken vessel and many who entered the water grabbed onto the flotsam and jetsam to stay afloat. The passengers and surrounding water were covered in diesel from the destroyed boat engine.

Around 60 residents of Christmas Island gathered at the top of nearby cliffs and threw life jackets and other objects into the water. Residents tried to haul victims out of the water using ropes tied to flotation devices. These rescue efforts were severely hampered by the sheer cliffs and poor weather conditions, with heavy winds blowing life jackets back against the cliff face. Only one man was able to scramble ashore.

Inflatable boats from HMAS Pirie and tenders from the ACV Triton arrived at Rocky Point around 7:00am. 41 passengers were rescued from the waters around the broken SIEV-221 by these vessels. Residents acted as spotters for the rescue boats, pointing out locations of survivors in the water. Many survivors were kept afloat by life jackets which had been thrown by residents from the clifftop.

Rescue boats pulled the final survivors from the water around 9:00am. No living passengers were found after that time, and the rescue effort was formally suspended on 18 December 2010.

== Aftermath ==
=== Survivors of SIEV-221 ===
50 passengers of SIEV-221 died as a result of the incident; 35 adults and 15 children. Only 30 bodies were recovered. The remaining missing were later declared deceased either due to drowning or injuries suffered as a result of the impact with the shore.

There were 42 survivors of the incident; 22 adult males, nine adult females, seven male minors, and four female minors. Of the survivors, 27 were from Iran, seven from Iraq, five were stateless, and three were from Indonesia. Three children were left orphaned.

After receiving medical treatment, most survivors were temporarily placed into mandatory immigration detention on Christmas Island. On 24 February 2011, the orphans and their families were released into community detention on the Australian mainland pending the assessment of their asylum claims. The remaining survivors were transferred into community detention on 6 March 2011.

The three Indonesian crew members who piloted SIEV-221 all survived and were convicted of people smuggling offenses in Australia. An Iranian-born Australian named Ali Heydarkhani was later extradited to Australia and separately sentenced to 14 years imprisonment for organising asylum seeker boats including SIEV-221.

In 2015, a group of survivors commenced a class-action lawsuit against the Australian government, alleging government officials were negligent in failing to respond to the disaster quickly enough. The case was dismissed by the Supreme Court of New South Wales, which found the government did not owe a duty of care to the passengers of SIEV-221 because it had no control over the boat and could not control the weather conditions.

=== Australian domestic response ===
Amateur video of the sinking of SIEV-221, captured by Christmas Island residents, was broadcast on the evening news in Australia on 10 December. The incident escalated domestic political debate in Australia regarding asylum seekers arriving by boat, and became a turning point in asylum seeker policy.

Opposition leader Tony Abbott called for the return of Howard government refugee policies. Prime Minister Julia Gillard publicly blamed people smugglers for the tragedy, and later cited the incident as one factor leading to the development of the Malaysian solution. Immigration Minister Chris Bowen said the incident "steeled the government's resolve to dissuade asylum seekers from getting on boats".

The Australian Parliament formed a bipartisan select committee to investigate the incident, which delivered its report in June 2011. The Committee praised the search and rescue effort by Christmas Island residents and customs personnel as brave and selfless. The Committee recommended ongoing support and counseling for residents and survivors of the disaster, and that a permanent memorial be established on the island.

The Coroner's Court of Western Australia (which has coronial jurisdiction over Christmas Island) conducted an inquest into the disaster in 2012. The Coroner praised the bravery of residents and rescue officers. However, he criticised the lack of available rescue vessels on Christmas Island and the insufficient visual and radar surveillance of incoming boats. He concluded the disaster was "generally foreseeable" and another tragedy may occur so long as asylum seeker boats continue to travel to Christmas Island.

=== Residents of Christmas Island ===
Many residents of Christmas Island involved in the rescue efforts reported feelings of extreme helplessness and post-traumatic stress as a result of what they had witnessed.

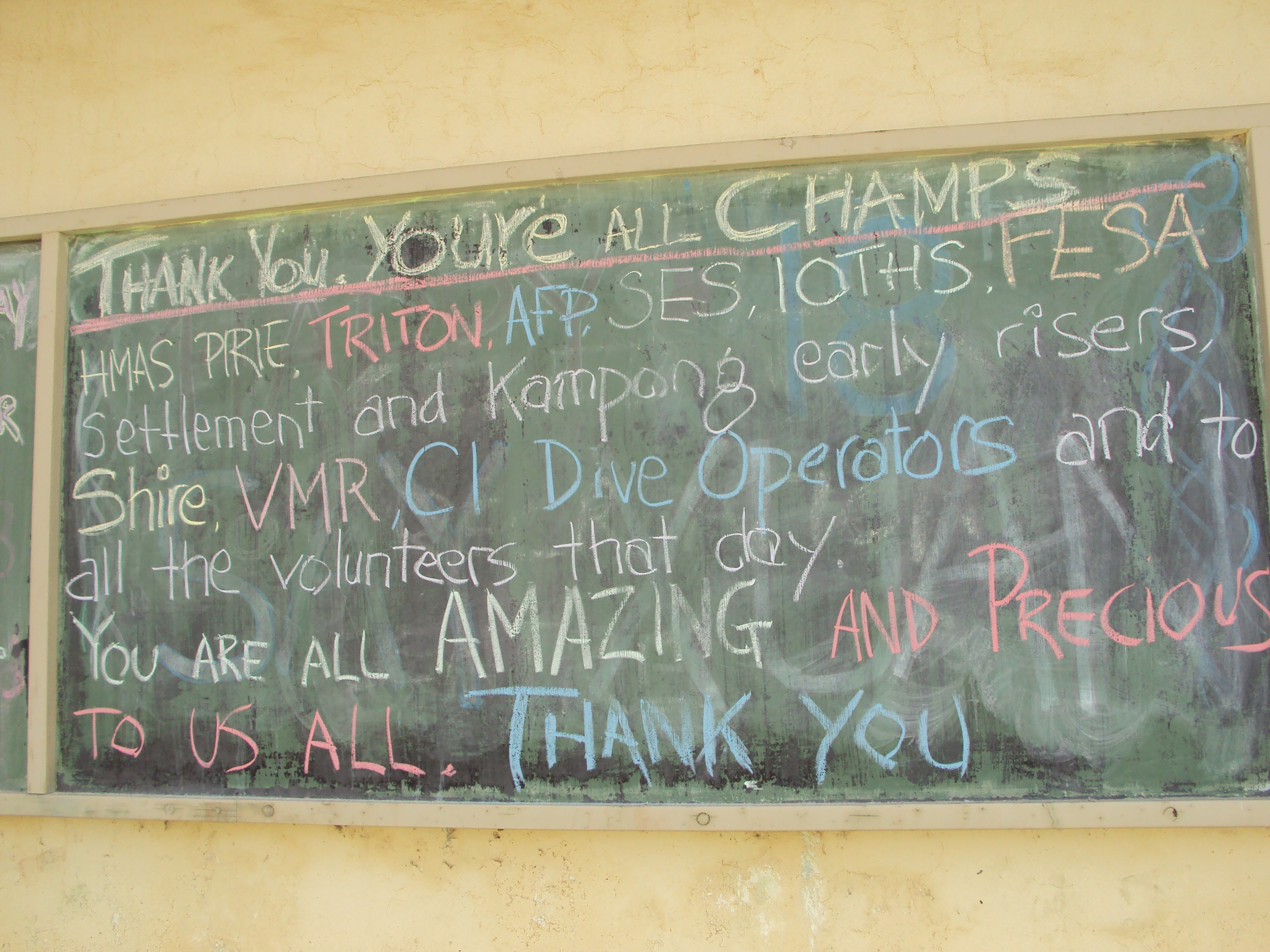
This message of thanks was written on the Island public space at the Roundabout four days after the disaster on 19 December 2010.

A public thanks was written on the Christmas Island Roundabout on 19 December 2010.

A public memorial for the victims of the disaster was erected at Smith Point, Christmas Island in 2011, and features the mounted damaged propeller of SIEV-221 and a memorial plaque.

== See also ==
- Human trafficking in Australia
- November 2009 Cocos (Keeling) Island migrant boat disaster
- SIEV X
