= Suspected Irregular Entry Vessel =

Australian military term

Suspected Irregular Entry Vessel (SIEV) was the operational term used by the Australian Defence Force and Australian Coastwatch for maritime vessels that appeared to be attempting to reach Australia clandestinely.

The legal context was of vessels that were entering Australian waters without authorisation. Previously the term 'Suspected Illegal Entry Vessel' was used. These boats are almost exclusively carrying asylum seekers who have departed from Indonesia on the final leg of a journey which started in countries such as Iraq, Afghanistan and Sri Lanka after paying "people smugglers". During Operation Relex, 12 SIEVs were intercepted. Four were forced back to Indonesia, and three sank.

SIEVs were given numerical designations. The vessel involved in the children overboard affair was the SIEV-4. The vessel that sank in 2001, killing 353 asylum seekers (mostly women and children) was designated by the press as SIEV X (a temporary operational term used by Coastwatch prior to designation, the SIEV-X often referred to in the press was reported not to have been detected prior to sinking).

== List of notable SIEVs ==
- SIEV-4 – the vessel involved in the children overboard affair, reached Christmas Island on 6 October 2001 with 223 passengers.
- SIEV-5 – reached Ashmore Reef on 12 October 2001 with 242 passengers.
- SIEV-6 – reached Christmas Island on 18 October 2001 with 227 passengers.
- SIEV-X – sank on 19 October 2001 with 421 passengers, killing 353. This boat was not an official SIEV, as it had not been detected by Australian authorities.
- SIEV-7 – reached Ashmore Reef on 22 October 2001 with 233 passengers.
- SIEV 36 – exploded and caught fire on 16 April 2009. The boat was carrying 47 passengers and two Indonesian crew. Three occupants were killed, and two more are missing. Five of the six navy personnel on board were injured.
- SIEV-221 – shipwrecked on cliffs at Christmas Island on 15 December 2010, 44 survivors from an estimated 90-100 passengers.

== Inquiries and inquests ==
The Siev X, Siev 36 and Siev 221 events were followed by a number of inquiries, articles and books; Siev 36 had a coronial inquest held in Darwin as the incident had occurred in the Commonwealth Territory of Ashmore and Cartier Islands over which the Northern Territory has coronial jurisdiction, and the Siev 221 coronial inquest was held in Perth due to Western Australia having coronial jurisdiction in the Commonwealth Territory of Christmas Island.

== See also ==
- Tampa affair
