= List of Australian immigration detention facilities =

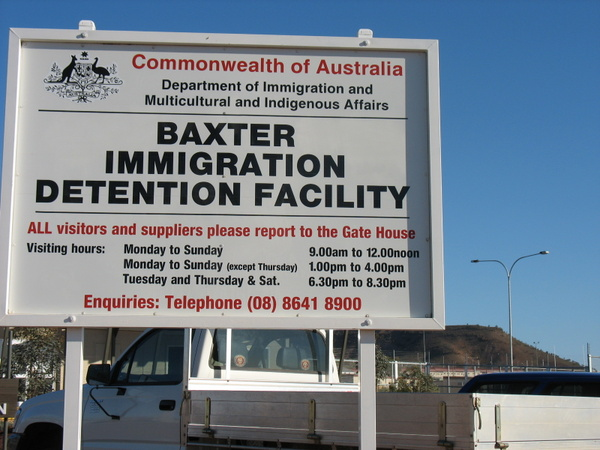
A sign at the entrance of the former Baxter Detention Cent, taken in 2006.

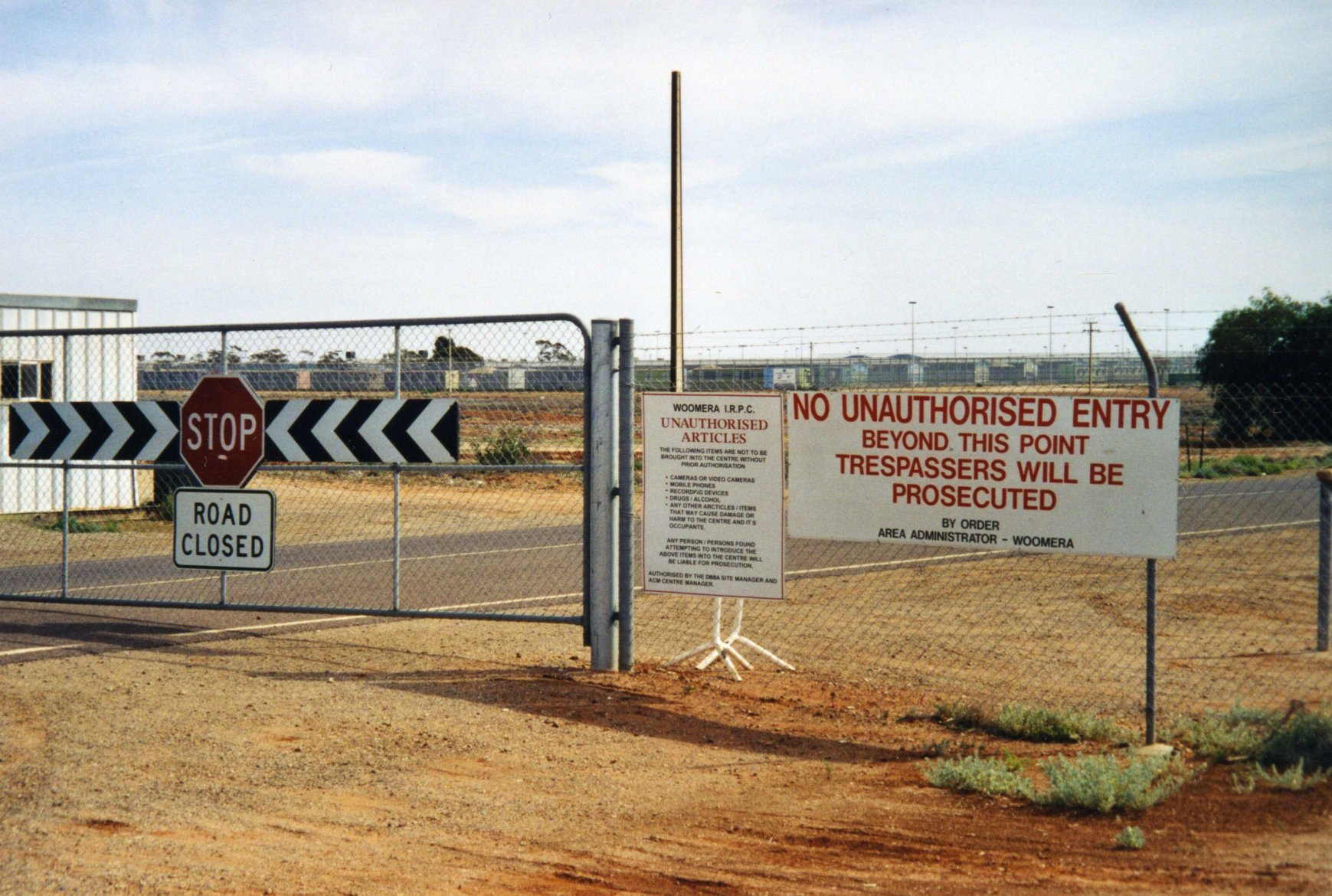
The entrance of the Woomera Immigration Reception and Processing Centre, taken in April 2003, following closure of the Centre.

This is a list of current and former Australian immigration detention facilities. Immigration detention facilities are used to house people in immigration detention, and people detained under the Pacific Solution, and Operation Sovereign Borders.

Most facilities were operated by Australasian Correctional Management (a subsidiary of G4S) under contract from the Department of Immigration until 2003, when ACM exited the market. Between 2003 and 2009, G4S was appointed as the contractor to manage a large number of facilities. Its contract was not renewed and in 2009 Serco Australia was awarded a five-year contract. The offshore processing centres on Nauru and Manus were operated by Broadspectrum (formerly known as Transfield Services), with security sub-contracted to Wilson Security, and later by Canstruct International. The new centres in Lorengau have security by Paladin Group.

Australian government immigration detention centres in Australia and offshore
Facility	Status	Classification	Managed	Opened	Closed	Capacity nominal; [surge]	Location
Baxter Immigration Reception and Processing Centre	Closed	Maximum	Australasian Correctional Management (G4S subsidiary)	September 2002	August 2007	660; [220]	Cultana, South Australia
Christmas Island Immigration Reception and Processing Centre	Operational	Maximum	G4Sserco and mss security sec s10, then Serco	2001–2008 (temporary), 2008–present		800; [688]	Christmas Island
Cocos Island Contingency Reception Centre	Closed	Maximum	Australasian Correctional Management (G4S subsidiary)serco and mss security	September 2001	March 2002		West Island, Cocos (Keeling) Islands
Curtin Immigration Reception and Processing Centre	Closed	Maximum	Serco subcontractors mss security	April 2010 (reopened)	September 2014	1,500	RAAF Curtin, Western Australia
Darwin Alternative Place of Detention	Opening	Medium	Department of Immigration and Border Protection			585	Darwin Airport, Northern Territory
Inverbrackie Alternative Place of Detention	Closed	Medium	Serco	18 December 2010	Mid 2014	400	Woodside, South Australia
Leonora Alternative Place of Detention	Closed	Medium	Serco	2010	2014	210	Leonora, Western Australia
Manus Regional Processing Centre	Closed	Maximum	G4S, then Broadspectrum with security subcontracted to Wilson Security	2001–2004, 2012– October 2017	31 October 2017	1100	Los Negros Island, Manus Province, Papua New Guinea
East Lorengau Refugee Transit Centre	Operational	Medium	Security and some services by Paladin Group	2017		213 or possibly 280	Lorengau, Manus Province, Papua New Guinea
West Lorengau Haus	Operational	Medium	Security and some services by Paladin Group	2018		111	Lorengau, Manus Province, Papua New Guinea
Hillside Haus	Operational	Medium	Security and some services by Paladin Group	2018		98	Lorengau, Manus Province, Papua New Guinea
Maribyrnong Immigration Detention Centre	Closed	Maximum	Global Solutions (former G4S subsidiary).	1983	2018	75; [5]	Maribyrnong, Victoria
Melbourne Immigration Transit Accommodation	Open	?	Serco	2008		396	Broadmeadows, Victoria
Nauru Regional Processing Centre	Operational	Maximum	Broadspectrum with security subcontracted to Wilson Security, and then later Canstruct (October 2017 – November 2018)	2001–2008, 2012–present		1,200	Nauru
Northern Immigration Detention Centre	Operational	Maximum	Department of Immigration and Border Protection	August 2001		382; [164]	Coonawarra, Northern Territory
Perth Immigration Detention Centre	Operational	Maximum	Department of Immigration and Border Protection	1981		55; [9]	Perth Airport, Western Australia
Pontville Immigration Detention Centre	Closed	Medium	Serco	August 2011	September 2013	400	Brighton Army Camp, Pontville, Tasmania
Port Augusta Immigration Residential Housing	Closed	Medium	Serco	2010	2014	64	Port Augusta, South Australia
Port Hedland Immigration Reception and Processing Centre	Closed	Maximum	Australasian Correctional Management (G4S subsidiary)	1991	April 2003	600	Port Hedland, Western Australia
Scherger Immigration Detention Centre	Closed	Maximum	Serco	2010	2014	596	RAAF Scherger, Queensland
Sydney Immigration Residential Housing	Operational	Medium	Serco	2006		48	Villawood, New South Wales
Villawood Immigration Detention Centre	Operational	Maximum	Serco	1981		510; [190]	Villawood, New South Wales
Wickham Point Immigration Detention Centre	Closed	Maximum	Department of Immigration and Border Protection	8 December 2011	July 2016	1,000	Wickham, Northern Territory
Woomera Immigration Reception and Processing Centre	Closed	Maximum	Australasian Correctional Management (G4S subsidiary)	November 1999	April 2003	1,500	Woomera, South Australia
Yongah Hill Immigration Detention Centre	Operational	Maximum	Serco	27 June 2012		600	Northam, Western Australia
