= Australian immigration detention facilities =

Facilities to detain unauthorised arrivals

Australian immigration detention facilities

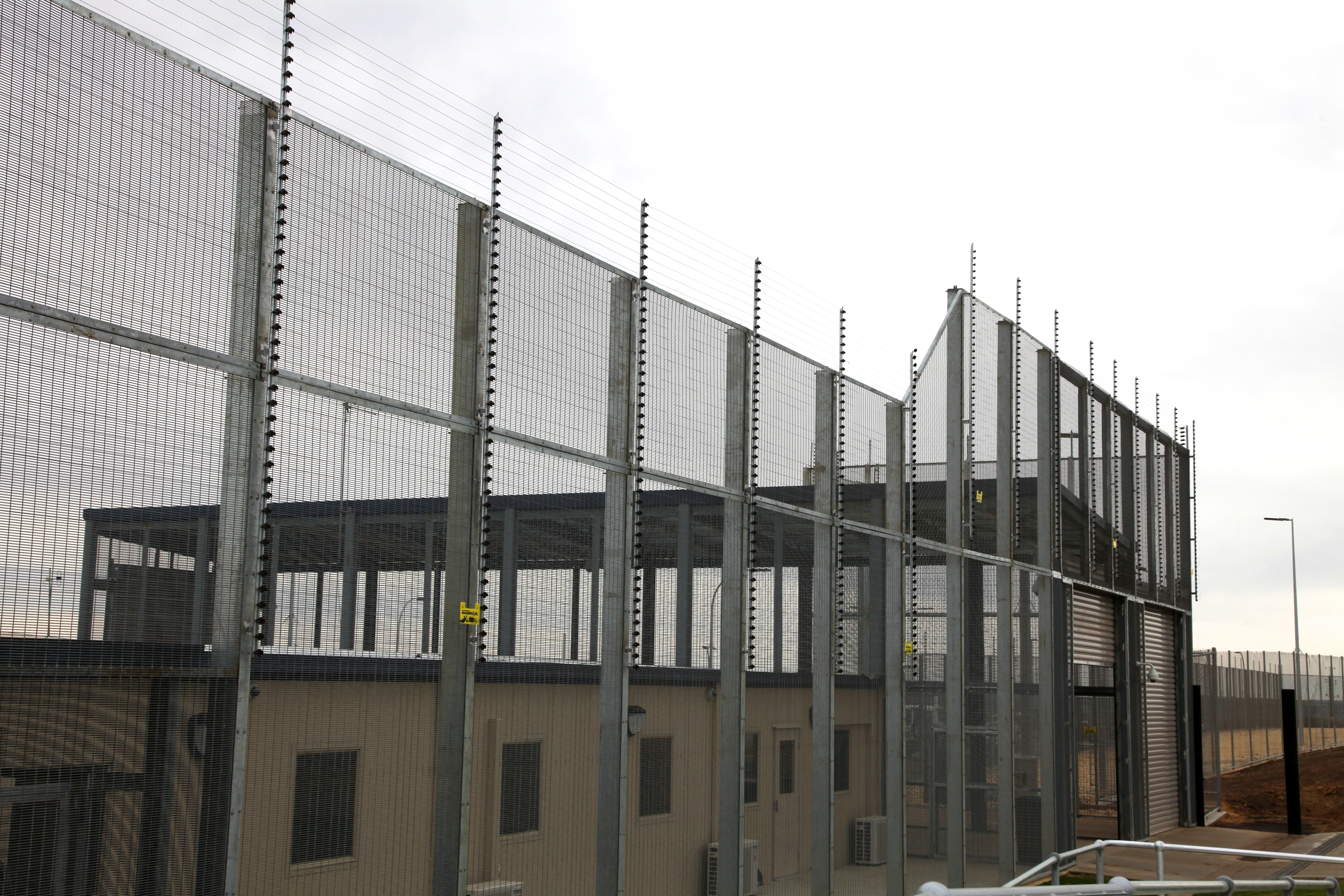
Barriers surrounding the Yongah Hill Immigration Detention Centre in Burlong, Western Australia.

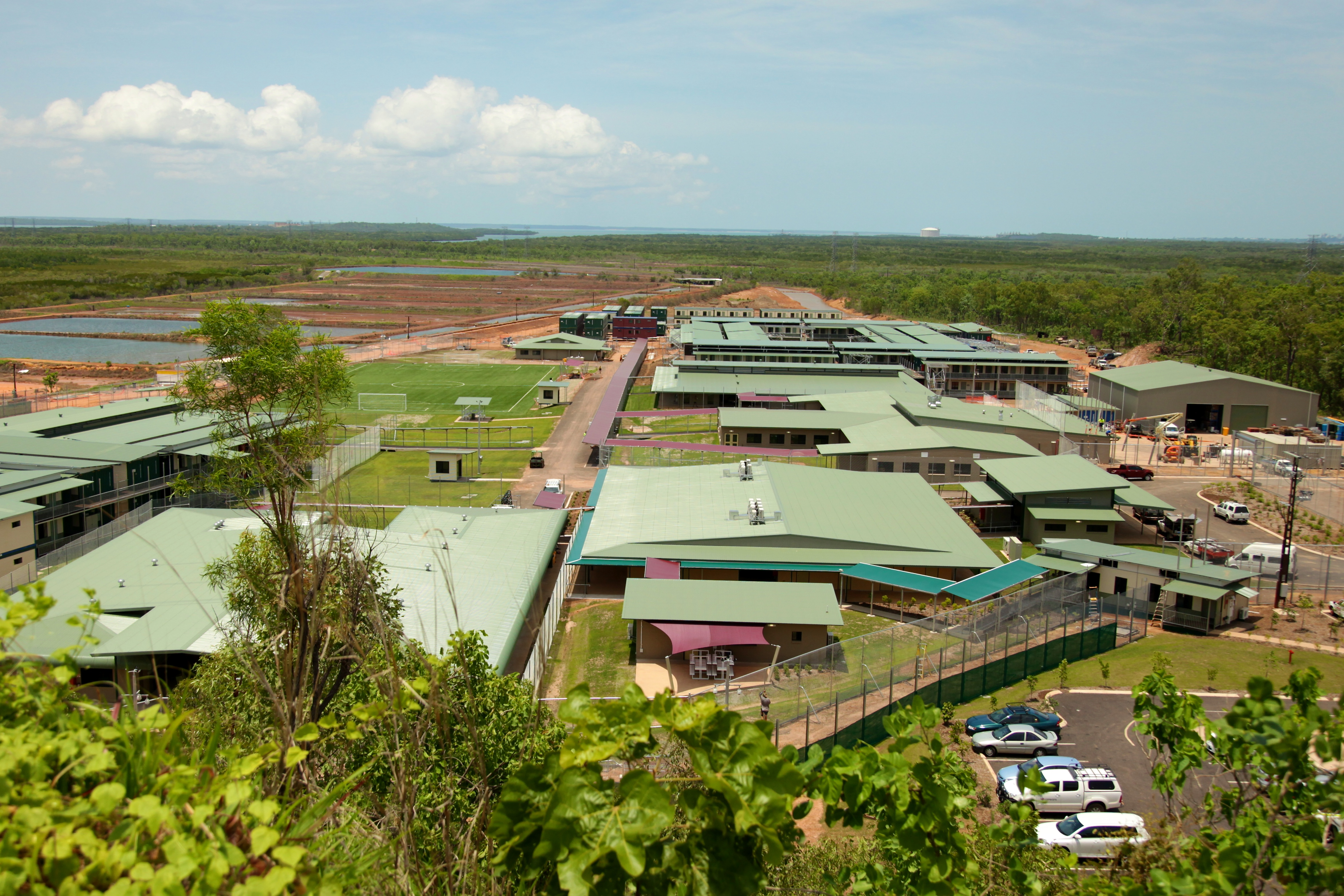
The Wickham Point Immigration Detention Centre in Darwin

Australian immigration detention facilities comprise a number of different facilities located throughout Australia, including on the Australian territory of Christmas Island. Such facilities also exist in Papua New Guinea and Nauru, namely the Nauru Regional Processing Centre and the Manus Regional Processing Centre.

The facilities are currently used to detain people who are under Australia's policy of mandatory immigration detention. Asylum seekers detected in boats in Australian waters have been detained in facilities on the offshore islands of Nauru and Manus Island, previously under the now-defunct Pacific Solution, and then (since 2013) under Operation Sovereign Borders.

The facilities' existence has been controversial, and they have been condemned on human rights grounds and even likened to concentration camps by some critics and human rights groups. The United Nations High Commissioner for Refugees (UNHCR) has cited these centres as a "damning indictment of a policy meant to avoid Australia's international obligations".

== Background ==
The Migration Act 1958 allowed discretionary detention of unauthorised arrivals until 1992. Since the 1990s when the Keating government created a policy of mandatory detention of unauthorised arrivals, with non-citizens arriving by boat without a valid visa being detained until they were either granted a visa, or deported.

Towards the end of the 1990s, a large increase in the number of unauthorised arrivals exceeded the capacity of the existing Immigration Reception and Processing Centres (IRPCs) at Port Hedland and Curtin.

== Facilities ==
=== Immigration Detention Centres (IDCs) ===
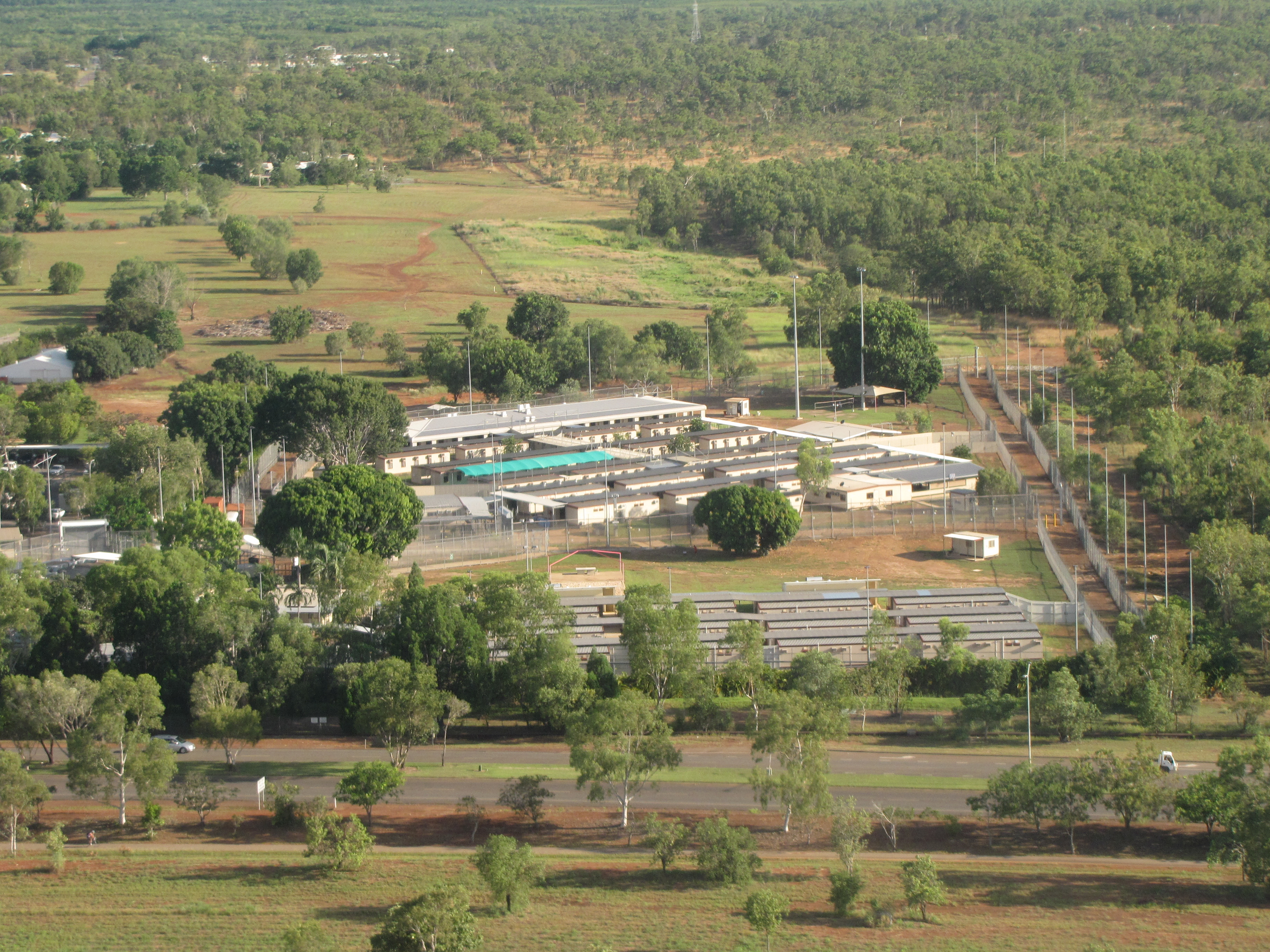
Northern IDC, Darwin, 2010

Immigration detention centres detain people who have overstayed their visa, breached their visa conditions and had their visa cancelled or have been refused entry at Australia's entry ports. This includes irregular maritime arrivals claiming asylum without passports, identity papers or valid entry visas. Under the Migration Act 1958, people arriving in this manner are classed as unlawful non-citizens and are currently subject to mandatory detention. However, in 1954 the Australian government ratified the United Nations Convention Relating to the Status of Refugees. Under Article 31 of the convention, the Australian government is legally obligated to grant anyone fleeing persecution and seeking asylum the right to enter the country by whatever means possible. Furthermore, the Article states that signatory countries are not to impose penalties on or indefinitely restrict the freedom of movement of those seeking asylum.

Australia's Migration Act 1958 requires people who are not Australian citizens and who are unlawfully in Australia to be detained. Unless they are given legal permission to remain in Australia by being granted a visa, unlawful non-citizens must be removed from Australia as soon as reasonably practicable. The Australian government claims that immigration detention is not used to punish people. Instead, they claim it is an administrative function whereby people who do not have a valid visa are detained while their claims to stay are considered or their removal is facilitated.

There are, or were, centres located at:

- Maribyrnong, established at Melbourne in 1966, closed in 2019.
- Villawood, established at Sydney in 1976.
- Perth, established in 1981.
- North West Point, Christmas Island, established 2001.
- Northern, established at Darwin in 2001, closed.
- Baxter, near Port Augusta, SA, established 2002, closed 2007.
- Brisbane, established in 2007 as Brisbane Immigration Transit Accommodation
- Melbourne, established in 2008 as Melbourne Immigration Transit Accommodation
- Wickham Point, established at Darwin in 2011, closed in 2016.
- Curtin, near Derby, WA, reopened in 2010, closed in 2014.
- Scherger, near Weipa, Queensland, opened 2010, closed 2014.
- Adelaide, established in 2011 as Adelaide Immigration Transit Accommodation
- Yongah Hill, near Northam, WA, established in 2012.

=== Immigration Residential Housing (IRH) ===
Immigration residential housing was a previously used form of immigration detention, which provided an option for accommodating people in independent family-style housing in a community setting while still formally being detained. This type of facility was one of several types of alternative residential accommodation for detained people, subject to them meeting eligibility criteria. They were previously located in:

- Perth
- Sydney
- Port Augusta

=== Immigration Transit Accommodation (ITA) ===
Immigration Transit Accommodation was a form of immigration detention used until July 2023. The Brisbane Immigration Transit Accommodation opened in November 2007 and the Melbourne Immigration Transit Accommodation opened in June 2008. Further immigration transit accommodation opened in Adelaide in 2011. ITCs were for short-term, low-risk detainees, however the Melbourne facility was extended with a high-security compound in 2018.

- Brisbane (now Brisbane Immigration Detention Centre)
- Melbourne (now Melbourne Immigration Detention Centre)
- Adelaide (now Melbourne Immigration Detention Centre)

=== Alternative Places of Detention (APOD) ===
Alternative Places of Detention (APOD) can accommodate any person who is in immigration detention. APOD may range from hospital accommodation in cases of necessary medical treatment, rented accommodation in the community (hotel rooms, apartments), or accommodation in the community made available through arrangements with other government departments. They may be located in all parts of Australia, including Christmas Island.

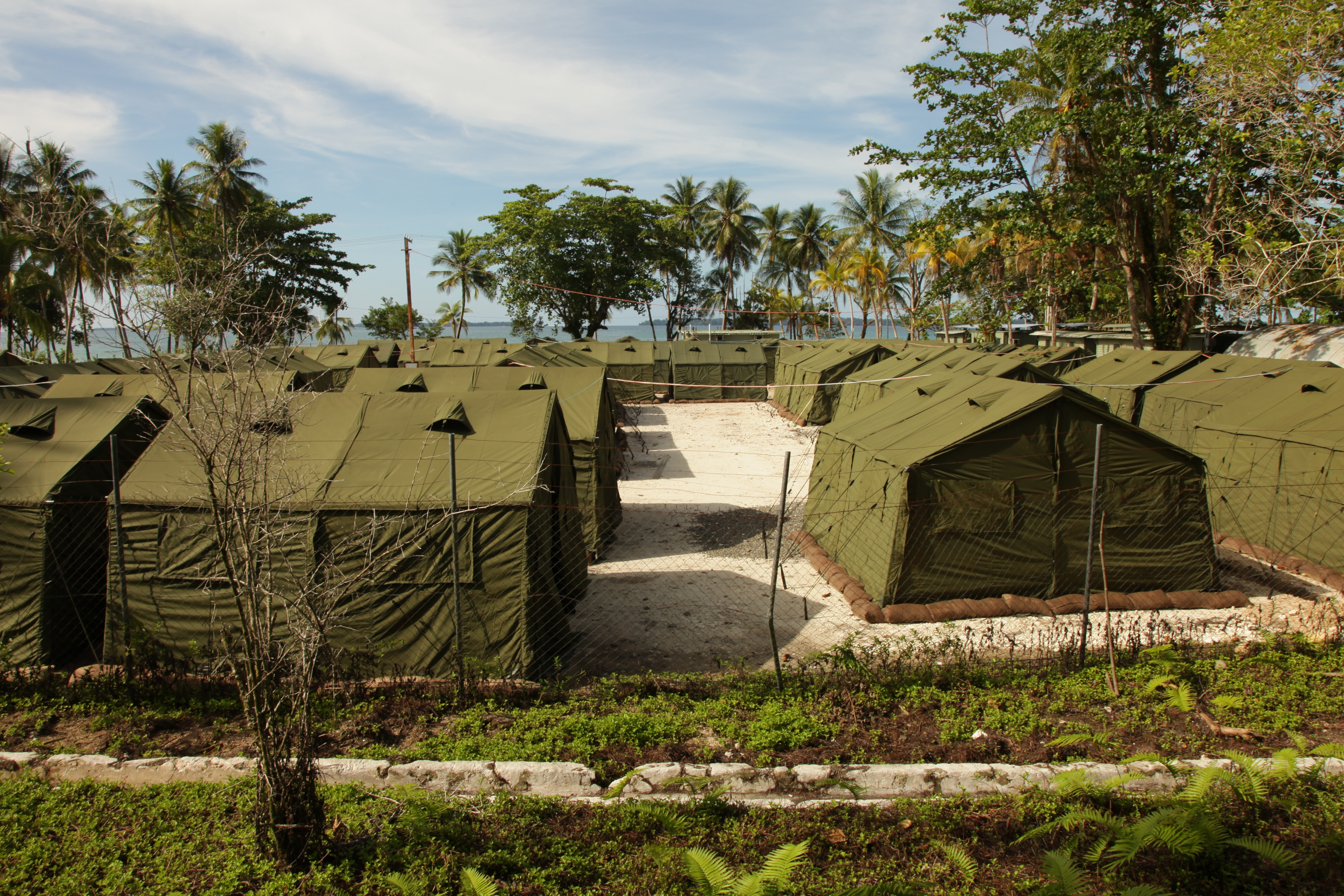
Manus Island regional processing facility (Image by DIAC)

=== Pacific Solution facilities ===
Since the implementation of the Pacific Solution Australia also funded immigration detention centres on:

- Manus Regional Processing Centre, Papua New Guinea closed in February 2008, re-opened on 22 November 2012 (re-closed on 23 November 2017).
- Nauru Regional Processing Centre closed in February 2008, re-opened in 2012.

=== Services to immigration centres ===
Most facilities were operated by Australasian Correctional Management (a subsidiary of G4S) under contract from the Department of Immigration until 2003, when ACM exited the market. Between 2003 and 2009, G4S was appointed as the contractor to manage a large number of facilities. Its contract was not renewed and in 2009 Serco Australia was awarded a five-year contract.

Manus Regional Processing Centre was operated by the International Organization for Migration, then by G4S, then by Broadspectrum (formerly Transfield) with security sub-contracted to Wilson Security.

Nauru Regional Processing Centre was operated by Broadspectrum and Wilson Security, and then later by Canstruct International (with a $591 million contract) and finally by a Nauruan Government Commercial Entity.

The 3 new immigration detention facilities in Lorengau on Manus Island have security and some services provided by Paladin Group under a contract worth more than $423 million.

Christmas Island Immigration Detention Centre was once operated by G4S but is now operated by Serco as of April 2019.

== Controversy ==
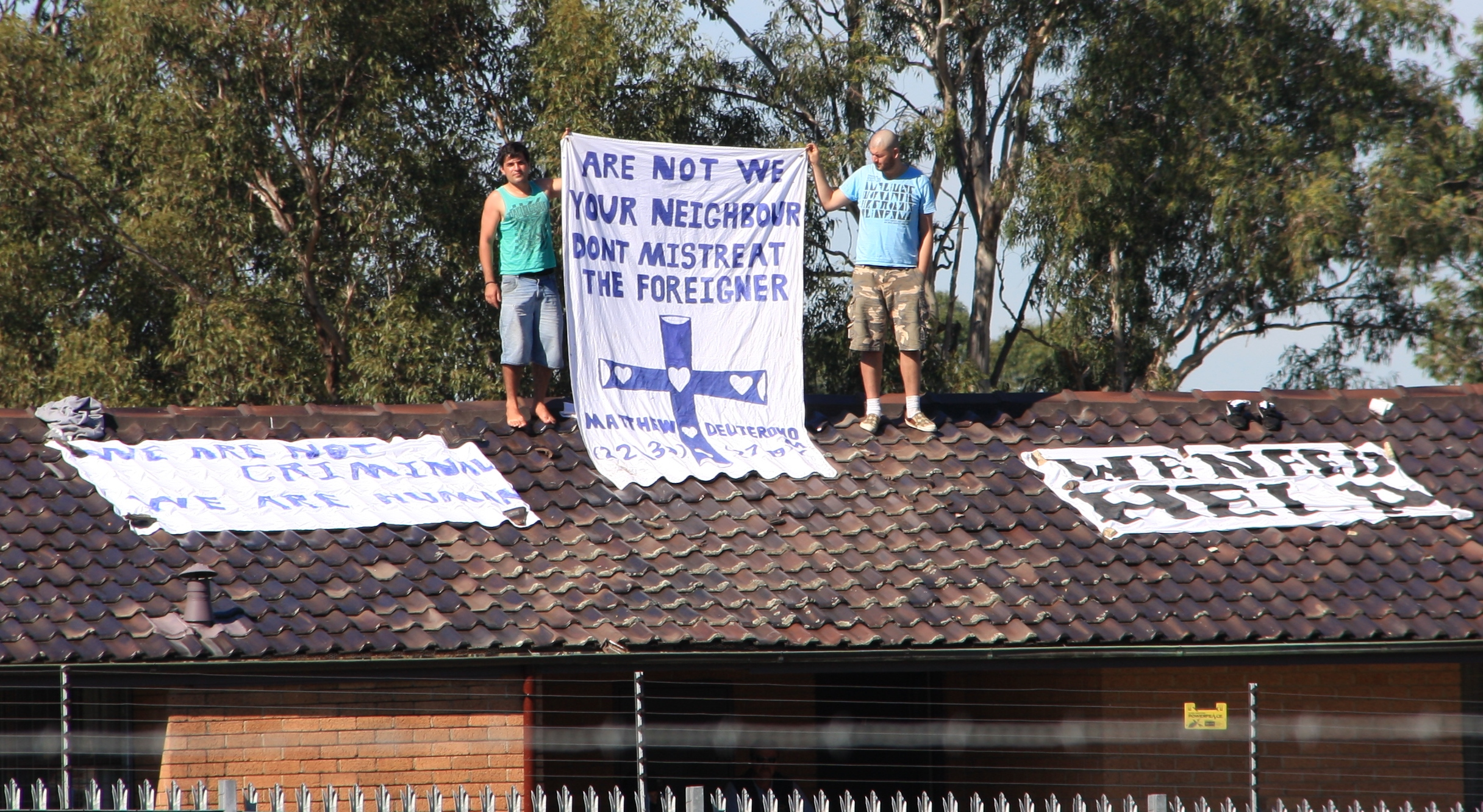
Detainees protesting on the roof of the Villawood Immigration Detention Centre in Sydney

The facilities have been a source of much controversy during their time of operation. There have been a number of riots and escapes, as well as accusations of human rights abuses from organisations such as refugee advocates, Amnesty International, the Australian Human Rights and Equal Opportunity Commission, Human Rights Watch, and the United Nations. Journalists are forbidden from entering the detention centres.

In January 2014, the Australian Labor Party and the Australian Greens accused the government of a cover-up over a violent clash on 18 October 2013 at the Manus Island facility between the Papua New Guinea army and the Papua New Guinea police mobile squad hired for the facility's security, leading to Australian expatriate staff being evacuated, while local staff and asylum seekers remained. On 5 May 2014, it was reported that several Salvation Army staffers had alleged that refugees were regularly subjected to beatings, racial slurs, and sexual assaults within the facility.

In March 2002, Irene Khan, the Secretary General of Amnesty International, said:

It is obvious that the prolonged periods of detention, characterised by frustration and insecurity, are doing further damage to individuals who have fled grave human rights abuses. The detention policy has failed as a deterrent and succeeded only as punishment.
How much longer will children and their families be punished for seeking safety from persecution?

=== Refugee "swap" with the United States ===
In 2016 the Australian government announced an intention to exchange some proven refugees from either Nauru and/or Manus Island for certain displaced people presently in Central America as part of an agreement with the Obama administration of the United States.

In early 2017, Prime Minister Malcolm Turnbull announced that he was confident the agreement would proceed, despite the change of President to Donald Trump. However, latest information appears to cast doubt on the willingness of the US government to honour any such agreement, especially in light of Trump's executive order suspending entry to the US from several countries.

On 2 February 2017, Australian news outlets, quoting the Washington Post, reported that a telephone conversation between Trump and Turnbull had been acrimonious in relation to the "swap", and that Trump had terminated the call ahead of time. Trump has expressed admiration over the detention facilities, opining that the US should do the same.

On 4 February 2019, the remaining 4 children who had been detained on Nauru were sent to the U.S.

In May 2019, it was revealed that some of the U.S. detainees sent to Australia in the "swap", were Rwandan men, former members of the Army for the Liberation of Rwanda, who had been accused of mass-murdering tourists in 1999. They had been held in U.S. immigration detention for over 15 years, but were on the verge of being released into the U.S. after a court ruled that their confessions had been obtained by torture. In November 2018 the men were secretly brought to Australia. The Turnbull government knew about the allegations against the men when they agreed to accept them. The Australian and U.S. Governments initially refused to comment on the matter, but later Prime Minister Scott Morrison said that the men had been assessed by security agencies.

The former New Zealand foreign affairs minister Gerry Brownlee described Australia's behaviour as "incredibly insensitive" and said that New Zealand would have "appreciated a heads up" that Australia was about to resettle men accused of brutally murdering two New Zealanders [among others].

=== Suicide and self-harm attempts increase on Manus ===
After the Liberal–National Coalition was re-elected in the 2019 Australian federal election, reports of despair and attempted self-harm and suicide were reported on Manus. The men had hoped with Labor in government, the New Zealand offer would be accepted and they would at last be resettled. By 4 June there had been at least 26 attempts at suicide or self-harm by men in the Lorengau camps and Port Moresby (in the hospital and accommodation for sick asylum seekers). The PNG paramilitary police squad was deployed around one of the camps in an attempt to deter suicide and self-harm attempts. Lorengau general hospital has been handling many of the self-harm and suicide cases, despite the Australian government contract with Pacific International Health (PIH), because of the seriousness of the cases. The police commander commented that they were doing all they could, but severe mental illness arose because of the effect of long-term detention on the men.

== See also ==
- Australia–Nauru relations
- Human rights in Australia
- International Health and Medical Services
