= International Health and Medical Services =

- Company type: Privately held company
- Industry: Medical services
- Predecessor: Sydney International Medical Clinic Pty Ltd
- Founded: 30 March 2000; 24 years ago in Sydney, Australia
- Headquarters: Sydney
- Products: Medical services and health care in immigration detention
- Parent: International SOS
- Website: www.ihms.com.au

International Health and Medical Services (IHMS) provides primary and mental health care services within the Australian immigration detention network under a contract with the Department of Immigration and Border Protection. It is a subsidiary of International SOS.

IHMS traded as International Health And Medical Services Pty Ltd from 24 November 2003 and was initially registered as Sydney International Medical Clinic Pty Ltd in 30 March 2000.

== Locations ==
- North West Point Immigration Detention Centre, Christmas Island
- Yongah Hill Immigration Detention Centre
- Perth Immigration Detention Centre
- Maribyrnong Immigration Detention Centre
- Villawood Immigration Detention Centre

Outside Australian territory

- Manus Regional Processing Centre
- Nauru Regional Processing Centre

Transit accommodation

- Adelaide Immigration Transit Accommodation
- Brisbane Immigration Transit Accommodation
- Melbourne Immigration Transit Accommodation

== Standard of care ==
Concerns have been documented about the standard of care provided. Poor coordination between the Government of Australia and IHMS have been noted to contribute to poor outcomes for people in detention.

There have been questions about deaths in detention related to medical care, particularly:

- Hamid Kehazaei
- Faysal Ishak Ahmed
