= Australasian Correctional Management =

Former Australian subsidiary of Wackenhut

Australasian Correctional Management (ACM) was a private Australian company that existed from 1991 to 2003 and was owned by American company Wackenhut.

== History ==
From 1998 until 2003 ACM was responsible for running at least six immigration detention centres in Australia. ACM also ran the Auckland Central Remand Prison (ACRP) in New Zealand from its opening in July 2000 until control reverted to the Public Prisons Service in July 2005 due to the passing of the Corrections Bill 2005.

ACM attracted strong criticism from the Australian left for alleged abuses of asylum seekers detained in its facilities. This climaxed with a protest in Easter 2002 at the Woomera Immigration Reception and Processing Centre. This became part of the inspiration for the video game Escape From Woomera.

In 2002 Wackenhut was taken over by Group 4 Falck.

ACM handed over the running of these centres to its parent company Group 4 Falck (now part of G4S) in 2003. It also changed the name of its New Zealand wing to Global Expertise in Outsourcing NZ ltd (GEO) while it was still running ACRP.

== Detention centres formerly run by ACM ==
- Baxter Immigrant Reception and Processing Centre
- Fulham Correctional Centre
- Maribyrnong Immigration Detention Centre
- Perth Immigration Detention Centre
- Port Hedland Immigration Detention Centre
- Villawood Immigration Detention Centre
- Woomera Immigration Reception and Processing Centre
