= Curtin Immigration Reception and Processing Centre =

Immigration detention facility in Western Australia

Coordinates: 17°36′18″S 123°49′15″E

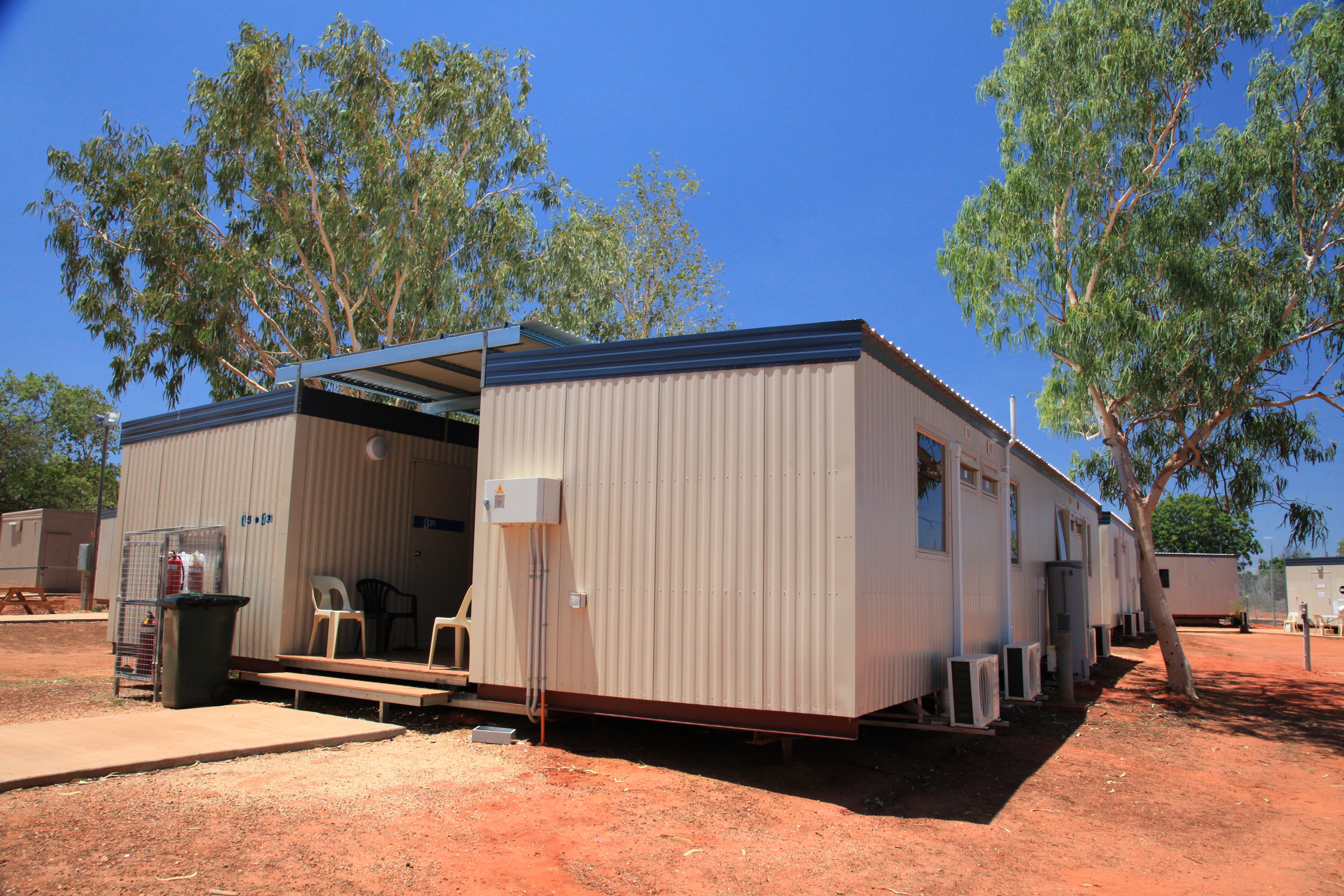
Part of the centre

Curtin Immigration Detention Centre is an Australian immigration detention facility at the RAAF Base Curtin in the Kimberley region of Western Australia. Curtin was described by former immigration minister Philip Ruddock as the country's "most primitive" processing centre. It was shut down by the Howard government following a riot in 2002 but was re-opened in 2010 by its successor – the Rudd–Gillard government. The controversial move has been seen by commentators as a reversal by the Australian Labor Party of its policy towards detention.

It is run by Serco Asia Pacific, who also run Villawood and other detention centres in Australia.

== Notable detainees ==
- Munjed Al Muderis, Iraqi asylum seeker and pioneering Osteointegration surgeon, and human rights activist
- Abdul Hekmat, Hazara refugee and journalist contributing to The Monthly magazine, The Saturday Paper and The Guardian, and other publications

== See also ==
- List of Australian immigration detention facilities
