= Perth Prison =

Perth Prison may refer to:

- HM Prison Perth, Scotland
- Perth Gaol, or Old Perth Gaol, Australia

== See also ==
- Perth Immigration Detention Centre, Australia
