= IHMS =

IMHS may refer to:

- International Health and Medical Services
- Immaculate Heart of Mary Seminary (Philippines)
