= Woomera Immigration Reception and Processing Centre =

Immigration detention facility in South Australia

Coordinates: 31°11′7″S 136°48′27″E

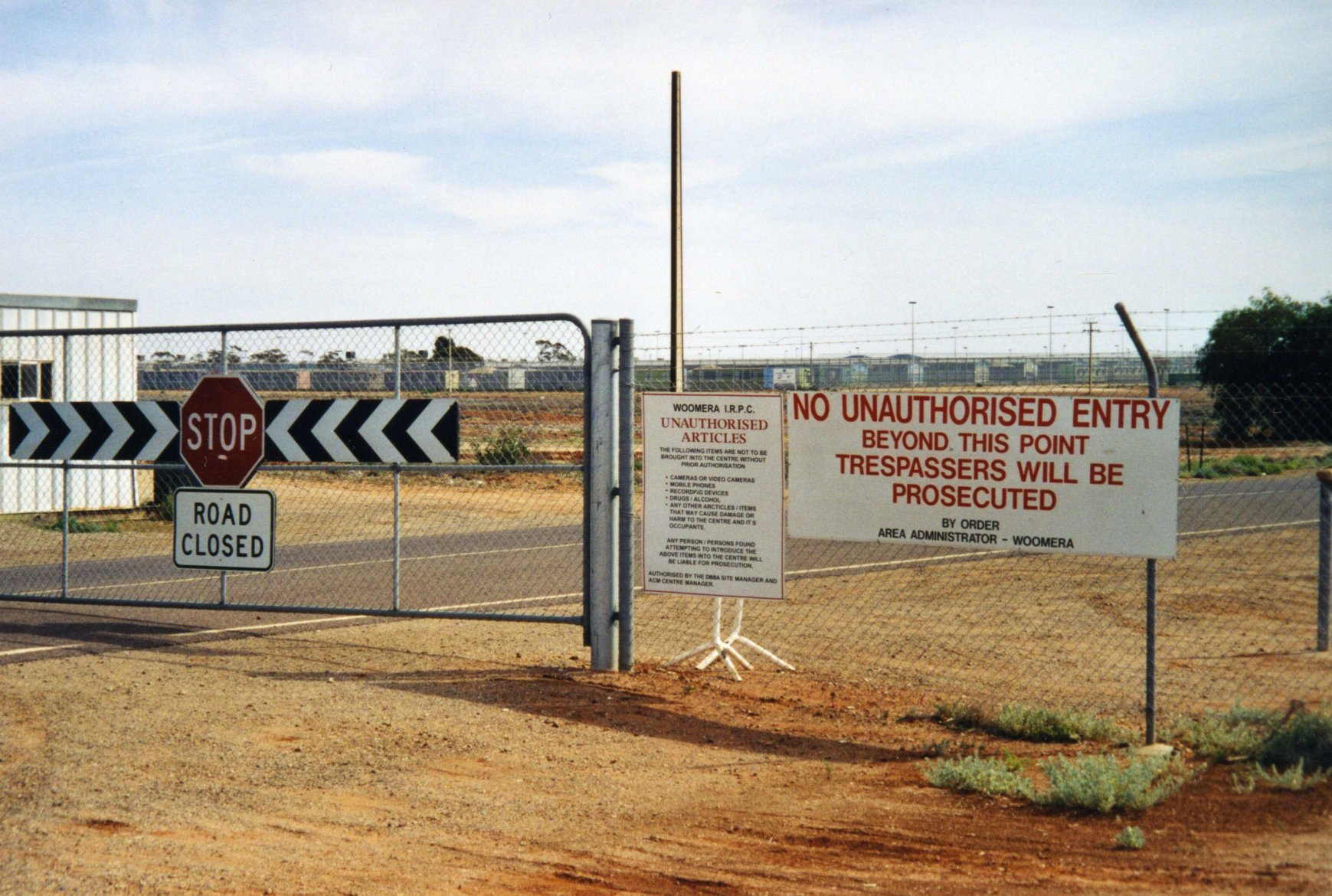
The entrance of the Woomera IRPC

The Woomera Immigration Reception and Processing Centre (IRPC) was an Australian immigration detention facility near the village of Woomera in South Australia. It was opened in November 1999 in response to an increase in unauthorised arrivals, which had exceeded the capacity of other detention facilities. It was originally intended to hold 400 people, however at its peak in April 2000 it had nearly 1,500 detainees. After ongoing public pressure in response to several well publicised riots from 2000, accusations of human rights abuses, and capacity issues, the centre closed in April 2003.

The site was rebuilt during 2003, and then handed back to the Australian Department of Defence. The facility was renamed "Camp Rapier" in 2004 and has only supported Defence activities on the Woomera Test Range since that time.

For much of its time in operation, the facility was an immigration detention centre, it was run by Australasian Correctional Management (ACM), a subsidiary of Wackenhut Security Corporation, under a contract with the Department of Immigration and Multicultural and Indigenous Affairs. ACM was criticised over various practices, including failing to staff the Centre adequately, and concealing evidence of child abuse.

== Background to the creation of the facility ==
During the early 1990s the Keating government enforced a policy of mandatory detention of unauthorised arrivals. All non-citizens arriving by boat without a valid visa were detained until they were either granted a visa, or deported.

Towards the end of the 1990s, a large increase in the number of unauthorised arrivals exceeded the capacity of the existing Immigration Reception and Processing Centres at Port Hedland and Curtin. The former, and at that time unused, 'Woomera West Construction Camp' was converted into an immigration detention facility in 1999, and the Woomera IRPC was opened to accommodate this increase.

== Operation of the Woomera facility ==
The centre was opened in November 1999, with a capacity of 400. This capacity was very quickly exceeded, as the boat arrivals continued. Nursing and administrative staff working there at the time complained that facilities were totally inadequate, and that it was impossible to provide proper medical care. Management of the centre has been criticised for not providing adequate training to staff for confrontations. This resulted in psychological problems for staff including post-traumatic stress, marriage breakdowns, and in some cases, suicide attempts.

Most detainees applied for refugee status, and had no possibility for release until their claim had been finalised. Men, women, and children were detained at the centre. The highest number of children detained at any one time was 456, out of a total population of 1442, on 1 September 2001. As at 26 December 2003, the average length of detention for children was one year, 8 months, and 11 days. An unaccompanied child refugee had this to say:

I believe you [Australians] are nice people, peace seekers, you support unity. If you come to see us behind the fence, think about how you would feel. Are you aware of what happens here? Come and see our life. I wonder whether if the Government of Iran created camp like Woomera and Australians had seen pictures of it, if they would have given people a visa to come to Australia then.

In June 2000, there were two days of protests. Approximately 480 detainees broke out and walked into the township. In August 2000 there were three days of riots and fires; 60–80 detainees were involved, and tear gas and water cannons were used. 32 staff were injured during this riot. In November 2000, there was a hunger strike involving more than 30 detainees, some of whom were force fed in hospital. Throughout 2001, there were repeated riots and confrontations between ACM guards and detainees, with water cannons and tear gas often used as deterrents.

During 2002 there were a number of riots, hunger strikes, and lip-sewing, which included children. In January 2002, over 200 detainees started a hunger strike, while some threatened suicide in violent ways, some consuming poisons such as shampoos. Refugee advocates (such as the Woomera Lawyers Group and RASSA) argued that this showed the desperation of detainees. The refugees complained that conditions were harsh, that it took up to three years for their claims to be processed, and that processing their claims had been suspended.

There had been similar protests before, but the 2002 protests were taken up by the national and international media and by national and international organisations. The United Nations High Commissioner for Refugees felt Australia should reconsider its policy. Mary Robinson the United Nations High Commissioner for Human Rights was first denied access to the Woomera IRPC but later the Australian Government yielded to pressure.

== Breakout ==
Over the Easter holiday of 2002, about 1000 protesters gathered at the gates of Woomera to voice their opposition to the mandatory detention of refugees. About 40 refugees escaped from the centre during this protest. Most were captured over the coming hours and subsequently deported, but some made it out of the desert, though some were reported to the police and later deported, and at least one was granted a temporary protection visa.

== Approved for visas ==
80% of those detained over the years have been found to be genuine refugees, the majority being issued with a temporary protection visa.

== Closure ==
The centre was closed in April 2003, and all remaining detainees were transferred to Baxter Immigration Reception and Processing Centre. With the hand back of the Woomera facilities to Defence as part of the wider upgrade of the Woomera Test Range, Woomera will not be used again as any form of IRPC as the facility is now part of the Test Range itself.

== Further controversy ==
The detention centre was a source of much controversy during its time of operation. There were a number of riots and escapes, as well as accusations of human rights abuses from groups as diverse as refugee advocates, Amnesty International, the Australian Human Rights and Equal Opportunity Commission, ChilOut, Human Rights Watch, and the United Nations, although no charges have ever been laid against any person against such public accusations.

In March 2002, the Secretary General of Amnesty International, Irene Khan, said:

It is obvious that the prolonged periods of detention, characterised by frustration and insecurity, are doing further damage to individuals who have fled grave human rights abuses. The detention policy has failed as a deterrent and succeeded only as punishment. How much longer will children and their families be punished for seeking safety from persecution?

Throughout the controversy, then-Prime Minister John Howard and successive immigration ministers maintained that their actions at Woomera were justified in the interests of protecting Australia's borders and ensuring that immigration law was enforced. A 2004 Liberal Party election policy document stated:

The Coalition Government's tough stance on people smuggling stems from the core belief that Australia has the right to decide who comes to this country and the circumstances in which they come. Deterrence has been achieved through excision, boat returns, offshore processing and mandatory detention.

== In popular culture ==
The centre is the subject of a video game, Escape From Woomera, an unfinished point-and-click adventure video game, intended to criticise the treatment of mandatorily detained asylum seekers in Australia, as well as the Australian government's attempt to impose a media blackout on the detention centres.

It is also the subject of a play, Woomera, which tells the story of Justin, a young prison guard recently arrived at the detention centre.

== See also ==
- List of Australian immigration detention facilities
