= Baxter protests =

Immigration centre protests in South Australia

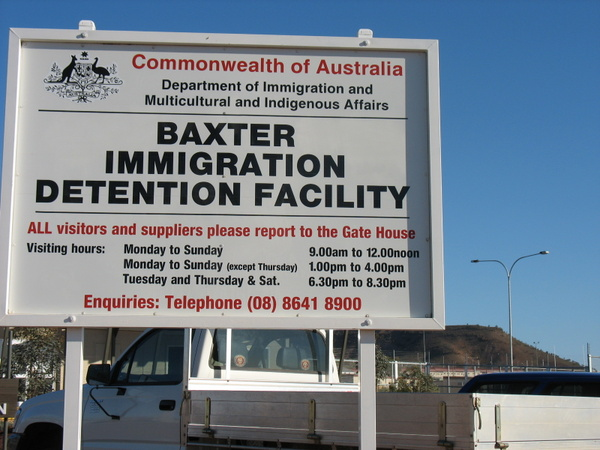
- Signage at the Baxter Immigration Reception and Processing Centre
- Date: Easter weekends, 2003 & 2005
- Location: near Port Augusta, South Australia
- Goals: End mandatory detention of asylum seekings
- Methods: Protest march, kite & balloon flying

During the Easter weekends of 2003 and 2005 in Australia, several hundred protesters went to the Baxter Immigration Reception and Processing Centre, located near Port Augusta to protest against the Howard Government's treatment of asylum seekers.

The protests were in the tradition of the 'great protest march'. Protesters arrived at Port Augusta from all over Australia. In many cases the protesters would have travelled for two to four days to make the trip and would travel another two to four days in return. The protest would last the long weekend of Easter in a camp near the detention centre.

In both years, there was a significant amount of news media coverage of the event. There remained considerable complaints from both sides. The protesters alleged that the police had been heavy-handed. The police alleged that the protesters were actively attempting to turn a peaceful protest into a violent protest by continued breaches of the law.

== The 2003 protest ==
The 2003 protests saw around 500 people camp out at Baxter. A roadblock was set up more than two kilometres from the centre. The campsite was located about four kilometres to the west of the centre. 33 people were arrested over three days of protest. Some of the protestors had brought split tennis balls with messages of support inserted which were to be thrown over the security fences.

== The 2005 protest ==
The 2005 protests saw around 500 people camp out at Baxter. On 26 March protestors pushed down a fence. On 27 March, four protestors who used a grappling hook and metal chain to gain entry to the centre over a fence were arrested.

In 2005, the people who were arrested for throwing a grappling hook onto the electric fence did not gain entry to the centre. In fact they did not even attempt this. They merely did some trivial damage to the fence and waited passively to be arrested. This was their intent, to challenge the legitimacy of the fence and then surrender to the legal consequences of this.

== Outcome of the protests ==
There has not been significant debate about how influential the protests were. Partly because the issue of refugees and mandatory detention had been well established as political issues long before the protests started.

=== The kite flyers ===
During both protests, several kites were confiscated and the kite flyers were prosecuted with minor and obscure offences against air traffic regulations. The air space around the immigration centre is restricted.

The offences were considered to have been incapable of prosecution. There also remained serious lingering concerns about the Constitutional validity of such prosecutions. In both cases, the Baxter protesters' lawyers were successful in having the charges withdrawn.

In 2005, the police also raided the main camp at about 6 am confiscating kites from several people in preemption of these laws being broken.

As well as kite flying being treated as an offence by police, helium balloon flying was treated in a similar way with police arresting protesters for possession of large bundles of helium balloons after popping them on the approach to the camp.

=== Other criminal consequences ===
On the whole the protests were peaceful. However at each protest around 20 to 30 protesters were arrested and prosecuted with mostly minor offences, such as property offences, trespass and decency offences. In the 2003 protests around 80% of the charges were withdrawn, leaving approximately three convictions and no substantial penalties. In the 2005 protests only 50% of the charges were withdrawn. This was due to the higher number of trespassing offences, which were on the whole incapable of defending.

=== Public opinion ===
Public opinion on the protests was divided, not only between those who supported the refugee cause and those who did not, but also among pro-refugee groups. Some people saw the protests as providing no real assistance to the plight of refugees. These groups pointed to the fact that often the protests would create disturbances in the Baxter facility which would cause harm to the refugees. Others considered it a significant and important protest march in the interest of aiding in shifting public opinion against Australia's immigration policy.

== See also ==
- Immigration in Australia
