= Maygar Barracks =

Australian military training area

Coordinates: 37°41′03″S 144°56′38″E

Maygar Army Barracks is located in Broadmeadows, Victoria. It was the training area for the Australian Light Horse during World War I. The barracks was named after Victoria Cross winner Leslie Maygar, who received the award for his actions during the Second Boer War 1901 and later assisted in establishing the base in 1914. He was subsequently killed during the Battle of Beersheba in 1917.

The Melbourne Immigration Transit Accommodation facility was built on part of the site in 2008 using the former officer's mess.
