= Paladin Group (security company) =

Southeast Asian military contractor

- Type: Multinational
- Industry: Private security, other services
- Predecessors: Black Swan
- Founded: 2010, Australia
- Headquarters: Canberra, ACT, Australia
- Areas served: South East Asia, Oceania, Australia
- Key people: Craig Thrupp, David Saul
- Owner: Craig Thrupp
- Number of employees: 4,500 (2019)
- Subsidiaries: Electrical Construction and Management (PNG), Black Swan (PNG), Greater Monaro Electrical Construction and Management (Australia), Rentlo Car Hire (Timor Leste), Sentinel (Timor Leste)
- Website: paladingroup.com.au

Paladin Group, also known as Paladin Solutions, Paladin Holdings and Paladin Solutions Group, is a security and project services contractor which operates in South East Asia, Australia and Oceania.

The company was founded by Craig Thrupp, a former member of the Australian Defence Force. The directors of the company are Thrupp, David Saul and Dermot Casey.

== Operations ==
=== Australian Government contract for services on Manus Island ===
In September 2017, Paladin holdings was awarded an AUD contract to provide security, IT, local transport and some site management for three Australian immigration detention centers located in the town of Lorengau on Manus Island, Manus Province, Papua New Guinea. These centres are West Lorengau Haus, East Lorengau Refugee Transit Center, and Hillside Haus. The contract was reported as being worth $423 million.

In June 2019, after the contract had been renewed several times, the Australian Minister for Home Affairs, Peter Dutton, said that Paladin's contract would probably be extended once again. However, a few days later the Papua New Guinean government indicated that they would cancel or terminate the contract. The PNG Immigration Minister Petrus Thomas said the PNG Government wanted a transparent tender process, and that "Papua New Guinean companies now have the capacity and expertise to do the job and should be given the opportunity to participate."

On 26 June 2019 the Australian Department of Home Affairs and the PNG Immigration and Citizenship Authority issued a statement confirming a limited extension of Paladin's contract after which the PNG government would administer a tender process for a local party to take over the contract. In July 2019 media reports referred to an email from Paladin Managing Director David Saul that confirmed the contract had been extended for six months in a decision that "recognises the professionalism of Paladin.

Paladin's contract for Manus Island ended on 30 November 2019, they aimed for an orderly transition to a PNG company to provide care and maintenance at the ELRTC facility.

In total, Paladin received $532 million from the Australian Government for garrison services on Manus Island from September 2017 to November 2019.

=== Other operations ===
In April 2019, the company's website stated they employed 4,500 local nationals across the Asia-Pacific, including in Papua New Guinea, Timor-Leste and Singapore.

In June 2019 Paladin announced that its strategy of nationalising its PNG workforce had reached the milestone of 98 per cent local staff after its expatriate staff numbers had been halved in two years with more nationals stepping into senior managerial and technical roles. Paladin also increased the shareholding of Peren, the local landowning group, to make it a fifty-fifty partnership as per the terms of an MoU that was signed in 2014.

Prior to being awarded the large contract, Paladin's work included being a subcontractor providing security at East Lorengau Refugee Transit Centre on Manus Island, which housed 60 people. Their contract was worth about $15 million a year as estimated by competitors, though currently unverified.

=== Charity ===
In July 2019 Paladin sponsored an initiative by Australia-based not-for-profit Screens Without Borders to bring cinema back to Manus Island after forty years. A series of film screenings were held in remote communities across the island.

== Subsidiaries ==
Paladin's website states that they are Australian-owned. In April 2019, the website listed the following subsidiaries in various countries:

Australia:

- Paladin Group Aus Pty Ltd - offices in Canberra, Australian Capital Territory
- Greater Monaro Electrical Construction and Management (ECM Monaro) - Cooma, New South Wales

Papua New Guinea:

- Paladin Group
- Black Swan International - former competitors of Paladin in PNG private security sector, who were taken over in 2019.
- Electrical Construction and Management (ECM).

Singapore:

- Paladin Holdings Pte Ltd - a holding company whose registered offices are on Battery Rd.

Timor Leste:

- Paladin Group (Timor-Leste subsidiary)
- Sentinel
- Rentlo Car Hire - a car hire company based in Dili.

Paladin also had a holding company registered in Hong Kong since 2013.

== Key people ==
=== Craig Thrupp ===
Craig Ross Thrupp was born in Canberra, Australian Capital Territory. He formerly served in the Australian Defence Force. In May 2000, at the age of 19, he gave an interview for the UNSW Australians at War Film Archive describing his experiences in the ADF.

=== David Saul ===
David Saul was appointed CEO of Paladin in November 2018 and joined its board as managing director in May 2019. He retired from the Australian Defence Force as a Brigadier and went on to work for the major Australian logistics firm Qube Holdings.

=== Dermot Casey ===
Dermot Casey joined Paladin's board of directors in May 2019. He retired from the Australian public service in 2013 with roles in the Department of Health and the Department of Immigration and Citizenship. He was awarded the Public Service Medal during the Australia Day honours in January 2008.

== Corporate restructuring ==
In Australia, the group's former name was High Risk Security Group (Asia-Pacific) Pty Ltd (2010), Paladin Group Pty Ltd (2010-2018) and is now Paladin Aus Pty Ltd (2018–present). Their Australian Business Number is 64 144 000 573.

On 11 February 2019, the Australian Financial Review published an article which alleged that Paladin was connected to a company called High Risk Security Group and a related entity HRSG Australasia Pty Ltd and cited controversies linked to it, this story was retracted by Australian Financial Review on Friday 10 May 2019. On 21 February 2019, Paladin published a statement on its website clarifying that neither of these businesses were owned, managed or controlled in any way by Paladin or its directors.

== Controversies ==
=== Legal dispute with former director ===
Ian Stewart was a director of Paladin Group but left the company in July 2019. In January 2020, Stewart said he would be willing to answer questions at a Senate Inquiry into Paladin. Later in 2020, Mr Stewart sued Paladin Group in South Australia alleging almost $50 million in unpaid wages, and revealed the company had made $1.3 million per week in profit during the Manus contract. Paladin argued that Stewart was entitled to nothing, and alleged the document he relied upon for his claim was a forgery, but failed in a bid to stop the matter from continuing.

=== Registered office locations ===
In February 2019 the company transferred its Australian office to a building in Canberra.

Their main offices are located in Singapore.

=== Government contract tender process ===
Paladin were awarded the Australian Government contract by the Department of Home Affairs without an open tender process, which suggests they were the only company invited to bid. This was despite having little experience and a poor reputation, according to allegations made by the Australian Financial Review, now retracted. Paladin has had a record as a subcontractor providing services on Manus Island dating back to 2013. The Department of Home Affairs stated that it had previously run a closed tender but attracted little response partly because larger companies didn't want the "noise".

The Australian Financial Review reported that Serco, Broadspectrum, Spotless Group, Blue Point Services, Anitua (PNG-based firm) and Canstruct (a Brisbane-based construction firm who later acquired a $591 million contract to manage Nauru Regional Processing Centre) indicated interest in the contract, but were not allowed to bid.

=== Removal of Craig Thrupp from contract ===
In April 2019, it was revealed that Craig Thrupp was removed from the contract at the request of the Home Affairs, out of concern about an email account.

=== Money laundering case ===
Kisokau Powaseu, a former colonel in the Papua New Guinean Defence Force, was detained in Port Moresby in January 2019 on charges of money laundering relating to his time in the Papua New Guinean Defence Force. He was for a brief period, a local director of the company in Papua New Guinea and no further action has occurred in relation to these charges.

=== Civil case ===
The company's former chief executive in PNG, Craig Coleman, was suing Paladin in February 2019 claiming breach of contract and that employees were sent to Manus under misleading pretences.

=== Security dispute ===
In January 2018, there was a dispute between Paladin and Kingfisher Security, a PNG security firm. Kingfisher officers prevented Paladin staff from entering the detention center. Refugees reported feeling unsafe due to the disruption caused by the local firm, however the situation was soon resolved.

=== Alleged corruption ===
In February 2019 it was reported that the family of one of PNG's most powerful politicians was directly benefiting from the business of Paladin. Paladin entered into a contract with Peren Solutions, a company with links to the family of Job Pomat, deputy leader of the ruling People's National Congress Party, speaker of the PNG Parliament, and key ally of Prime Minister Peter O'Neill. Job Pomat, who was elected Speaker of Parliament in 2017, has denied any links to the firm, a position supported by Paladin which stated that Peren represents the traditional landowners of the site that the Lorengau facility is located at, and that they are under the leadership of Kepo Pomat.

The agreement with Peren predates the award of this contract and the election of Mr. Pomat.

In 2019, the Australian High Commission in PNG received a report of alleged attempted bribery involving Paladin. A person claiming to be a PNG government official allegedly contacted Paladin and demanded a bribe. The PNG officials in question have denied doing this, and have alleged that imposters made the demands in their names. Paladin executive David Saul said that there was no evidence to support the allegation, and the alleged approach was similar to another approach Paladin had from a person claiming to be an election official. Ex-director Ian Stewart said there had been many such approaches but he always reported them. In January 2020, the Department of Home Affairs had not referred the allegations to the Australian Federal Police, which is the common course of action in foreign bribery cases.

=== Labour disputes ===
In February 2019, some Paladin employees began a strike, demanding better pay (most were paid between $2–3 per hour), better security, meals, and overtime pay for long shifts. They also complained that some employees had their wages reduced. Police became involved in the situation, and Manus Provincial Police Commander Chief Inspector David Yapu attended a meeting organised by Paladin to address the workers’ demands.

Some employees said they were made redundant at Paladin, before being offered the same jobs at Black Swan (a company owned by Paladin), for less money. One warehouse worker in Port Moresby who spoke to the Australian Broadcasting Network said he was making about AUD $1.50 per hour at Paladin, then was made redundant and rehired by Black Swan on $1.45 per hour.

=== Sexual assault case ===
In April 2019 an Australian Paladin employee was arrested and jailed on Manus Island due to allegations of sexual assault. The employee was a former G4S employee and had returned to Manus to work for Paladin. The alleged victim is a Paladin employee.

=== Australian government audit ===
In March 2019, the Auditor General of Australia announced that he was reviewing all Australian Government contracts for the offshore processing of asylum seekers. This followed a request by the Australian Labor Party for the Auditor to review the Paladin contract. Though, the Auditor General stated that offshore contracts had already been suggested for a performance audit, before Labor's request.

In May 2020 the Auditor General's report was released, with the following findings:

- The awarding of the contract to Paladin was "largely in line" with Federal Government procurement rules.
- The contractor's performance was "partly adequate."
- The Department of Home Affairs had failed to demonstrate value for money in the Paladin contract and other contracts to other companies for services in Manus Island. "Although the department had limited options for comparing tenderer costs, most of the benchmarks it used were not appropriate,"

=== Million Dollars for Mum ===
Thrupp allegedly transferred $1.2 million dollars to his mother who worked at Home Affairs.

== See also ==
- Paladin (disambiguation)
- Paladin Group (fascist organization), an unrelated, defunct fascist mercenary group that operated in Francoist Spain
