= Villawood Immigration Detention Centre =

Immigration Detention Centre in Sydney, Australia

Coordinates: 33°52′28″S 150°59′22″E

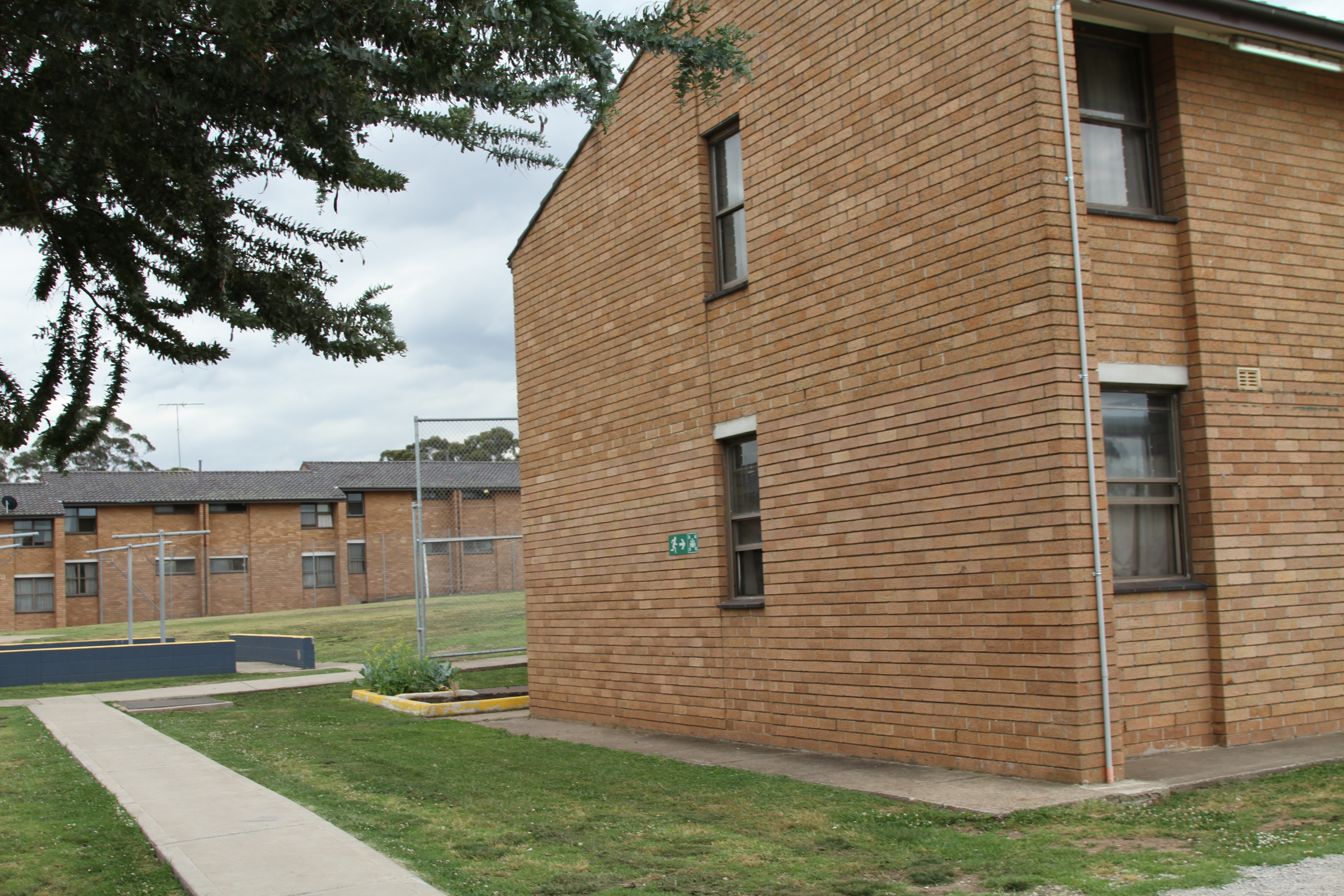
Villawood IDC.

Villawood Immigration Detention Centre, originally Villawood Migrant Hostel or Villawood Migrant Centre, split into a separate section named Westbridge Migrant Hostel from 1968 to 1984, is an Australian immigration detention facility located in the suburb of Villawood in Sydney, Australia.

Built in 1949 to accommodate post-war refugees from Europe, a section of the original camp was converted into an immigration detention centre in 1976.

== History ==
=== Villawood Migrant Hostel ===
The site of the detention centre was previously known as the Villawood Migrant Hostel or Villawood Migrant Centre, built in 1949 to house migrants from post-war Europe to work in local industries. The centre was run by Commonwealth Hostels Ltd, a non-profit company. By 1964 the centre housed 1,425 people, mainly from Britain and Europe. By 1969 it was the largest migrant hostel in Australia, and was at that time housing migrants from Britain, The Netherlands, Denmark, West Germany, France, Czechoslovakia, Yugoslavia and Turkey. In 1968 the centre was divided into two sections, one named the Villawood Migrant Hostel and the other named the Westbridge Migrant Hostel, which operated until 1984.

=== Conversion to a detention centre ===
In 1976 a small section of the hostel was converted to provide security accommodation for persons awaiting deportation. This new section was named the Villawood Immigration Detention Centre.

In 2001 the Villawood Immigration Detention Centre was the subject of controversy when 40 asylum seekers escaped. A month later, a Four Corners documentary, "The Inside Story", revealed the plight of six-year-old Iranian refugee Shayan Bedraie, who had been refusing to speak or eat. Shayan and his family had been detained at Woomera IRPC for 11 months and Villawood IDC for at least 6 months, and had witnessed a number of riots and self-harm incidents. He was periodically taken to hospital to be drip-fed and rehydrated, and then returned to detention.

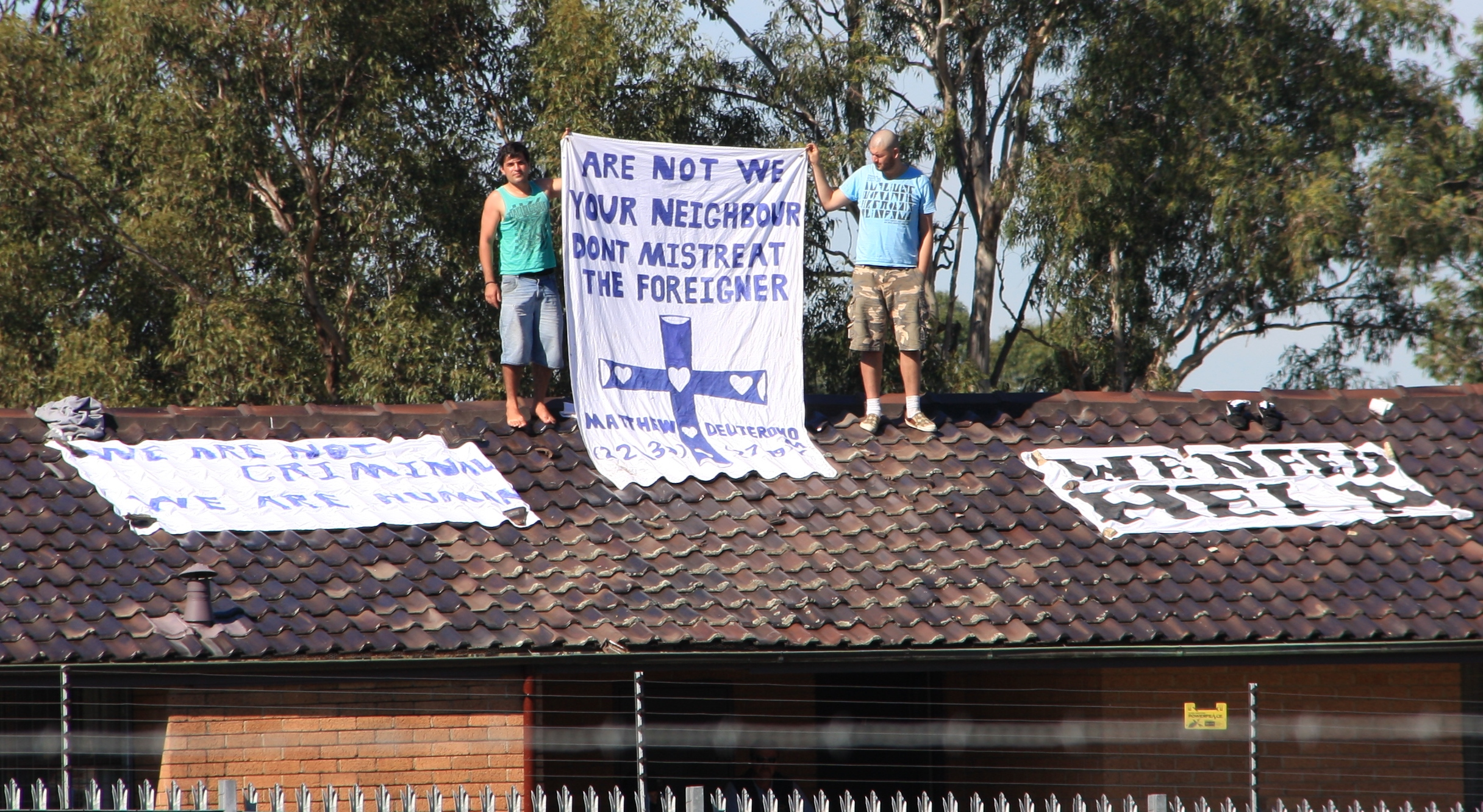
Protesters at the detention centre as of 22 April 2011.

Management of the centre was outsourced to private company G4S Australia from 2003 to 2009.

In January 2008, the Human Rights and Equal Opportunity Commission (HREOC) said the high-security section of Villawood Detention Centre was the "most prison like" of all Australia's immigration detention centres, and demanded it be closed immediately. The HREOC described the infrastructure as dilapidated, and conditions inside the detention centre as "harsh and inhospitable".

Early in the morning of Thursday 21 April 2011, the centre was set alight by detainees.

The centre was planned to close in mid-2019 after the closure of the Maribyrnong Immigration Detention Centre in Melbourne. However, the closure did not eventuate and the centre remained open as of 2025.

In 2020 the centre adopted various measures in response to the COVID-19 pandemic in Australia, but human rights organisations including HREOC have called upon the Australian Government to release detainees into the community to better protect themselves against COVID-19, as social distancing is not possible in the centre.

In November 2023, a Serco employee was criminally charged during a corruption investigation into drug trafficking. An investigation into conditions in Australia’s privately run centres found detainees are openly growing marijuana plants in their rooms at Sydney’s Villawood detention centre, as Australian Border Force conceded drug and alcohol use have led to violent and dangerous conditions.

=== Deaths ===
- In July 2001, Avion Gumede, a thirty-year-old South African male, died by suicide hours after being detained in Villawood.
- In September 2001, Puangthong Simaplee, a twenty-seven-year-old Thai national, was found deceased at the centre. She had been sold to traffickers when she was 12, smuggled to Australia on a false passport, and forced to work in a brothel. At the time of her arrest she was a heroin addict. On entering immigration detention she went into withdrawal, received inadequate medical treatment, and died three days later. In 2010 the Australian government made an ex-gratia payment to Simaplee's parents.
- In February 2002, Thi Hang Le, a Vietnamese national, died by suicide by jumping from the balcony from which she had twice previously attempted suicide. She had been discharged from a psychiatric unit days before, and had not taken her medication.
- In August 2004, Marc Lao Thao, a French man in his seventies who had been held at Villawood detention centre, died of a brain hemorrhage. A visitor to the detention centre told the Inquiry into his death that: "When I saw Marc he had just been operated on for a hernia and was back from hospital. The younger detainees worried about him because he was vomiting every night. Marc was taken to the hospital only when he collapsed. I went to see him in Liverpool Hospital. There were two guards to look after an unconscious sick man. He never regained consciousness and died the next day"
- In January 2008, Pishevaraz Khodaverdi died of heart failure after collapsing on the steps of St George Private Hospital on his way to an appointment there two days earlier. Mr Khodzverdi had been held in Villawood for the previous three months after being assessed as unfit to be deported.
- In January 2008, a sixty-two-year-old Iranian man known as Mr Fashovar, was found dead due to a heart condition.
- In September 2010, thirty-six year old Fijian national, Josefa Rauluni, died by suicide by jumping off a roof at Villawood Immigration Detention Centre, Sydney, hours before he was to be deported.
- In November 2010, forty-year-old Iraqi national, Ahmad al-Akabi, died by suicide. Mr Al Akabi's bid for asylum had been rejected twice in the previous year. The room in which he has been kept was described as ''purpose-built for the purpose of death'' by the Department of Immigration's own safety advisory head.
- In December 2010, David Saunders, a twenty-nine-year-old British national, died by suicide.
- In September 2011, a Sri Lankan man known as 'Shooty', died by suicide at the centre. He had been in detention for just over two years and had been accepted as a refugee about seven months ago, but was waiting for a security assessment.
- In February 2012, Ali Rahimi, a forty-four-year-old Iranian national, died in hospital of heart attack, possibly caused by anxiety suffered after time in detention at Villawood and repeated rejection of asylum claim. Refugee activist Ian Rintoul said the man was Iranian and had fled his home country in 2010 after being arrested and jailed for participating in pro-democracy protests. He arrived in Australia by plane in April 2010 and had been in detention since then. Mr Rintoul said the man had a wife and two children in Iran and a cousin in Australia.
- In June 2013, Ali Ahmad Jafari, a 26-year-old Afghan man, died of a heart attack. His mother took him and his siblings to Quetta in Pakistan when he was 10 after his father was suspected to have been killed by the Taliban. He later sought asylum in the UK but was deported back to Afghanistan in 2009, apparently because his grounds for protection were deemed to be insufficient. Then he fled to Australia and arrived on Christmas Island in 2010, saying he had been beaten by the Taliban. His claim for asylum was rejected and he appealed the decision. He had spent most of the past three years in detention. According to refugee advocates, the Immigration Department allowed Mr Jafari to live in the community in February 2012. But seven months later he was detained again at Villawood.
- In April 2016, a 42-year-old man named Rob Peihopa, from New Zealand, died of a heart attack after he was involved in a fight. Mr Peihopa, who moved to Australia in 1989, served two years in prison for his involvement in a police chase but on the day of his release he was picked up by immigration officers after his visa was cancelled. At the time, Mr Peihopa had feared he would be deported back to New Zealand, leaving behind his three sons.
- In January 2019, Moses Kellie ('Musa'), a man in his 30s from Sierra Leone was found dead at the detention centre. He had entered Australia on a humanitarian visa. The police have stated his death does not appear suspicious.
- In March 2019, 25 year old, Iraqi male died by suicide in Villawood Detention Centre. His death is being investigated.
- In March 2019, Milad Aljaberi, a twenty-five-year-old Iraqi male, died of a suspected drug overdose of crystal methamphetamine while at Villawood.
- In December 2020, a twenty-nine-year-old Malaysian man known only as Muhammad, was found deceased at the centre. No further details have been made public.
- In March 2022, a male, a Kurd from Iran, died by suicide after being bullied by other detainees and the refusal of staff to transfer him out of the high-security compound.
- In May 2022, a woman from New Zealand with mental health difficulties was found deceased from suicide. She had allegedly been denied her request of medication by Serco detention officers.
- In 2023 another man detained at the centre died in what is believed to be a suicide. The man in his thirties, originally from Iraq, was found lifeless in his cell after living at the centre for five years.
- In June 2023, an African man died from a drug overdose at the centre. He was a humanitarian refugee with a wife and family in Australia, but whose permanent visa had been cancelled because he had breached Covid restrictions.

== Description ==
Villawood Detention Centre is located at 15 Birmingham Avenue, Villawood.

It houses a mix of asylum seekers, people who have overstayed their visas and Section 501 detainees who have had their visas cancelled following criminal convictions and are awaiting deportation after serving prison sentences. At 31 May 2021 it held 485 people including 278 Section 501 visa cancellations, 74 asylum seekers who arrived by boat, and 133 detainees in other categories.

People refused entry into the country at international airports and seaports may also be detained there. The centre has been the focus of much controversy, with accusations of human rights abuses.

Since 2009 the centre has been managed by private prison company Serco. with the Australian Border Force, an agency of the Department of Home Affairs, responsible for the welfare of the detainees.

== See also ==
- List of Australian immigration detention facilities
- We Can Be Heroes: Finding The Australian of the Year
