= Northern Immigration Detention Centre =

Immigration detention center in Coonawarra, Australia

Coordinates: 12.429905°S 130.912274°E

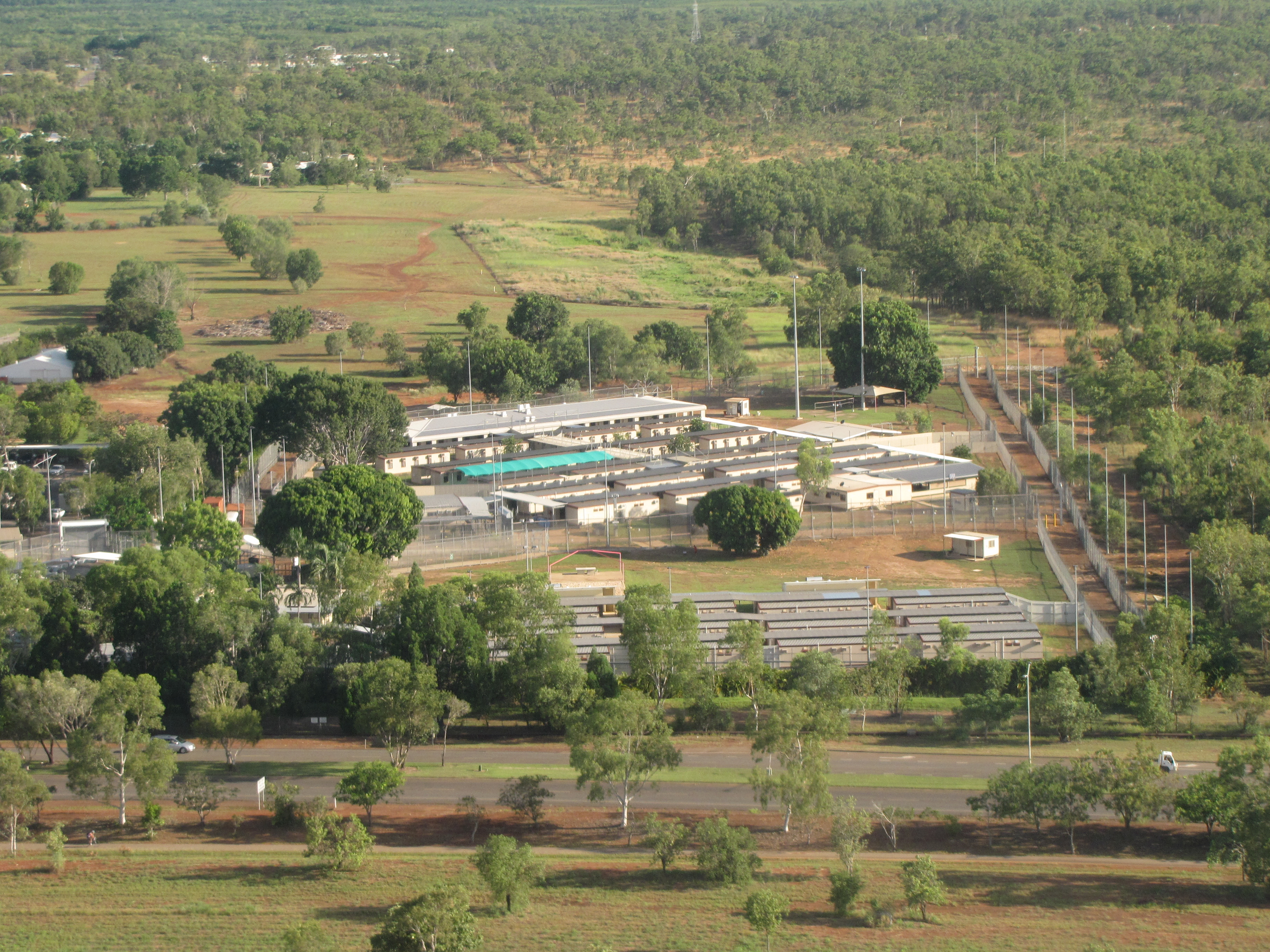
Northern IDC (2010)

Northern Immigration Detention Centre is a facility operated by the Australian Department of Home Affairs to house people and process their applications concerning immigration detention. It is located at Coonawarra, an outer Darwin suburb and is described as primarily accommodating illegal foreign fishers. It has an operating capacity of 554 people.

In 2009, it was managed by G4S, a private company, but this is no longer the case.

On 30 August 2010 100 detainees staged a riot and climbed on the roofs of buildings in the facility. The following day 90 Afghan inmates escaped and staged a peaceful protest along the side of the Stuart Highway nearby.

== See also ==
- List of Australian immigration detention facilities
