= Melbourne Immigration Transit Accommodation =

Australian immigration detention centre

Coordinates: 37.685°S 144.946°E

- Interactive map of Melbourne Immigration Transit Accommodation
- Location: Maygar Barracks
- Status: Operating
- Opened: 2008

Melbourne Immigration Transit Accommodation (MITA) is an Australian immigration detention centre in the Melbourne suburb of Broadmeadows. It was built on part of the Maygar Barracks site. It is operated by Serco under contract to the Australian Border Force.

When it was constructed in 2008, it provided short-term hostel-style accommodation using the former officer's mess. It has since been extended, including a high-security compound opened in 2018. The high-security compound replaced the Maribyrnong Immigration Detention Centre which was closed at the end of 2018.

== See also ==
- Immigration detention in Australia
