= Canstruct International =

Australian company

Canstruct
- Type: Multinational
- Industry: Construction, Facilities management, other services
- Predecessors: Force 10
- Founded: 1960s, Australia
- Founder: Robin Murphy
- Headquarters: Brisbane, Queensland, Australia
- Areas served: Australia, South Pacific Islands, Nauru
- Key people: Rory Murphy (CEO), Robin Murphy (founder)
- Website: canstruct.com.au

Canstruct is a facilities management, construction, and service provision company based in Brisbane, Queensland, Australia, with operations in the Pacific region.

The company's headquarters is located at 769 Fairfield Rd, Yeerongpilly (a suburb of Brisbane).

Canstruct has three core business divisions: Humanitarian Services; Infrastructure; and Support Services.

As of February 2022, Canstruct is owned by a holding company, Rard No 3. The holding company's directors are Robin Murphy and his three sons, Rory, Adrian and Daniel.

== Operations ==
The company describes their work as "logistics, facilities management, construction and engineering, education and recreation services, community engagement, and disaster and emergency relief".

Robin Murphy is a recipient of the medal of the Order of Australia for "services to the construction industry."

=== Nauru contract ===
Canstruct held a AUD $591 million contract from the Australian Government to provide services at Nauru Regional Processing Centre - an Australian immigration detention centre on the pacific island nation of Nauru.

Canstruct had a contract with the Australian Government in Nauru since 2012 with the current contract commencing in October 2017, when Canstruct took over from Broadspectrum on Nauru.

In November 2018 the contract was ending and the company was preparing to hand over control of Nauru Regional Processing Centre to a Nauruan Government commercial entity. Between October 2017 and November 2018 Canstruct made a profit of $43 million running the detention centre.

The contract was granted to Canstruct through a limited tender process with only one bidder - Canstruct itself. The government said this was because other companies declined to bid, and added that Canstruct's experience with managing mining camps made them suitable for managing an immigration detention centre.

By April 2021, the Nauru contract had been amended six times, and Canstruct had been paid a total of AUD $1.4 billion over its course. Although, there had been no new people put into immigration detention on Nauru since 2014.

As of February 2022, the Nauru contract was held by Rard No 3, a holding company that owned Canstruct. The directors of Rard No 3 were Robin Murphy and his three sons Rory, Adrian and Daniel. The Nauru contract was the only significant contract that the company held.

Rard No 3 had $340 million in cash and investments, compared to Canstruct having only $8 million before the Nauru contract was awarded. Rard No 3 made $101 million profit in the previous financial year, about $500,000 per detainee on Nauru (of which there was 115).

It cost Australian taxpayers $12,000 per day - about $4 million per year - for each detainee held on Nauru.

The most recent contract extension was in January 2022, to 22 June 2022, for $218.5 million. There is an option to extend for six months beyond.

=== Other ===
In April 2015 Canstruct indicated interest in a contract to Manus Regional Processing Centre on Manus Island, Papua New Guinea. However, they were unsuccessful in their bid. The contract was eventually awarded to Paladin Group in a closed tender (only one bidder allowed) and was worth $423 million.

Prior to being awarded the 2017 contract, Canstruct had been operating on Nauru since 2012, though mostly in construction work rather than welfare and garrison services.

Canstruct's website indicates that they have operated in 31 countries across the Asia-Pacific, Iran, UAE, Seychelles and The Americas. Their first contract was in 1966, to construct bridges in the highlands of Papua New Guinea.

Strategic Indigenous Housing and Infrastructure Program

In 2009 they were involved in the Earth Connect Alliance (60% interest) with a $55 million contract constructing homes for indigenous people. The homes were being constructed in remote parts of Australia's Northern Territory as part of the Government's Strategic Indigenous Housing and Infrastructure Program. In 2010 Canstruct was removed from the contract over concerns they would not build the houses on time, and the government prepared to demolish some partly-built homes. In response, Robin Murphy said "demolishing these houses would be a scandalous waste of taxpayers' money and is a way of covering up mistakes made by SIHIP.". In September 2012 the parties agreed to fully and finally resolve all issues in relation to the project including a payment to the participants.

Oro Bridges

In 2013-2016 they were contracted for $139.5 million to re-construct bridges in Oro Province, Papua New Guinea. which had been previously destroyed by Cyclone Guba.

At time of construction, the Kumusi Bridge was the largest two-lane bridge in Papua New Guinea. At the opening ceremony, Gary Juffa, Governor of Oro Province said: “We have come to know Canstruct. They have been part of our community. Even when they leave, they will still be in our hearts. They have left a footprint that we will remember forever. We want to thank the Australian people. The bridges represent a wonderful gift from Australia.”

Tuberculosis (TB) Ward

In 2017 Canstruct commenced construction of a new tuberculosis (TB) Ward in Papua New Guinea. This project was instigated by the Oro Community Development Project, (OCDP) which is an Australian humanitarian aid organisation. Canstruct provided more than $150,000 of support to undertake completed this project as a gift to the community.

Disaster Relief

On February 8, 2016, the Papua New Guinea Today publication reported Canstruct was assisting in urgent Disaster Relief operations after major flooding tore down several temporary bridges and crossings in the region

Scott Base Redevelopment, Antarctica

In February 2020, Canstruct was the only Australian firm to be shortlisted for the Scott Base research facility redevelopment project (announced on Antarctica New Zealand's website).

== Acquisitions ==
Canstruct's website states that:

- In 1984 they were purchased by Christiani & Nielsen, then a Danish company, but that in 1987 Robin Murphy bought Canstruct back.
- In 2004 they purchased Force 10, an engineering and construction company specialising in modular building.

Force 10's website states that in May 2017 they were taken over by Stratco (see manufacturing in Australia).

== Controversy ==
=== Political donations ===
On October 10, 2017, Rory Murphy paid $3,500 to attend a Liberal National Party dinner event in Australia. This was while Canstruct were negotiating the Nauru contract with the Australian Government. On September 28, the Government had issued a letter of intent to grant Canstruct a small $8 million, 6-month contract to provide garrison services on Nauru. The Liberal National Party was in government at the time (see 2016 Australian federal election).

In November 2018, a further $3000 was donated to the LNP by a company of which Rory Murphy is a director.

Rory Murphy denied that the donations had any impact on the Government's eventual decision to grant Canstruct a $591 million contract.

As of February 2022, Canstruct had made 11 political donations to the Liberal National Party in Queensland. The lucrative Nauru detention centre management contract had been extended at least until June 2022.

=== Criticism ===
When Canstruct was about to take up the Nauru contract in 2017, it was criticised by the Human Rights Law Centre, Amnesty International and GetUp!. HRLC (an Australian human rights advocacy group) said Canstruct was taking up a "poisoned chalice" and that it would be "complicit" in an "internationally abusive system", that there was no ethical way for it to be involved. Amnesty International's director for global issues, Audrey Gaughran, said “The company will provide the very services that sustain a system that keeps women, men and children trapped in a cycle of cruelty and desperation,”. GetUp! (an Australian left wing lobby group) said that abuse, including child abuse, had been reported on Nauru and that Canstruct would be responsible for doing business in abuse.

Keren Adams from the HRLC said “It is particularly appalling that the contract has been awarded to an engineering company with zero experience dealing with vulnerable people [...] Canstruct is an engineering company with a background building bridges. In accepting this contract, it will be taking the job of running a cruel, open-air prison detaining people, including many children, who are deeply traumatised.”.

As of early 2019, Canstruct had transitioned all residents out of the Regional Processing Centres on Nauru into the community. No children remain in detention on Nauru.

In early 2019, ABC News reported that the Australian Government confirmed all asylum seeker children have either been removed from Nauru or are about to leave the island.
