= Baxter Immigration Reception and Processing Centre =

Immigration detention facility in South Australia

Coordinates: 32°32′34″S 137°40′43″E

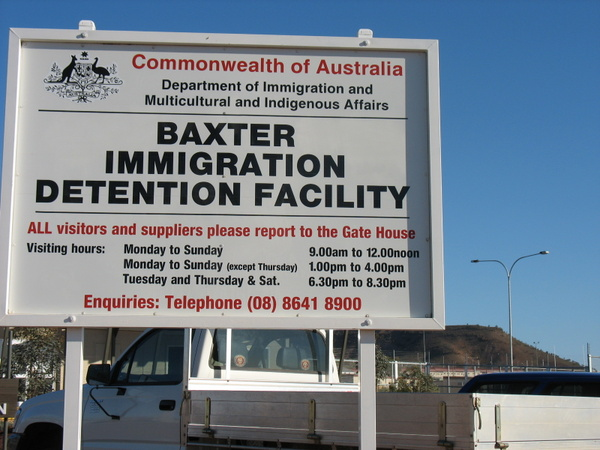
Baxter Immigration Detention Facility

Baxter Immigration Reception and Processing Centre or commonly just Baxter Detention Centre, was an Australian immigration detention facility near the town of Port Augusta in South Australia. It was the focus of much of the controversy concerning the mandatory detention of asylum seekers in Australia.

== History ==
Baxter Detention Centre was named after the nearby Baxter Range, a geographical feature which in turn is named after the explorer John Baxter who, ironically, arrived in Australia as a convict. It was located on a portion of the Australian Defence Force's El Alamein Army Reserve that was nearest to Port Augusta. Following establishment expenditure of $44 million, Baxter Detention Centre became operational in September 2002.

After it closed in August 2007, some of the buildings were removed and the land returned to the Department of Defence. In May 2008, a public auction was held for the surplus material remaining in the complex.

== Facility ==
The centre was built by Fleetwood Portables in partnership with the Department of Immigration. Australasian Correctional Management was responsible for the administration of the centre.

== Controversy ==
The centre suffered several arson incidents by protesting detainees, including on 12 November 2005, which caused extensive damage and forcing the evacuation of 58 detainees, of whom 4 were treated for smoke inhalation. Minister for Immigration, Amanda Vanstone, said of the incident: "We don't expect however for people to resort to property damage as a way of handling that frustration and particularly property damage that can put the lives of others at risk."

== See also ==
- Baxter Protests
- Cornelia Rau
- List of Australian immigration detention facilities
