= Nauru Regional Processing Centre =

Offshore Australian immigration detention facility in Meneng, Nauru

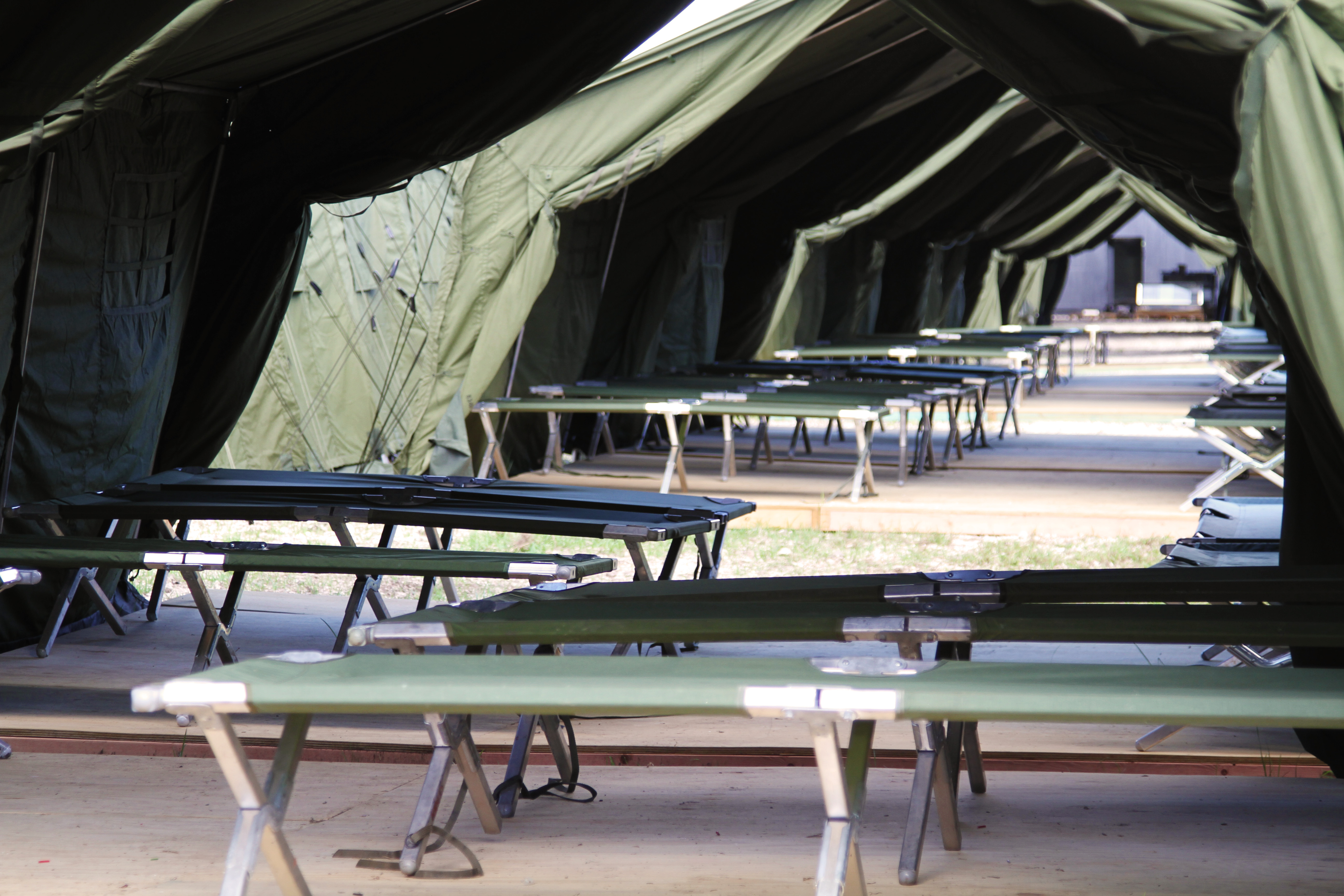
- Tents and cots from the Nauru offshore processing facility in September 2012

- Location in Nauru
- Location: Meneng District, Nauru; 0°32′26″S 166°55′50″E
- Status: Open
- Population: 11 (as of October 2023)
- Opened: 2001; 2012; 2021
- Closed: 2008; 2019
- Managed by: Government of Nauru

The Nauru Regional Processing Centre is an offshore Australian immigration detention facility that has been in use from 2001 to 2008, from 2012 to 2019, and from September 2021. It is located on the South Pacific island nation of Nauru and run by the government thereof with support from the Australian government. The use of immigration detention facilities is part of a policy of mandatory detention in Australia.

The Nauru facility was first opened in 2001 as part of the Howard government's Pacific Solution. The centre was suspended in 2008 to fulfil an election promise by the Rudd government, but was reopened in August 2012 by the Gillard government after a large increase in the number of maritime arrivals by asylum seekers and pressure from the opposition led by Tony Abbott. It was reclosed in 2019 before reopening for a second time in September 2021. Current Coalition and Labor Party policy states that because all detainees attempted to reach Australia by boat, they will never be settled in Australia, even though many of the asylum seekers detained on the island have been assessed as genuine refugees.

The highest population at the centre was 1,233 detainees in August 2014. As of 7 September 2023, there were 11 people in the detention centre.

== Timeline ==
=== 2001-2008: Establishment and First Closure ===
In September 2001, the Parliament of Australia passed two amendments to the Migration Act 1958 which allowed Australia to excise Christmas, Ashmore, Cartier and Cocos (Keeling) Islands from its migration zone. This brought the Pacific Solution into effect, which meant that "any unlawful non-citizen attempting to enter Australia via one of these islands was now prevented from making a valid application for a protection visa and claim refugee status". The only exception was if the Minister for Immigration determined that such an action was in "the public interest".

The establishment of an offshore processing centre on Nauru was based on a Statement of Principles, signed on 10 September 2001, by the then President of Nauru René Harris, and Australia's Minister for Defence at the time, Peter Reith. The statement opened the way to establish a detention centre for up to 800 people and was accompanied by a pledge of A$20 million, equivalent to A$34.1 million in 2022, for development activities. Initial plans were for asylum seekers to be housed in modern, air-conditioned housing which had been built for the games of the International Weightlifting Federation. This plan was changed after landowners' requests for extra compensation were rejected. Two camps were built. The first camp, called Topside, was at an old sports ground and oval in the Meneng District (0.540564°S 166.929703°E). The second camp, called State House, was on the site of the old Presidential quarters also in the Meneng District (0.547597°S 166.939697°E). The Topside camp remained empty and was being maintained on a contingency basis.

The initial detainees were to be people rescued by MV Tampa, with the understanding that they would leave Nauru by May 2002. The processing facility in Nauru was established on 19 September 2001, managed and operated by The International Organization for Migration (IOM), with the arrival of majority of the 433 asylum seekers, 283 (Note: The remaining 150 were transferred to New Zealand.), rescued during the Tampa affair and also a group of unauthorised arrivals who were found at Ashmore Island. The opening of the processing centre revatlised Nauru's struggling economy, generating A$5.5 million of the island’s total estimated GDP in 2001 of A$28.5 million. A memorandum of understanding (MoU) was signed on 11 December, boosting accommodation to 1,200 and the promised development activity by an additional A$10 million.

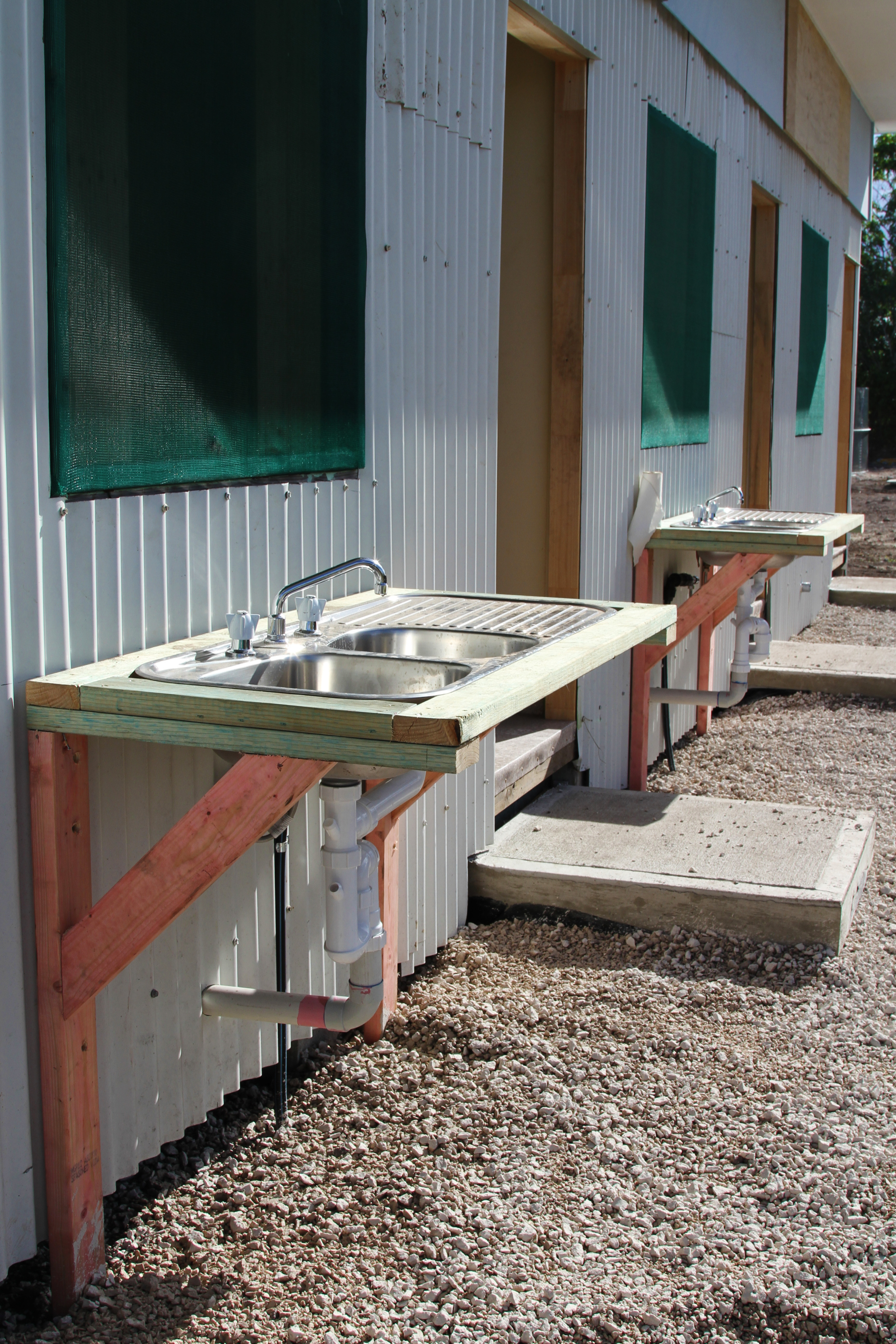
Outdoor sinks at the centre

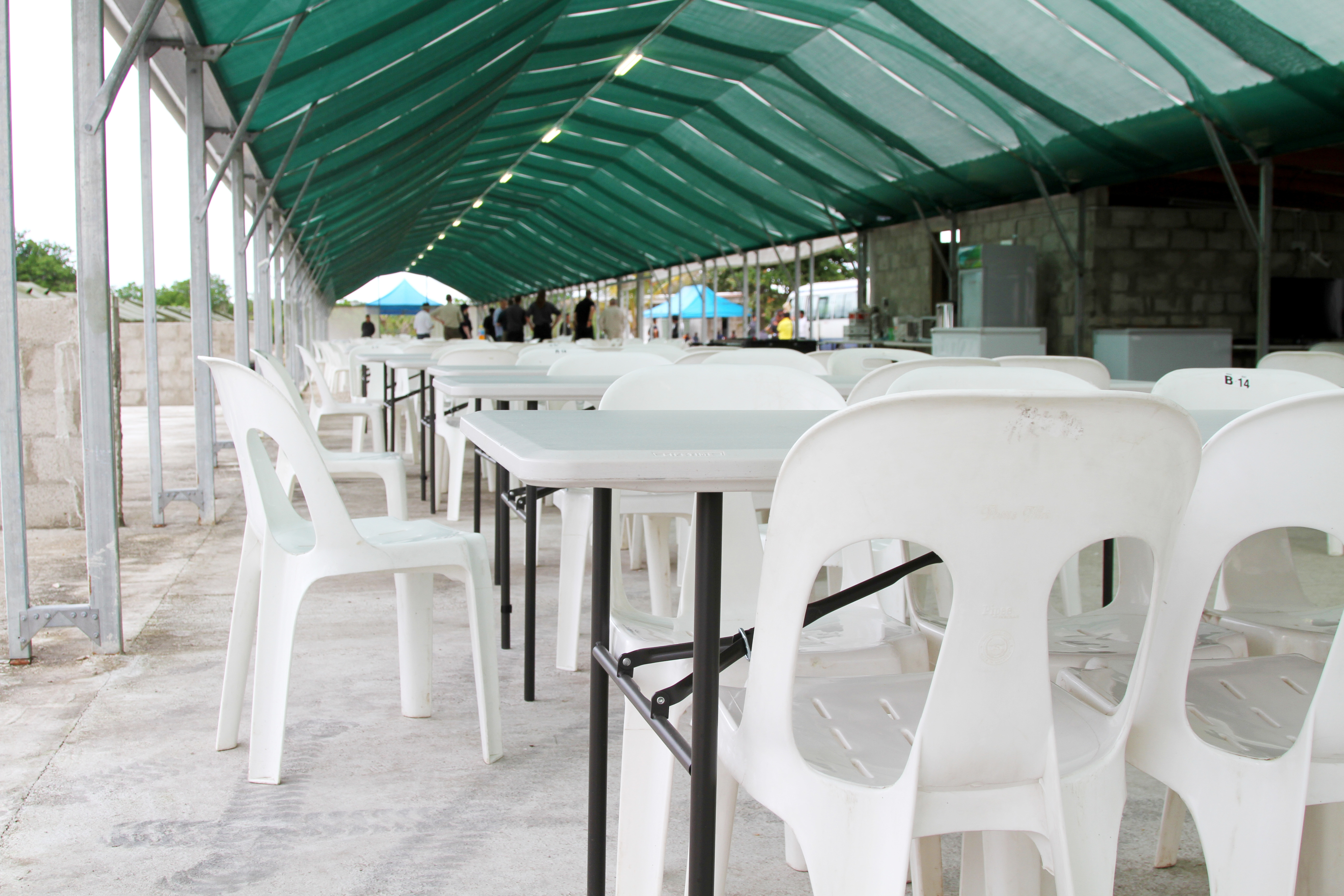
Central space

By January 2002, there were a total of 1,118 asylum seekers in detention on Nauru. A month-long hunger strike began on 10 December 2003. It included mostly Hazara from Afghanistan rescued during the Tampa affair, who were protesting for a review of their cases. Between 2001 and 2004, 19 babies born at the centre. By 2005, 54 people were detained in Nauru as asylum seekers. In September 2006, a group of eight Burmese Rohingya men were transferred to the centre from Christmas Island. The last two asylum seekers from the original group of arrivals in 2001 left Nauru in August 2006 and February 2007. The last one, an Iraqi, was accepted by Sweden in February 2007. On 15 March 2007, the Australian Government announced that 82 Tamils from Sri Lanka would be transferred from Christmas Island to the Nauru detention centre. They arrived in Nauru by the end of the month.

In December 2007, newly elected Australian Prime Minister Kevin Rudd announced that his country would no longer make use of the Nauru detention centre, and would put an immediate end to the Pacific Solution. The last remaining Burmese and some of the Sri Lankan detainees were granted residency rights in Australia the same month. Nauru reacted with concern at the prospect of potentially losing much-needed aid from Australia, which could also lead to an economic collapse of the nation.

On 8 February 2008, Minister for Immigration and Citizenship Chris Evans issued a press release stating that the Australian Government had started discussions with Nauru about closing the centre. The last of the detainees, 21 Sri Lankans, arrived in Australia the same and day and were resettled. Evans also stated, "The Pacific Solution was a cynical, costly and ultimately unsuccessful exercise introduced on the eve of a federal election by the Howard Government." This marked a formal end to the Pacific Solution and closure of the detention centre on Nauru. The move was welcomed by the UN Refugee Agency. Opposition immigration spokesman Chris Ellison said the closure could suggest to people-smugglers that Australia was weakening on border protection.

The press release also outlined that the Department of Immigration and Citizenship had spent A$289 million between September 2001 and June 2007 to run the Nauru and Manus offshore processing facilities. The use of both the facilities was suspended and asylum claims of future unauthorised boat arrivals were to be processed on a new immigration detention centre built on Christmas Island. A total of 1,322 refugees, mostly Afghans and Iraqis, were processed in the facility on Nauru prior to its closure in 2008. Majority of these refugees were resettled in Australia.

Nauru caseloads (2001-2008)
Nationality	Resettled refugee	Resettled non-refugee	Returned voluntarily	Deceased	Total
Afghanistan	329	36	420	1	786
Bangladesh	—N/a	3	3	—N/a	6
Iran	2	1	16	—N/a	19
Iraq	327	37	24	—N/a	388
Myanmar	7	—N/a	1	—N/a	8
Pakistan	1	1	6	—N/a	8
Palestine	19	—N/a	—N/a	—N/a	19
Sri Lanka	84	—N/a	4	—N/a	88
Total	769	78	474	1	1,322
Source: Data provided to the Australian Parliamentary Library by the Department of Immigration and Citizenship (DIAC) in 2010.

=== 2012-2020: Reopening and Second Closure ===
In August 2012, the Australian Labor government led by Prime Minister Julia Gillard announced the resumption of the transfer of asylum seekers arriving by boat in Australia to Nauru and Manus. Australia signed an initial memorandum of understanding (MoU) with Nauru on 29 August 2012. The first group arrived the following month. The reopening of the centres sparked criticism of the Australian government after the United Nations refused to assist the government with the mandatory measures. In November 2012, an Amnesty International team visited the camp and described it as "a human rights catastrophe [...] a toxic mix of uncertainty, unlawful detention and inhumane conditions". The MoU between Nauru and Australia was renegotiated, signed and entered into force on 3 August 2013. Clause 12 of the 2013 MoU allowed for resettlement of refugees in Nauru:

The Republic of Nauru undertakes to enable Transferees who it determines are in need of international protection to settle in Nauru, subject to agreement between Participants on arrangements and numbers.

On 19 July 2013, a riot occurred at the detention centre and caused damages valued at A$60 million (equivalent to A$73.8 million in 2022). Police and guards had rocks and sticks thrown at them. Four people were hospitalised with minor injuries, while others were treated for bruising and cuts. The riot began at 3 pm local time when the detainees staged a protest. Up to 200 detainees escaped and about 60 were held overnight at the island's police station. Several vehicles and buildings including accommodation blocks for up to 600 people, offices, dining room, and the health centre were destroyed by fire, equating to about 80 percent of the centre's buildings. 129 of 545 male detainees were identified as being involved in the rioting and were detained in the police watch house.

In August 2014, the population at the centre reached 1,233 detainees. A number of detainees were returned to their countries of origin, including Iraq and Iran. In October 2015, Nauru declared that the asylum seekers housed in the detention centre now had freedom of movement around the island. Given reports that three women had been raped and numerous other assaults had taken place against asylum seekers, it was reported that this might actually increase the amount of danger to them.

In November 2016, Prime Minister Malcolm Turnbull announced that Australia had made a deal with the US to resettle people in detention on Nauru and Manus. However, little information was made public on how many of the refugees would be resettled by the US. Initial reports estimated that up to 1,250 refugees would be resettled. Prime Minister Malcolm Turnbull indicated that the priority was "very much on the most vulnerable", particularly families on Nauru. On 27 February 2017, the Australian Department of Immigration and Border Protection told a Senate estimates committee that preliminary screening had started as part of the resettlement deal, but officials from the United States Department of Homeland Security had not yet been authorised to start formally vetting applicants.

By November 2018, 430 refugees from Nauru had been resettled in the United States, but hopes of the United States taking more had faded. Although New Zealand had repeatedly offered to take 150 per year, the Australian Government refused. There were still 23 children on the island, as the government had bowed to public pressure and started removing families with children, after reports of suicidal behaviour and resignation syndrome had emerged.

On 3 February 2019, Prime Minister Scott Morrison announced that the last four families with children left on Nauru were about to leave for the United States. They would be the last of the more than 200 children who had been held on the island when the Coalition won government in 2013. On 13 February 2019, a bill which became known as the Medevac bill, was narrowly passed by the Australian parliament allowing doctors to have more say in the process by which asylum seekers on Nauru and Manus may be medically evacuated and brought to the mainland for treatment not being provided in Nauru nor Manus. According to this bill, the approval of two doctors was required, but the approval could still be overridden by the Minister for Home Affairs.

By 31 March 2019, there were no people held in the detention centre and it was closed. The Australian government reported that by 28 August 2019, there were 288 people left on Nauru island; 330 had been resettled in the United States; and another 85 people had been approved for resettlement in the United States, but had not yet left. In late 2019, the Australian government reported that by 30 September 2019, the total number of asylum seekers left in Nauru and Manus was 562 (23 percent of the peak, in June 2014), 1,117 people had been "temporarily transferred to Australia for medical treatment or as accompanying family members" and 632 refugees had been resettled in the United States.

In March 2020, Home Affairs told the Senate estimates committee that "211 refugees and asylum seekers remained on Nauru, 228 in Papua New Guinea, and about 1,220, including their dependents, were in Australia to receive medical treatment". Transfer and resettlement of approved refugees in the US was proceeding during the COVID-19 pandemic. By 13 June 2020, a father and son were the last family left; there was one single woman and the remaining people were all single men. In June 2020, over 100 men from Nauru and Manus were being detained in a hotel in Kangaroo Point in Brisbane, after being transferred to the mainland for medical treatment. They were confined to quarters under a lockdown during the COVID-19 pandemic. The men held protests from their balconies, and protesters gathered outside on several occasions. The 25 men were released into the community in February 2021.

=== 2021-present: Second Reopening ===
There were around 107 asylum seekers remaining on Nauru as of July 2021. In September 2021, the Minister for Home Affairs signed a new deal with Nauru to keep an ongoing form of asylum seeker processing centre on the island.

On 6 October 2021, the Australian Government passed responsibility for the remaining 124 men on PNG to the PNG Government. The remaining men were told that their options were either to transfer to Nauru or resettle in PNG. The official number of asylum seekers on Nauru was 107 on 31 July 2021. The operators of the facility, Canstruct, made a profit of at least A$500,000 per detainee in the financial year ending mid-2021. As of February 2022 there were 115 held by Australia on Nauru, costing the government more than A$4 million per year per asylum seeker (equating to nearly A$12,000 per day).

In 2022, the newly elected Prime Minister Anthony Albanese stated that Australia would end its offshore detention policy. In June 2023, the last remaining refugee detained on the island was evacuated to Australia, signaling a break with the policy but the government stated that it would continue to maintain the offshore detention facilities in Nauru as a "contingency". The break in policy was short-lived as on 7 September 2023, eleven people, the first in nine years, were transferred to the detention centre. On 8 November 2023, the High Court of Australia ruled that it was unlawful for people to be indefinitely detained in immigration detention in NZYQ v Minister for Immigration, twenty years after it had ruled it constitutionally valid in Al-Kateb v Godwin.

== Operators ==
Between 2012 and October 2017, Broadspectrum (formerly known as Transfield Services; now Ventia) subcontracted Wilson Security to perform the operations at Manus and Nauru. In September 2016 Wilson announced that it would be withdrawing at the end of its contract in October 2017, citing damage to its reputation, and Ferrovial, major owner of Broadspectrum, also announced that it would cease providing services to the Department of Immigration and Border Protection at the same date.

In January 2017, the Australian National Audit Office published an audit of the government's contract management of security and support services at the offshore processing centres. The report found "the Department of Immigration and Border Protection's management of the garrison support and welfare services contracts at the offshore processing centres... has fallen well short of effective contract management practice." It went on to highlight several weaknesses and gave three recommendations.

In October 2017, the Brisbane firm Canstruct International signed a contract with the Australian Government, initially worth over A$591 million. The company made more than A$43 million profit it its first financial year (ending 30 June 2018). It was intended that control should be handed over to a Nauruan Government commercial entity, the Nauru Regional Processing Centre Corporation on 31 October, but the date was pushed forward. At the time of the handover to Canstruct, the company had assets of A$8. In the financial year ending mid-2021, Canstruct made a profit of A$101 million, which works out to over A$500,000 for each detainee (then numbering fewer than 200).

== Conditions and human rights issues ==
On 19 July 2013, there was a major riot in the detention centre. Several buildings were destroyed by fire, and damage was estimated at A$60 million, equivalent to A$73.8 in 2022. Hunger strikes and self-harm, including detainees sewing their lips together, have been reported at the facility, as well as at least two people setting themselves on fire. Other attempted suicides were also reported. Medical staff have been provided by International Organization for Migration.

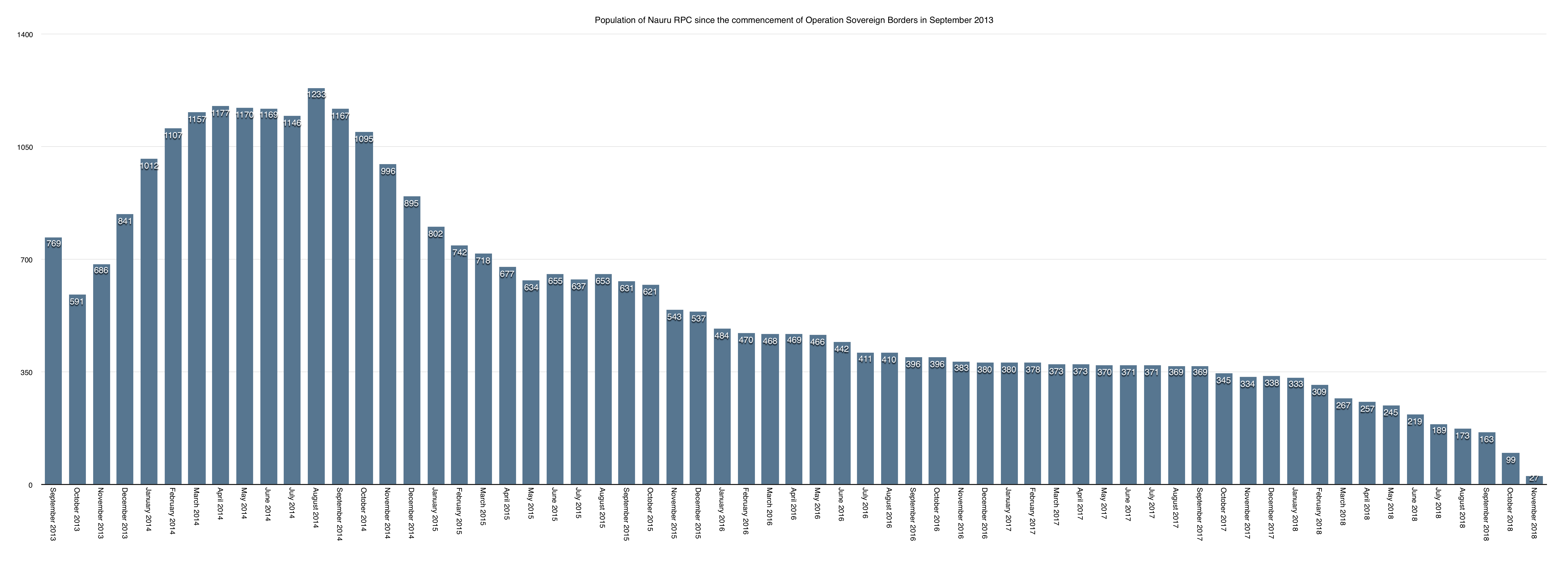
Graph of detainee population by month at the Nauru Regional Processing Centre since the commencement of Operation Sovereign Borders in September 2013

An overwhelming sense of despair has been repeatedly expressed by detainees because of the uncertainty of their situation and their remoteness from loved ones. In 2013, a veteran nurse described the detention centre as "like a concentration camp".

In 2015, several staff members from the detention centre wrote an open letter claiming that multiple instances of sexual abuse against women and children had occurred. The letter claimed that the Australian Government had been aware of these claimed abuses for over 18 months. This letter added weight to the Moss review which found it possible that "guards had traded marijuana for sexual favours with asylum seeker children".

In 2018, reports of children engaging in self-harm and attempting suicide drew attention back to the conditions at the centre. Children as young as eight were documented as exhibiting suicidal behaviours, and an estimated 30 children were described as suffering from resignation syndrome, a supposedly progressive, deteriorating psychiatric condition. Extreme trauma experienced both in their country of origin and in their daily lives at the camp, coupled with a sense of hopelessness and abandonment, contributed to the onset of this condition.

== Media access ==
Media access to the island of Nauru, and the Regional Processing Centre in particular, is tightly controlled by the Nauruan government. In January 2014, the Nauru government announced it was raising the cost of a media visa to the island from A$200 to A$8,000, non-refundable if the visa was not granted. Since then journalists from Al Jazeera, the ABC, SBS and The Guardian have stated that they have applied for media visas with no success. The last journalist to visit the island before the commencement of Operation Sovereign Borders was Nick Bryant of the BBC.

In 2014 the National Security Legislation Amendment Act (No. 1) made it a crime, punishable with up to a 10-year prison sentence, to disclose any special intelligence operation, including relating to asylum seekers. This provided little protection to journalists seeking to report on information from whistle-blowers. It caused professional journalists as well as teachers and health professionals employed in these detention centres, to be silenced. Journalists were prevented from entering or reporting and staff members were gagged under draconian employment contracts that prevented them from speaking about anything happening in Australia's offshore detention centre, under threat of a prison sentence. The Secrecy and Disclosure Provisions of the 1 July 2015 Australian Border Force Act ruled that workers who spoke of any incidents from within one of the centres would receive a two-year prison sentence. This was later watered down in amendments put forward by Peter Dutton in August 2017, after doctors and other health professionals had mounted a high court challenge. The amendments would apply retrospectively and stipulated that the secrecy provision would only apply to information that could compromise Australia's security, defence or international relations, interfere with criminal investigations offences, or affect sensitive personal or commercial matters.

In October 2015, Chris Kenny, a political commentator for The Australian, became the first Australian journalist to visit Nauru in over 18 months. While on the island, Kenny interviewed a Somali refugee known as "Abyan", who alleged that she had been raped on Nauru and requested an abortion of the resulting pregnancy. Pamela Curr of the Asylum Seeker Resource Centre accused Kenny of forcing his way into Abyan's quarters to speak to her—a claim Kenny strongly denied. In June 2016, the Press Council of Australia dismissed a complaint regarding the wording of his article and its headline.

In June 2016, a television crew from A Current Affair was granted access to the island and the centre. Reporter Caroline Marcus presented asylum seekers housed in fully equipped demountable units, and provided with their own television, microwave, airconditioning units and refrigerator. In a column in The Daily Telegraph and an interview with ACA host Tracy Grimshaw, Marcus denied that there were any conditions on the crew's visit, and stated that the Australian government had been unaware of the crew being granted visas until after they had arrived on the island.

== See also ==
- Asylum in Australia
- Manus Regional Processing Centre
- List of Australian immigration detention facilities
- Operation Sovereign Borders
- Pacific solution
- PNG solution
- Immigrant health in Australia
