= Perth Immigration Detention Centre =

Immigration detention centre in Perth, Western Australia

Coordinates: 31.932°S 115.956°E

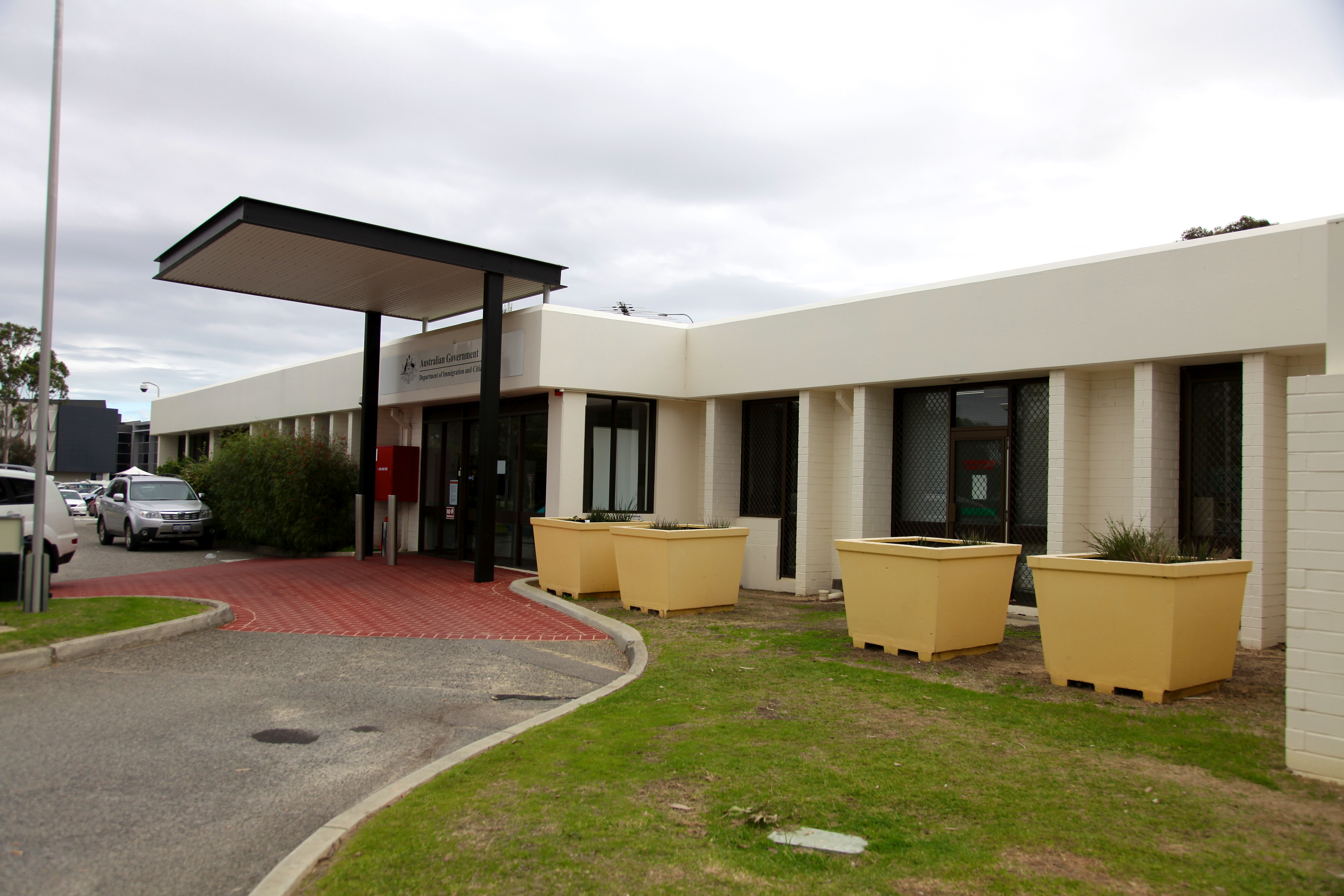
- Interactive map of Perth Immigration Detention Centre
- Location: Redcliffe, Western Australia
- Status: Operational
- Capacity: 55
- Opened: 1981
- Managed by: Department of Home Affairs

Perth Immigration Detention Centre was opened in 1981 and is located near the domestic terminal of Perth Airport, Western Australia.

It contains both a detention centre and residential housing for families. In 2009 it was managed by G4S, a private company, but as of 2019 it is managed by the Australian Government Department of Home Affairs.

== See also ==
- Australian immigration detention facilities
- List of Australian immigration detention facilities
- Mandatory detention in Australia
