= Maribyrnong Immigration Detention Centre =

Immigration detention facility in Victoria, Australia 1950–2018

Maribyrnong Immigration Detention Centre site
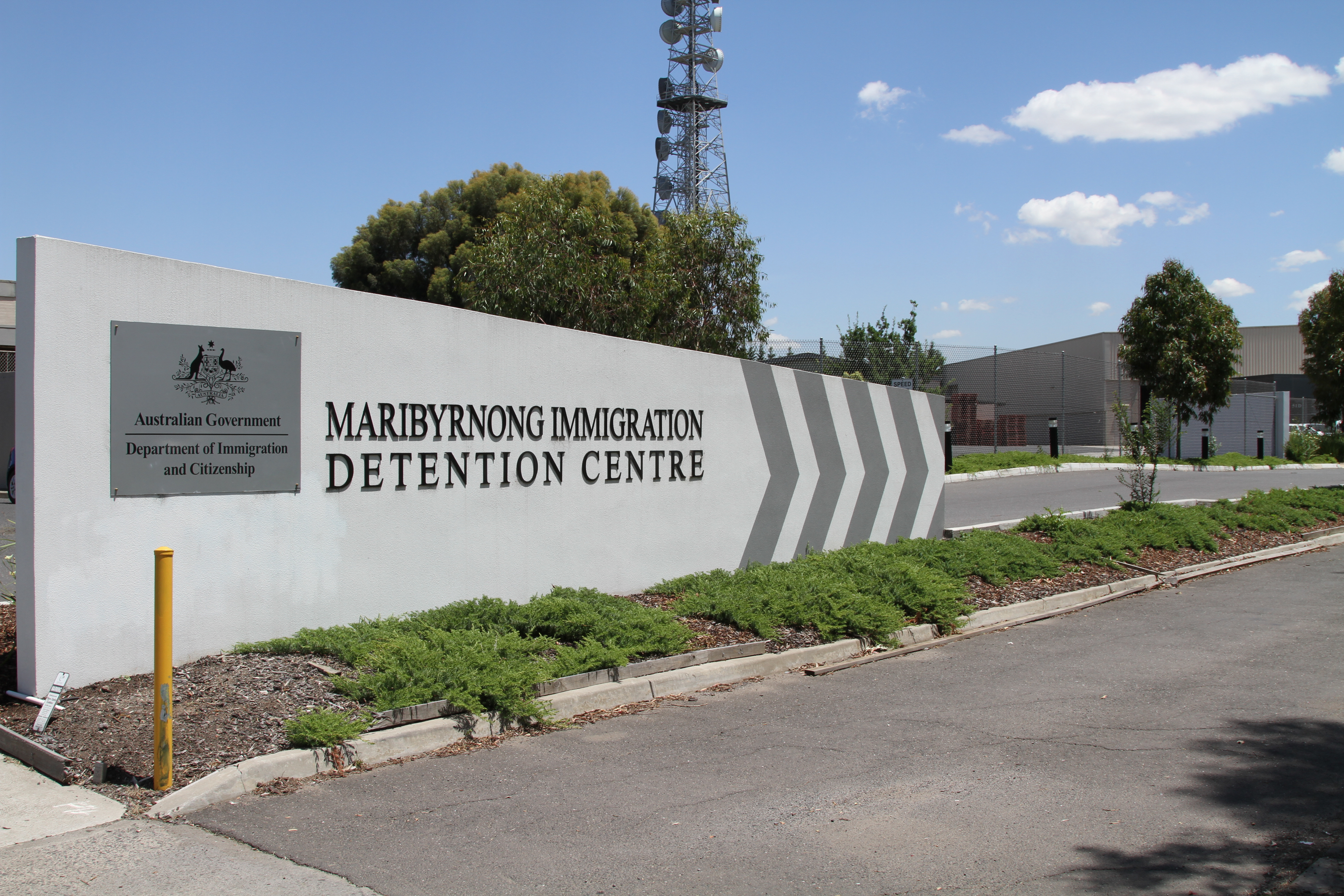
- Entrance sign, 2011, prior to its 2018 closure

- Location within Melbourne
- Former names: Maribyrnong Migrant Hostel; Midway (Migrant) Hostel; Phillip Migrant Hostel; The Student Centre
- Alternative names: Maribyrnong Community Residential Facility

General information
- Status: Completed
- Type: Explosives factory (1942–1945); Transitional migrant housing (1950–1987); Student accommodation (1989–2016); Immigration detention centre (1983–2018); Transitional former prisoner accommodation (since 2020– )
- Location: Hampstead Road, City of Maribyrnong, Melbourne, Victoria, Australia
- Coordinates: 37°46′35″S 144°52′32″E
- Year built: 1942; 1950; 1971–1972; 1983
- Opened: 1942—Factory; 1950—Migrant hostel; 1983—Immigration detention; 1989—Student accomm.; 2020—Former prisoners
- Closed: 1945—Factory; 1987—Migrant hostel; 2018—Immigration detention; 2016—Student accomm.
- Owner: Australian Government

Technical details
- Size: 26 ha (64 acres) (max., 1940s)

Victorian Heritage Register
- Official name: Maribyrnong Migrant Hostel
- Type: Registered place
- Designated: 12 February 2009
- Reference no.: H2190
- Heritage overlay no.: HO135
- Categories: Transient Accommodation; Military

The Maribyrnong Immigration Detention Centre was an Australian immigration detention facility from 1983 to 2018, located on Hampstead Road, in the City of Maribyrnong, in the inner west of Melbourne, in Victoria, Australia.

Prior to its use as an immigration detention centre, the 26-hectare (64-acre) site was the location of a former explosives factory during World War II, and was subsequently repurposed, initially for temporary and transient migrant accommodation—as the Maribyrnong Migrant Hostel and later as the Midway (Migrant) Hostel and Phillip Migrant Hostel, as various structures on the site—between 1950 and 1987. The site was repurposed as an immigration detention facility between 1983 and 2018. Parts of the site were concurrently used by Victoria University for student housing and by community housing providers, as temporary accommodation for those transitioning from correctional centres in Victoria to permanent accommodation.

The former Maribyrnong Migrant Hostel was added to the Victorian Heritage Register on 12 February 2009 in recognition of its historical and architectural significance; and was also added to a non-statutory list by the City of Maribyrnong on an unknown date. The Maidstone tram depot, established on part of the former hostel site from 2023, involved the demolition and removal of some of the heritage items.

== History ==
The history of the site, spanning the adjoining suburbs of both Maribyrnong and Maidstone, covers varied use. Initially used solely for use by the Australian Department of Defence, some of the site remains in the hands of the Australian Government, via Defence and the Australian Department of Home Affairs, other parts of the site have been sold for residential development, and other parts of the site are leased to the Victorian Government for varied uses.

=== Explosives factory ===
Located on the south side of Williamsons Road in Maribyrnong, the Pyrotechnic Division of the Maribyrnong Ordnance Factory was established in 1942, during World War II, to produce fuses, flares, tracers and smoke grenades. The facility included 150 buildings and closed in 1945. Thirteen buildings and some remnant infrastructure including a section of overhead steam supply piping remain from this period.

The former Maribyrnong Ordnance Factory, located to the north, on Williamson Road, continued to remain in use. That site was subsequently divested and forms part of the Maidstone tram depot. A separate 129-hectare (320-acre) heritage site, the former Defence Site Maribyrnong, is located approximately 700 metres (2,300 ft) to the north of the former Maribyrnong Ordnance Factory.

=== Temporary migrant accommodation ===
Maribyrnong Migrant Hostel

Parts of the former explosives site were repurposed to provide temporary and transient accommodation as part of an Australian Government post-war immigration programme to resettle a large number of people from Europe, many of whom were 'displaced persons' whose lives had been disrupted by the war. The first group of post-war migrants arrived at the Maribyrnong Migrant Hostel in 1950. More migrants, mostly British, came as part of government-assisted passage programmes in later years. The assisted migration programmes ceased in 1982.

The former Maribyrnong Migrant Hostel accommodated migrants from almost every national group who arrived in Australia since World War II. Initially these were people from Britain and Europe but the later migrants arrived from Asia and South America and people escaping political upheavals in places such as Hungary, Chile and Vietnam. The hostel at various times also accommodated naval personnel, apprentices and evacuees from Darwin after Cyclone Tracy in 1974.

Migrants were initially accommodated in prefabricated structures, predominantly Nissen huts. The site includes a Nissen and a Romney hut. Nissen and Romney huts were not used in Australia during the World War II but thousands were used in postwar migrant camps. Most of these huts were acquired from the British Ministry of Works and some from private dealers. The first Nissen huts arrived in Australia in 1949. They were replaced with the construction of the Midway (Migrant) Hostel in 1969 and the Phillip Migrant Hostel in 1971, added to the west of the hut facility.

Midway (Migrant) Hostel

The Midway Hostel complex comprises twenty five two-storey accommodation buildings clustered into six groups. The buildings are constructed of concrete metric modular bricks with tile clad skillion roofs. In addition the Midway Hostel also included four laundry buildings, an English language school, a number of detached houses and a childcare centre with grass play areas and sand pits which was built in 1972. The buildings were occupied by Victoria University between 1989 and 2016. The landscape of Midway Hostel is relatively bare and includes a number of scattered rockeries set in polygonal concrete paved 'islands'. The Midway Hostel closed in 1987; repurposed, and was subsequently partially demolished.

Phillip Migrant Hostel

Constructed of concrete metric modular bricks in 1971, the Phillip Centre consists of two concentric rings of two-storey accommodation buildings separated by an internal two-storey walkway. Two accommodation buildings are located together each side of the internal walkway to form a pavilion. The circle is segmented into fifteen pavilions. The roofs are gabled and clad in thin flat concrete tiles. Between each pavilion on the ground floor walkway, small telephone rooms were provided for residents to keep contact with their home countries. On the outside of the ring, between each pavilion, laundry buildings and enclosed drying areas were provided. A landscaped garden was created inside the ring which was planted with native trees and shrubs. The accommodation units either looked out into this garden or out of the ring into the wider landscape.

Some units in the Phillip Centre included kitchens but most of the accommodation units did not have cooking facilities and food was provided in a communal dining room built as part of the late 1970s upgrade. Located above the servery in the dining hall is an illuminated map of the world showing the various time zones. The map also included clock faces showing the time at various places around the world, since removed. This dining room and kitchen were built to replace the former dining room which was an explosives factory building located on Williamson Road. The large central kitchen was also built at the same time to provide food for other Commonwealth Hostels operations. The central kitchen was significantly damaged by a fire in August 2007.

The place contains some remaining structures built for the explosives factory which were subsequently used for various communal and administrative functions by the migrant hostel. These include a number of timber framed fibro and weatherboard clad structures, two brick stores buildings, an infirmary, and a number of reinforced concrete bunkers which were later used for accommodation.

Attempts by migrants to personalise their surrounding are apparent in a mural of windmills and tulips by Dutch migrants painted on the side of one of the surviving concrete bunker structures and a mural of an Asian scene that appears to have been painted by Vietnamese migrants on a section of wall of one of the ammunition stores located next to the Phillip Centre. This building also includes a number of paintings by children on its walls. Staff of the migrant centre also erected a large aviary attached to the former electrical substation that was part of the explosives factory. The Phillip Centre closed in 1986; and was subsequently demolished.

Administrative use

The former Maribyrnong Migrant Hostel was also the headquarters of the Commonwealth Hostels Limited. In October 1951, to assist with the operation of migrant hostels in Australia, the Australian government established a company, Commonwealth Hostels, that operated 64 government-owned hostels around Australia, and ran the hostels as a business, charging a tariff for board and lodging, set according to the migrant's working situation and the size of the family.

=== Immigration detention ===
The Maribyrnong Immigration Detention Centre opened in 1983 at the southern tip of the migrant hostel facilities. The purpose of the centre was to detain people who had over-stayed their visas, had their visa cancelled, or who had been denied entry into the country through international airports and seaports. A report tabled in 2000 stated that the centre had capacity for approximately 80 detainees. The centre was operated initially by ACM, and then by Global Solutions Limited, formerly part of G4S, on behalf of the Australian Government, along with other Australian immigration detention centres. In January 2016 a report revealed that Maribyrnong was the harshest immigration detention centre in Australia, with guards handcuffing and using force against detainees at a far higher rate than in other centres. The Australian Human Rights Commission inspected the centre in March 2017 and released its report identifying significant areas of concern, including calling for the cessation of prolonged and mandatory detention. The government rejected these calls.

The centre closed on 31 December 2018, with the government claiming the centre was no longer necessary as a result of the success of Operation Sovereign Borders.

=== Subsequent use ===
Most of the original Midway Migrant Hostel was sold by the government to the Footscray Institute of Technology (now Victoria University) in 1989 for student accommodation. Named "The Student Village", RMIT University and the University of Melbourne were also partners until Victoria University assumed sole responsibility during the 1990s. The Student Village closed in 2016. It was subsequently partially demolished in 2023 for the construction of the new Maidstone tram depot.

The Phillip Centre became known as the Gilmour Centre and was used for student accommodation until 2001. It was subsequently demolished and redeveloped for private residential housing.

During the COVID-19 pandemic, the former immigration detention centre was used by the Victorian Government initially as a short-term measure, to reduce the risks of virus transmission, and accommodate approximately 40 males exiting correctional centres in Victoria. It later became a more permanent arrangement as the Maribyrnong Community Residential Facility, with residents permitted to stay for approximately three-to-four months. The facility is operated by Corrections Victoria in conjunction with G4S and Jesuit Social Services.

== See also ==
- Defence Explosive Factory Maribyrnong
- Immigration detention in Australia
- List of places on the Victorian Heritage Register in the City of Maribyrnong
- List of Australian immigration detention facilities
- Post-war immigration to Australia
