= Department of Immigration and Border Protection =

Former department of the Australian government

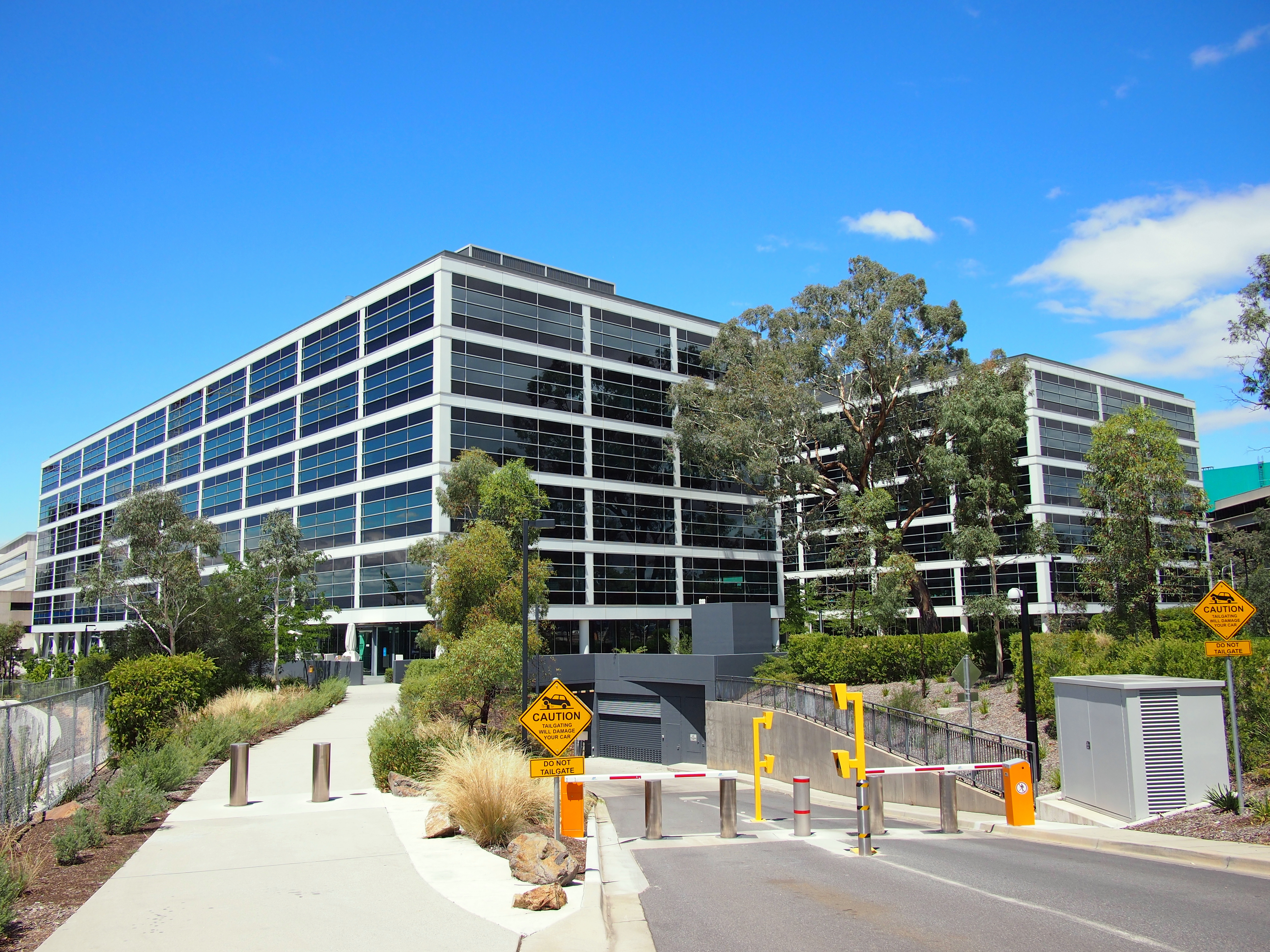
- Head office of the Department of Immigration and Border Protection in Belconnen, ACT.

Department overview
- Formed: 18 September 2013
- Preceding Department: Department of Immigration and Citizenship
- Dissolved: 19 December 2017
- Superseding Department: Department of Home Affairs
- Type: Department
- Jurisdiction: Commonwealth of Australia
- Headquarters: 6 Chan Street, Belconnen, Australian Capital Territory
- Motto: "build Australia's future through the well-managed movement and settlement of people"
- Employees: 8,506 (at June 2014)
- Ministers responsible: Peter Dutton, Minister for Immigration and Border Protection; Alex Hawke, Assistant Minister for Immigration and Border Protection
- Department executive: Michael Pezzullo, Secretary (2014–2017)
- Child agencies: Australian Border Force; Migration Agents Registration Authority

The Department of Immigration and Border Protection (DIBP) was a department of the Australian Government that was responsible for immigration, citizenship and border control (including visa issuance). In 2017, the organisation was subsumed into the Department of Home Affairs, which combines its responsibilities with a number of other portfolios.

The last departmental head was Secretary Michael Pezzullo, who reported to the then-Minister for Immigration and Border Protection, Peter Dutton, and the Assistant Minister for Immigration and Border Protection, Alex Hawke.

== History ==
The Department of Immigration and Border Protection was formed by way of an Administrative Arrangements Order issued on 18 September 2013 and replaced the majority of the functions previously performed by the former Department of Immigration and Citizenship; with the exception of most settlement and multicultural affairs programs that were assumed by the Department of Human Services. Additionally, the Australian Border Force and associated policy was assumed by the Department of Immigration and Border Protection (previously managed under the authority of the Attorney-General's portfolio), a move intended to ensure stronger integration of border protection resources.

Following Federation in 1901, immigration to Australia was handled by the Department of External Affairs. In 1916 responsibility shifted to the newly created Department of Home and Territories. Migration was handled from 1928 until 1932 by a recreated Department of Home Affairs and from 1932 until 1945 by the Department of the Interior, except that between January 1925 and January 1928 Victor Wilson and Thomas Paterson were Ministers for Markets and Migration.

In July 1945, the Department of Immigration was established as Australia launched a massive immigration program following World War II. The then Minister for Immigration, Arthur Calwell promoted mass immigration with the slogan "populate or perish". Since 1945, the department's names, functions and responsibilities have changed several times.

Department name	Abbreviation	Start	End	Reference
Department of Immigration	DI	1945	1974	
Department of Labor and Immigration	DLI	1974	1975	
Department of Immigration and Ethnic Affairs (I)	DIEA	1975	1987	
Department of Immigration, Local Government and Ethnic Affairs	DILGEA	1987	1993	
Department of Immigration and Ethnic Affairs (II)	DIEA	1993	1996	
Department of Immigration and Multicultural Affairs	DIMA	1996	2001	
Department of Immigration and Multicultural and Indigenous Affairs	DIMIA	2001	2006	
Department of Immigration and Multicultural Affairs (II)	DIMA	2006	2007	
Department of Immigration and Citizenship	DIAC	2007	2013	
Department of Immigration and Border Protection	DIBP	2013	2017	
Department of Home Affairs	Home Affairs	2017	present	

The present departmental title, Department of Home Affairs, refers to a combined department covering law enforcement, national and transport security, criminal justice, emergency management, multicultural affairs and immigration and border control. Departmental writing guide mandates the use of "Home Affairs" as a shortened form of the Department's name. DHA is exclusively used by Defence Housing Australia.

Over the years, the department has been the centre of controversy in regards to the Australian Government's policies of mandatory detention of unauthorised arrivals, the Pacific Solution, and the treatment of asylum seekers that was criticised in the Palmer Inquiry reports in 2005.

The Rudd Labor government announced the end of mandatory detention in Australia in July 2008, unless the asylum seeker was deemed to pose a risk to the wider community, such as those who have repeatedly breached their visa conditions or those who have security or health risks.

On 1 July 2015, the Migration Review Tribunal, the Refugee Review Tribunal and the Social Security Appeals Tribunal became divisions of the Administrative Appeals Tribunal.

== Operational activities ==
In an Administrative Arrangements Order made on 18 September 2013, the functions of the department were broadly classified into the following matters:

- Entry, stay and departure arrangements for non-citizens
- Border immigration control
- Citizenship
- Ethnic affairs
- Customs and border control other than quarantine and inspection

=== Migration program ===
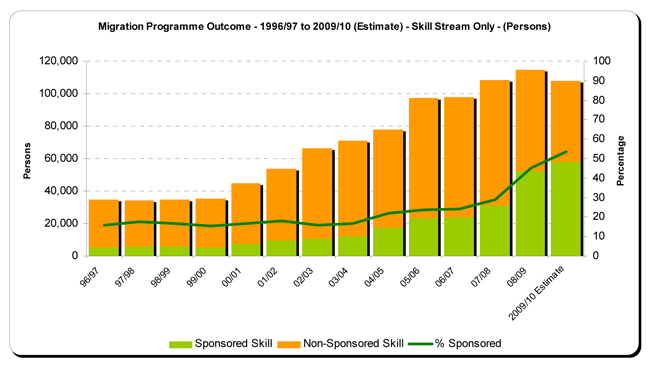
Immigration program outcomes (1996 - 2010)

The size and composition of Australia's permanent migration program is reviewed annually to maximise its potential. The 2010–11 migration program was set at 168,700 places—an overall total which was unchanged from 2009 to 2010. Within this total, the skill stream was allocated 113 850 places to address current and emerging skill shortages in critical occupations and regions. The family stream was set at 54 550 places, recognising the benefits that accrue when Australians have their parents, partners, carers or children join them to live in Australia permanently.

On 1 July 2010, a new skilled occupation list was introduced for the general skilled migration. A new points test emphasising the importance of English language proficiency, work experience and higher level qualifications was announced and implemented on 1 July 2011. In addition, state migration plans were implemented for each state and territory to provide greater flexibility for state and territory governments to nominate skilled migrants in a broader range of occupations specific to their skill shortage needs than are currently offered through the skilled occupation list.

According to the 2014-15 migration program, 68 per cent are skilled migrants and 32 per cent are from family visa streams.

=== Humanitarian program ===
Australia is within the top three humanitarian resettlement countries in the world. Under the humanitarian program, the department granted 13,799 visas in 2010–11. Of these, 8971 were granted offshore and 4828 were granted onshore. The Woman at Risk target of 12 per cent of refugee grants (720 grants) was exceeded, with 759 visas granted.

The introduction of complementary protection legislation into parliament on 24 February 2011, was a development in relation to Australia's commitment to fulfilling its international obligations under the Refugee Convention. This was expected to improve the efficiency of decision-making by providing more accountable assessments of asylum seekers’ protection claims.

=== Citizenship ===
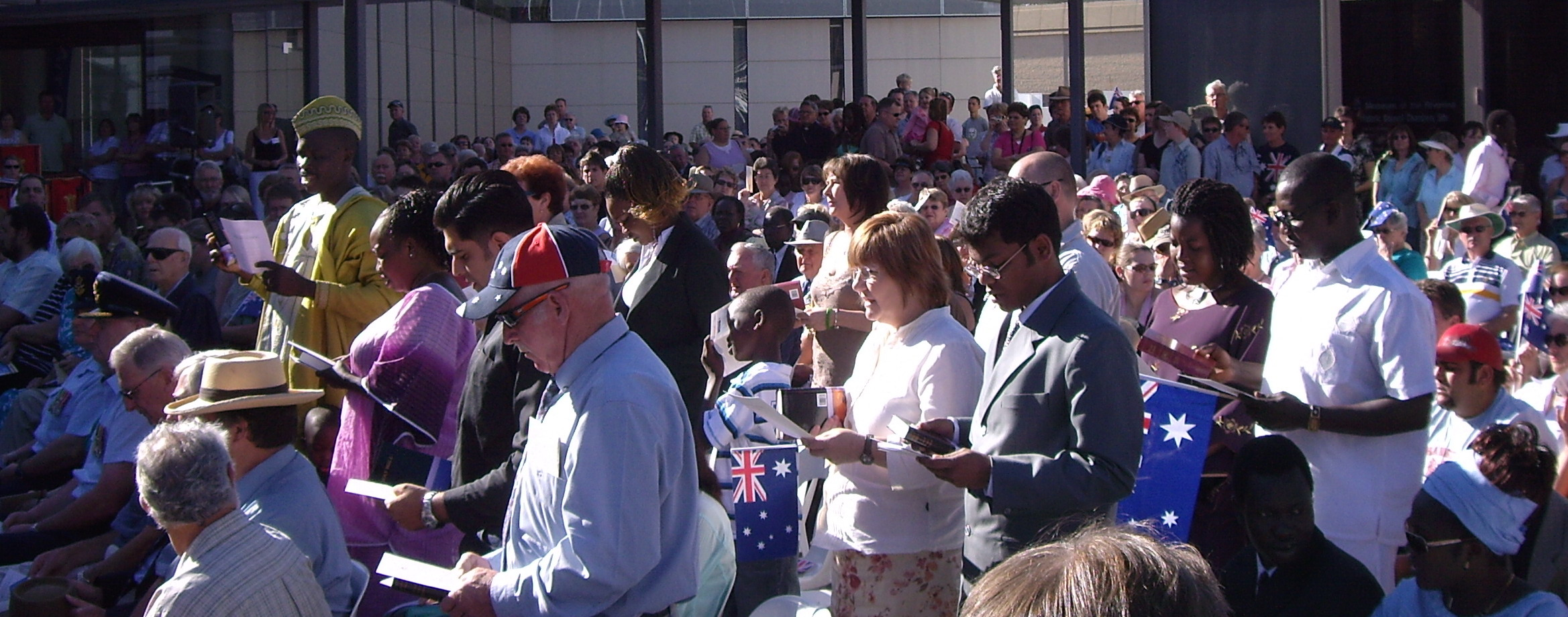
Australia Day citizenship ceremony, 2007

The department's citizenship course provides an alternative pathway for taking the final step towards becoming an Australian citizen. In 2010–11, 27 citizenship courses were delivered across metropolitan and regional areas in Australia, and about 74,000 citizenship tests were administered globally during the year.

On 26 January 2011, Australia Day, approximately 13,000 people became Australian citizens in about 325 citizenship ceremonies hosted by local councils and community groups across the country. Brisbane City Council, despite the devastating floods, hosted the largest Australia Day 2011 citizenship ceremony with more than 1,000 people becoming citizens at the Brisbane Convention and Exhibition Centre.

=== Border security ===
The department collects biometrics to help verify the identity of visa applicants in any future visa encounters. From December 2010, biometrics began to be collected across 15 countries in Africa, Asia, Europe and the Middle East. This initiative was undertaken in collaboration with the predecessor of UK Visas and Immigration.

=== Immigration detention ===
A new immigration detention services group was established in 2011 to implement policy, manage contractors and coordinate detention operations.

== See also ==
- Visa policy of Australia
- List of Australian Commonwealth Government entities
- Migration Agents Registration Authority
- Cornelia Rau
- Vivian Solon
