= Martin Bowles =

Australian public servant

Martin Bowles AO PSM

Secretary of the Department of Immigration and Citizenship
- In office March 2012 – 18 September 2013

Secretary of the Department of Immigration and Border Protection
- In office 18 September 2013 – 13 October 2014

Secretary of the Department of Health
- In office 13 October 2014 – 1 September 2017

Personal details
- Born: Martin Gerard Bowles Rockhampton, Queensland, Australia
- Education: Capricornia Institute of Advanced Education; Griffith University
- Occupation: Not for profit Executive

Martin Gerard Bowles AO PSM is an Australian healthcare executive, and former senior public servant. He is currently the national CEO of Calvary Health Care, and was previously Secretary of the Department of Health (2014–17) and the Department of Immigration (2012–14) in the Australian public service.

== Personal life ==
Bowles resides in Canberra. He is married to Deidre and has two children, Andrew and Morgan.

== Education ==
Bowles has a Bachelor of Business from the Capricornia Institute of Advanced Education and a Graduate Certificate of Public Sector Management from Griffith University. He is also a Fellow of the Australian Society of Certified Practising Accountants.

== Career ==
Bowles has held a number of public roles across the Australian Capital Territory, Queensland and New South Wales. He worked in Health across a number of Area Health Services including his appointment in June 2002 as the Chief Executive Officer of Wentworth Area Health Services, and a term as Deputy Director General of Corporate Services at the Department of Education and Training New South Wales.

In 2006, Bowles joined the ranks of the Australian Public Service, Australia's federal civil service, when he was appointed as Deputy Secretary of the Department of Defence.

Following his time at Defence, Bowles was appointed as Deputy Secretary of the Energy, Safety and Corporate Group at the Department of Climate Change and Energy Efficiency, where he had executive oversight of the Corporate Support Division, the Energy and Safety Programs Division and the Renewable and Energy and Efficiency Division.

At the end of 2012, Prime Minister Julia Gillard appointed Bowles Secretary of the Department of Immigration and Citizenship after he had acted in the position since March 2012. Bowles stayed in the role of immigration head as the department transitioned to the Department of Immigration and Border Protection.

Bowles transferred to head the Department of Health in October 2014. He tendered his resignation from this role as of 1 September 2017, and is currently national CEO for Calvary Health Care.

== Awards ==
Bowles was awarded the Public Service Medal in January 2012 "for outstanding public service in delivering highly the Home Insulation and Green Loans programs." Bowles received an Officer of an Order of Australia in 2019.

Government offices
Preceded by Andrew Metcalfe	Secretary of the Department of Immigration and Citizenship; 2012–2013	Succeeded by Himself as Secretary of the Department of Immigration and Border Protection
Preceded by Himself as Secretary of the Department of Immigration and Citizenship	Secretary of the Department of Immigration and Border Protection; 2013–2014	Succeeded by Mike Pezzullo
Preceded by Jane Halton	Secretary of the Department of Health; 2014–2017	Succeeded by Glenys Beauchamp
