= Stephanie Foster =

Stephanie Foster may refer to:

- Stephanie Foster (politician) (born 1967), American politician from Mississippi
- Stephanie Foster (public servant), Australian public servant
- Stephanie Foster (rower) (born 1958), New Zealand rower
