= Cornelia Rau =

Unlawfully detained Australian immigrant

- Born: c. 1965 (60–61); Germany
- Disappeared: 17 March 2004; Manly Hospital
- Status: Found, alive
- Education: Davidson High School
- Occupation: Flight attendant
- Employer: Qantas
- Known for: Unlawful detention by the Australian Government under the Migration Act 1958 at: Brisbane Women's Correctional Centre (2004); Baxter Detention Centre (2004–2005); Palmer Inquiry (2005)

Cornelia Rau (born c. 1965 in Germany) is a German and Australian citizen who was unlawfully detained for a period of ten months in 2004 and 2005 as part of the mandatory detention program of the Australian Government. Her detention became the subject of a government inquiry which was later expanded to investigate over 200 other cases of suspected unlawful detention by the Australian government's Department of Immigration and Multicultural and Indigenous Affairs (DIMIA).

Rau disappeared from Manly Hospital on 17 March 2004, and, in February 2005, it was revealed that she was unlawfully detained at Brisbane Women's Correctional Centre, a prison, and later at Baxter Detention Centre, after being classified as a suspected illegal immigrant or non-citizen by the Immigration Department when she refused to reveal her true identity.

== Life in Australia ==
Rau arrived in Australia from Germany in 1967, aged eighteen months. Her family lived in Australia until 1980 when they returned to Germany. They lived there for two years, then moved to Asia and once again to Australia in 1983 where they remained. Although Rau is still a German citizen and spoke some German at home, at school and elsewhere she spoke English.

Rau attended an art school and worked in hospitality before taking a job as a flight attendant with Qantas. In April 1998, Rau joined Kenja Communication, a cult, but was apparently expelled from the organisation following a Kenja event in Melbourne.

== Mental illness ==
In October 1998, Rau was hospitalised for three months, after unstable behaviour probably brought on by a Kenja artistic festival. At the time, she was diagnosed with bipolar disorder, but doctors later diagnosed her with schizophrenia. At one point, doctors believed that Rau had schizoaffective disorder.

Between January 1999 and March 2004, Rau was hospitalised several more times after further incidents of unstable behaviour. On several occasions, she disappeared for a few days, and sometimes she travelled overseas, but she had always returned or made contact with her family, usually with her sister, Christine Rau. On 1 December 2003, Rau disappeared, and was reported missing to the police by her family, but she soon returned. Rau was prescribed medication for her condition and was often re-admitted to hospital, but did not like the treatment because of its side effects. Eventually Rau's doctors and her family scheduled a community treatment order hearing for 18 March 2004, which would have compelled Rau to take her medication.

== Disappearance ==
On 17 March 2004, Rau discharged herself from Manly Hospital and disappeared. The following day, Manly Hospital reported Rau to the New South Wales Police as a "missing patient", although they did not consider her to be in any serious danger.

On 29 March 2004, Rau arrived at the Hann River Roadhouse in North Queensland. She was hitchhiking and travelling alone. Since it was the wet season, and she did not have a consistent plan for travel, the locals were concerned for her safety. On 30 March, locals took her from the Roadhouse to the nearby town of Coen, on the Cape York Peninsula. She was taken to the Exchange Hotel in Coen, where locals called the Queensland Police. There Rau gave several versions of her story, identifying herself as Anna Brotmeyer and Anna Schmidt, and spoke both English and German. She said that she was a tourist from Munich, Germany, and that she was planning to continue north as far as Weipa. However, she could not provide any documentation and said there was no one else in Australia who would know she was missing.

On 31 March, Queensland Police contacted DIMIA and gave it the details that Rau had provided. DIMIA said that it had no records of the arrival of any person called Anna Brotmeyer. The police returned to the Exchange Hotel, but Rau had left, and they later found her approximately 15 kilometres (9.3 mi) north of the town, where they ordered her back to the Coen police station. There she gave several different stories about how and when she entered the country, none of them consistent. The police again contacted DIMIA, which advised them to detain Rau as a suspected unlawful non-citizen under the provisions of the Migration Act 1958. Rau was searched, and had a Norwegian passport, a book with two names (both different from Anna and Cornelia) on it, and A$2,413 in her possession. Later that day she was driven from Coen to Cairns.

== Detention ==
=== Queensland ===
On 2 April, Rau was visited by Iris Indorato, the honorary consul for Germany and France in Cairns. Rau communicated with her in German, because officials did not know at the time that Rau could speak English, and it was presumed that she was a lost German citizen. Indorato said that her command of the language was fluent but "child-like" in terms of vocabulary, and that Rau could not remember basic information such as her parents' names, and where she had been born.

On 5 April, Rau was transferred to Brisbane, and to the Brisbane Women's Correctional Centre (BWCC), where she would remain for the next six months. There she was placed among the general prison population, because there are no immigration detention facilities in Queensland. Rau was technically in the custody of DIMIA, although she was in reality being cared for by BWCC and Queensland Corrective Services.

While in prison, Rau was met by Debbie Kilroy, who ran an organisation called Sisters Inside, to support women in prison. Kilroy first met her in early May, when Rau had been without medication for two months. Rau identified herself to Kilroy as Anna, but spoke to her in fluent English with an Australian accent. On several occasions, Rau asked Kilroy to contact DIMIA for her, to ask when she would be released from prison, since she "had done nothing wrong". Other prisoners stated to the media that Anna would try to phone DIMIA but was unable to, because she could not remember who she was. DIMIA's position was that it was Rau's responsibility to identify herself, not theirs.

On 29 April, a DIMIA officer contacted the Missing Persons Unit of the Queensland Police, and sent them the information they had collected about Anna. The Unit said that they had no records matching the descriptions provided. On 11 May, Rau asked if she could apply for a German passport, and DIMIA officials prepared a form filled in with her details, giving her name as Anna Schmidt. Four days later, the German Consulate in Sydney rejected the passport application, because it contained insufficient or inadequate information. On 17 June, DIMIA contacted the Australian Embassy in Berlin for assistance in identifying Rau.

Throughout June 2004, as Rau's condition deteriorated, other prisoners began to suspect that she was ill, because she would pace all day and would slam doors. Kilroy said that she attempted to raise the matter with BWCC officials, but they said that it was a DIMIA responsibility. On 5 July, Anna was one of 25 prisoners interviewed by an Ethical Standards Unit from the Government of Queensland, which was investigating claims of abuse within the prison system. During the taped interview, Anna recalled an incident in which she was sent to solitary confinement in the Detention Unit (DU), for attempting to obtain a newspaper from another room in the prison. During Rau's six months in BWCC, she spent five weeks in solitary confinement in the DU.

On 30 July, after several BWCC inmates and staff expressed concerns about Anna's welfare, the prison's psychologist recommended that she have a psychiatric evaluation, so that her mental health could be assessed. One week later, on 6 August, a BWCC officer also asked for an evaluation, to determine whether Anna could be placed in the community, rather than remain in the prison. Eventually, on 10 August, the prison psychiatrist recommended that she be taken to a hospital for a full assessment, to determine her mental health. Her report noted that Anna's behaviour was unusual, and she had poor hygiene and would behave inappropriately towards the guards, particularly the male ones. Anna was taken to Princess Alexandra Hospital in Brisbane on 20 August, where doctors spent six days assessing her. She was returned to BWCC on 26 August, after doctors failed to diagnose her schizophrenia.

Meanwhile, on 11 August, Rau's family officially reported her as a missing person to the New South Wales Police. The police launched a public appeal, advertising in newspapers and placing posters nearby. On 12 August, NSW police contacted DIMIA, to search their records for information about Rau. The search revealed nothing, and there was no further interstate cooperation. The police contacted DIMIA again six weeks later, on 24 September, in an attempt to discover whether Rau had left or tried to leave Australia. DIMIA replied that she had not left, and was still in the country.

By the end of September 2004, DIMIA officials were planning to move Rau to the Baxter Immigration Reception and Processing Centre (commonly known as the Baxter Detention Centre), a DIMIA facility (operated by Global Solutions Limited, or GSL) near the town of Port Augusta in South Australia. Rau refused to sign the transfer forms, but, on 6 October, she was transferred to Baxter anyway. She had to be sedated and placed in restraints in order to get her on the plane.

=== Baxter ===
Rau arrived at Baxter later that day and was referred to a psychologist there. The psychologist assessed Rau on 7 October, but was unable to diagnose schizophrenia, declaring instead that she had behavioural problems. After she would not communicate with DIMIA officials at her induction interview on 8 October, she was again referred to the psychologist, who assessed her again on 12 October. On 14 October, the psychologist reported that medication would be useless, and that Anna should be transferred to a facility such as the Villawood Immigration Detention Centre in Sydney, which had a female-only area which would be more suitable for Anna. DIMIA did not think this was appropriate, however, and did not transfer Anna, in spite of the fact that the BWCC psychiatrist had noted her inappropriate behaviour around men.

Instead, Rau was sent to the Management Unit, known simply as Management, which the Baxter psychologist had specifically warned was not a suitable long-term solution. Management consisted of solitary-confinement cells, with both the bed and the toilet visible to Baxter staff through the windows. Rau was entitled to four hours each day outside her cell (although not in the company of other detainees), and, whenever she had to be returned to her cell, GSL officers wearing riot gear would forcibly put her into the cell, according to Sister Claudette Cusack.

On 3 November, Rau refused to talk to the psychologist and, on 6 November, was scheduled for an assessment by a psychiatrist, Dr. Andrew Fruckacz, who recommended that she be taken to a hospital. He could not make a certain diagnosis, but he believed that schizophrenia was a possibility, along with a personality disorder. A psychiatrist from Glenside Mental Health Service, a campus of the Royal Adelaide Hospital, was told about Anna's behaviour, and said that her problems were behavioural, and not mental-health related. The Rural and Remote Mental Health Service (RRMHS) offered a videoconference, but Baxter officials instead wanted Anna to be admitted to a hospital, because they believed that she would not cooperate with a video assessment. On 17 November, the RRMHS took Anna off the waiting list for hospital treatment, without informing officials at Baxter, who believed that their request was still being considered.

Despite Dr. Fruckacz's recommendations, Rau was put into Management for a second time. Later, she was moved to the Red 1 compound, specially built to prevent riots and to hold rowdy detainees. There they are separated from the general population, isolated and held indoors for eighteen hours a day.

At a Management Unit meeting on 24 November, Anna's case manager said that she thought that Anna was not German at all but an Australian with German parents. Other staff at Baxter, as well as DIMIA staff in Canberra, were informed of this opinion. Previously, on 12 November, the German Consulate in Melbourne had decided to try to identify Anna. They contacted an officer of the Victoria Police, who, in turn, contacted the DIMIA headquarters in Canberra. DIMIA contacted the consulate on 6 December, but neither had made any progress. Meanwhile, on 22 December, police in Manly, New South Wales contacted DIMIA, without providing photographs or other information, to see if Rau had used her Australian passport to leave the country.

In late December, a group of Christian ministers, including Sister Claudette Cusack, who worked at Baxter, wrote to DIMIA about Anna and other detainees who appeared to have mental-health issues. Father Arno Vermeeren, who also works at Baxter, raised his concerns about Anna and the Red 1 compound with the Immigration Detention Advisory Group (IDAG), shortly before a scheduled inspection. None of these concerns were addressed.

On 5 January 2005, the German Consulate in Melbourne told DIMIA that without information such as fingerprints, they would not be able to identify Anna and, on 14 January, said that officials in Germany had also made no progress. Rau herself contacted the consulate on 20 January, still identifying herself as Anna Schmidt, but staff told her that they still required more information. Consular staff later told Anna's case manager at Baxter that Anna's "child-like" command of the German language was consistent with Anna being an Australian of German background, corroborating the case manager's suspicion from the 24 November meeting. It was noted in the Palmer Inquiry that, at times, Anna would speak English with an Australian accent and, at other times, with a German accent, alongside also speaking German.

Meanwhile, on 4 January, psychologists at Baxter contacted RRMHS again, and Glenside officials finally investigated the information sent to them in November 2004. On 7 January, a doctor from International Health and Medical Services (IHMS), a DIMIA sub-contractor, examined Anna again and suggested that she might have schizophrenia, or at least a schizophrenia-related condition. On 24 January, DIMIA officials in Canberra discussed with Glenside doctors the possibility of committing Anna. The IHMS doctor again tried to assess Anna on 31 January, but he could not get her to cooperate, and, on 2 February, the doctor contacted a psychiatrist at Glenside, who said that Anna should be assessed under the South Australian Mental Health Act 1993 for possible committal. The doctor assessed Anna on the next day and, after consulting with the Glenside doctor, committed Anna.

== Discovery ==
On 31 January 2005, The Age newspaper in Melbourne published a story by Andra Jackson, entitled "Mystery woman at Baxter may be ill". The story was seen by friends of the Rau family, who thought that the woman the article referred to could be Cornelia Rau, so they contacted the family. The family, in turn, contacted the New South Wales Police, who emailed DIMIA officials at Baxter with details and photographs of Rau. Soon, DIMIA staff officially identified Anna as Cornelia Rau. Later that night, South Australia Police officers entered Baxter and removed Rau. She was transported to the nearby Port Augusta Hospital and, on the morning of 4 February, committed to the Glenside Hospital mental health facility.

== Inquiry ==
On 9 February 2005, the Minister for Immigration and Multicultural and Indigenous Affairs, Senator Hon. Amanda Vanstone, announced that Mick Palmer, a former commissioner of the Australian Federal Police, would conduct an inquiry into the circumstances surrounding the detention of Rau—commonly known as the Palmer Inquiry. On 2 May, the terms of reference were expanded to allow Palmer to investigate the wrongful deportation of Vivian Solon to the Philippines in 2001.

Palmer's report was released on 14 July 2005 and Vanstone tabled the report in the Australian Parliament and held a joint press conference with Prime Minister John Howard, in which they apologised to Rau and Solon. Labor Immigration spokesperson Tony Burke criticised the Inquiry, saying that only a Royal Commission would have the necessary powers to investigate the situation properly. Rau stated that she wanted Vanstone to be replaced as Immigration Minister by someone from an ethnic background. In July 2005, and again later in the year, the government promised that Rau would be compensated. In February 2008, lawyers for Rau accepted an increased offer of compensation on her behalf later confirmed at A$2.6 million.

== Current life ==
In May 2008, Rau was cleared to travel by a psychiatrist in Adelaide, but was subsequently "held in isolation at a Hamburg hospital" in a closed ward for 7 weeks until late October 2008. She had been living in Adelaide under the guardianship of the Public Advocate. Her family expressed disbelief that she was allowed overseas travel while also on an authorised "three- to six-month break from her medication".

Rau was arrested while behaving erratically in the city of Tafila, Jordan in February 2009. Local officials say she was taken into custody for failing to pay hotel and taxi bills. The Australian Department of Foreign Affairs says Australian authorities will continue to provide aid to Rau. She returned to Australia on 22 March 2009, accompanied by two medics, her lawyer and Australian Federal Police. She arrived in Sydney then flew to Adelaide where she was taken to Queen Elizabeth Hospital with her nurse and guardian.

== Popular culture ==
Rau was the inspiration for the character Sofie Werner portrayed by Yvonne Strahovski in Stateless, a 2020 Australian television drama mini-series.

== See also ==
- Robert Jovicic
- Stefan Nystrom
- Vivian Solon
