= Palmer Inquiry =

Australian government inquiry (2005)

The Palmer Inquiry was an inquiry led by former Australian Federal Police commissioner Michael John "Mick" Palmer into the unlawful detention of Cornelia Rau, an Australian citizen, suspected of being an illegal immigrant. The report was issued on 6 July 2005 at the request of and to the Minister of Immigration and Multicultural and Indigenous Affairs, Amanda Vanstone.

The inquiry also initially looked at the "Vivian Alverez Matter", an incident with some similarities, which was taken up and completed by the Commonwealth Ombudsman, Neil Comrie.

== Background ==
Cornelia Rau, a lawful citizen, was found to have spent 10 months in immigration detention despite being registered as a "missing patient". This was closely followed by another similar issue, that of Vivian Alverez Solon, who was deported to the Philippines, despite being a lawful citizen, and despite also being registered as a missing person by her family.

== Criticism ==
The incidents received a lot of press and public outrage at the time, with both incidents concerning mental health patients not properly being identified as citizens of Australia. There was a fear that these incidents were not isolated and could happen again. Criticism of the inquiries at inception were that they were of a non-judicial nature, were closed and had limited terms of reference.

== Outcome ==
The inquiry identified a number of shortcomings in the process of arrest and detention, and made a number of recommendations. The Department of Immigration and Multicultural and Indigenous Affairs accepted most of the recommendations though it is not clear if all of them have been implemented.
