= Robert Jovicic =

Robert Jovicic (Serbian: Роберт Јовичић/Robert Jovičić) was a long-time resident of Australia who was deported to Serbia and Montenegro, where he became destitute in 2005.

Jovicic was born on 4 December 1966 in France to Yugoslavian parents. At the age of two, his family migrated to Australia, where Jovicic became an Australian permanent resident and lived for the next 36 years before being sent to Serbia. In Australia, Jovicic became addicted to heroin and turned to crime. By 2004, his criminal record numbered some 158 criminal convictions, mainly for burglary and theft. In June 2004 his permanent residency was cancelled and he was detained, before being deported to Belgrade, Serbia, at the discretion of the then Australian Immigration Minister Amanda Vanstone. The Australian Government only obtained a 7-day visa for him, which meant he was unable to work, and, since he had not opted for Yugoslavian, specifically Serbian, citizenship within 3 years of turning 21 (which was a precondition to maintain citizenship by any of the six Yugoslavia's constituent republics at the time), the FRY authorities declared him stateless.

Jovicic turned up destitute and ill, sleeping rough in freezing temperatures outside the Australian embassy in the Serbian capital, Belgrade, in late November 2005. His case was widely publicised in the Australian media, and there were calls for the Australian Government to reverse its cancellation of Jovicic's permanent residency. Jovicic's legal counsel has stated that he does not speak or understand the Serbian language. Jovicic's father was living in Serbia at the time, but he had his problems (with alcohol) and his relationship with his son was strained, so he was of little help. The Serbian government also had an insufficient welfare system.

In March 2006, Senator Amanda Vanstone announced that Jovicic would be given a special purpose visa and allowed to return to Australia. She promised the family through the then Department of Immigration, Multiculturalism and Indigenous Affairs (DIMIA) that he would be returned and given an RRV (Resident Return Visa). According to his lawyer and others he was also offered access to the new Reconnecting People Package, which is for the reintegration of those wrongly detained (it would seem that if this package was offered it has since been withdrawn). Jovicic returned to Australia on 9 March 2006, but to no certainty about his status. This state of uncertainty continued for almost a year until he was granted a two-year special protection visa on 19 February 2007 by Senator Vanstone's successor as Immigration Minister, Kevin Andrews.

In February 2008, the new Labor Minister for Immigration and Citizenship, Senator Chris Evans, granted a Permanent Resident visa to Jovicic.

== See also ==
- Cornelia Rau
- Vivian Solon
- Stefan Nystrom

== Uncited sources ==
- news.com.au
- http://www.abc.net.au/lateline/content/2005/s1515472.htm
- http://seven.com.au/news/nationalnews/123924
- The Age
- https://web.archive.org/web/20070930184050/http://news.independent.co.uk/world/australasia/article329213.ece
- DPP v Jovicic (2001)
- http://www.abc.net.au/news/newsitems/200603/s1582773.htm
- smh.com.au
- https://web.archive.org/web/20060826065132/http://www.alp.org.au/media/0306/dsiimm100.php
- Jovicic granted reprieve by Immigration Department
- Immigration Media Release
