= Department of Immigration and Ethnic Affairs =

Department of Immigration and Ethnic Affairs may refer to:

- Department of Immigration and Ethnic Affairs (1975–1987), a former Australian Government department
- Department of Immigration and Ethnic Affairs (1993–1996), a former Australian Government department
