= Department of Immigration and Multicultural and Indigenous Affairs =

Australian government department, 2001–2006

Department overview
- Formed: 26 November 2001
- Preceding Department: Department of Immigration and Multicultural Affairs (I) Department of Reconciliation and Aboriginal and Torres Strait Islander Affairs
- Dissolved: 27 January 2006
- Superseding Department: Department of Families, Community Services and Indigenous Affairs Department of Immigration and Multicultural Affairs (II)
- Jurisdiction: Commonwealth of Australia
- Headquarters: Canberra
- Employees: 5,398 (at 30 June 2004)
- Ministers responsible: Philip Ruddock, Minister (2001–2003); Amanda Vanstone, Minister (2003–2006)
- Department executives: Bill Farmer, Secretary (2001–2005); Andrew Metcalfe, Secretary (2005–2006)
- Website: immi.gov.au

The Department of Immigration and Multicultural and Indigenous Affairs (DIMIA) was an Australian government department that existed between November 2001 and January 2006.

== Scope ==
Information about the department's functions and government funding allocation could be found in the Administrative Arrangements Orders, the annual Portfolio Budget Statements, in the department's annual reports and on the department's website.

According to the Administrative Arrangements Order made on 26 November 2001, the department dealt with:

- Entry, stay and departure arrangements for non-citizens
- Border immigration control
- Arrangements for settlement of migrants and humanitarian entrants, other than migrant child education
- Citizenship
- Ethnic affairs
- Multicultural affairs
- Indigenous affairs and reconciliation

== History ==
Originally, this department was formed in the second Howard ministry when the ministerial portfolio of the Department of Immigration and Multicultural Affairs merged with the Department of Reconciliation and Aboriginal and Torres Strait Islander Affairs. Only two ministers have held this department, Phillip Ruddock and Amanda Vanstone, before it was returned to the Department of Immigration and Multicultural Affairs, and the Indigenous portfolio was subsumed in the Department of Families, Housing, Community Services and Indigenous Affairs in the final days of the Howard government.

== Controversy ==
In 2004-2005 the department was responsible for the unlawful 10-month detention of Cornelia Rau, a German citizen and Australian permanent resident as part of the Australian government's mandatory detention program. Rau's detention became the subject of a government inquiry which was later expanded to investigate over 200 other cases of suspected unlawful detention by DIMIA.

The department also ran the Woomera Immigration Reception and Processing Centre, an Australian immigration detention facility near the village of Woomera in South Australia through contract with Australasian Correctional Management (ACM), a subsidiary of Wackenhut Security Corporation. ACM was criticised over various practices, including failing to staff the centre adequately, and concealing evidence of child abuse. The detention centre was the site of riots, hunger strikes, and lip sewing, which included children.

== Structure ==
The department was an Australian Public Service department, staffed by officials who were responsible to the minister for immigration and multicultural affairs and Indigenous affairs, Philip Ruddock (until 2003) and then Amanda Vanstone. The secretary of the department at its creation was Bill Farmer. Farmer was replaced by Andrew Metcalfe in July 2005, after publicly stating that the department would benefit from vigorous organisational review and major cultural change, led by a new secretary.

== References and further reading ==
- Department of Immigration and Multicultural and Indigenous Affairs (September 2004), Department of Immigration and Multicultural and Indigenous Affairs 2003-04 Annual Report (PDF), Department of Immigration and Multicultural and Indigenous Affairs, ISBN 0-642-26094-X
- Department of Immigration and Multicultural and Indigenous Affairs (October 2005), Department of Immigration and Multicultural and Indigenous Affairs 2004-05 Annual Report (PDF), Department of Immigration and Multicultural and Indigenous Affairs, ISBN 1-920996-001, archived from the original (PDF) on 28 February 2012
- Department of Immigration and Multicultural Affairs (October 2006), Department of Immigration and Multicultural Affairs Annual Report 2005-06 (PDF), Department of Immigration and Multicultural Affairs, ISBN 0-97581817 1, archived from the original (PDF) on 12 June 2007
