= Stefan Nystrom =

Stefan Nystrom was a long-time resident of Australia who was deported to Sweden in 2006. He won a landmark decision at the United Nations in 2011, establishing that non-citizens may also have the right to enter a country.

== Life ==
Nystrom was born on 31 December 1973 in Sweden. His mother, an Australian permanent resident, was visiting her parents in Sweden in the late stages of her pregnancy. She arrived back in Australia with Stefan when he was just 27 days old. Since then he lived all his life in Australia, never leaving the country, and he speaks only English. By 2004, aged 30, he had committed a large number of offences (many when a minor under 18) "including aggravated rape of a 10-year-old boy and armed robbery" and was once again in jail for a serious criminal offence.

== Deportation and Federal Court action ==
The Australian Immigration Minister, Amanda Vanstone, under Section 501 of the Migration Act, cancelled his visa in 2004 on the grounds of his bad character, had him imprisoned and sought to deport him to Sweden. However, she was stopped in 2005 by the Federal Court, whose majority judgement (by 2 out of 3) read: "[Mr Nystrom] has indeed behaved badly, but no worse than many of his age who have also lived as members of the Australian community all their lives but who happen to be citizens. The difference is the barest of technicalities" ... "Apart from the dire punishment of the individual involved, it presumes that Australia can export its problems elsewhere".

As an aside to the main point, some controversy was raised by the Federal Court of Australia judges saying "... but no worse than many of his age". However, according to the same court, his crimes included aggravated rape (at age 16) of a 10-year-old child and armed robbery (at age 11), and one judge noted "the appellant is a thoroughly unpleasant man having been convicted of serious and odious crimes". This has been an opportunity for some to castigate judges for being out of touch.

== High Court appeal ==
The Australian Government appealed to the High Court of Australia, where a panel of five judges gave their decision on 8 November 2006 that despite Nystrom having an "absorbed person visa", Senator Vanstone could cancel his visa and deport him on character grounds. Two judges noted that Parliament had left the Immigration Minister with the discretion to decide whether a person such as Nystrom could remain in Australia. Despite this, Senator Vanstone said her department was now "obliged" to detain Nystrom and "facilitate his removal".

Nystrom was re-arrested on 10 November 2006 and held in Maribyrnong Immigration Detention Centre in Melbourne. On 22 December, with the assistance of the Human Rights Law Resource Centre, he petitioned the United Nations Human Rights Committee (UNHRC) to prevent his deportation. The Committee declined his request for an interim measure to halt his deportation while his case was being decided. He was deported on 27 December 2006, arriving in Sweden on 29 December 2006.

It would appear that the High Court decision, and the dissenting Federal Court judge's opinion, was that technically whilst the Immigration Minister has the power to deport any non-citizen on grounds of bad character, she should not do so in Nystrom's case. All three Federal Court judges were unanimous in their criticism of Senator Vanstone in this case.

== UN Human Rights Committee decision ==
In July 2011, after a 4.5 year delay, the UNHRC, which monitors compliance with the International Covenant on Civil and Political Rights (ICCPR), determined that Australia had violated Nystrom's right to enter his own country (art. 12(4)) and his right to family (articles 17 & 23(1)).

In finding that the right to enter one's own country can apply also to non-citizens, Nystrom v Australia "unequivocally establish[es] that an individual may be able to claim protection against arbitrary deportation by a state party even though he or she is not a citizen of that state." Further, there are unlikely to be any circumstances in which expulsion from one's country can be "anything other than arbitrary." Australia has a legal obligation to remedy its breach of the ICCPR and, in the HRC's view, it should allow and 'materially facilitate' Nystrom's return to Australia.

However, in April 2012 the Australian Government advised the HRC that it "respectfully disagrees" with the committee and said that it will not allow Nystrom to re-enter Australia. Barrister Brian Walters, who acted pro bono for Nystrom, stated the Government's decision could damage international relations and that Sweden had originally requested Australia not to deport Nystrom on humanitarian grounds.

== See also ==
Other prominent immigration cases in Australia:

- Cornelia Rau
- Vivian Solon
- Robert Jovicic
