= Andrew Metcalfe =

Australian public servant and policymaker

Andrew Metcalfe AO
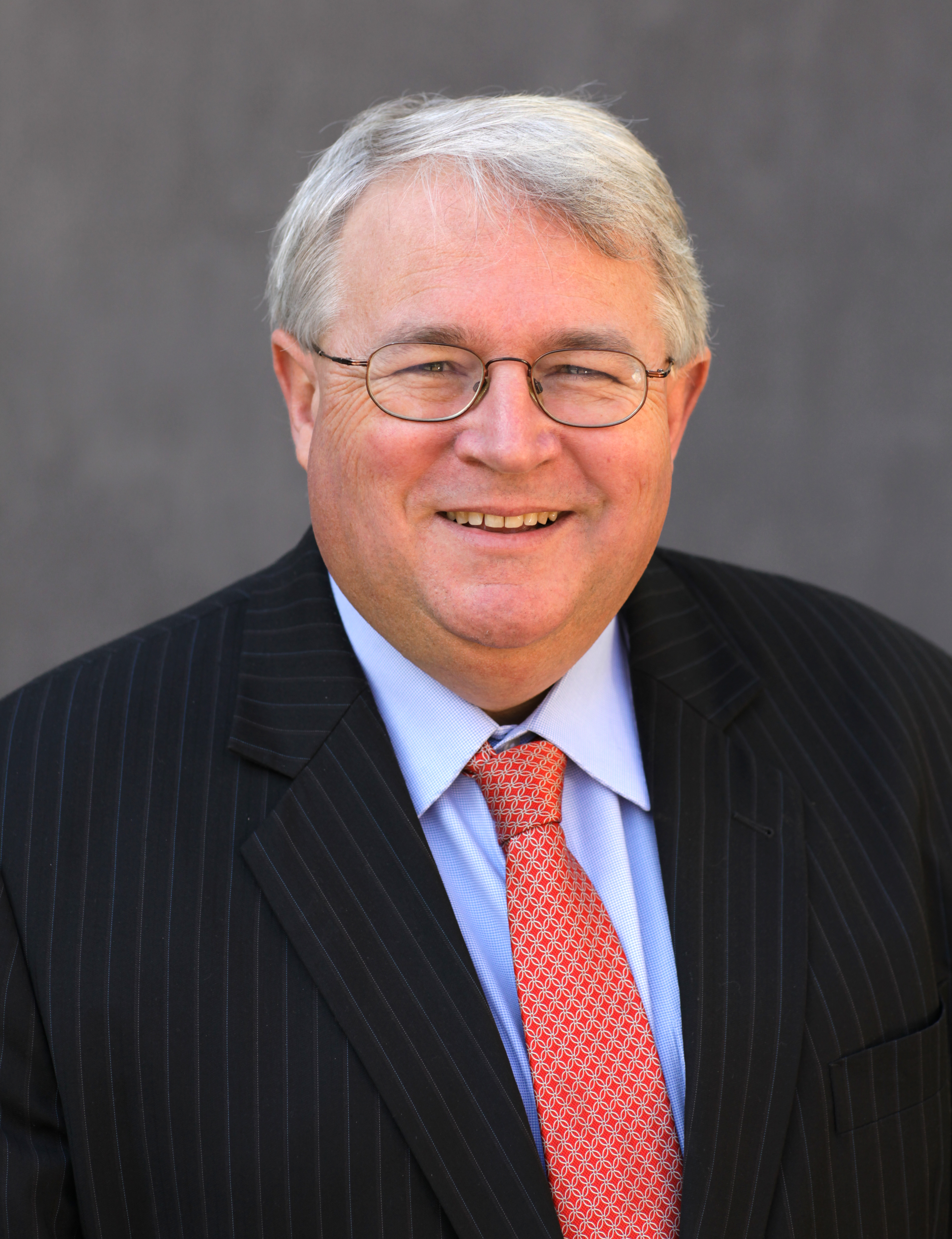

Australian Capital Territory’s Public Sector Standards Commissioner
- In office October 2025 – present

Secretary of the Department of Agriculture, Fisheries and Forestry
- In office 1 July 2022 – 5 August 2023

Secretary of the Department of Agriculture, Water and the Environment
- In office 1 February 2020 – 30 June 2022

Secretary of the Department of Agriculture, Fisheries and Forestry
- In office 29 January 2013 – 18 September 2013

Secretary of the Department of Immigration and Citizenship
- In office 30 January 2007 – 28 January 2013

Secretary of the Department of Immigration and Multicultural Affairs
- In office 27 January 2006 – 30 January 2007

Secretary of the Department of Immigration and Multicultural and Indigenous Affairs
- In office 16 July 2005 – 27 January 2006

Personal details
- Born: Andrew Edgar Francis Metcalfe; 13 October 1959 Toowoomba, Queensland
- Spouse: Jenny

Andrew Edgar Francis Metcalfe, AO FIPAA (born 1959) is a former Australian Government departmental secretary and senior public servant. He was also a partner in EY, the global professional services firm, from 2014 to 2020. He retired from the Australian Public Service in 2023.

Metcalfe is the Australian Capital Territory’s public sector standards commissioner (a part-time role), having been appointed for a five-year term in October 2025.

Metcalfe is also the national president of the Institute of Public Administration Australia (elected in October 2023, and re-elected in October 2025).

He was appointed by the former attorney-general, the Hon Mark Dreyfus KC MP, as the lead reviewer of the Family Relationships Services Program on 15 November 2023, and provided his report on 30 June 2024.

In October 2024 Metcalfe was appointed as a director of the Gardiner Foundation, a not-for-profit company established after the dairy industry’s deregulation in 2000 to advance all aspects of the industry. He was elected board chairman in November 2025.

Having served on the Australian National University’s Audit and Risk Management Committee since late 2023, Metcalfe was appointed as a member of the Council of the ANU for a four-year term commencing 1 July 2025. After the unexpected resignation of embattled former ANU Chancellor Julie Bishop in May 2026, led to the re-organisation of the university leadership, Metcalfe was selected to fill the role of acting Pro-chancellor of ANU.

Metcalfe is also a member of the Research and Industry Advisory Group of the La Trobe Institute for Sustainable Agriculture and Food.

== Background and early life ==
Andrew Metcalfe was born and raised in Toowoomba, Queensland. He attended Rangeville State School and Toowoomba Grammar School and was dux of Toowoomba Grammar in 1976. He then earned a Bachelor of Arts in 1980, and a Bachelor of Laws in 1985 from the University of Queensland.

== Career ==
Andrew Metcalfe joined the Australian Public Service as an administrative trainee in 1980, assigned to the Public Service Board, in Canberra. In 1981, he transferred to the Department of Immigration and Ethnic Affairs until 1989 when in September, he was appointed regional director for immigration, and consul, Australian consulate-general, Hong Kong, until May 1993.

Upon his return to Canberra, he was appointed assistant secretary, Legal Branch at the Department of Immigration and Ethnic Affairs until April 1996. He served as the Chief of Staff to the then Minister for Immigration, the Hon Philip Ruddock MP from April until December 1997, whereupon he returned to the department as a first assistant secretary. He was promoted to deputy secretary and then appointed deputy secretary of the Department of the Prime Minister and Cabinet in August 2002, with responsibilities for the coordination of policy advice to the prime minister on international affairs, national security and machinery of government issues. He was the inaugural chair of the Commonwealth/State/Territory National Counter Terrorism Committee.

John Howard appointed Andrew Metcalfe secretary of the Department of Immigration and Multicultural and Indigenous Affairs in July 2005. Metcalfe stayed on as the Department transitioned, first becoming the Department of Immigration and Multicultural Affairs and later the Department of Immigration and Citizenship. He defended the often-criticised Gillard government Malaysia Solution during his time in the Department of Immigration and Citizenship. During his time as secretary of immigration, he chaired the Commonwealth/State/Territory Standing Committee on Immigration and Multicultural Affairs (2005–12) and of the Five Countries (Australia, New Zealand, United States, Canada and the UK) Conference (2007, 2011).

Metcalfe was appointed secretary of the Department of Agriculture, Fisheries and Forestry, beginning January 2013. He was one of three public service heads relieved of their commissions by the Abbott government after the 2013 federal election.

He was reappointed secretary of the Department of Agriculture, Water and the Environment on 5 December 2019 with effect from 1 February 2020. He served in this position until 30 June 2022, when the department was renamed to the Department of Agriculture, Fisheries and Forestry on July 1, 2022. Metcalfe kept his role and is currently the secretary of the Department of Agriculture, Fisheries and Forestry.

On 13 June 2023, Metcalfe announced his intent to retire as secretary, to take effect on 5 August. He was succeeded by Adam Fennessy.

In August, 2025, Metcalfe was appointed to the council of the Australian National University (ANU).

In May, 2026, the former ANU chancellor, Julie Bishop, resigned ahead of several reports being released to the public regarding controversial leadership decisions and allegations of workplace harassment which had occurred during her tenure. Within the two weeks following Bishop's resignation, four further members of the ANU council resigned as well, all citing issues related to ANU governance and their professed concerns over the oversight of Tertiary Education Quality and Standards Agency in the recruitment of Julie Bishop's replacement as chancellor.

As a result of this sudden need to reorganising top university leadership, Metcalfe was selected to ascend to the role of acting Pro-Chancellor of the university.

== Honours and awards ==
Metcalfe was named the 2010 "Federal Government Leader of the Year", awarded by the Australian Institute of Chartered Accountants.

In January 2012 Metcalfe was appointed as an Officer of the Order of Australia (AO) in the Australia Day Honours List for "distinguished service to public sector leadership through contributions to Australia's international relations and to major public policy development and implementation in the areas of immigration, Australian citizenship, cultural diversity, and national security; and to the community".

In September 2012 Metcalfe was made a National Fellow of the Institute of Public Administration Australia, an organisation of which he was the ACT president from 2009 to 2013. He is also a Fellow of the Australian Institute of Management.

== Public service leadership ==
Metcalfe is a public administrator and public policy expert with extensive experience public service. He transformed the then-Department of Immigration, Multicultural and Indigenous Affairs following his appointment in 2005 as secretary in the wake of the Cornelia Rau and Vivian Alvarez scandals, successfully and positively reforming its culture and operations.

He has worked extensively on the international stage, particularly with the immigration authorities in many countries in Asia; and with Canada, New Zealand, the United Kingdom and the United States when he chaired the Five Countries Conference of immigration authorities in 2007 and 2011.

During his time as deputy secretary in the Department of the Prime Minister and Cabinet, he led the coordination of all policy advice to the prime minister on international affairs, national security, and machinery of government matters, as well as being the inaugural chair of the National Counter Terrorism Committee, comprising federal and state deputy police commissioners and deputy heads of premiers’ and chief ministers’ departments; and senior representatives from ASIO, the Special Operations Command of the Department of Defence, and other Commonwealth departments.

He was also a member of several government boards, most notably as a member of the National Australia Day Council (2002-2012); the Administrative Review Council (2002-2012); and the Council of the Order of Australia (2002-2005). He was the longest-serving president of the Institute of Public Administration (ACT), a White Ribbon Ambassador, the patron of Expand (a public sector organisation for executive assistants), patron of the Gundaroo Bush Festival, and a volunteer technical official for Swimming NSW/ACT. Metcalfe was appointed as a partner with Ernst & Young in their Canberra operation on February 6, 2014, joining its government and public sector team. Ernst & Young's Canberra managing partner, Lucille Halloran, described Metcalfe, in her announcement, as "an inspirational leader with in-depth knowledge of the Australian and international public sectors (who) brings extensive experience and insights about the important relationship between business, the community and governments".

== Board and Council memberships ==
- President of the Institute of Public Administration Australia 2023-ongoing
- Acting Pro-Chancellor of the Australian National University 2026-ongoing.
- Member of the Australian National University Audit and Risk Management Committee 2023-2025
- Member of the council of the Australian National University July 2025-ongoing
- Director of the Gardiner Foundation October 2024-ongoing, and board chair from November 2025
- Member of the Research and Industry Advisory Group of the La Trobe Institute for Sustainable Agriculture and Food (ongoing)
- Chair (and briefly deputy chair) of the National Youth Science Forum 2015-20
- National Australia Day Council 2002–12
- Administrative Review Council 2002–12
- Australian Multicultural Council since 2011
- Council of the Order of Australia 2002–05
- DesignGov 2013
- Strategic Centre for Leadership, Learning and Development 2013
- President of the Institute of Public Administration (ACT) 2009–13
- National Drought and North Queensland Flood Response and Recovery Advisory Board 2020

== References and further reading ==
- Malone, Paul (2006), "Chapter 9: The 'New' Old Broom – Andrew Metcalfe, Department of Immigration and Multicultural Affairs", Australian department heads under Howard : career paths and practice (PDF), Canberra, Australia: The Australian National University, pp. 51–58, ISBN 1-920942-83-1, archived from the original (PDF) on 6 November 2013
- Burgess, Verona (27 November 2013). "Banks Lament policy failures". Australian Financial Review. Archived from the original on 22 February 2014.

Government offices
Preceded by Bill Farmer	Secretary of the Department of Immigration and Multicultural and Indigenous Affairs; 2005 – 2006	Succeeded by Himself as Secretary of the Department of Immigration and Multicultural Affairs
Preceded by Himself as Secretary of the Department of Immigration and Multicultural and Indigenous Affairs	Secretary of the Department of Immigration and Multicultural Affairs; 2006 - 2007	Succeeded by Himself as Secretary of the Department of Immigration and Citizenship
Preceded by Himself as Secretary of the Department of Immigration and Multicultural Affairs	Secretary of the Department of Immigration and Citizenship; 2007 - 2012	Succeeded by Martin Bowles
Preceded by Conall O'Connell	Secretary of the Department of Agriculture, Fisheries and Forestry; 2013	Succeeded by Paul Grimes as Secretary of the Department of Agriculture
Preceded by Daryl Quinlivan	Secretary of the Department of Agriculture, Water and the Environment; 2020 - 2022	Succeeded by Himself as Secretary of the Department of Agriculture, Fisheries and Forestry
Preceded by Himself as Secretary of the Department of Agriculture, Water and the Environment	Secretary of the Department of Agriculture, Fisheries and Forestry; 2022 – present	
