= Bill Farmer (public servant) =

Australian public servant

Bill Farmer AO
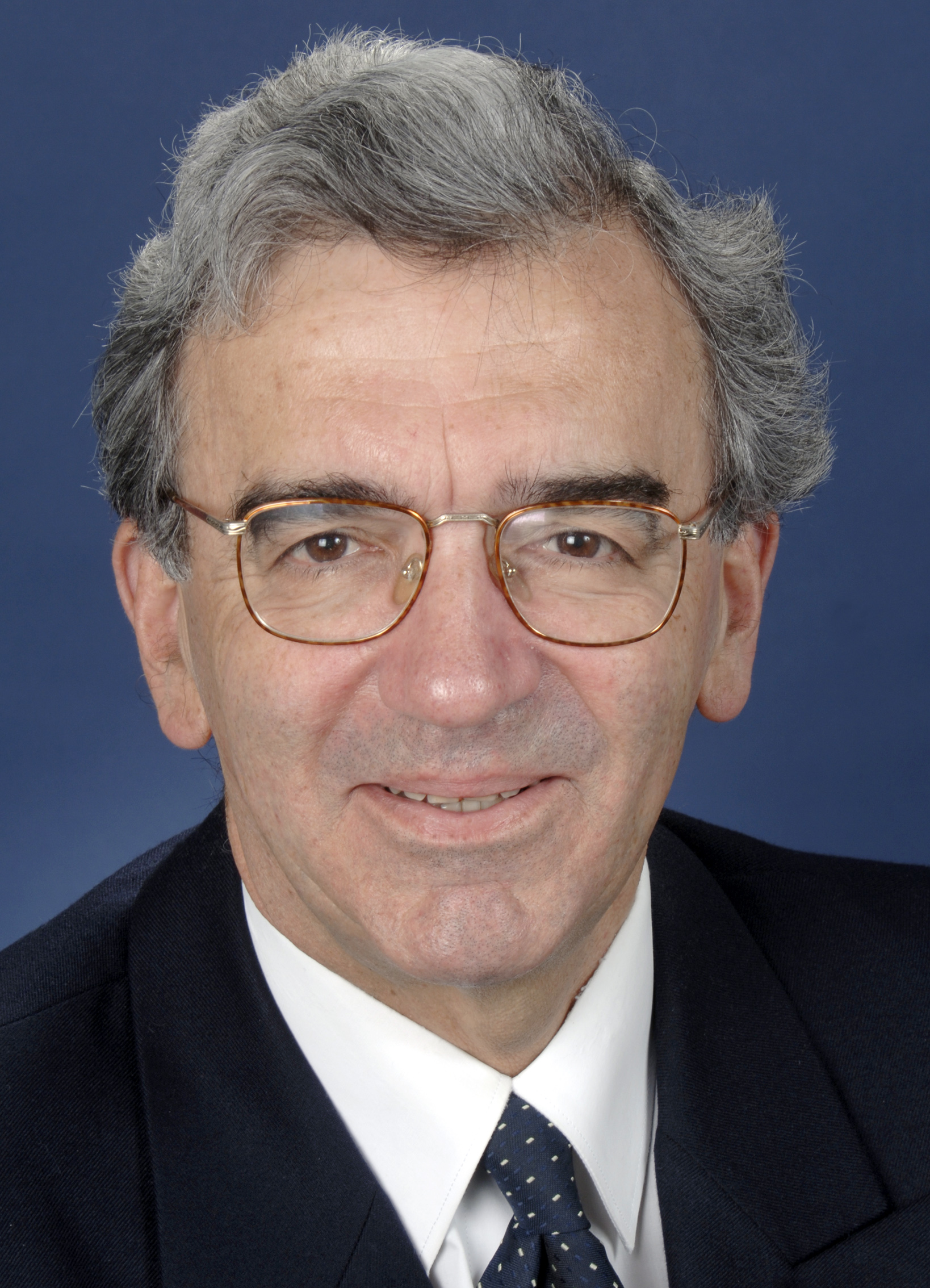

Secretary of the Department of Immigration and Multicultural and Indigenous Affairs
- In office 26 November 2001 – July 2005

Secretary of the Department of Immigration and Multicultural Affairs
- In office 5 February 1998 – 26 November 2005

Secretary of the Department of Reconciliation and Aboriginal and Torres Strait Islander Affairs
- In office 30 January 2001 – 26 November 2001

Personal details
- Born: William John Farmer; 10 June 1947 (age 79) Bishop's Castle, England
- Spouse: Elaine Farmer
- Education: University of Sydney; London School of Economics
- Occupation: Public servant

William John Farmer AO (born 10 June 1947) is a retired senior Australian public servant and policymaker, best known for his time as Secretary of the Department of Immigration and Multicultural Affairs and for his career in the Australian diplomatic service.

== Background and early life ==
Bill Farmer graduated from the University of Sydney with a Bachelor of Arts with Honours and from the London School of Economics with a Master of Science in Economics.

== Career ==
Farmer started his public service career in the Department of External Affairs in 1969. His early Australian Public Service roles saw him serving in Cairo, London, and as Deputy High Commissioner in Suva.

He was Minister and Deputy Permanent Representative of Australia to the United Nations in New York 1984–1987 and Deputy Representative of Australia on the United Nations Security Council 1985-1986.

He was Australian Ambassador to Mexico and the Central American Republics 1987–1989 and negotiated the establishment of diplomatic relations with Cuba, becoming the first Australian Ambassador to Cuba in 1989.

He was Australian High Commissioner in Papua New Guinea 1993–1995. That period saw a radical change in Australian development assistance to PNG, from budget support to project aid; and was notable for efforts to promote a solution to the long- running Bougainville problem.

After a period as Australian High Commissioner in Malaysia 1996–1997, Farmer was appointed Deputy Secretary of the Department of Foreign Affairs and Trade.

Between 1998 and 2005, Farmer was secretary of the Australian immigration department. The department was first known as the Department of Immigration and Multicultural Affairs when he was appointed, and later called the Department of Immigration and Multicultural and Indigenous Affairs. In 2001, he also held the concurrent appointment of secretary of the short-lived Department of Reconciliation and Aboriginal and Torres Strait Islander Affairs.

In 2005 Farmer was appointed Australia's ambassador to Indonesia, replacing David Ritchie. Media saw Farmer's appointment as "something of a reward... after service to the Howard government through many immigration controversies". However, in the post his initial appointment was extended under the Labor government by two years. While in Jakarta, Farmer assisted in negotiations to return a group of 78 Sri Lankan asylum seekers to Indonesia after they were apprehended by the Australian Customs vessel Oceanic Viking. He also helped to send Australian-funded relief aid to victims of the 2009 Sumatra earthquakes.

Farmer retired in 2010. In retirement, he headed an independent review of Australia's live animal export trade, tasked in June 2011 to examine the facilities, treatment and handling of livestock in Indonesia. Farmer made 14 recommendations, including that live animal exporters should be required to ensure their "supply chains" comply with international animal welfare standards. He also served on the High-Level Review of the Australian Aid program 2010–2011, and chaired an Independent Review of the Australian Centre for International Agricultural Research. He was Senior Advisor for the Australia/PNG Kokoda Initiative 2014–2016.

== Awards ==
Farmer was awarded the Centenary Medal in 2003 and, in June 2005, was appointed an Officer of the Order of Australia for service to the community through contributions to Australia's international relations and to major public policy development including domestic security, border systems, immigration, multicultural affairs and Indigenous service delivery. He is a Fellow of the Australian Institute of International Affairs.

Government offices
Preceded by Helen Williams	Secretary of the Department of Immigration and Multicultural Affairs; 1998–2001	Succeeded by Himself as Secretary of the Department of Immigration and Multicultural and Indigenous Affairs
Preceded by Himself as Secretary of the Department of Immigration and Multicultural Affairs	Secretary of the Department of Immigration and Multicultural and Indigenous Affairs; 2001–2005	Succeeded by Andrew Metcalfe
New title Department established	Secretary of the Department of Reconciliation and Aboriginal and Torres Strait Islander Affairs; 2001	Department abolished
Diplomatic posts
Preceded by John McCarthy	Australian Ambassador to Mexico; 1987–1989	Succeeded by Keith Baker
Preceded by Allan Taylor	Australian High Commissioner to Papua New Guinea; 1993–1995	Succeeded by David Irvine
Preceded by John Dauth	Australian High Commissioner to Malaysia; 1996–1997	Succeeded by Bob Cotton
Preceded by David Ritchie	Australian Ambassador to Indonesia; 2005–2010	Succeeded by Greg Moriarty
