= Under Southern Stars =

Patriotic song from Australia

Song
- Composer: Amanda Vanstone

Under Southern Stars is an Australian patriotic song with lyrics written by former Australian immigration minister and Senator Amanda Vanstone. The song is set to the tune of the first of the Pomp and Circumstance Marches by Edward Elgar (or the same as the better-known song set to the same music Land of Hope and Glory).

Vanstone worked on the song for six years as a secret project, before releasing it in early 2007. She stated that the song came about after a discussion with some friends on Australia Day, where it was decided that Australia lacked a song with similar gravitas as the national anthem, Advance Australia Fair. She denied that the song was intended to replace or rival the national anthem, but could be played alongside it, and other classic and modern Australian patriotic songs such as Waltzing Matilda and True Blue at public events.
