= Vivian Solon =

Wrongly deported Australian woman

Vivian Alvarez Solon (born 30 October 1962) is an Australian who was unlawfully removed to the Philippines by the Department of Immigration and Multicultural and Indigenous Affairs (DIMIA) in July 2001. In May 2005, it became public knowledge that she had been deported, although DIMIA knew of its mistake in 2003. Solon's family had listed her as a missing person since July 2003, and until May 2005, did not know that she had been deported. The circumstances surrounding Solon's unlawful deportation have caused much controversy in the Australian media.

In October 2005, a report on Solon's deportation was released following an inquiry conducted by former Victoria Police commissioner Neil Comrie. The report revealed that several senior DIMIA officials in Canberra knew about Solon's unlawful deportation in 2003 and 2004, and failed to act. It also found that Solon's mental and physical health problems were not given proper attention. Solon returned to Australia on 18 November 2005.

== Background ==
Vivian Alvarez Solon was born in the Philippines on 30 October 1962. On 26 May 1984, she married an Australian man, Robert Young, in the Philippines. She then changed her name to Vivian Solon Young. The two moved to Brisbane, Queensland, where Solon was naturalised as an Australian on 3 March 1986. In 1990, the couple separated, and they divorced in 1993. After the divorce, she changed her name back to Vivian Alvarez Solon.

Between 1995 and 2000, Solon received treatment for mental health issues. She was diagnosed as suffering from a paranoid psychotic condition, which affected her behaviour. During this time she developed a minor criminal record with the Queensland Police, and was at one point taken into protective custody by police in Brisbane, who were worried about the effects of her mental condition. On one occasion, her fingerprints were recorded and entered into the national law enforcement database, CrimTrac.

== Deportation from Australia ==
According to a police report, Solon had left her five-year-old son at the Brisbane City Hall childcare facility on 16 February 2001, but did not return to pick him up. Queensland Premier, Peter Beattie revealed on 6 May 2005, that her son, by then nine, has been in foster care since.

At 11:47pm on the night of 30 March, ambulance services were called to a park in Lismore, in the far north of New South Wales. They found Solon next to an open drain in the park, suffering from head injuries. She also had difficulty moving her legs. She had most likely sustained these injuries after falling into the drain, although some media reports speculated that she had been in a car accident. To this day she claims she was knocked off a pushbike by a passing car, but the medical view has always been that she was physically assaulted. She was taken to Lismore Base Hospital, where she was treated for her injuries. She was soon moved to the psychiatric ward because she was behaving aggressively towards hospital staff, presumably due to her head injuries. A social worker Guing Coop who visited Solon at the hospital identified that she was of Filipino background, and suspected that she was an illegal immigrant. On this basis the social worker contacted the local branch of the Department of Immigration, Multicultural and Indigenous Affairs.

DIMIA officers first interviewed Solon on 3 May 2001. According to the Comrie report, the officers presumed that Solon was an illegal immigrant, and did not do proper background checks. On 12 July, Solon was transferred from the hospital to DIMIA custody, and taken to a motel in Brisbane. She told the officials that she was an Australian citizen, and did not want to leave the country, however she was ignored. On 17 July, Queensland Police officially listed Solon as a missing person, several months after she had failed to collect her son from childcare. However, this information was not picked up by DIMIA.

A representative from the Philippines consulate in Brisbane visited Solon on 18 July. In the meeting Solon said that she had been married to an Australian man, a Mr Young, but this information was not passed on to DIMIA. The consulate refused to issue Solon with travel documents, because they did not consider her fit enough to travel (she was in a wheelchair at the time), and so DIMIA arranged for a different doctor to visit her. This doctor declared her fit to fly, and signed the medical certificate allowing Solon to be deported. On 20 July Solon was escorted onto a plane by Queensland Police, and flown to Manila. Handed over to Qantas ground staff at the airport, she was eventually taken to a hospice run by the Catholic Church.

== Discovery ==
In July 2003, the Missing Persons Bureau in Queensland contacted DIMIA with an enquiry about Solon, who had been listed as a missing person for two years. Two DIMIA officers in Canberra conducted searches of records, and made a match between Vivian Solon (as she was known to the missing persons authorities) and Vivian Alvarez (as she was known to DIMIA – Alvarez is her middle name). They told their supervisor (referred to in the Comrie Report as officer 'A') on 14 July that an Australian citizen had been deported, but the supervisor did nothing.

On 20 August 2003, an episode of the television program Without A Trace was aired, which contained a Crime Stoppers segment, with information about Solon and her photograph, at the conclusion of the program. One of the officers in Canberra (referred to in the Comrie Report as officer 'E') again told the supervisor, who again did nothing. At the same time, a DIMIA officer in Brisbane who had worked on Solon's case in 2001 also saw the Crime Stoppers segment, and informed her supervisor. That supervisor also did nothing.

Officer 'E' decided to approach the Missing Persons Bureau directly. In September 2003, the Bureau approached the Department of Foreign Affairs and Trade (DFAT) for help in searching for Solon. DFAT informed the Bureau that Solon had traveled to the Philippines. Eventually Solon's former husband, Robert Young, was informed where Solon was. Throughout early 2004, Young persisted in questioning the Bureau, until it eventually decided to contact DIMIA. The Bureau was put through to officer 'A' in Canberra (who had already been told twice of Solon's unlawful deportation). Officer 'A' then contacted the Brisbane office, and learned that other people there knew about the error made. However again no action was taken, and the Minister for Immigration at the time, Philip Ruddock, was not informed.

On 4 April 2005, Young contacted the new Minister for Immigration, Senator Amanda Vanstone, directly. Vanstone's office inquired into the case, and discovered what had happened to Solon. Solon's DIMIA case file was not stored with the normal case files, and was instead found separately, in the desk of one of officer 'A's subordinates. Vanstone then ordered the Australian Federal Police (AFP), in cooperation with the National Bureau of Investigation (NBI) in the Philippines, to locate Solon. NBI chief Ricardo Diaz reported on Lateline on 6 May 2005, that their search was unsuccessful after three weeks. Mr Diaz also claimed that the AFP was not forthcoming with information to locate Ms Solon.

While watching the news on ABC Asia Pacific, Catholic priest Father Mike Duffin, an Australian from Saint Vincent's Parish Church, watched reports about the hunt for Vivian Solon and wondered if the reports may have referred to a Vivian that was brought to the Mother Teresa Sisters, Missionaries of Charity, in Olongapo City by Australian representatives four years ago. He recognised her from the photo that was used in the report. Father Duffin was surprised that the Australian Government was unaware of her location. Duffin said:

"They are the ones who told her before she left Australia she was coming to the mission, coming to Mother Teresa Sisters, and then when they brought her, they left her at the Mother Teresa Sisters, Missionaries of Charity."

"So I find it very hard that they don't know where they left her, do they have no records or do people forget things as soon as they do them?"

However, Senator Vanstone disputed Father Duffin's claims of prior knowledge by the Australian Government. She informed the media on 12 May 2005 that immigration records had no mention of Ms Solon being brought to a convent. Instead, her records showed that she was met at the airport by a woman from the Overseas Workers Welfare Administration. Ms Vanstone also revealed that the files also showed that there was mention of a discussion with Solon on the possibility of her making contact with some nuns.

Following identification of Vivian Solon at the Mother Teresa Sisters, Missionaries of Charity, the Australian Government sent consular officials to confirm her identity. Senator Vanstone announced that if Ms Solon wished to return to Australia, the Australian Government would provide assistance for her to do so. There was speculation in the media that Solon did not want to return to Australia.

== Media controversy ==
An anonymous senior immigration official reported to Lateline that Solon's situation was due to a systemic problem in the Department of Immigration and Multicultural and Indigenous Affairs. Lateline reported that the official said:

"In the compliance area, people on the whole are a bunch of cowboys, under so much pressure to deport people. All proper processes have broken down. They put their energy into picking up people and deporting them without proper investigation."

The social worker who was one of the last people given access to Ms Solon before her deportation said she had requested from Immigration the grounds for Solon's deportation.

"This one, it just really baffled me because they said they couldn't find any paperwork or documentation about her."

While being escorted back to Manila by Australian Embassy officials on 13 May 2005, Ms Solon revealed that she was unaware that she had been deported. According to Solon, she was informed by Australian officials that she had to be sent to Philippines for treatment, and received travel assistance from them. She also indicated that she had informed Immigration Officers that she had an Australian passport, but was not carrying it at that time.

Lateline confirmed with the Department of Foreign Affairs and Trade on 14 May 2005 that Ms Solon had been issued a passport, valid at the time she was deported. Since Ms Solon has been an Australian, she was issued three passports, and had traveled on an Australian passport for ten years. Her last passport was issued in November 2000, but never collected.

== Comrie inquiry ==
The Solon case was initially referred to the Palmer Inquiry, which was set up to inquire into the unlawful detention of Cornelia Rau in an immigration facility. Senator Vanstone decided that the case should be inquired into separately, and instructed the Commonwealth Ombudsman, Professor John McMillan, to hold an investigation. The Ombudsman appointed Neil Comrie, former Commissioner of the Victoria Police, to conduct the investigation.

=== Criticism of the inquiry ===
The decision to hold a non-judicial inquiry was criticised by certain groups, who did not believe that it had sufficient powers to compel witnesses to testify. Dr Sev Ozdowski, a commissioner on the Human Rights and Equal Opportunity Commission, called for a Royal Commission into Solon's case, saying:

"It certainly warrants an open inquiry which can get all of the facts, it warrants an inquiry which would allow witnesses to come forward, which would provide protection to witnesses and it warrants an inquiry which will have access to all relevant documents.
"So, it could be a judicial inquiry, it could be a Royal Commission, it could be some other form of inquiry but it's important that it's an independent inquiry with access to both witnesses and information."

Premier of Queensland Peter Beattie had also written to Prime Minister John Howard calling for a Royal Commission into Solon's deportation, and the detention of Cornelia Rau. According to Beattie, the framework of the Palmer inquiry did not provide sufficient legal protection, leading to the refusal of twelve Corrective Services staff to give testimony.

On 12 May 2005, Australian Democrats Senator Andrew Bartlett, with the support of the Australian Greens and the Australian Labor Party (ALP), initiated a debate in the Australian Senate for a judicial inquiry or Royal Commission into the operation and administration of mandatory detention, deportation and enforcement. The government expressed a belief that was not necessary to rush into a judicial inquiry then, as the facts of the matters had not been determined by the Palmer Inquiry.

=== Report of the inquiry ===
The report was completed on 26 September 2005, and was released on 6 October. The report was strongly critical of DIMIA, concluding that a combination of incompetence, inadequate training, improper data systems and poor management led to Solon's deportation. The report found that DIMIA had not investigated Solon's case properly before it decided to deport her. The only evidence in Solon's file which seemed to indicate that she was not legally in Australia was a handwritten note, which was not dated or signed by anyone, which stated:

"Smuggled into Australia as a sex slave. Wants to return to the Philippines. Has been physically abused."

The inquiry concluded that DIMIA officials had simply acted on unfounded assumptions about Solon, rather than discovering real evidence. They assumed that Solon's surname was Alvarez (actually her middle name) and conducted their initial searches based on this name. As such, they found no record of her. There were eleven different spellings used by various officials, which also led to confusion. The initial investigation did not take into account the fact that Solon had been treated in the psychiatric ward in Lismore, which might have explained inconsistencies in evidence she gave to DIMIA officials.

Some key recommendations of the inquiry were:

- that the negative culture in the Compliance division of DIMIA be redressed;
- that DIMIA should review its information systems;
- that all staff should be instructed to take more care when performing their duties, and not act on the basis of assumptions;
- that all immigration detainees should be provided with adequate healthcare services.

The report also reaffirmed a number of the recommendations of the Palmer inquiry.

=== Response to the report ===
Following the release of the report, Senator Vanstone announced that A$50.3 million would be spent on a College of Immigration, Border Security and Compliance in order to train DIMIA staff. A$17.9 million would also be spent on improving healthcare services at immigration facilities.

Labor spokesperson for immigration, Tony Burke called for Senator Vanstone to take responsibility for Solon's deportation, under the doctrine of ministerial responsibility. However, Vanstone refused to resign, saying that the general presumption was that ministers should not be responsible for things they did not know about. She also said:

"I'm thinking of trying to buy the copyright on Elton John's song 'I'm Still Standing', but I don't want to tempt fate. So I'll just play it to myself quietly at night."

=== Compensation claims ===
Before Ms Solon's return to Australia, there was speculation in both the media and in the legal community about the possibility of a compensation claim being brought by her against the Commonwealth Government and/or the Department of Immigration.

Sydney-based lawyer George Newhouse brought a legal team together including former Federal Court Judge and Human Rights and Equal Opportunity Commission president Marcus Einfeld Q.C. and lawyer Harry Freedman, who travelled to Manila to discuss legal options with the Solon family.

Terry O'Gorman, President of the Australian Council for Civil Liberties defended the urgency of legal action. He said:

Only the Federal Government having to pay out money and having to defend a court case will bring home to the Federal Immigration Minister, and the Prime Minister, that rights and principles are there to be observed. Criticism of this government over its immigration policy is simply waived away; only when they have to pay money will they sit up and take notice.

On Solon's return to Australia on 18 November 2005, Marcus Einfeld Q.C. confirmed that her compensation would be determined by retired High Court Judge Sir Anthony Mason after she and her legal team had reached agreement on the form of a private arbitration. As part of the deal the Commonwealth Government confirmed that it would care for Solon until the arbitration process was completed.

On 30 November 2006, Mason awarded Solon a compensation payout, reported by The Age newspaper as A$4.5 million, although the Australian Government refused to confirm the amount, citing privacy reasons.

== Timeline ==
=== 2000 ===
- 24 November 2000 – The Department of Foreign Affairs and Trade issues Solon her third passport. It is never collected.

=== 2001 ===
- 16 February 2001 – Solon leaves her son at a childcare facility in Brisbane but does not return to pick him up.
- 31 March 2001 – Solon is discovered suffering from head injuries in a park in Lismore, northern New South Wales. Hospital staff could not confirm her identity, and she was brought to the attention of DIMIA officers.
- 3 May 2001 – DIMIA conducts first interview with Solon.
- 17 July 2001 – The Queensland Department of Family Services reports Vivian Solon as a missing person to the Queensland Police.
- 20 July 2001 – Solon is deported from Australia to Manila. Qantas ground staff take her to the Overseas Workers Welfare Association.
- September 2001 – Solon is admitted into the ward for the destitute and the dying at the Mother Teresa Sisters, Missionaries of Charity.

=== 2003 ===
- July 2003 – Following a query from the Queensland Police Missing Persons Bureau, two DIMIA officers finally match the name "Vivian Alvarez" to the database record for "Vivian Solon Young". They inform their manager that an Australian citizen may have been unlawfully deported, but no further action is taken.
- 20 August 2003 – A missing persons bulletin featuring Vivian Solon is shown after the TV program Without a Trace. Ms Solon is recognised by several DIMIA officers involved in her 2001 deportation, who report the situation to their managers. Once again, nothing further is done to resolve the matter.

=== 2005 ===
- 8 May 2005 – Australian priest, Father Mike Duffin recognises Solon's story from a news program on ABC Asia Pacific
- 11 May 2005 – Senator Kerry Nettle (with the support of the ALP and Australian Democrats) moves a motion to censure Senator Vanstone over the failure to inform family members of the missing persons match in 2003.
- 12 May 2005 – Vivian Solon reunited with her sister, Cecile Solon.
- 13 May 2005 – Solon escorted back to Manila by Australian Embassy officials to receive medical attention
- 13 May 2005 – The Department of Foreign Affairs and Trade confirms that Solon held an Australian passport at the time of her deportation.
- 14 July 2005 – Report on the Inquiry into the Circumstances of the Immigration Detention of Cornelia Rau (the Palmer Report) released. Primarily dealing with the Cornelia Rau case, the report also contains preliminary comments and findings regarding the Solon case.
- 6 October 2005 – Report on the Inquiry into the circumstances of the Vivian Alvarez matter (the Comrie Report) released.
- 18 November 2005 – Solon returns to Australia and is compensated by the Australian government in the form of a care package.

=== 2006 ===
- 30 November 2006 – Solon is awarded a compensation package by the Australian government, believed to be A$4.5 million.

== See also ==
Other prominent immigration cases in Australia:

- Cornelia Rau
- Robert Jovicic
- Stefan Nystrom
