= Department of Reconciliation and Aboriginal and Torres Strait Islander Affairs =

Australian government department, 2001

Department overview
- Formed: 30 January 2001
- Preceding Department: Department of the Prime Minister and Cabinet – the Office of Indigenous Policy
- Dissolved: 26 November 2001
- Superseding Department: Department of Immigration and Multicultural and Indigenous Affairs
- Jurisdiction: Commonwealth of Australia
- Headquarters: Barton, Canberra
- Ministers responsible: Philip Ruddock, Minister; Chris Gallus, Parliamentary Secretary to the Minister
- Department executives: Bill Farmer, Secretary; Peter Vaughan, Executive Coordinator

The Department of Reconciliation and Aboriginal and Torres Strait Islander Affairs was an Australian government department that existed between January and November 2001, concerned with the Aboriginal and Torres Strait Islander peoples and the government policy of reconciliation in Australia.

== History ==
When it was established in January 2001, the department incorporated many of the functions of the former Office of Indigenous Policy in the Department of the Prime Minister and Cabinet. The department was short-lived, when it was abolished in November 2001 its functions were amalgamated into the Department of Immigration and Multicultural and Indigenous Affairs as the Office of Aboriginal and Torres Strait Islander Affairs.

== Scope ==
Information about the department's functions and government funding allocation could be found in the Administrative Arrangements Orders, the annual Portfolio Budget Statements and in the Department's annual report.

The department was responsible for Aboriginal and Torres Strait Islander affairs including the government policy of reconciliation in Australia. Functions of the Department included:

- Developing and evaluating policy affecting Indigenous Australians
- Providing services and programs to Indigenous peoples
- Liaising with Indigenous leaders and providing advice to the Minister on Indigenous issues
- Providing advice on Indigenous reconciliation
- Providing advice on the social and economic position of Indigenous peoples
- Providing advice on land and resource matters
- Providing advice on litigation involving the Commonwealth
- Providing advice on international Indigenous matters

== Structure ==
The Department was an Australian Public Service department, staffed by officials who were responsible to the Minister for Reconciliation and Aboriginal and Torres Strait Islander Affairs.
