= Chris Conybeare =

Australian public servant

Secretary of the Department of Immigration and Ethnic Affairs
- In office 24 March 1993 – 11 March 1996

Secretary of the Department of Immigration, Local Government and Ethnic Affairs
- In office 1 April 1990 – 24 March 1993

Personal details
- Born: Christopher Conybeare
- Occupation: Public servant

Christopher Conybeare is a retired Australian senior public servant.

== Career ==
He was educated at North Sydney Boys High School and Sydney University. He is the son of Judge Theo Conybeare.

Conybeare began his Commonwealth Public Service career in 1965 at the Department of External Affairs (later Foreign Affairs). There he held various positions, including postings in London, Bonn and Manila. In 1980 Conybeare joined the Department of the Prime Minister and Cabinet.

Conybeare was appointed Secretary of the Department of Immigration, Local Government and Ethnic Affairs (later Immigration and Ethnic Affairs) in 1990. He remained Permanent Head of the Immigration department until 1996, when he was one of six Secretaries removed from their roles by the newly elected Howard government.

== References and further reading ==
- Schroder, Philippa (9 December 1995). "Walking the talk: A new breed of leader in the Australian Public Service". The Canberra Times.

Government offices
Preceded by Himself as Secretary of the Department of Immigration, Local Government and Ethnic Affairs	Secretary of the Department of Immigration and Ethnic Affairs; 1993 – 1996	Succeeded by Helen Williams as Secretary of the Department of Immigration and Multicultural Affairs
Preceded by Ron Brown	Secretary of the Department of Immigration, Local Government and Ethnic Affairs; 1990 – 1993	Succeeded by Himself as Secretary of the Department of Immigration and Ethnic Affairs
