= Department of Immigration and Multicultural Affairs (2006–07) =

Australian government department, 2006–2007

Department overview
- Formed: 27 January 2006
- Preceding Department: Department of Immigration and Multicultural and Indigenous Affairs
- Dissolved: 30 January 2007
- Superseding Department: Department of Immigration and Citizenship
- Jurisdiction: Commonwealth of Australia
- Headquarters: Canberra
- Employees: 6,473 (average staffing level for 2005–06)
- Minister responsible: Amanda Vanstone, Minister
- Department executive: Andrew Metcalfe, Secretary
- Website: immi.gov.au

The Department of Immigration and Multicultural Affairs (also called DIMA) was an Australian government department that existed between January 2006 and January 2007. It succeeded the Department of Immigration and Multicultural and Indigenous Affairs, which had been in place since 2001. It was the second so-named Australian Government department.

== Scope ==
Information about the department's functions and government funding allocation could be found in the Administrative Arrangements Orders, the annual Portfolio Budget Statements, in the department's annual reports and on the department's website.

According to the Administrative Arrangements Order made on 11 March 1996, the department dealt with:

- Entry, stay and departure arrangements for non-citizens
- Border immigration control
- Arrangements for the settlement of migrants and humanitarian entrants, other than *migrant child education
- Citizenship
- Ethnic affairs
- Multicultural affairs

== Structure ==
The department was an Australian Public Service department, staffed by officials who were responsible to the minister for immigration and multicultural affairs, Amanda Vanstone. The secretary of the department was Andrew Metcalfe.

== References and further reading ==
- Department of Immigration and Multicultural Affairs (October 2006), Department of Immigration and Multicultural Affairs Annual Report 2005-06 (PDF), Department of Immigration and Multicultural Affairs, ISBN 0-97581817 1, archived from the original (PDF) on 12 June 2007
- Department of Immigration and Citizenship (October 2007), Department of Immigration and Citizenship Annual Report 2006-07 (PDF), Department of Immigration and Citizenship, ISBN 978-09803727-8-6, archived from the original (PDF) on 1 April 2012
