= Mike Pezzullo =

Former Australian public servant

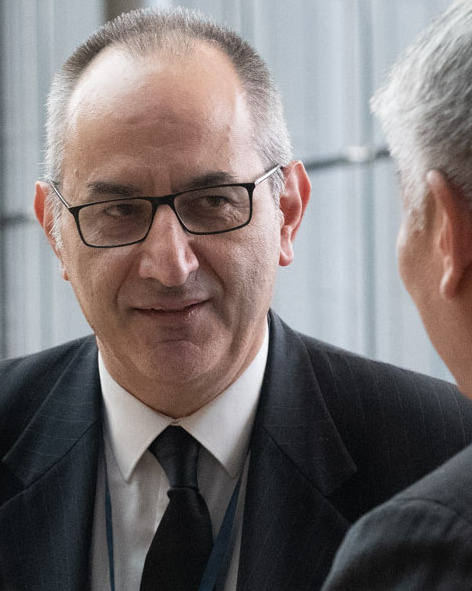
- Mike Pezzullo in 2022

Secretary of the Department of Home Affairs
- In office 20 December 2017 – 27 November 2023
- Preceded by: New office
- Succeeded by: Stephanie Foster

Secretary of the Department of Immigration and Border Protection
- In office 13 October 2014 – 19 December 2017
- Preceded by: Martin Bowles
- Succeeded by: Merged into home affairs

Personal details
- Born: 1964 or 1965 (age 61–62) St George, Southern Sydney
- Spouse: Lynne Pezzullo
- Children: 4
- Education: University of Sydney
- Occupation: Public servant

Michael Pezzullo (born 1964 or 1965) is a former Australian public servant who served as Secretary of the Department of Home Affairs, from 2017 until 2023. Previous to this role he had been the Secretary of the Department of Immigration and Border Protection and before that, the chief executive officer of the Australian Customs and Border Protection Service. His role as Secretary of Home Affairs, and employment in the Australian Public Service, was terminated following a review which found he had breached the Australian Public Service Code of Conduct at least 14 times. He was also found to have engaged in "gossip and disrespectful critique" of ministers. He was replaced by Stephanie Foster.

== Early life and education ==
A child of Italian immigrants from Campania in Southern Italy, Pezzullo was born and raised in the suburbs of St George, Sydney. In an interview for the Institute of Public Administration Australia, Pezzullo said his childhood was "very boring", dominated by "a lot of reading of about things like Australia's involvement in the wars, the post-war reconstruction period." He attended Marist College Kogarah, playing Rugby League. With hopes of an academic career on the history of warfare and strategy, Pezzullo completed a Bachelor of Arts (with Honours) in History at the University of Sydney. His supervisor and mentor, R. J. B. Bosworth, advised him to pursue a graduate position with Defence as academia would be "limiting."

== Career ==
Pezzullo joined the Department of Defence as a graduate in 1987. After five years in the Defence department, Pezzullo discovered "the experience, age and, to some extent, ideological and almost philosophical gap between [him] and the next level up meant [he] would not advance until [he] became crusty, old and cynical," so in 1992 he transferred to the Department of Prime Minister and Cabinet, where he worked in the International Division.

In 1993 Pezzullo joined the staff of the Minister for Foreign Affairs, Senator Gareth Evans, whom he later described as a friend. He remained in Parliament House until December 2001, including as deputy chief of staff to then opposition leader Kim Beazley. In February 2002, he rejoined the Department of Defence and, in 2006, was promoted to the position of Deputy Secretary Strategy in that department. Between February 2008 and May 2009 he led the Defence White Paper team and was principal author of the 2009 Defence White Paper.

In July 2009 Pezzullo joined the Australian Customs and Border Protection Service as chief operating officer, a role which he continued in until September 2012. He was promoted to acting chief executive over the period September 2012 to February 2013 and on 15 February 2013 was employed as the substantive CEO. When appointing Pezzullo, then Home Affairs Minister Jason Clare told media that Customs required major structural change, and Pezzullo had been appointed to drive reforms. In the role, Pezzullo emphasised the importance of border security not only as a security issue, but also as an economic concern.

On 2 October 2014 Prime Minister Tony Abbott announced that he had made Pezzullo the new Secretary of the Department of Immigration and Border Protection, effective 13 October 2014, replacing Martin Bowles. As immigration secretary, Pezzullo led changes in his department recasting what had been seen as traditional immigration and border security institutions and doctrines.

On 5 September 2019, Pezzullo was reappointed Secretary of the Department of Home Affairs for a period of 5 years commencing on 13 October 2019.

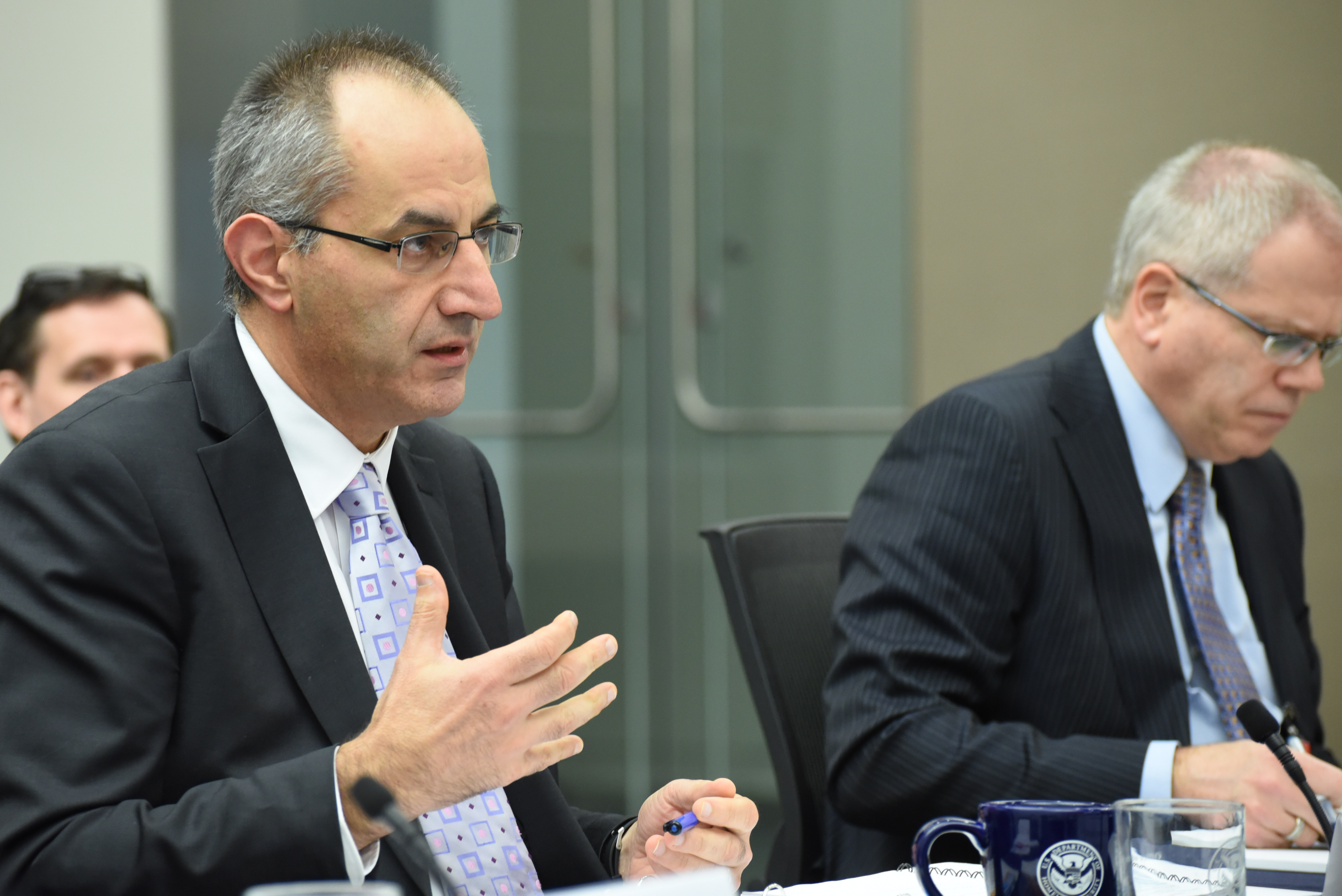
Mike Pezzullo joined by officials at the Five Country Ministerial, Washington DC, September 2016

In April 2021, in an Anzac Day message to staff, Pezzullo said Australia must strive to reduce the likelihood of war "but not at the cost of our precious liberty". His message had come as then Defence Minister Peter Dutton said war with China should not be discounted.

=== Management of conflict of interest ===
The Sydney Morning Herald reported that early in 2014, Pezzullo's brother escaped a criminal conviction after he confessed to lying to an inquiry investigating corruption at Sydney airport.

His brother, a former Customs officer, was fined and placed on a two-year good behaviour bond for perjuring himself before a corruption watchdog. The 42-year-old was charged after an investigation over allegations he sold prescription drugs to fellow Sydney Airport Customs officers and lied to the Australian Commission for Law Enforcement Integrity. The commission was investigating several of his colleagues for drug importation and bribery. Despite being told verbally and in writing not to tell anyone of the summons, he told his flatmate, a former Customs officer. His brother's sentencing took place in June 2014.

While the case was underway Michael Pezzullo was fulfilling senior executive roles in Customs and Border Protection, but had disclosed the conflict to his minister from the outset. In a note to staff regarding the case he was reported to have said: "from the outset, I asked and expected to be treated as a detached family member with no official rights, interests or powers in the matter." The communique also details the processes that were implemented to manage any real or perceived conflict of interest relating to the case.

=== WhatsApp message scandal ===
On 25 September 2023 at the direction of then Home Affairs Minister Clare O'Neil, Pezzullo was stood aside pending an investigation following revelations he had made partisan interventions during the 2018 Liberal Party of Australia leadership spills. Pezzullo is alleged to have unduly influenced this process by communicating his leadership and ministerial preferences to Liberal Party powerbroker Scott Briggs.

=== Code of Conduct breaches ===
Then Home Affairs Minister Clare O'Neil referred the allegations concerning Pezzullo, including the WhatsApp message scandal, to the Australian Public Service Commissioner, Dr Gordon de Brouwer, who then set up an inquiry. Pezzullo stood aside during the investigation.

The independent inquiry, led by Lynelle Briggs, determined Pezzullo had breached the Australian Public Service code of conduct at least 14 times in relation to 5 overarching allegations: (i) used his duty, power, status or authority to seek to gain a benefit or advantage for himself; (ii) engaged in gossip and disrespectful critique of Ministers and public servants; (iii) failed to maintain confidentiality of sensitive government information; (iv) failed to act apolitically in his employment; and (v) failed to disclose a conflict of interest.

The findings were announced in an official media statement from the Australian Public Service Commission, released on 27 November 2023. On the same day, Pezzullo was officially sacked. Most significantly, the review had found he had "used his status to gain a benefit for himself, failing to be apolitical, and engaging in 'gossip and disrespectful critique' of ministers."

== Honours and awards ==
Pezzullo was made an Officer of the Order of Australia (AO) in the 2020 Queens Birthday Honours for "distinguished service to public administration through leadership roles in the areas of national security, border control and immigration". The media note for the award advises he was Secretary of the Department of Home Affairs since 2014.

In March 2024, it was reported that a process to strip Pezzullo of his AO was taking place. On 26 September 2024, the Governor-General terminated Pezzullo's appointment as an Officer of the Order of Australia.

== Personal life ==
Pezzullo is married to Lynne, an economist, and together they have raised four children. They are known to be keen bushwalkers, having climbed Mount Toubkal in Morocco and the Kokoda Track in Papua New Guinea. Having been raised Catholic, Pezzullo chose to join his wife's faith community, in the Anglican Church.

Government offices
Preceded by Michael Carmody	Chief Executive Officer of the Australian Customs and Border Protection Service; 2012–2014	Succeeded by Roman Quaedvlieg
Preceded by Martin Bowles	Secretary of the Department of Immigration and Border Protection; 2014–2017	Department restructured
New title	Secretary of the Department of Home Affairs; 2017–2023	Succeeded by Stephanie Foster
