= Ron Brown (Australian public servant) =

Australian public servant

Secretary of the Department of Immigration and Ethnic Affairs
- In office 21 May 1987 – 24 July 1987

Secretary of the Department of Immigration, Local Government and Ethnic Affairs
- In office 24 July 1987 – 1 April 1990

Personal details
- Born: 4 November 1943 (age 82) Brisbane, Queensland, Australia
- Occupation: Public servant and company director

Ron Brown is a retired senior Australian public servant. He was Secretary of the Department of Immigration, Local Government and Ethnic Affairs between 1987 and 1990 under the Hawke government.

== Career ==
Ron Brown was the State Director of Social Security in the Northern Territory, Tasmania, South Australia and New South Wales between 1977 and 1985, and then executive director at the Special Broadcasting Service (SBS) between 1985 and 1987.

In May 1987, Brown was appointed Secretary of the Department of Immigration and Ethnic Affairs (later Department of Immigration, Local Government and Ethnic Affairs).

Brown left the Australian Public Service shortly after the 1990 federal election, thought to have been sacked by Prime Minister Bob Hawke, perhaps due to his not being sufficiently responsive to certain ethnic communities, or perhaps as an effort to remove Brown's Deputy Secretary, Tony Harris.

Government offices
Preceded by Bill McKinnon	Secretary of the Department of Immigration and Ethnic Affairs; 1987	Succeeded by Himself as Secretary of the Department of Immigration, Local Government and Ethnic Affairs
Preceded by Himself as Secretary of the Department of Immigration and Ethnic Affairs	Secretary of the Department of Immigration, Local Government and Ethnic Affairs; 1987–1990	Succeeded by Chris Conybeare
Preceded by Kenneth Norman Jones as Secretary of the Department of Local Government and Administrative Services	Secretary of the Department of Immigration, Local Government and Ethnic Affairs; 1987–1990	Succeeded by Chris Conybeare
