= Debbie Kilroy =

Australian human rights activist and prison reformer

- Born: Deborah Harding; 1961 (age 64–65); Brisbane, Queensland, Australia
- Education: . University of Queensland
- Occupations: Human rights activist, prison reformer, lawyer
- Years active: 1992–present
- Known for: Founder of Sisters Inside
- Spouse: Joe Kilroy
- Website: www.sistersinside.com.au

Debbie Kilroy OAM (born 1961), née Deborah Harding, is an Australian human rights activist and prison reformer. She is known for having founded Sisters Inside, an independent community organisation based in Queensland, Australia, that advocates for the human rights of women and girls in the criminal legal system. She is a qualified lawyer, who in 2007 was the first person with serious convictions to be allowed to practise law by the Supreme Court of Queensland.

== Early life and education ==
Deborah Harding was born in 1961 in Brisbane, and raised in the suburb of Kedron, Queensland. During her teens, she became rebellious, and, after being locked up at the age of 14 for a four-week psychiatric assessment, began a period of increasing criminalisation and imprisonment, with only brief periods out of the criminal justice system during her teens. Witnessing and being a victim of injustices within the system, her early experiences with it made her angry.

She had a child at the age of 18, and endured a violent relationship for some years. After leaving that relationship she met and in 1986 married her present husband, rugby league footballer Joe Kilroy, and they had a child together. Debbie was sentenced to six years in prison after having sold cannabis to undercover police.

In 1990, she witnessed her friend Debbie Dick being murdered in the overcrowded Boggo Road Gaol, and has said that "[her] commitment to fight against the criminalisation and imprisonment of women is in honour of her memory and the memories of all the women and girls who have died at the hands of the prison industrial complex". As a result of this murder, the prison authorities started involving prisoners in committees that helped to run the prison.

During the three years that she served of her sentence before her release in 1992, she began training as a social worker through the University of Queensland, determined to improve the situation of women and children in prison.

== Sisters Inside ==
Upon her release from prison in 1992, Kilroy started to establish Sisters Inside, an organisation dedicated to responding to the needs and human rights of criminalised women and the children affected by their imprisonment that were not being met by available services. At first Sisters Inside was a small group run mostly by volunteers, but it has grown into a larger community-based organisation providing a range of services to many women and children in Queensland. Author Melissa Lucashenko is a founding member.

The motto of Sisters Inside is "nothing about us without us".

== Career ==
Kilroy completed her legal training as well as a Graduate Diploma in Forensic Mental Health (she is trained in gestalt therapy), and in 2017 was the first former prisoner to be admitted as a legal practitioner by the Supreme Court of Queensland, a decision ruled by Justice Paul de Jersey, future chief justice and later governor of Queensland.

She opened her own legal practice in 2013.

Kilroy has served as an Executive Member of the Queensland Council for Civil Liberties since 2001 and ex-officio chairperson of the Youth Affairs Network of Queensland since 1997 (As of 2019). She has also served a member of a number of other bodies and organisations, including:

- the Criminal Law Committee;
- Law Council of Australia
- Criminal Law Committee, Queensland Law Society
- Equal Rights Alliance
- Australian Women Again Violence Alliance
- National Coronial Reform, Federation of Community Legal Centres
- Criminal Justice Network

She has been appointed to state and national working groups on a range of legal and social issues, and has also contributed to international forums, such as meetings convened by the UN Office on Drugs and Crime to develop draft UN Rules for the Treatment of Women Prisoners and Non-Custodial Measures for Women Offenders; sessions of the Commission on the Status of Women; and conferences on crime prevention and criminal justice.

In November 2016 Kilroy was appointed to Queensland's Sentencing Advisory Council. She believes that the council has an important role to play in educating the public, to counteract the "law-and-order hysteria" seen in the media and spruiked by politicians.

In early 2019, she led a crowd-funding campaign called #freeher to pay off the court debts of Indigenous women in Western Australia who had been imprisoned for defaulting on fines, raising over A$400,000 and enabling the release of 11 women. Amendments to the WA legislation were passed in 2020, partly as result of the recommendation from the coronial inquiry into the death of Ms Dhu, who died in police custody.

In April 2020 Kilroy contracted COVID-19 after travelling to the United States with her friend and colleague Boneeta-Marie Mabo, with both becoming so unwell that they were admitted to hospital. Around 18 months of contracting the virus, in September 2021, she was still suffering from Long COVID, with a debilitating range of symptoms.

As of 2021 she is principal of the law firm Kilroy & Callaghan, where she leads a team of five, and CEO of Sisters Inside. She is passionate about encouraging former offenders, and in particular Aboriginal and Torres Strait Islander and culturally diverse women to become criminal lawyers.

== Beliefs and advocacy ==
Kilroy's experience of imprisonment led to her belief that unnecessary trauma caused by the prison system, including solitary confinement as a punishment for self-harm, leads to a greater likelihood of women re-offending and ending up back in prison. Influenced by people such as the US academic, activist and former prisoner Angela Davis, Kilroy believes that the prison system fails in its mission to punish and rehabilitate, with more than half of women released from prison returning to spend another stint there. She names two other former prisoners as heroes of hers: Nelson Mandela and Aung San Suu Kyi

She has said that there is a need to break down "racism, misogyny and sexism within the legal frameworks", and that harsher sentences are not the answer. She points out that "The vast majority of women prisoners are imprisoned for minor, non-violent crimes... [which] are often poverty-related", with around 40% being onremand, as yet untried for their alleged crimes. She says:

Too often women are imprisoned on remand for failures of the state. Failure to provide adequate income support, to support women leaving violent homes, to provide essential housing and health services, and to address multigenerational harm arising from colonisation.

She engages in public debate and advocates for women on a range of issues, including violence, homelessness, racism, mental health, substance abuse, poverty, child protection, sexual assault, and failures in government systems. She aims to reduce the rate of criminalisation and imprisonment of women and children, in particular the over-representation of Aboriginal and Torres Strait Islander within the criminal justice system, and to women reduce the impact of mothers' imprisonment on their children.

== Recognition ==
- 2003: Order of Australia Medal
- 2004: Australian Human Rights Medal
- 2010: Emergent Woman Lawyer of the Year
- 2010: Peace Women Award
- 2014: Churchill Fellowship
- 2016: shortlisted Queensland nomination for Australian of the Year
- 2019: keynote speaker at the Law Institute of Victoria's Women in Leadership lunch
- 2019: Voltaire Human Rights Award

== In media and the arts ==
- Australian Story on ABC Television (2004 and 2019)
- Kilroy was Here, a biography by Kristina Olsson (2005)
- Archibald Prize entry (2005) and portrait by Ai Wei Wei (2015)
- The Drum on ABC Television
