= Department of Immigration, Local Government and Ethnic Affairs =

Australian government department, 1987–1993

Department overview
- Formed: 24 July 1987
- Preceding Department: Department of Immigration and Ethnic Affairs (I) – all functions and legislative responsibilities; Department of Local Government and Administrative Services – for local government and regional development services
- Dissolved: 24 March 1993
- Superseding Department: Department of Industry, Technology and Regional Development – for regional development functions; Department of Health, Housing, Local Government and Community Services – for local government functions Department of Immigration and Ethnic Affairs (II) – for immigration and ethnic affairs
- Jurisdiction: Commonwealth of Australia
- Headquarters: Belconnen, Canberra
- Department executives: Ron Brown, Secretary (1987–1990); Chris Conybeare, Secretary (1990–1993)

The Department of Immigration, Local Government and Ethnic Affairs was an Australian government department that existed between July 1987 and March 1993.

== Scope ==
Information about the department's functions and government funding allocation could be found in the Administrative Arrangements Orders, the annual Portfolio Budget Statements and in the Department's annual reports.

According to the Administrative Arrangements Order made on 24 July 1987, the Department dealt with:

- Migration, including refugees
- Citizenship and aliens
- Ethic affairs
- Post-arrival arrangements for migrants, other than migrant child education
- Matters relating to local government
- Regional development

== Structure ==
The Department was an Australian Public Service department, staffed by officials who were responsible to the Minister for Immigration, Local Government and Ethnic Affairs. The Ministers were Mick Young (until February 1998), then Clyde Holding (from February 1998 until September 1988), then Robert Ray (September 1988 to April 1990 and finally Gerry Hand (April 1990 until March 1993).

From 24 July 1987 to 1 April 1990, the Secretary of the Department was Ron Brown; from 1 April 1990 to 24 March 1993, the Secretary was Chris Conybeare.
