= Department of Immigration and Multicultural Affairs (1996–2001) =

Former Australian government department

Department overview
- Formed: 11 March 1996
- Preceding Department: Department of Immigration and Ethnic Affairs (II) Department of the Prime Minister and Cabinet – for multicultural affairs
- Dissolved: 26 November 2001
- Superseding Department: Department of Immigration and Multicultural and Indigenous Affairs
- Jurisdiction: Commonwealth of Australia
- Headquarters: Canberra
- Annual budget: $350 million (approximate annual operating budget in 2000)
- Minister responsible: Philip Ruddock, Minister for Immigration and Multicultural Affairs
- Department executives: Helen Williams, Secretary (1996–1998); Bill Farmer, Secretary (1998–2001)
- Child agencies: Refugee Review Tribunal; Immigration Review Tribunal
- Website: immi.gov.au

The Department of Immigration and Multicultural Affairs (also called DIMA) was an Australian government department that existed between March 1996 and November 2001. Its slogan was "Enriching Australia through migration".

== Scope ==
Information about the department's functions and government funding allocation could be found in the Administrative Arrangements Orders, the annual Portfolio Budget Statements, in the department's annual reports and on the department's website.

According to the Administrative Arrangements Order made on 11 March 1996, the department dealt with:

- Migration, including refugees
- Citizenship
- Ethnic affairs
- Post-arrival arrangements for migrants, other than migrant child education
- Multicultural affairs

== Structure ==
The department was an Australian Public Service department, staffed by officials who were responsible to the Minister for Immigration and Multicultural Affairs, Philip Ruddock. The Secretary of the department was Helen Williams (until February 1998) and then Bill Farmer. In 2000, the department had approximately 3600 staff.
