= Stephanie Foster (public servant) =

Secretary of the Australian Department of Home Affairs

Stephanie Foster PSM
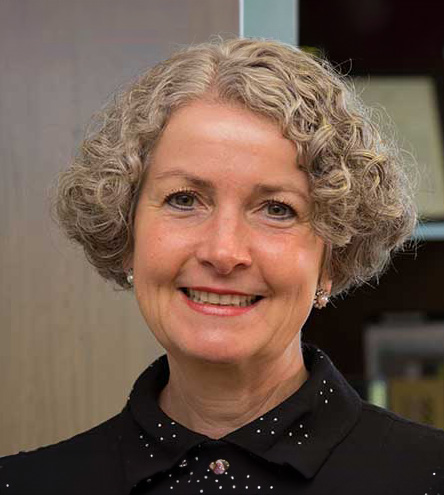
- Official portrait, 2018

Secretary of the Department of Home Affairs
- Incumbent
- Assumed office 28 November 2023
- Preceded by: Mike Pezzullo

Personal details
- Education: Monash University
- Occupation: Public servant
- Salary: $905,043 in 2024

Stephanie Foster, PSM is an Australian senior public servant. She assumed the role of Secretary of the Department of Home Affairs in November 2023, replacing long-serving secretary Mike Pezzullo after his dismissal for breaching the Australian Public Service Code of Conduct. Some commentators described her appointment as one focused on 'cleaning up' after her predecessor's maladministration.

== Career ==
Foster's career in the Australian Public Service began in 1987 in the area of Defence. First, after entering as a graduate, she spent 16 years at the Defence Signals Directorate (DSD), including as a signals intelligence officer. In 2003, she moved out of DSD and was appointed to lead Defence’s International Policy Division as first assistant secretary.

She was first appointed to the level of Deputy Secretary in November 2008, when she moved to the Department of Infrastructure, Transport, Regional Development and Local Government. There — among other duties — she was responsible delivering an infrastructure package for local government, the Regional and Local Community Infrastructure Program (RLCIP). A stimulus measure responding to the 2008 financial crisis, the RLCIP allocated over $1.1 billion to local governments for community infrastructure projects, with the goals of stimulating the economy to aid in economic recovery, generating employment opportunities, and helping councils tackle the accumulation of pending work in community infrastructure.

Foster served as Deputy Secretary of Governance at the Department of the Prime Minister and Cabinet (DPMC) starting in December 2017. Her responsibilities there included overseeing the Executive Branch of Government, managing Cabinet and Cabinet Committees, and promoting the government's legislative agenda. She rose to public prominence in that role when she conducted a review of processes for workplace complaints at Parliament House in response to allegations that Brittany Higgins, a former ministerial staffer was sexually assaulted by a colleague in the office of the then-defence industry minister in 2019. All ten recommendations of the resultant 'Foster Report' were accepted by the Government, including the establishment of a one-hour optional sexual harassment training program for Australian parliamentarians, and an incident reporting hotline. Foster was briefly Acting Secretary of Department of the Prime Minister and Cabinet after the resignation of Phil Gaetjens in 2022.

Prior to her appointment as Secretary of Home Affairs, Foster held the role of Associate Secretary of Immigration within the department.

She received the Public Service Medal in 2008 "for outstanding public service in the provision of high-level policy advice to government in relation to the deployment of Australian military personnel on overseas operations".

== Education ==
Foster holds a Bachelor of Arts (Honours) from Monash University.

== Controversies ==
The Regional and Local Community Infrastructure Program — for which Foster was responsible as the Deputy Secretary overseeing Policy and Implementation, under Secretary Glenys Beauchamp — was the subject of two highly critical performance audits. In their first audit, the Australian National Audit Office (ANAO) found that only some grant applications were subject to "systematic consideration of eligibility and compliance" and that the assessment criteria that would be used to select the successful applications were never published. The most "significant failing" identified in the audit was the failure to "provide recommendations to the Minister about which projects should be approved within the available funding of $550 million". In their second audit, the ANAO found that the department had not adequately monitored grant expenditure, leading to delays in delivering the planned fiscal stimulus. Foster described the audit reports as "the worst...the department has ever had to date as a result of my management of that program."

Foster was the subject of considerable media scrutiny during her time as Deputy Secretary of Governance at DPMC. When answering questions at Senate Estimates about the payment of former Attorney-General Christian Porter's legal fees by a blind trust with funds from an unknown source, Foster appeared to answer a question and then wink to her right at government Senator Simon Birmingham. After this was highlighted on social media, Foster at first denied that she had winked at the Senator. However, she later acknowledged that it was possible that she was winking, but held that she was winking at a departmental colleague rather than the Senator.

Also while in DPMC, Foster played a role in the Scott Morrison ministerial positions controversy. As Deputy Secretary Governance, it was Foster who suggested that the Prime Minister also assume the Health Ministers powers during the COVID-19 pandemic by being “cross sworn” into the Health portfolio. She sought advice from the Attorney-General's Department on the legality of this possibility, who agreed that it was both lawful and possible but unnecessary. Foster reportedly "did not consider the decision not to make appointment public [of Scott Morrison to the Health Portfolio] to be inappropriate or wrong." Former Prime Minister Malcolm Turnbull discussed Foster's involvement critically, tweeting that "PMC officials including Stephanie Foster must have known this was utterly without precedent and wrong. What did they do and say. If they did nothing – the system failed."

The process for Foster's later appointment as Departmental Secretary of Home Affairs in late November 2023 also received considerable public criticism. The Albanese Labor Government had recently committed a merit-based appointment process for all new secretaries earlier that month. However, Foster's appointment was made without a merit-based process, amounting to a walking back of the Government's commitment in less than one month. Critics suggest that this was inappropriate given the importance of the role and the $928,000 salary it attracts.

In March 2024, Foster became the subject of media attention following the release of a document concerning crimes purportedly committed by released immigration detainees. The document was made public at the beginning of Senate Estimates hearings, contrary to the reported wishes of Home Affairs Minister Clare O'Neil, who had preferred the document to remain undisclosed and intended for Foster to address inquiries verbally later on the same day. Subsequent reports indicated that Foster departed from the Minister's office visibly distressed after a rebuke for disclosing information deemed embarrassing to the Government. Foster, addressing a Senate committee, refuted allegations of verbal abuse from the Minister and denied any attempt by the Minister to influence her decision to disclose documents to the Senate. She left her meeting with the Minister in tears.

Facing scrutiny over departmental culture, in November 2024 Foster was forced to defend her leadership after a sharp decline in staff confidence around reporting inappropriate behaviour was revealed in the 2024 Australian Public Service census. The 2024 Australian Public Service staff census indicated a 10-percentage-point drop in employees feeling safe to speak up, decreasing to 65%. During Senate estimates, Foster attributed this decline to an anomaly and highlighted increased reporting of bullying and harassment as evidence of improved transparency. She emphasised her regular engagement with staff through monthly meetings. However, Greens Senator David Shoebridge criticised her explanation, suggesting that large-scale meetings were insufficient for addressing cultural issues, and questioned the effectiveness of her leadership in fostering a supportive workplace environment.

In March 2025, she admitted to using the encrypted messaging app Signal for work purposes, including its disappearing messages feature. Her use of the app drew scrutiny amid broader concerns about government record-keeping (especially around the time of Signalgate in the United States), but Foster maintained it was limited to routine matters and complied with legal obligations. The incident highlighted gaps in policy across agencies regarding the use of encrypted communications.
