= Sisters Inside =

Australian charity for criminalised women

- Founder: Debbie Kilroy
- Type: Nonprofit
- Legal status: Charity
- Website: sistersinside.com.au

Sisters Inside is an Australian registered charity which supports and advocates for criminalised women and girls and their children. It is based in Queensland, with offices in Brisbane and Townsville.

The human rights activist and lawyer Debbie Kilroy is the founder and CEO of the organisation.

Sisters Inside describes itself as a grassroots organisation run by criminalised women for the benefit of "all of us inside". In its advocacy work, it calls for decarceration and prison abolition. The daily work of the organisation focuses on providing support to incarcerated and criminalised women, with a focus on supporting First Nations women.

== History ==
Sisters Inside's founder Debbie Kilroy has a long history of experience with the criminal justice system and incarceration, starting at the age of 13. She began her advocacy work in the early 1990s while incarcerated as part of a prisoners' committee. Upon her release on parole in 1992 she formed Sisters Inside with other women.

In 2019, Sisters Inside started a campaign called #FreeHer raising funds to pay fines of Aboriginal women in Western Australia who were imprisoned or at risk of imprisonment for non-payment of fines. The campaign received support from celebrities including Yael Stone and Russell Crowe. By June 2019, it had raised $400,000.
