= Department of Immigration and Ethnic Affairs (1993–1996) =

Government department

Department overview
- Formed: 24 March 1993
- Preceding Department: Department of Immigration, Local Government and Ethnic Affairs
- Dissolved: 11 March 1996
- Superseding Department: Department of Immigration and Multicultural Affairs (I)
- Jurisdiction: Commonwealth of Australia
- Headquarters: Canberra
- Minister responsible: Alan Griffiths, Minister for Immigration and Ethnic Affairs
- Department executive: Chris Conybeare, Secretary

The Department of Immigration and Ethnic Affairs was an Australian government department that existed between March 1993 and March 1996.

== Scope ==
Information about the department's functions and government funding allocation could be found in the Administrative Arrangements Orders, the annual Portfolio Budget Statements and in the department's annual reports.

According to the Administrative Arrangements Order made on 24 March 1993, the department dealt with:

- Migration, including refugees
- Citizenship
- Ethnic affairs
- Post-arrival arrangements for migrants, other than migrant child education

== Structure ==
The department was an Australian Public Service department, staffed by officials who were responsible to the Minister for Immigration and Ethnic Affairs. The Minister was Nick Bolkus.

The Secretary of the Department was C. Conybeare.
