= Amanda Vanstone =

Australian politician (born 1952)

The Honourable Amanda Vanstone AO
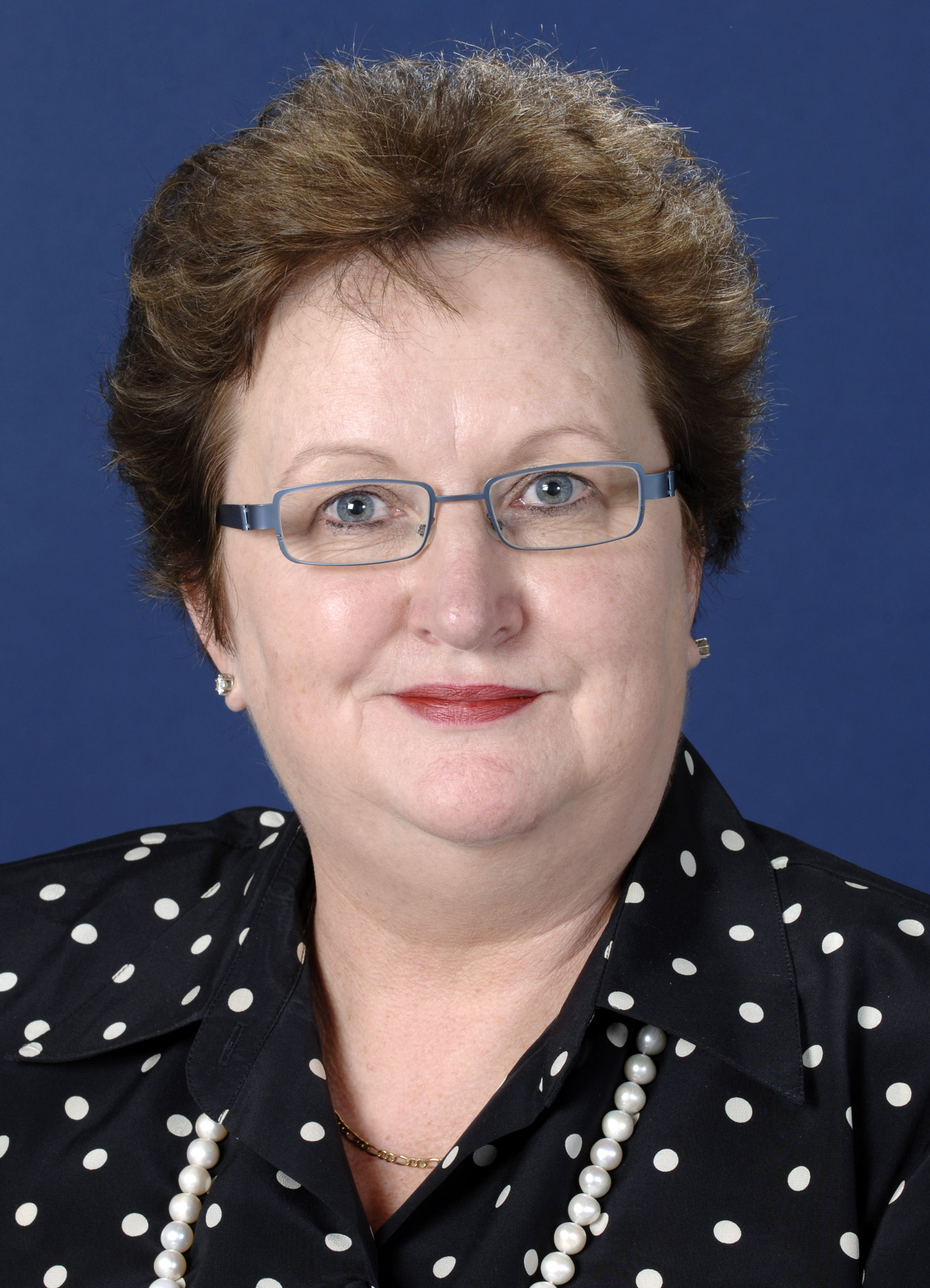
- Official portrait, 2007

Minister for Education Minister for Employment
- In office 11 March 1996 – 9 October 1997
- Prime Minister: John Howard
- Preceded by: Simon Crean
- Succeeded by: David Kemp

Minister for Justice
- In office 9 October 1997 – 30 January 2001
- Prime Minister: John Howard
- Preceded by: Daryl Williams
- Succeeded by: Chris Ellison

Minister for Family and Community Services
- In office 10 November 2001 – 7 October 2003
- Prime Minister: John Howard
- Preceded by: Jocelyn Newman
- Succeeded by: Kay Patterson

Minister for Immigration and Multicultural Affairs
- In office 7 October 2003 – 30 January 2007
- Prime Minister: John Howard
- Preceded by: Phillip Ruddock
- Succeeded by: Kevin Andrews

Senator for South Australia
- In office 1 December 1984 – 26 April 2007
- Succeeded by: Mary Jo Fisher

Personal details
- Born: 7 December 1952 (age 73) Adelaide, South Australia
- Party: Liberal Party of Australia
- Education: St Peter's Girls' School
- Alma mater: University of Adelaide (BA) (LLB)

Amanda Eloise Vanstone (née O'Brien; born 7 December 1952) is an Australian former politician and a former Ambassador to Italy. She was a Liberal Senator for South Australia from 1984 to 2007, and held several ministerial portfolios in the Howard government. After her resignation from the Senate in 2007, she then served as the Australian Ambassador to Italy until July 2010. Her time as Minister for Immigration was marked by controversies within the Department of Immigration and Multicultural and Indigenous Affairs.

== Early life ==
Vanstone was born Amanda Eloise O'Brien on 7 December 1952 in Adelaide, South Australia. She is the youngest of four children. Her father died when she was three. Her mother remarried soon afterwards, but not long after this her stepfather also died. She was educated at the St Peter's Collegiate Girls' School. Vanstone has said that she does not defer to male authority due to growing up in a female-headed household and attending a school run by women.

At the University of Adelaide, Vanstone received both Bachelor of Arts and Bachelor of Law degrees. She also earned a Graduate Diploma in Legal Practice and a Marketing Studies Certificate from the South Australian Institute of Technology which is now the University of South Australia. In the late 1980s, she married Tony Vanstone, a commercial lawyer from Adelaide, taking his surname. Prior to entering politics, she worked as a retailer in a large department store, and later had her own business selling prints and picture-frames. She also worked as a legal practitioner.

== Political career ==
In December 1984, at age 31, Vanstone was elected the youngest member of the Australian Senate as a representative for South Australia. She was one of 27 senators for the Liberal Party of Australia elected that year. Vanstone's maiden speech to the Senate was made on 27 March 1985 and addressed issues that young Australians had with the then Labor Government led by Prime Minister Bob Hawke.

Vanstone was a member of the Opposition Shadow Ministry from 1987 to 1988, from 1989 to 1990 and from 1993 to 1996, serving as Shadow Attorney-General and Shadow Minister for Justice from 1994 to 1996.

In May 1990, as an opposition backbencher, Vanstone was instrumental in the introduction of televised proceedings in parliament.

In March 1996, Vanstone became one of the two women (with Jocelyn Newman) in John Howard's cabinet when she was appointed Minister for Employment, Education, Training and Youth Affairs. In this portfolio she presided over heavy cuts to the employment programs established by the Keating government, which drew strong criticism. In October 1997 she was dropped from Cabinet and appointed Minister for Justice, a title which was changed to Minister for Justice and Customs in October 1998.

Vanstone made a comeback in January 2001 when she was re-appointed to Cabinet as Minister for Family and Community Services. During this period she was also Minister Assisting the Prime Minister for the Status of Women. In the Family and Community Services portfolio she presided over the Australian social security programs including Centrelink, attracting criticism by welfare activists. Vanstone frequently defended the Howard government's policies, and the then Shadow Minister for Family and Community Services, Wayne Swan, described her as "a political hyena who takes delight in attacking society's most vulnerable".

In his reshuffle in October 2003, Howard appointed Vanstone Minister for Immigration and Multicultural and Indigenous Affairs and Minister Assisting the Prime Minister for Reconciliation, one of the most difficult portfolios in the government because of controversies over boat people and Australia's "Pacific Solution". Her biggest decision in this portfolio was to abolish the Aboriginal and Torres Strait Islander Commission (ATSIC). The abolition of ATSIC was generally supported, but there was controversy over what should replace it.

During 2005, Vanstone became involved in some major controversies, one of them involving a defecting Chinese diplomat, Chen Yonglin, whilst others involved the deportation of Australian citizens and permanent residents who her department considered undesirable – the Cornelia Rau, Vivian Alvarez Solon, Stefan Nystrom and Robert Jovicic cases. An inquiry by the former Australian Federal Police commissioner Mick Palmer was severely critical of the Immigration Department's treatment of Cornelia Rau, an Australian citizen wrongly presumed to be an illegal immigrant, and held in a Brisbane women's prison for six months.

She had also been criticised for overturning a deportation order and granting a visa in 2005 to Francesco Madafferi who had been implicated by Italian officials as a dangerous mafia figure. In fact Madafferi is thought to be a member of the Calabrian 'Ndrangheta, known by the name Honoured Society in Australia, which, although similar, is a crime organisation distinct from the Sicilian Mafia (however, common usage is to lump all such organisations together as Mafia). Francesco and his brother Antonio ("Tony") Madafferi, a stall holder in Melbourne's Wholesale Fruit and Vegetable market (known to have been controlled by the Honoured Society), were alleged in a report by Victoria Police's organised crime squad to belong to a crime family involved in blackmail, extortion and murder. The report was aired in 2000 at a court hearing during Francesco's fight against deportation, but was later dismissed by an Administrative Appeals Tribunal judge as containing information from unnamed and possibly unreliable police informers. Vanstone justified her decision to grant Madafferi a visa because of a mental illness he was said to be suffering. However it is alleged that relatives and associates of Madafferi donated up to $100,000 to the Liberal Party, and that four Liberal party politicians had discussed the visa case with Madafferi's supporters or Vanstone's office. In August 2008, Madafferi was arrested and charged, along with several of Australia's other suspected crime bosses (including Australian 'Ndrangheta boss Pasquale "Pat" Barbaro), after Australian Federal Police made the world's biggest ecstasy haul, seizing drugs with a street value of $440 million.

In January 2006, a ministerial reshuffle saw Indigenous Affairs transferred to Mal Brough. Vanstone's title was changed to Minister for Immigration and Multicultural Affairs. In January 2007, the Senator was removed from the cabinet after an election-year reshuffle, with Kevin Andrews replacing her as the Immigration Minister in the new Department of Immigration and Citizenship (DIAC).

In July 2006, Vanstone was criticised for holding shares in the South Australian agribusiness Wasley's Piggery. Wasley's had come under fire after the group, Animal Liberation Australia, revealed footage of animal conditions which they say did not adhere to the state's animal welfare regulations. Vanstone responded stating that she is 'simply one shareholder in the business'. The RSPCA later conducted an inspection and found that while the sow stall sizes were smaller than regulation, the size was only a recommendation and could not be enforced.

In February 2007, she released the lyrics to her "Ode to Australia", Under Southern Stars.

On 26 April 2007, Vanstone announced her immediate resignation from politics, telling reporters, "It is always important to look to the future and with that in mind it is important for me to move on to the next phase of my life".

It was announced that she was to be appointed an Ambassador to Italy.

In October 2012, Vanstone joined the board of the Port Adelaide Football Club.

In 2012 Amanda Vanstone was the guest presenter on the ABC Radio National program 'Counterpoint', and as of 2013 is now its full-time presenter every Monday at 4pm.

In 2013 and 2014 she was a member of the Abbott government's National Commission of Audit, which was established to improve the Australian government's budget. In 2018 she was appointed to the Lockheed Martin Australia Board.

She is the Chairwoman of Vision 20/20 Australia.

== Political views ==
Vanstone is a former Liberal Party politician who, as host of the Counterpoint radio program since 2013, has become a political journalist at the ABC. She supported the leadership ambitions of Malcolm Turnbull over those of Tony Abbott in the 2015 Liberal leadership spill that saw Turnbull take the Prime Ministership. She describes herself as a "liberal" rather than a "conservative".

She was a leading member of the Liberal Party of Australia's moderate faction and a mentor to younger Liberal moderates, including fellow South Australian Christopher Pyne.

Parliament of Australia
Preceded by Simon Crean	Minister for Employment, Education, Training and Youth Affairs; 1996–97	Succeeded by David Kemp
Preceded by Daryl Williams	Minister for Justice (and Customs); 1997–2001	Succeeded by Chris Ellison
Preceded by Jocelyn Newman	Minister for Family and Community Services; 2001–03	Succeeded by Kay Patterson
Preceded by Jocelyn Newman	Minister assisting the Prime; Minister for the Status of Women; 2001–03	Succeeded by Kay Patterson
Preceded by Philip Ruddock	Minister for Immigration and Multicultural (and Indigenous) Affairs; 2003–07	Succeeded by Kevin Andrews
Diplomatic posts
Preceded by Peter Woolcott	Australian Ambassador to Italy; 2007 – 2010	Succeeded by David Ritchie
