= Department of Immigration and Citizenship =

Australian government department, 2007–2013

Department overview
- Formed: 30 January 2007; 19 years ago
- Preceding Department: Department of Immigration and Multicultural Affairs (II)
- Dissolved: 18 September 2013
- Superseding Department: Department of Immigration and Border Protection
- Jurisdiction: Commonwealth of Australia
- Headquarters: Canberra
- Employees: 8,811 (April 2013)
- Annual budget: A$1.9 billion (2008–09 estimate)
- Ministers responsible: Chris Evans, Minister for Immigration and Citizenship (2007–2010); Chris Bowen, Minister for Immigration and Citizenship (2010–2013)
- Department executives: Andrew Metcalfe, Secretary (2007–2012); Martin Bowles, Acting Secretary (2012–2013)
- Website: border.gov.au

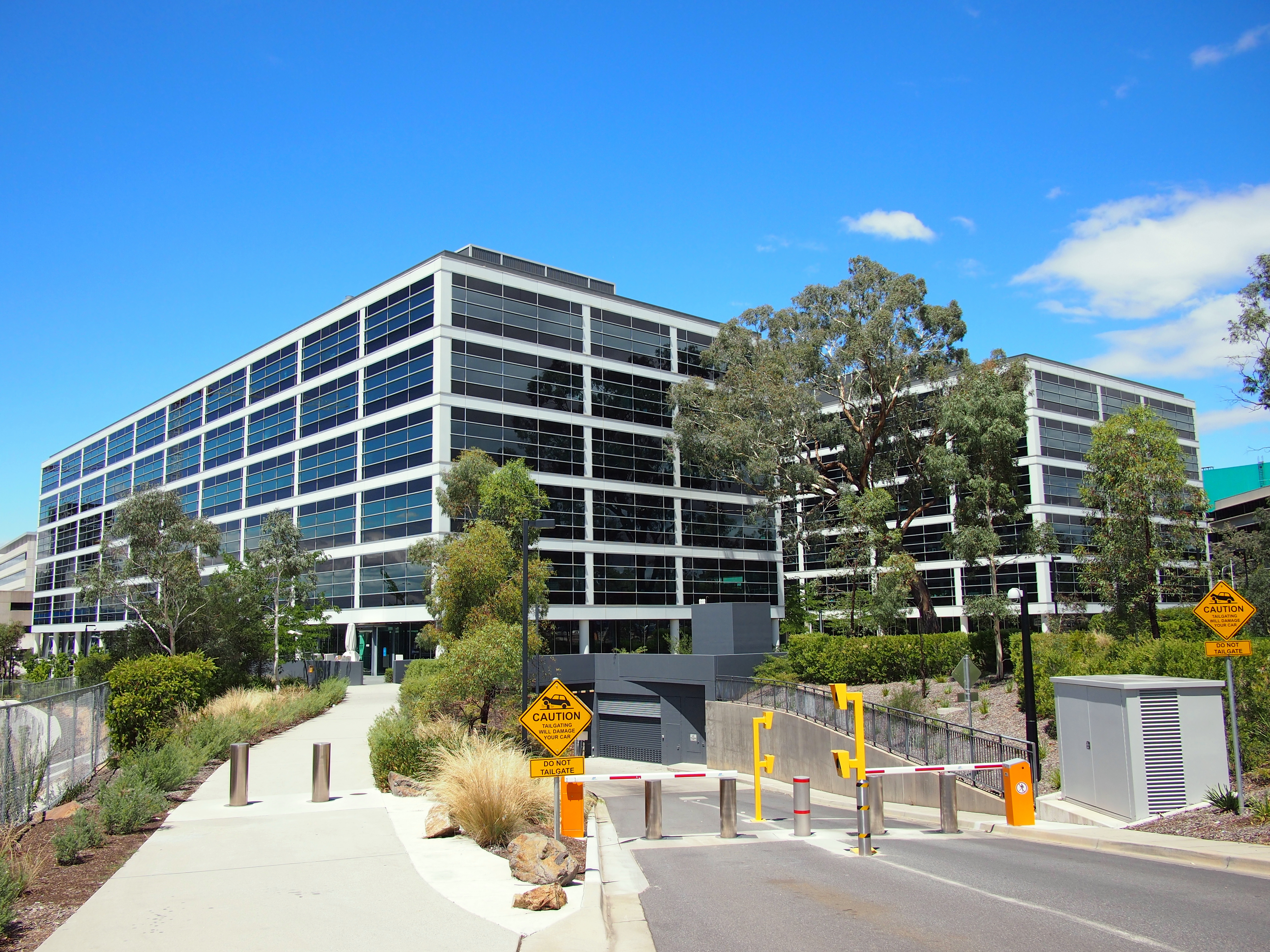
Previous headquarters of the Department of Immigration and Citizenship in Belconnen, Canberra.

The Department of Immigration and Citizenship (DIAC) was an Australian government department that existed between January 2007 and September 2013, that was preceded by the Department of Immigration and Multicultural Affairs and was succeeded by the Department of Immigration and Border Protection.

== Scope ==
Information about the department's functions and government funding allocation could be found in the Administrative Arrangements Orders, the annual Portfolio Budget Statements, in the department's annual reports and on the department's website.

According to the Administrative Arrangements Order made on 3 December 2007, the department dealt with:

- Entry, stay and departure arrangements for non-citizens
- Border immigration control
- Arrangements for the settlement of migrants and humanitarian entrants, other than migrant child education
- Citizenship
- Ethnic affairs
- Multicultural affairs

== Structure ==
The department was an Australian Public Service department, staffed by officials who were responsible to the Minister for Immigration and Citizenship. The secretary of the department was at first Andrew Metcalfe (until 2012), then (acting in the position) Martin Bowles. Bowles was appointed permanent secretary in early 2013.

Against this plaintiff.
