= Immigration detention in Australia =

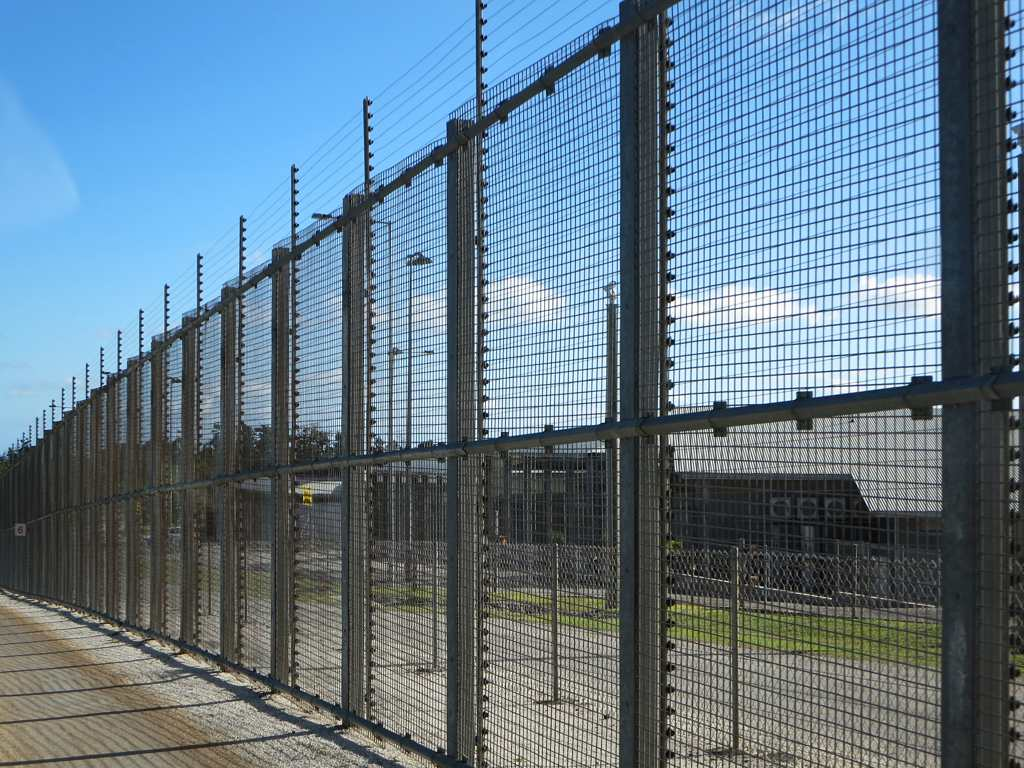
Fencing surrounding the detention centre on Christmas Island

The Australian government detains non-citizens under the control of the Department of Home Affairs, principally through the Australian Border Force (ABF). Detention is mandatory: section 189 of the Migration Act 1958 provides that any person reasonably suspected of being an unlawful non-citizen must be detained, and section 196 provides that they must be kept in detention until removed, deported or granted a visa. The regime captures both people who arrive without a valid visa and people who arrive lawfully and later become unlawful through visa expiry or cancellation, including cancellation on character grounds under section 501. No statutory time limit applies, and judicial review is limited; release generally depends on the grant of a bridging visa or on a ministerial residence determination allowing a person to live in the community.

According to the Global Detention Project, Australia operates a severe and punitive system of mandatory, indefinite detention that distinguishes neither between adults and children nor between visa violators and asylum seekers, and in which private contractors paid billions to run the centres have been repeatedly criticised for abuse and for failing to provide services. As of March 2026, Home Affairs held detainees in six immigration detention centres: Villawood, Melbourne, Brisbane, Adelaide, Yongah Hill and Perth. There are also alternative places of detention, a category that includes hotels, apartments, hospitals, aged-care facilities and mental health inpatient units. As of 31 March 2026 there were 1,096 people in detention facilities, 85.1 per cent of whom had a criminal history, and a further 84 living in the community under a residence determination; the average period of detention was 451 consecutive days, and 6.1 per cent of detainees had been held for more than five years.

Australia's offshore detention regime has drawn sustained international condemnation. Under the Pacific Solution begun in 2001 and revived in 2012, asylum seekers intercepted at sea were transferred to regional processing centres on Manus Island in Papua New Guinea and on Nauru, where the UNHCR, Amnesty International and Human Rights Watch documented harsh conditions and mistreatment. In April 2016, in Namah v Pato, the PNG Supreme Court held that detention at Manus breached the constitutional right to personal liberty; the centre closed on 31 October 2017 amid the cutting of power, water and medical services. The Guardian's 2016 publication of the "Nauru files", more than half of which concerned children, prompted further scrutiny, and in 2017 the government settled a class action brought by 1,905 Manus detainees for A$52.7 million. A United Nations report found systematic violations of the Convention Against Torture, and the policy has been scaled back following fourteen detainee deaths, multiple suicide attempts and at least six referrals to the International Criminal Court.

However, Nauru Regional Processing Centre in 2026 was still working.

== Length of detention ==
Australian immigration detention is not subject to a fixed statutory maximum duration. Under the Migration Act 1958, an unlawful non-citizen is generally required to remain in immigration detention until they are removed from Australia or granted a visa. However, the High Court of Australia held in NZYQ v Minister for Immigration, Citizenship and Multicultural Affairs (2023) that the Constitution limits the duration of detention where there is no prospect of a person’s removal in the foreseeable future.

The average length of time spent in immigration detention had steadily increased over the past decade until 2022, hitting a peak of over 800 days, before declining to 456 days as of August 2026. The Australian Department of Home Affairs provides updated monthly detention statistics.

In some cases, people have been held in detention for over 10 years, such as Ghader Mohamed, an Ahwazi man from Iran who has been detained since 2010, and Said Imasi, a stateless man born in Western Sahara. In 2023, after more than 13 years in detention, Imasi was released from Villawood Detention Centre.

In June 2019, it was revealed that a Tamil man from Sri Lanka had been held in detention for 9 years. The man, who was blind, as well as mentally and physically disabled, was being held in Villawood Detention Centre at the time of publishing. In 2002–2003, the man was captured by the Sri Lankan Army and tortured, after which he fled the country. He was recognised as a refugee by Australia, but received an adverse security assessment from Australian Security Intelligence Organisation (ASIO).

== History of mandatory detention ==
Mandatory detention of asylum seekers (so called, "unlawful arrivals") in Australia was established by the Keating government by the Migration Reform Act 1992 which came into operation on 1 September 1994. It was originally intended as an interim measure. Controls on unauthorised arrivals were tightened under the subsequent Howard government, including under the Pacific Solution policy, contributing to a sharp decline in boat arrivals and, consequently, to numbers of people being detained. The Pacific Solution was dismantled by the Rudd government and partially restored under the Gillard government in response to increased boat arrivals and reported deaths at sea.

Mandatory detention was introduced to "support the integrity of Australia's immigration program" and "management of Australian borders" and to distinguish between those who have submitted themselves to offshore entry processes prior to arrival and those who have not. Under the policy, asylum seekers are mandatorily detained while they "undergo an assessment process, including security and health checking, to establish if they have a legitimate reason for staying in Australia".

=== Keating government (1992–1996) ===
Before 1992, the Migration Legislation Amendment Act 1989 had created a regime of administrative detention of unlawful boat arrivals. Although officers were obligated to arrest and detain anyone suspected of being an ‘illegal entrant’, detention was discretionary. Between November 1989 and January 1994, there was a "second wave" of unauthorised boat arrivals comprising eighteen boats carrying 735 people (predominantly Cambodian nationals).

By June 1992, there were 478 people in immigration detention of whom 421 were boat arrivals (including 306 Cambodians), compared to five in immigration detention in January 1985. The Keating government's interim measures in 1992 were contained in the Migration Amendment Act 1992, which set up a regime of mandatory detention, with bipartisan support. Immigration Minister Gerry Hand told Parliament in his Second Reading Speech:

The Government is determined that a clear signal be sent that migration to Australia may not be achieved by simply arriving in this country and expecting to be allowed into the community ... this legislation is only intended to be an interim measure.

The Migration Amendment Act 1992 did impose a 273-day limit on detention, but specifically disallowed judicial review. The final scheme was contained in the Migration Reform Act 1992, which came into operation on 1 September 1994, which broadened the application of mandatory detention to all who did not hold a valid visa, and removed the 273-day detention limit. The Act also introduced detention charges (detention debts) whereby an unlawful non-citizen was liable for the costs of his or her immigration detention.

Non-citizens in Australia without a valid visa were to be considered unlawful and would have to be held in detention, though those who met certain criteria and were not considered flight or security risks could secure lawful status by means of a bridging visa – but bridging visas would not be made available to those who arrived in Australia without visas in the first place (such as boat arrivals). The government argued that this distinction was justifiable because visa overstayers had already submitted themselves to proper entry processing offshore and were therefore in a different category to those who had not and that boat arrivals had demonstrated a high likelihood of absconding where detention was not in place.

=== Howard government (1996–2007) ===
The Liberal-National Party Coalition led by John Howard defeated the Keating government in the 1996 federal election. In 1999 the Howard government created the temporary protection visa category for asylum seekers whose claims for refugee status had been accepted. These visas were granted only to unauthorised arrivals and were criticised because they left the refugee in limbo indefinitely. These people did not have rights to work, to family reunion, a right to return to Australia if they left, and their status was to be reviewed every three years.

Australia's immigration policies towards asylum seekers were a significant issue in the 2001 federal election. Howard said in a campaign policy speech:

[W]e are a generous open-hearted people taking more refugees on a per capita basis than any nation except Canada. We have a proud record of welcoming people from 140 different nations. But we will decide who comes to this country and the circumstances in which they come... We will be compassionate, we will save lives, we will care for people but we will decide, and nobody else, who comes to this country.

— Prime Minister John Howard, 28 October 2001

The Tampa affair arose during the election campaign. Following the election, the Howard government made significant changes to Australia's immigration policy. It put in place a policy known as the Pacific Solution, which was enacted via an amendment to the Migration Act 1958, the Migration Legislation Amendment (Excision from the Migration Zone) (Consequential Provisions) Act 2001 reinforced the practice of mandatory detention, providing for the indefinite detention of asylum seekers. The policy was implemented by then Australian Immigration Minister Philip Ruddock. Under this policy, many islands were excised from the Australian migration zone, and asylum seekers were removed to third countries to determine their refugee status, namely at detention camps on small island nations in the Pacific Ocean. Also, a policy of turning back boats where possible was instigated. Howard's policies were often controversial, were criticised by some human rights groups and were the subject of protest both within and without detention centres. Through the final years of the Howard government, Australia's detention facilities were near empty, few boat voyages were being attempted and the practice of detention of children had been ended.

Also in 2001, the Border Protection Bill provided the government with the power to remove any ship in the territorial waters of Australia, use reasonable force to do so, provide that any person who was on the ship be forcibly returned to the ship, and guaranteed that no asylum applications may be made by people on board the ship.

Mandatory detention of asylum seekers was popular with sections of the Australian electorate. Some commentators argue that it helped Howard win the 2001 federal election. While the Australian Labor Party supported the policy as Opposition, in June 2005 a small backbench revolt in Howard's party led by Petro Georgiou and Judi Moylan resulted in some concessions to humanitarian concerns, including the promised release of long-term detainees and review of future cases by an ombudsman.

Many of those detained in Australia's detention centres between 1999–2006 have been asylum seekers from Iraq and Afghanistan who sought protection or asylum under Australia's obligations to the United Nations Convention Relating to the Status of Refugees. More than 80 percent of these were found to be refugees by the Immigration Department, with some decisions taking more than 8 months. Few asylum seekers were able to be repatriated.

On 6 August 2004, the High Court of Australia handed down its decision in the case of Behrooz v Secretary, Department of Immigration and Multicultural and Indigenous Affairs and held that the harsh conditions of detention did not render the detention unlawful. On the same day, the High Court also handed down its decision in Al-Kateb v Godwin which held that unsuccessful asylum seekers who could not be removed to another country, despite their wish to leave Australia, could continue to be held in immigration detention indefinitely.

==== National Inquiry into Children in Immigration Detention ====
Dr Sev Ozdowski OAM Human Rights Commissioner of the Human Rights and Equal Opportunity Commission (HREOC, now the Australian Human Rights Commission) held an inquiry into mandatory detention of children who arrived without a valid visa over the period 1999–2002 (with updates where possible – the report was completed in April 2004) . The vast majority of children arrived and were put into mandatory detention facilities with their families for indefinite periods of time with no real opportunity to argue their case before independent tribunal or court. The inquiry found that between 1 July 1999 and 30 June 2003, 2184 children were detained after arriving in Australia seeking asylum without a visa. Approximately 14% of those children came to Australia alone (unaccompanied children). Most of them came from Iraq, Iran and Afghanistan. Almost 98 percent of the Iraqi children were recognised as refugees.

The inquiry found that children detained for long periods of time were at a high risk of suffering mental illness. Mental health professionals had repeatedly recommended that children and their parents be removed from immigration detention. The inquiry found that the Australian government's refusal to implement these recommendations amounted to "..cruel, inhumane and degrading treatment of those children in detention".

The inquiry also found that many basic rights outlined in the Convention on the Rights of the Child were denied to children living in immigration detention.

The key recommendations of the Inquiry were that children with their parents be released immediately into the community and that detention laws should be amended to comply with the Convention on the Rights of the Child. The Howard government released the children and introduced limited changes to Migration Act 1958 as a result of the report.

==== Criticism ====
In October 2001, Human Rights Watch sent a letter to Australian Prime Minister John Howard regarding new legislation, the Migration Amendment (Excision from Migration Zone) (Consequential Provisions) Act 2001. The new act further strengthened the practice of mandatory detention, allowing for indefinite detention of unauthorised arrivals. The letter said:

The recent legislation seriously contravenes Australia’s obligations to non-citizens, refugees and asylum seekers under international human rights and refugee law. As provided for in Article 2 of the ICCPR, the obligation to respect and ensure rights to all persons, including all non-citizens, applies throughout Australia’s territory and to all persons subject to Australia’s jurisdiction. We urge Australia, as we have already urged the US government in similar circumstances, to amend its new legislation or at a minimum to implement it in a manner that fully upholds fundamental norms of international human rights and refugee law.

The system of mandatory detention has been the subject of controversy. Opposition to the system on humanitarian grounds came from a range of religious, community and political groups including the National Council of Churches, Amnesty International, Australian Democrats, Australian Greens and Rural Australians for Refugees. Among the intellectual opponents of the system has been Professor Robert Manne, whose Quarterly Essay "Sending Them Home: Refugees and the New Politics of Indifference" (2004) called for an end to both mandatory detention and the temporary protection visa system on humanitarian grounds.

Throughout the controversy, Prime Minister John Howard and successive immigration ministers maintained that their actions were justified in the interests of protecting Australia's borders and ensuring that immigration law was enforced. A 2004 Liberal Party election policy document stated:

The Coalition government's tough stance on people smuggling stems from the core belief that Australia has the right to decide who comes to this country and the circumstances in which they come. Deterrence has been achieved through excision, boat returns, offshore processing and mandatory detention.

=== First Rudd government (2007–2010) ===
For the final few years of the Howard government, Indonesian boats carrying asylum seekers to Australia had virtually ceased and Australia's offshore detention centres were near empty. The newly elected Rudd government, under Immigration Minister Chris Evans, announced a series of measures aimed at achieving what it described as a more "compassionate policy". The Pacific Solution had involved offshore processing, a system of "temporary protection visas" for unauthorised arrivals, and a policy of turning back boats where possible. The Rudd government dismantled all three components, dubbing them "ineffectual and wasteful". Throughout 2009–2010, a flow of boat arrivals re-emerged.

In July 2008, the Australian government announced it was ending its policy of automatic detention for asylum seekers who arrive in the country without visas. While it remained committed to the policy of mandatory detention as an "essential component of strong border control", the Rudd government announced that detention would now be restricted to unlawful non-citizens who pose a threat to the community, those who refuse to comply with visa conditions, or those who need to be detained for the period of conducting health, identity and security checks. By 29 June 2011, the Australian Government had delivered on its commitment to move the majority of children in immigration detention into community–based arrangements.

The Government announced that aspects of the original detention system in Australia would remain, but asylum seekers will be released more quickly. They would only be detained for lengthier time periods if they are deemed to pose a risk to the wider community or have repeatedly breached their visa conditions. "Boat people" in excised areas will still be subject to mandatory detention and processed offshore, but the Government will move to hasten the process. Boat people will also be able to access legal advice and apply for an independent review of adverse decisions. Each detainee's circumstances and justification for ongoing detention will be scrutinised by the Immigration Ombudsman every six months. A Migration Amendment (Immigration Detention Reform) Bill 2009 to make these amendments, was introduced but lapsed without being passed.

The Migration Amendment (Abolishing Detention Debt) Act 2009 was passed by the Australian House of Representatives with several Liberal MPs threatening to 'cross the floor' and vote with Labor, and then passed into law on 8 September when the Senate passed the bill with the support of Senator Nick Xenophon, the Australian Greens, Liberal Senator Judith Troeth and at the last minute Steve Fielding. This act abolished the Keating-era policy whereby the government attempted to reclaim the costs of immigration detention from the detainee upon release.

Immigration Department figures in October 2009 showed no improvement in the speed of processing claims since the change of government. As a proportion of the immigration intake, Australia accepted fewer refugees in 2009 than it did at any time under the Howard government.

In October 2009, the MV Oceanic Viking was involved in an emergency operation rescuing 78 Sri Lankan asylum seekers in international waters within the Indonesian sea rescue zone. Those rescued were due to be landed in Indonesia, for transfer to an Australia-funded immigration detention centre on the Indonesian island of Bintan. However, the asylum seekers refused to disembark until 18 November, following assurances of fast-tracked processing of their cases for resettlement.

As of 29 March 2010, 100 asylum seeker boats had been intercepted within Australian waters during the life of the Rudd government.

On 9 April 2010, former Minister for Immigration Senator Chris Evans announced that, with immediate effect, no new applications for people from Afghanistan would be processed for six months; and for Sri Lankans, three months. Senator Evans was quoted as saying that this change would result in a higher rate of refusal of claims based on circumstances in these countries.

Following a complaint lodged in 2011 regarding the resulting indefinite detention, in 2013 the United Nations Human Rights Committee found Australia guilty of 138 counts of illegal detention, lack of judicial remedy, or inhumane or degrading treatment.

=== Gillard government (2010–2013) ===
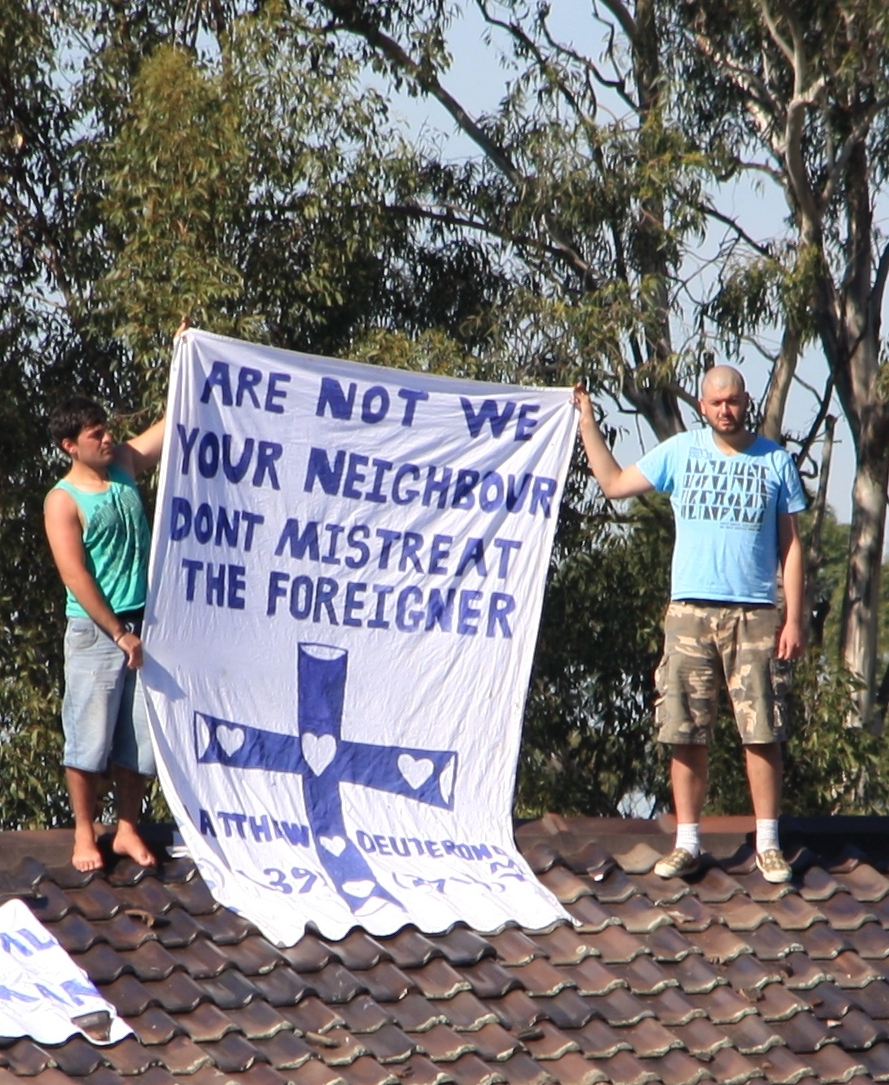
Protesters on the roof of the Villawood Immigration Detention Centre in Sydney, 2011

The Gillard government undertook a series of adjustments to Australia's system of mandatory detention amid a growing stream of unauthorised boat arrivals. Julia Gillard and immigration minister Chris Bowen mooted various regional options for asylum seeker processing – notably East Timor and Malaysia – before reverting to Nauru and Manus Island in late 2012.

On 18 October 2010, Julia Gillard announced that changes would be made to Australia's mandatory detention policy, and that more children and families would be moved out of immigration detention centres into community-based accommodation, such as centres run by churches and charities.

To accommodate the reduction in detainees, the federal government announced that they would open two new detention facilities – a centre in Northam, 80 kilometres north-east of Perth, and an alternative place of detention in Inverbrackie, 37 kilometres north of Adelaide. Northam will house up to 1,500 single men and Inverbrackie will house up to 400 family members.

In a press conference, Prime Minister Gillard told media "when we came to government we issued detention values about not having children in high security, behind razor wire, and obviously we have worked to deliver on those detention values." She went on to say, "obviously we want to see kids in school. I understand that in some particular cases the minister will work through this case by case, there may be some reasons why this may not always be possible, but in the ordinary course of things I want to see kids getting a good education."

According to the Immigration Department, as of February 2011, there are currently 5,061 men, 571 women and 1,027 children under 18 living in detention. The Sydney Morning Herald reports that 382 of those under 18 arrived without their parents.

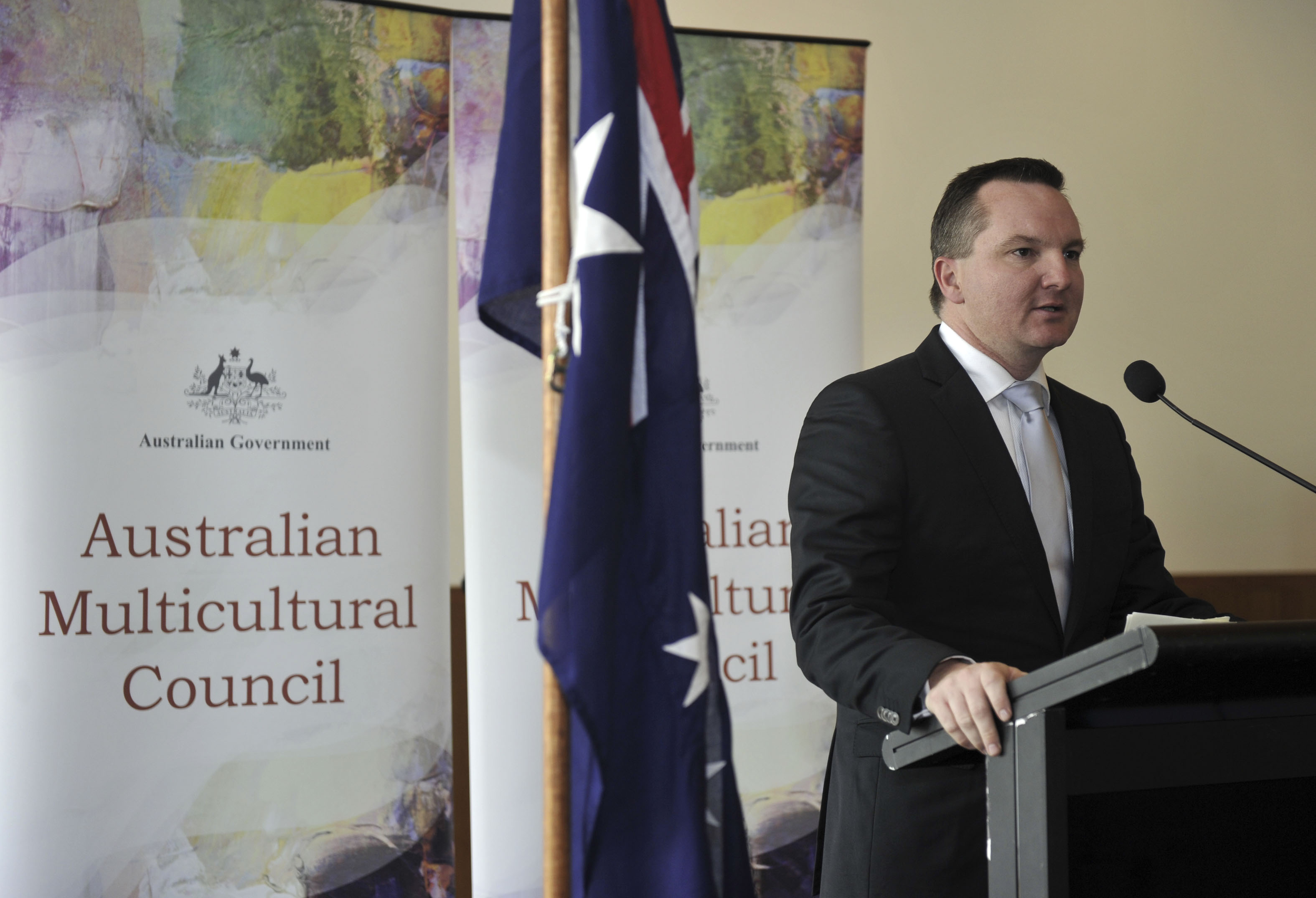
Chris Bowen, Minister for Immigration in the Gillard government oversaw a restoration of offshore processing of asylum seekers following the closure of the system by the Rudd government.

Department of Immigration and Citizenship statistics reflect that there were 4,783 people in immigration detention facilities and alternative places of detention, including 3,951 in immigration detention on the mainland and 832 in immigration detention on Christmas Island as at 31 January 2012. The number of people in immigration detention who arrived unlawfully by air or boat as at 31 January 2012 was 6,031, representing about 94 per cent of the total immigration detention population. There were also 344 people (about five per cent of the total immigration population) who arrived in Australia lawfully and were subsequently taken into immigration detention for either overstaying their visa conditions, resulting in visa cancellation.

Following an extended period of increasing boat arrivals and deaths at sea, in May 2011 Gillard announced that Australia and Malaysia were "finalising" an arrangement to exchange asylum seekers for processed refugees (the plan was dubbed the "Malaysia Solution"). On 31 August, the High Court ruled that the agreement to transfer refugees from Australia to Malaysia was invalid, and ordered that it not proceed on the basis that it contravened human rights protections established under existing laws. The Government was unable to secure the support of the Greens or Opposition in the Senate for modifications to enable the Malaysia Solution to proceed and instead reverted to expanding onshore processing arrangements. Continued deaths at sea and ongoing boat arrivals kept the issue at the fore of policy debate during the term of the Gillard government, leading to a major Parliamentary debate on the issue in June 2012, as news reports reached Canberra of another fatal sinking off Christmas Island. The government sought changes to the Migration Act, to allow asylum seekers to be processed in Malaysia. The Greens opposed the Bill outright and called for greater opening up of Australia's borders. The Opposition opposed the Bill on human rights grounds and called for restoration of the Howard government's policies. The government allowed the possibility of returning processing to Nauru, on the condition that Malaysia was also permitted.

Unable to secure passage of the Bill through Parliament following the emotional debate, the government convened a panel chaired by Angus Houston to consider options. The Houston Report found that "onshore processing encourages people to jump into boats" and called for the re-opening of offshore processing at Nauru and Manus Island. Gillard endorsed the plan in August 2012.

=== Second Rudd government (2013) ===
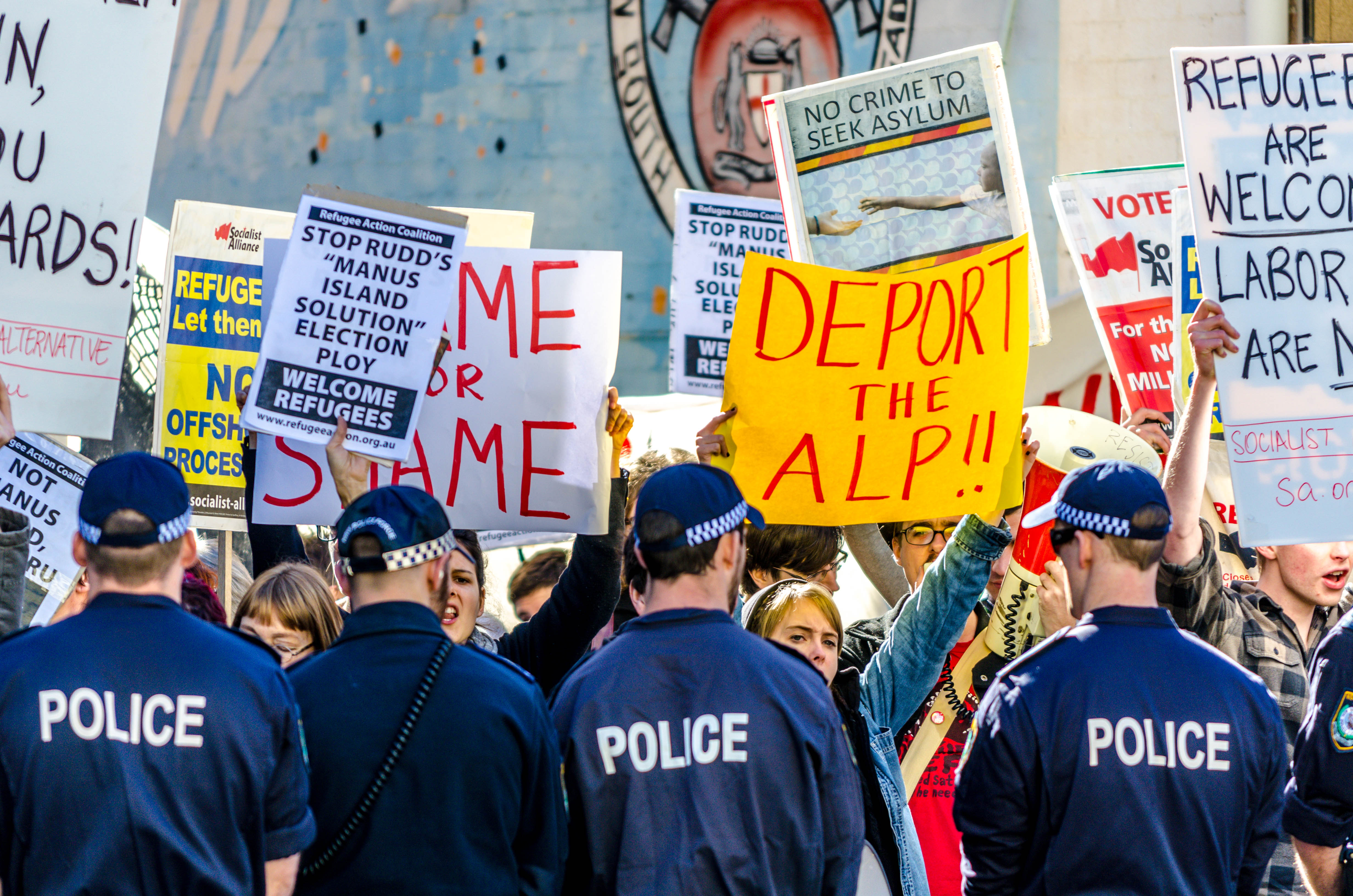
Protesters outside ALP caucus meeting in July 2013

On 19 July 2013 in a joint press conference with PNG Prime Minister Peter O'Neill and Australian Prime Minister Kevin Rudd detailed the Regional Resettlement Arrangement (RRA) between Australia and Papua New Guinea:

"From now on, any asylum seeker who arrives in Australia by boat will have no chance of being settled in Australia as refugees. Asylum seekers taken to Christmas Island will be sent to Manus and elsewhere in Papua New Guinea for assessment of their refugee status. If they are found to be genuine refugees they will be resettled in Papua New Guinea... If they are found not to be genuine refugees they may be repatriated to their country of origin or be sent to a safe third country other than Australia. These arrangements are contained within the Regional Resettlement Arrangement signed by myself and the Prime Minister of Papua New Guinea just now."

The actions taken by the Rudd government from July 2013 were the primary cause for the major reduction seen in boat arrivals over the 2013–2014 period, according to research conducted by former Immigration Department chief John Menadue and Australian National University migration expert Peter Hughes.

=== Abbott government (2013–2015) ===
During the 2013 federal election the Coalition parties led by Tony Abbott strongly campaigned on a "stop the boats" slogan. Following the election the newly elected Abbott government toughened policies to stop asylum seekers arriving by boat and launched Operation Sovereign Borders. A feature of the new government's policy was the total secrecy of the operations and treatment of persons intercepted at sea and those in immigration detention in general. The immigration minister stated that no immigrant who arrives in Australia by boat will be granted a visa, regardless of the legitimacy or otherwise of their claim. The Abbott government's policy was apparently successful because no IMAs have arrived in Australia since July 2014. The Abbot government also claimed responsibility for the overall decrease in boat arrivals during 2013 – 2014, however this was primarily due to policy enacted by the 2nd Rudd government (2013) shortly before the Abbott government took power in the 2013 Australian federal election. While this claim was incorrect, it was easy to effectively communicate as boat arrivals did decrease around the time of the Abbott government taking power.

In addition, the Abbott government has been more prepared to cancel visas on character grounds for people who have been lawfully present in Australia for some time, bringing them within the scope of the mandatory detention rules. Also, the Abbott government has passed legislation to strip Australian citizenship of dual nationals in some circumstances, rendering such persons non-citizens and subject to immigration detention for not holding a valid visa, and deportation.

In 2014, the Human Rights Commission published a report, The Forgotten Children, into children in Australian detention, both onshore and on Christmas Island, for the period January 2013 to September 2014 — covering the period of Labor and Coalition governments. The report was limited because the HRC was barred from visiting and inquiring as to the condition of children in offshore detention on Manus Island and Nauru. The report was damning of the treatment of children in immigration detention, at least in Australian territories.

In January 2015, the first refugees were moved out of Manus Island Regional Processing Center to a new detention centre near Lorengau on Manus Island, in the midst of a hunger strike.

The condition of detainees in Nauru was reported in the Moss Review. The final report was produced 6 February 2015, and released on 20 March 2015.

=== Turnbull government (2015–2018) ===
On 30 November 2015 there were 3,906 people in Australia's immigration detention, including people in immigration detention facilities in Australia and in Australian-run facilities in other countries. 585 of these were in community detention (a form of detention separate from actual immigration detention facilities) in Australia proper. 70 were children in offshore immigration detention facilities, such as Nauru.

The time asylum seekers spent in Australian detention centres as stated by the Department of Immigration and Border Protection show that in December 2015 people in onshore immigration detention had been there for an average 445 days. The average detention period has increased since May 2014. There were 1792 people in onshore detention, including 91 children, and most were from Iran, New Zealand, Sri Lanka, China, Vietnam and Afghanistan.

On 26 April 2016, the Supreme Court of Papua New Guinea ruled that detention of asylum seekers on Manus Island was breaching their constitutional right to freedom and thus illegal, and ordered the Australian-run detention centre to close. However, Immigration Minister Peter Dutton iterated that the 850 asylum seekers were the responsibility of Papua New Guinea and would not come to Australia.

In September 2017, the Department of Immigration awarded a $423 million contract to Paladin Group, a little-known private military contractor, to manage the new centers at Lorengau. The closed-tender process of awarding of the contract, as well as Paladin's past record, attracted widespread criticism and controversy.

In November 2017, the last refugees in the Manus Island Regional Processing Centre were forcibly removed to West Lorengau Haus, Hillside Haus and East Lorengau Refugee Transit Center in Lorengau. Doctors Without Borders was denied access to asylum seekers and refugees.

On 20 December 2017, Peter Dutton was appointed Minister for Home Affairs, in charge of the newly-created Department of Home Affairs, to be responsible for national security, law enforcement, emergency management, transport security, border control, and immigration functions.

=== Morrison government (August 2018–2022) ===
Morrison, with Dutton still in place as Minister for Home Affairs, continued the policies of the previous Coalition governments towards asylum seekers, although they did promise to ensure that all children would be off Nauru by the end of 2018.

==== Medevac bill ====
On 12 February 2019, the Morrison government suffered the first substantive defeat on the floor of the House of Representatives since 1929, after the Labor Party and several cross-benchers supported amendments to the Home Affairs Legislation Amendment (Miscellaneous Measures) Bill 2018 (the Home Affairs Bill) proposed by the Senate. The proposed amendments would give greater weight to medical opinion in allowing the medical evacuation of asylum seekers to Australia from Nauru (in the Nauru Regional Processing Centre) and Manus Island (in the Manus Regional Processing Centre). Further amendments followed negotiations between the Opposition and the House of Reps cross-bench members, before the Senate considered and agreed to the amendments to its original amendments on the following day, 13 February. The proposed amendments would affect three laws, being the Migration Act 1958, the Customs Act 1901 and the Passenger Movement Charge Collection Act 1978. The amended legislation, which had become known as "the Medevac Bill", passed in the House by 75 votes to 74 and passed in the Senate by 36 votes to 34, being passed as the Home Affairs Legislation Amendment (Miscellaneous Measures) Act 2019.

The approval of two doctors is required, but approval may still be overridden by the home affairs minister in one of three areas. Human rights advocates hailed the decision, with one calling it a “tipping point as a country”, with the weight of public opinion believing that sick people need treatment.

In response to the bill passing into law, Scott Morrison announced the re-opening of the Christmas Island detention centre, intimating that this change in the law would provide the signal that people smugglers to begin operating again. In the days following, Dutton said that because of this change in the law, Australians on waiting lists for hospital treatment and those already in public housing were going to be adversely affected.

This was seen by Robert Manne as a turning point in Labor Party policy, after having had almost identical asylum seeker policies as the Coalition for the past five years. He also points out the numerous obstacles any potential people smuggler or asylum seeker would have to face, because the deterrent aspects of the policy are still firmly in place, and the new legislation applies only to the approximately 1000 people still on Nauru and Manus (of whom only a relatively small number will be allowed to access the urgent medical attention they need).

However, the 2018 ruling was overturned in December 2019, after 37 votes to 35 supported the government's move to repeal the law.

==== Move into detention (Aug 2019) ====
In August 2019, PNG’s immigration department transferred more than 50 men deemed to be non-refugees to the Bomana Immigration Centre, a detention centre next to the Bomana Prison in Port Moresby. Boochani reported that some men had been approved for a Medevac transfer, and were most likely being targeted. PNG officials said that they continued to encourage non-refugees to depart voluntarily. About 100 men are unable to be deported because their country of citizenship refuses to accept involuntary returns. Ian Rintoul said that many of those being detained are being deemed not to be refugees even though they have never had a refugee determination in PNG.

=== Albanese government (2023-2025) ===
Immigration detention policy in Australia changed fundamentally in 2023 following the High Court's landmark decision in NZYQ v Minister for Immigration (2023). The Court ruled that detaining a non-citizen indefinitely when there is no real prospect of removal is unlawful, overturning a legal precedent that had allowed potentially lifelong administrative detention. As a direct result, in late 2023 the federal government released around 200 people from long-term immigration detention, many of whom had been detained for years.

In 2024, the Albanese government introduced a series of legislative amendments to strengthen visa conditions, monitoring powers, and compliance mechanisms for people released from detention following NZYQ. While these measures aimed to reassure the public and prevent re-detention without lawful basis, they did not significantly reduce the overall reliance on immigration detention. Government statistics showed that detention numbers remained broadly stable at around 900 to 1,000 people, with average detention periods continuing to exceed one year. Human rights groups criticised the detention conditions, highlighting ongoing mental health harms, prolonged uncertainty, and the continued use of detention as a routine administrative tool rather than a measure of last resort.

In April 2025, the High Court clarified that the government retains the power to detain non-citizens while visa processes are underway, even if removal is not imminent, provided the detention remains connected to a legitimate migration purpose. Detention numbers in early to mid-2025 remained close to 1,000 people, including a small number of children, and Australia continued to record some of the longest average detention periods among comparable countries. The year also saw renewed reliance on third-country arrangements, with Australia finalising a major financial and resettlement agreement with Nauru for people unable to remain in Australia or be returned to their countries of origin.

== Criticism of government policy: 2010s ==
Recent global developments highlight the growing polarisation of the Australian public in relation to their government's policies. From late 2009, the increase in arrivals by boat fuelled a divide in public perception of people seeking asylum between sympathy and apathy. Following election victory by the Liberal/National coalition in 2013, the government mandatory detention policy has been widely criticised. Protests against government policy continued to take place around Australia including activists disrupting the Australian Open men's tennis final in 2015. Demonstrators in the crowd and on court raised banners and wore t-shirts that read “Australia open for refugees”.

The Refugee Council viewed the immigration detention program as detrimental to Australia's interests in three ways: the people subjected to the detention programs endure inhumane conditions; those working in the detention centres often subjected to emotionally jarring situations; and Australia's reputation as a fair and just nation has been eroded. Timing is also of concern, with many refugees and asylum seekers reporting being detained for several years before receiving status determination from the government. The government often cites deterrence to frame the context in which their policies operate.

While the immigration detention program draws some support from the Australian public, the program's treatment of children in detention has been widely criticised. There has been great concern about the adverse impact detention centres have on the health, well-being and development of children. Particularly worrying was the use of detention centres previously used for adults to house children. Wickman Point, one such Alternative Place of Detention (APOD) was previously deemed only suitable for adults, with reports that children had been brought in to live concurrently with the adult population.

Re-detention occurs when those being detained by the immigration program are released on Temporary Protection Visas (TPVs) while their refugee status is being determined, or who have succeeded in obtaining refugee status and subsequently re-detained for often minor violations, sometimes with lack of access to legal advice. Unaccompanied children have been removed from care in the community and re-detained in closed communities.

=== 2019: Report urges changes to policy ===
On 13 June, the Andrew & Renata Kaldor Centre for International Refugee Law at the University of New South Wales published a paper citing seven principles which should be key to Australia's refugee policy, supported by law and evidence-based research. Professor Jane McAdam, director of the Centre, said that in the last 25 years, policy has changed direction, and that offshore processing, boat turnbacks and mandatory detention "not only deny the humanity to people that applied and deflect problems elsewhere, but also violate many of our obligations under international law”.

== Human rights violations ==
In early 2025, the United Nations Human Rights Committee issued a landmark finding that Australia had violated international human rights law by detaining asylum seekers, including children, on the Pacific island of Nauru, even after they had been granted refugee status. The Committee determined that Australia breached at least two key provisions of the 1966 International Covenant on Civil and Political Rights (ICCPR): the prohibition on arbitrary detention and the right of detained individuals to challenge their detention before a court. In two separate cases involving 25 refugees and asylum seekers who arrived by boat more than a decade earlier, the Committee found that these individuals, including unaccompanied minors, were held in conditions that lacked basic necessities, such as adequate healthcare and water, and suffered significant deterioration in health and well-being. Nearly all of the minors experienced weight loss, insomnia, self‑harm, and other serious impacts on their physical and mental health while detained on Nauru, even after they were formally recognised as refugees. The Committee emphasised that Australia retained jurisdiction and human rights obligations for people in Nauru's regional processing centre because it had arranged, funded, and maintained significant operational control over the facility, rejecting Australia's position that rights obligations did not apply outside its territory. As a result, the Committee called on the Australian Government to provide adequate compensation to those affected and to take concrete steps to prevent future violations.

On January 9, 2025 the United Nations Human Rights Committee issued a finding concerning the case of an Iranian asylum seeker who had been transferred by Australia to the Nauru Regional Processing Centre after arriving by boat in 2013. Although she was granted refugee status in 2017, she remained detained on Nauru and was moved to mainland Australia in 2018 for medical treatment, where she continued to face detention. The Committee determined that Australia had violated the International Covenant on Civil and Political Rights (ICCPR), specifically the prohibition on arbitrary detention and the right to challenge detention before a court. The Committee called on the Australian Government to provide adequate compensation and to take steps to prevent future violations.

== Deaths in detention ==
From 2000–2018, there have been dozens of deaths in Australia's immigration detention facilities, as many as 20 of those were suicide. In one case, a man died after publicly setting himself on fire in Nauru Regional Processing Centre to protest how he was being treated. Several more people have committed suicide after release, due to mental health issues connected with their being detained.

== Cases of wrongful immigration detention ==
In February 2005, it was revealed that a mentally ill German citizen holding Australian permanent residency, Cornelia Rau, had been held in immigration detention as an unauthorised immigrant for 11 months, after identifying herself as a backpacker from Munich under the name of Anna Brotmeyer.

An audit in May 2005 revealed 33 cases of people wrongfully detained under the Migration Act 1958. This included the case of a woman, Australian citizen Vivian Alvarez Solon, who was forcibly deported to the Philippines and who subsequently went missing. As of May, it was not known how many actually spent time in an immigration detention facility. By late May, Immigration Minister Amanda Vanstone announced that more than 200 cases of possible wrongful immigration detention had been referred to the Palmer Inquiry. In October 2005, the Commonwealth Ombudsman revealed that more than half of those cases were held for a week or less and 23 people were held for more than a year and two of them were detained for more than five years. Australia's longest-serving detainee in immigration detention was at the time, Peter Qasim who was detained for almost 7 years before being released in 2005 on a bridging visa. However there has since been prisoners held for longer.

In 2006, the federal government made a $400,000 compensation payout to an 11-year-old Iranian boy, Shayan Badraie, for the psychological harm he suffered while being detained in Woomera and Villawood detention centres between 2000 and 2002.

In 2021, the Australian government was ordered to pay an Iraqi asylum seeker $350,000 in damages for unlawfully detaining him for more than two years.

== See also ==
- Ads Up Refugee Network
- Asylum in Australia
- Australian League of Immigration Volunteers
- Australian migration zone
- Boat arrivals in Australia 1976–2013
- Immigration detention
- Immigrant health in Australia
- List of Australian immigration detention facilities
- Operation Sovereign Borders
- Pacific Solution
- List of Sri Lankan Tamil Asylum Seeker Suicides in Australia
- Stateless, a 2020 television miniseries
