= ARV =

ARV may refer to:

- Antiretroviral drug, any drug used to treat retroviral infections, primarily in the management of HIV/AIDS
- arv, ISO 639-3 language code for the Arbore language, an East Cushitic language
- Average rectified value, in mathematics and electrical engineering, the average of an absolute value
- After-repair value, estimated of the value of a real estate property after repair for flipping
- ARV, IATA code for Lakeland Airport in Minocqua and Woodruff, Wisconsin
- Al Rojo Vivo (Telemundo), a Spanish-language afternoon news magazine program on Telemundo
- Australian Refugee Volunteers, formerly the Australian League of Immigration Volunteers
- Arv, Nordic Yearbook of Folklore, published by the Royal Gustavus Adolphus Academy
- Arv (album), a 2008 album by the Norwegian Viking/folk metal band Ásmegin
- ARV Sculling, an Antwerp rowing club

== Vehicles ==
- A US Navy hull classification symbol: Aircraft repair ship (ARV, ARV(E), ARV(A))
- Advanced Reconnaissance Vehicle, an armored reconnaissance vehicle program for the United States Marine Corps
- Advanced Re-entry Vehicle, a proposed crewed ESA spacecraft
- Armed response vehicle, a type of police car operated by the British police
- Armoured recovery vehicle, a military vehicle used to repair or recover other military vehicles
- Ammunition Resupply Vehicle, a military support vehicle for self-propelled howitzers fielded by South Korea
- XM1219 armed robotic vehicle, an unmanned military vehicle of the United States Army
- ARV, former British aircraft manufacturer (1985–1989), originator of the ARV Super2, a light aircraft
- Axiom Return Vehicle, a fictional spaceship in the 2008 film WALL-E
