= Chu Kheng Lim v Minister =

1992 High Court of Australia ruling

- Court: High Court of Australia
- Full case name: Chu Kheng Lim and Others v The Minister for Immigration, Local Government and Ethnic Affairs and Another
- Decided: December 8, 1992
- Citations: [1992] HCA 64; 176 CLR 1

Court membership
- Judges sitting: Chief Justice Anthony Mason; Justice Gerard Brennan; Justice William Deane; Justice Daryl Dawson; Justice John Toohey; Justice Mary Gaudron; Justice Michael McHugh

Case opinions
- The executive branch may detain persons for non-punitive purposes. Only the judiciary branch can detain persons punitively.

Laws applied
- Migration Act 1958 (Cth); Australian Constitution

Chu Kheng Lim v Minister for Immigration, Local Government and Ethnic Affairs is a ruling of the High Court of Australia regarding Australian immigration law, specifically the ability of the government to detain illegal immigrants. More broadly, the decision was a landmark ruling regarding the separation of powers in Australian constitutional law. The case established the Chu Kheng Lim principle, which states that the executive branch may only detain people for non-punitive purposes, and that only the judicial branch can detain people punitively.

The principle was bolstered by the 2023 decision NZYQ v Minister for Immigration, which added a temporal limit and reasonably necessary test to the Chu Kheng Lim principle, closing the infinite detention loophole created in Al-Kateb v Godwin in 2004.

== Background ==
Chu Kheng Lim and thirty-five other Cambodian nationals arrived in Australia illegally via two separate boats. (Note: Excluding one migrant, who was born in Australia after the original migration) The first group arrived c. 27 November 1989 and the second group arrived c. 31 March 1990. None of the migrants possessed valid entry permits. Their applications for refugee status were rejected in April 1992. They were detained in custody from their arrival.

In April 1992, the detainees were successful in seeking a judicial review of their refugee status. The Federal Court of Australia set aside the initial unsuccessful application and ordered the Migration Minister to reassess. On 5 May 1992, two days before the refugee status hearing, the Parliament of Australia amended the Migration Act 1958. This amendment required that all non-citizens who arrive into Australia by boat without a valid entry permit or visa be detained until they are removed from Australia or granted a valid entry permit. The amendment also prevented courts from overriding this compulsory detainment, effectively closing all avenues of judicial review.

The amendment to the Migration Act imposed the following provisions:

- Section 54K: defined a "designated person" as a non-citizen who arrived in Australia by boat between 19 November 1989 and 1 December 1992 without a visa or entry permit
- Section 54L: required that a designated person be kept in custody and only be released if they are removed from Australia or granted an entry permit
- Section 54R: provided that a court cannot order a person be released from the custody defined in 54L, effectively closing all avenues of judicial review

== Arguments ==
=== Plaintiffs (Cambodian nationals) ===
The plaintiffs argued that the amendment to the Migration Act was unconstitutional, saying that it violated the separation of powers required by chapter III of the Constitution of Australia by conferring judicial powers upon the executive branch. Applied, this means the executive was practicing judicial functions by detaining the migrants indefinitely without trial.

=== Respondent (Minister) ===
The respondent, Gerry Hand, the Minister for Immigration, Local Government and Ethnic Affairs, argued that the detention was not a punitive measure, but instead an administrative process part of Australia's immigration management policy. They stated that the purpose of the detention was not to punish the detainees, but instead prevent unlawful non-citizens from entering Australia.

== Judgement ==
Unanimously, the High Court found that sections 54K and 54L of the amendment to the Migration Act were valid under the Constitution. This meant that the detainment of the plaintiffs was constitutionally valid.

A majority (Mason CJ, Toohey and McHugh JJ in dissent) also found that section 54R was constitutionally invalid because it attempted to prevent a court from ordering the release of a "designated person", even when their detainment was unlawful. The majority held this was invalid, as it breached the courts' constitutionally-defined judicial powers. Mason CJ did agree that, at face value, this section was unconstitutional, but believed that in practice it could be read to only apply to lawful detention.

=== The Chu Kheng Lim principle: Mason CJ (Note: Mason CJ delivered his own assenting judgment, but was in agreement on this point), Brennan, Deane and Dawson JJ ===
The majority judgment of Brennan, Deane and Dawson JJ, with Mason CJ in agreement, composed what has become known as the Chu Kheng Lim principle. This is formulated in the judgment as follows: "The involuntary detention of a citizen in custody by the state is penal or punitive in character and, under our system of government, exists only as an incident of the exclusively judicial function of adjudging and punishing criminal guilt."

=== Gaudron J ===
Gaudron J provided an assenting agreement, stating that the new detention provisions (aside from 54R) were valid as they were 'reasonably appropriate and adapted' to the aliens power under section 51 of the Constitution, and therefore valid exercises of parliamentary power.
