= ASF17 v Commonwealth of Australia =

2024 decision of the High Court of Australia

- Court: High Court of Australia
- Decided: 10 May 2024
- Citation: [2024] HCA 40

Case history
- Related action: NZYQ v Minister for Immigration

Court membership
- Judges sitting: Gageler CJ, Gordon, Edelman, Steward, Gleeson, Jagot, Beech-Jones JJ

Case opinions
- Non-citizens who could be removed to their country of citizenship if they consented, yet refuse to consent despite being able, are not required to be released, due to removal being possible in the reasonably foreseeable future, unlike non-citizens in NZYQ, who could not be removed due to no country being willing to accept them.

Laws applied
- Migration Act 1958

ASF17 v Commonwealth of Australia is a 2024 decision of the High Court of Australia, notable in Australian constitutional law for upholding the legality of indefinite detention under the Migration Act 1958 when tied to a non-punitive purpose.

The court ruled that the indefinite detention of ASF17, an Iranian bisexual man refusing to cooperate with deportation to Iran, did not breach constitutional limits set in NZYQ v Minister for Immigration against punitive detention, as his removal remained reasonably achievable if he assisted authorities. Unlike in NZYQ, where deportation was unfeasible, the High Court found ASF17’s detention lawful under the Migration Act for the purpose of facilitating his departure, despite Iran’s policy of rejecting involuntary deportees. ASF17 claimed a fear of persecution in Iran due to his sexuality, but prior rulings, upheld by the High Court, determined this fear lacked a genuine basis, stemming from an incident deemed fabricated, thus disqualifying him from a protection visa and finding no breach of non-refoulement (non-return) obligations.
