= Al-Kateb v Godwin =

2004 decision of the High Court of Australia

- Court: High Court of Australia
- Full case name: Al-Kateb v Godwin & Ors
- Decided: 6 August 2004
- Citations: [2004] HCA 37, (2004) 219 CLR 562
- Transcripts: [2003] HCATrans 456 (12 November 2003), [2003] HCATrans 458 (13 November 2003)

Case history
- Prior actions: SHDB v Minister for Immigration and Multicultural and Indigenous Affairs [2003] FCA 30; SHDB v Godwin [2003] FCA 300

Court membership
- Judges sitting: Gleeson CJ, McHugh, Gummow, Kirby, Hayne, Callinan & Heydon JJ

Case opinions
- (4:3) The Migration Act, authorises unlawful non-citizens to be detained until they are removed from Australia, even when there is no prospect of their removal in the reasonably foreseeable future (per McHugh, Hayne, Callinan & Heydon JJ) (4:1) The detention of non-citizens by the Executive pursuant to ss 189, 196 and 198 did not contravene Ch III of the Commonwealth Constitution, even if the removal of the non-citizen from Australia was not reasonably practicable in the foreseeable future. (per McHugh, Hayne, Callinan and Heydon JJ) (2:1) The provisions of the Migration Act should not be interpreted by reference to international law (per Hayne & Callinan JJ; Kirby J dissenting)

Laws applied
- Overruled by
- NZYQ v Minister for Immigration

Al-Kateb v Godwin is a decision of the High Court of Australia, which ruled on 6 August 2004 that the indefinite detention of a stateless person was lawful, until it was overturned in 2023. The case concerned Ahmed Al-Kateb, a Palestinian man born in Kuwait, who moved to Australia in 2000 and applied for a temporary protection visa. The Commonwealth Minister for Immigration's decision to refuse the application was upheld by the Refugee Review Tribunal and the Federal Court. In 2002, Al-Kateb declared that he wished to return to Kuwait or Gaza. However, since no country would accept Al-Kateb, he was declared stateless and detained under the policy of mandatory detention.

The two main issues considered by the High Court were whether the Migration Act 1958 (the legislation governing immigration to Australia) permitted a person in Al-Kateb's situation to be detained indefinitely, and if so, whether this was permissible under the Constitution of Australia. A majority of the court decided that the Act did allow indefinite detention, and that the Act was not unconstitutional.

The controversy surrounding the outcome of the case resulted in a review of the circumstances of twenty-four stateless people in immigration detention. Al-Kateb and eight other stateless people were granted bridging visas in 2005 and while this meant they were released from detention, they were unable to work, study or obtain various government benefits. Al-Kateb was granted a permanent visa in October 2007.

In 2023, a subsequent High Court case, NZYQ v Minister for Immigration, overturned this decision, holding that infinite detention of non-citizens is punitive when there is no real prospect of removal from Australia, and therefore a breach of the separation of powers.

== Background to the case ==
Ahmed Al-Kateb was born in Kuwait in 1976, the son of Palestinian parents. Kuwait's Nationality Law is based on the citizenship of the parents, jus sanguinis, (Article 2) and does not provide for citizenship based on place of birth, jus soli, except in the case of foundlings (Article 3). For this reason Al-Kateb did not acquire Kuwaiti citizenship at birth, and was thus considered a stateless person. Al-Kateb left his country of birth after Kuwaiti authorities pressured nearly 200,000 Palestinians to leave Kuwait. In December 2000, Al-Kateb, travelling by boat, arrived in Australia without a visa or passport, and was taken into immigration detention under the provisions of the Migration Act 1958.

In January 2001, Al-Kateb applied for a protection visa, on the grounds that the United Nations 1954 Convention Relating to the Status of Stateless Persons obliged Australia to protect him. His application was rejected, a decision upheld by the Refugee Review Tribunal and the Federal Court of Australia. In June 2002, Al-Kateb stated that he wished to voluntarily leave Australia and be sent to Kuwait or to Gaza. However attempts by the Government of Australia to remove Al-Kateb to Egypt, Jordan, Kuwait, Syria, and the Palestinian territories (which would have required the approval of Israel) failed.

Al-Kateb then applied to the Federal Court for writs of habeas corpus and mandamus, demanding that immigration officials comply with section 198 of the Migration Act which required that Al-Kateb, because his application for a visa had been rejected, be removed from the country "as soon as reasonably practicable". However, those applications were dismissed. Al-Kateb then sought writs of habeas corpus and mandamus on the basis that he was being unlawfully detained, and although the judge found that "removal from Australia is not reasonably practicable at the present time as there is no real likelihood or prospect of removal in the reasonably foreseeable future", his application was dismissed. However, a case with substantially identical facts, decided twelve days later by a Full Court of the Federal Court, resulted in the release of another detainee, Akram Al Masri.

Finally, Al-Kateb appealed the decision against him to a Full Court of the Federal Court, hoping that the reasoning applied in the Al Masri case (which was factually similar to his situation) would be applied to him. The appeal was removed into the High Court at the request of the then Attorney-General of Australia Daryl Williams, under provisions of the Judiciary Act 1903. Pending the appeal, Al-Kateb was released in April 2003, by an interlocutory consent order of the Federal Court. The case was argued alongside two other cases which also concerned immigration detention and hearings were held on 12 November and 13 November 2003.

The respondents in the case were all members of the Government of Australia, including two officials in the Department of Immigration, Multicultural and Indigenous Affairs, and the then Minister for Immigration, Phillip Ruddock, and were represented by the Solicitor-General of Australia, David Bennett. The first named respondent, Philippa Godwin, was Deputy Secretary of DIMIA. Al-Kateb was represented by Claire O'Connor, from the Legal Services Commission of South Australia.

== Arguments ==
The question in the case was whether Al-Kateb's continued detention was lawful. That question involved several issues, namely whether the provisions of the Migration Act allow a person to be detained even if they have no prospect of being removed from Australia, and if they did, whether those provisions were then lawful under the Constitution of Australia.

=== Indefinite detention ===
Since Al-Kateb's application for a visa was rejected, he was classified as an unlawful non-citizen. Section 196 of the Migration Act provides that unlawful non-citizens can only be released from immigration detention if they are granted a visa, deported, or removed from Australia. Section 198(6) of the Act requires immigration officials to "remove [from Australia] as soon as reasonably practicable an unlawful non-citizen".

One possible interpretation of these provisions is that unlawful non-citizens should be kept in detention for as long as necessary to remove them, and that if removing them never became practicable, that they would be detained until death. In contrast, Al-Kateb argued that the provisions only allowed unlawful non-citizens to be detained while removal was a practical possibility, and that if removal was not a practical possibility, then they should be released from detention, at least while it remained impractical.

Much of the argument for Al-Kateb centred on the fact that he was a stateless man. Kateb's lawyer, O'Connor, noted that the provisions in the Migration Act about refugees were based on the United Nations Convention Relating to the Status of Refugees, both of which overlooked the situation of stateless persons. Several exchanges during the hearings illustrated the way in which the usual processes of the immigration system were not adapted well, if at all, to dealing with stateless people. In one such exchange, O'Connor referred to Al-Kateb both by his name and by the identifier used on the formal documents, "SHDB" (in matters concerning asylum seekers, names are usually suppressed in order to prevent persecution should they return to their country of origin). After some debate about whether to suppress Al-Kateb's name, Justice Kirby said that "there often is a very good reason... because people suffer great risks if their name goes on the Internet that that will become known to the country that they want to avoid," to which Al-Kateb's lawyer replied, "That is correct, but, of course, with Mr Al-Kateb there is no country."

The respondents argued that the provisions required that unlawful non-citizens be detained until their removal, and that the purpose of removal, on which the detention was founded, did not cease to exist just because it was not practicable in the foreseeable future to carry out that purpose. They made what was referred to as "the 'never say never' proposition", that although securing a person's removal or deportation from Australia may be difficult, and "often it takes years of diplomatic negotiation before a country is prepared to accept someone... it is very hard to imagine a case where the purpose of removal or deportation is one that can never occur." Although the respondents did not challenge the finding of fact in the Federal Court that there was no real possibility of Al-Kateb's removal in the foreseeable future, they argued that the test applied to reach that decision "fails to take into account... the difficulties and the fact that things can change."

=== Non-judicial detention ===
The issue of whether the Act was constitutionally valid revolved around the fact that immigration detention is a form of administrative detention, or detention imposed by the executive branch of government. Detention generally is considered to be a judicial function, which can be exercised only by courts, pursuant to Chapter III of the Australian Constitution. However, there are certain exceptions which allow non-judicial detention, such as detention in order to effect an arrest, or detention for quarantine purposes. Courts in Australia have also held that, generally, detention of non-citizens for immigration purposes is also valid.

In this situation, the court had decided in previous cases that immigration detention, for the purposes of processing and removal, did not infringe on Chapter III. Al-Kateb argued that if indeed the provisions of the Migration Act extended as far as to allow the indefinite detention of people like him, then it would have gone beyond those valid purposes and would infringe Chapter III. That is, non-judicial detention is permitted for the purposes of facilitating the removal of unlawful non-citizens, and if the prospects of removal are remote or impracticable for the reasonably foreseeable future, then the detention can no longer be considered to be for the purpose of removal. Al-Kateb's argument in this respect relied on a decision of the Federal Court in another case, Minister for Immigration and Multicultural and Indigenous Affairs v Al Masri, in which a Full Court of the Federal Court found that a person in a very similar situation to Al-Kateb was entitled to be released.

The respondents focused on the case in which this system of exceptions was first articulated, Chu Kheng Lim v Minister for Immigration, Local Government and Ethnic Affairs. The concept of detention as an exclusively judicial function was clearly articulated by only three judges out of seven, Brennan, Deane and Dawson, and although in later cases that central concept was generally agreed with, their list of exceptions was not. The respondents focused on Justice Gaudron's decision in Lim, in which she said:

Detention in custody in circumstances not involving some breach of the criminal law and not coming within well-accepted categories of the kind to which Brennan, Deane and Dawson JJ refer is offensive to ordinary notions of what is involved in a just society. But I am not presently persuaded that legislation authorizing detention in circumstances involving no breach of the criminal law and travelling beyond presently accepted categories is necessarily and inevitably offensive to Ch.III.

The respondents also noted that Gaudron made similar comments in the Stolen Generations case, which also considered non-judicial detention in the context of Aboriginal children who were forcibly removed from their parents' care. For this reason and others, they argued that the power to detain people for the purposes of criminal trial and punishment (as opposed to detention generally) was clearly a judicial function, but there is no general rule and other powers to detain may not offend Chapter III.

== Judgment ==
The ultimate decision, reached by a majority of four judges to three, was that the Migration Act did permit indefinite detention. Each judge delivered a separate judgment with Justices McHugh, Hayne, Callinan and Heydon forming the majority. Chief Justice Gleeson and Justices Gummow and Kirby dissented, finding instead that the Migration Act should not be interpreted to permit indefinite detention.

=== Indefinite detention ===
Justice Hayne delivered the leading judgment for the majority. On the question of whether the Migration Act allowed people in Al-Kateb's situation to be detained indefinitely, he said:

...the most that could ever be said in a particular case where it is not now, and has not been, reasonably practicable to effect removal, is that there is now no country which will receive a particular non-citizen whom Australia seeks to remove, and it cannot now be predicted when that will happen.

He said that because the removal or deportation of people always involves some degree of uncertainty, then the interpretation of the relevant provisions in the Migration Act could not proceed on the assumption that removal is always possible. He concluded that:

...even if, as in this case, it is found that 'there is no real likelihood or prospect of [the non-citizen's] removal in the reasonably foreseeable future', that does not mean that continued detention is not for the purpose of subsequent removal.

Justice McHugh stated simply that the language of the sections was not ambiguous, and clearly required the indefinite detention of Al-Kateb. He said that the requirement that people be removed "as soon as reasonably practicable" was directed at limiting the duration of detention to as little as necessary, but it did "not mean that the detention... is limited to a maximum period expiring when it is impracticable to remove or deport the person."

Chief Justice Gleeson, in dissent, said that in interpreting legislation, the courts "do not impute to the legislature an intention to abrogate or curtail certain human rights or freedoms (of which personal liberty is the most basic) unless such an intention is clearly manifested by unambiguous language". He concluded that the provisions requiring that unlawful non-citizens be detained were ambiguous in that in a situation such as Al-Kateb's, where it became impossible to fulfil the purpose for which he was detained, the law was not clear as to whether the result is that the detention should be suspended until the purpose becomes possible again, or that the detention should continue indefinitely. The Act did not deal with a situation like Al-Kateb's. Gleeson said:

In making that choice I am influenced by the general principle of interpretation stated above. I am also influenced by the consideration that the detention in question is mandatory, not discretionary. In a case of uncertainty, I would find it easier to discern a legislative intention to confer a power of indefinite administrative detention if the power were coupled with a discretion...

Accordingly, he found that a proper construction of the provisions of the Act would not permit Al-Kateb's detention to continue indefinitely.

Justice Callinan, also discussed the purpose of detention, in obiter dicta. He said that detention of non-citizens for the purposes of deportation may not be the only form of detention that would be within the federal parliament's aliens power, rather "it may be the case that detention for the purpose of preventing aliens from entering the general community, working, or otherwise enjoying the benefits that Australian citizens enjoy is constitutionally acceptable."

=== Non-judicial detention ===
The second issue was whether indefinite detention for migration purposes infringed on Chapter III of the Australian Constitution. While every judge discussed this issue, only three judges, Justices McHugh, Hayne and Heydon, found it necessary to make a final decision on the issue. They all reached the same conclusion, that the detention scheme was constitutional.

Justice Hayne concluded that the detention scheme in the Migration Act did not contravene Chapter III because, fundamentally, it was not punitive. The Act did not make being in Australia without a visa an offence (although it had been in the past), and in reality he considered the mandatory detention scheme to be not that different from a system in which all people were prevented from entering Australia without permission at all.

Justice McHugh also emphasised that immigration detention was not punitive, saying:

A law requiring the detention of the alien takes its character from the purpose of the detention. As long as the purpose of the detention is to make the alien available for deportation or to prevent the alien from entering Australia or the Australian community, the detention is non-punitive.

McHugh suggested that detention for a non-punitive purpose could still offend Chapter III if it prevented a court "from determining some matter that is a condition precedent to authorising detention." However, that was not the case here.

In dissent, Justice Gummow recognised that "the focusing of attention on whether detention is 'penal or punitive in character' is apt to mislead", and emphasised the purpose of detention as the fundamental criterion by which non-judicial detention was allowed in previous cases. He said that "it cannot be for the executive government to determine the placing from time to time of that boundary line which marks off a category of deprivation of liberty from the reach of Ch III."

=== Constitutional interpretation ===
In addition to the substantive issues in the case, there was also more general historical and theoretical issues involved. During Justice McHugh's final years on the court, he and Justice Kirby expressed differing views on constitutional interpretation, and particularly on the role of international law and principles of human rights in that process. In this case, the two judges continued that debate.

Justice McHugh drew analogies between the legislation at issue in the case, and previous legislation which had authorised indefinite administrative detention, such as the arrangements under the War Precautions Act 1914. Regulations made under that and other acts allowed the internment of several thousand people, including German Australians during World War I and Japanese Australians during World War II. McHugh noted that those arrangements had been challenged, and upheld, in the High Court (for example in the 1915 case of Lloyd v Wallach), and emphasised that at no time had anyone questioned that detention for protective purposes, as opposed to punitive purposes, would conflict with Chapter III. He concluded that although the situation at hand was "tragic", the courts were not at liberty to question the propriety of decisions made by the Parliament of Australia on moral or human rights grounds, given the absence of a bill of rights in Australia.

Justice Kirby retorted that "'Tragic' outcomes are best repaired before they become a settled rule of the Constitution." He also drew a historical analogy, referring to the 1951 Communist Party case where the High Court rejected attempts by the Menzies government to outlaw the Australian Communist Party. After noting McHugh's recent praise of the decision in a speech, Kirby said:

We should be no less vigilant than our predecessors were. As they did in the Communist Party Case, we also should reject Executive assertions of self-defining and self-fulfilling powers. We should deny such interpretations to federal law, including the Act... This Court should be no less defensive of personal liberty in Australia than the courts of the United States, the United Kingdom and the Privy Council for Hong Kong have been, all of which have withheld from the Executive a power of unlimited detention.

Referring to the cases in which the High Court had upheld the wartime legislation allowing indefinite administrative detention, Kirby said that equivalent decisions in other countries had come to be regarded as embarrassing and incorrect, and should be likewise regarded in Australia. While conceding that the scope of the Parliament's powers with respect to defence will be greater in wartime than in peacetime, Kirby said that they could not extend so far as to displace fundamental constitutional requirements such as those in Chapter III.

Finally, Kirby also suggested that there was much scope for expanding the reach of the limitations on legislative and executive power imposed by Chapter III, and drawing on another paper by McHugh, argued that this ought to extend to the protection of due process rights as implicit constitutional rights, in the absence of an explicit bill of rights.

== Consequences ==
This cartoon by Ron Tandberg, published the day after the case was decided, is representative of the shock with which many commentators greeted the decision, and illustrates the way in which the court itself was criticised as much as the decision was.

As a result of the decision, Al-Kateb had to return to immigration detention. Claire O'Connor, Al-Kateb's lawyer, said, "The effect of this decision is that [Al-Kateb] will be locked up until a state of Palestine is created or some other Middle Eastern state is willing to have him. It's taken 51 years so far. I'm not holding my breath."

The decision sparked much controversy about the scope of the mandatory detention laws. Along with the two other immigration detention decisions handed down on that day, the case prompted several political leaders, including the Federal President of the Australian Labor Party, Carmen Lawrence, and Australian Democrats leader, Senator Andrew Bartlett, to call for an Australian bill of rights. The executive director of the Sydney Institute, Gerard Henderson, said that the case demonstrated "the need for empathy in public policy".

However, the case also aroused controversy about the court itself. David Marr described the 4–3 decision as indicating a new division in the composition of the court, the "liberty divide", and noted that the result on the liberty question moved the court in the opposite direction to the contemporary trends of the Supreme Court of the United States and the House of Lords. Arthur Glass observed that the minority judges began their judgments from the position that indefinite non-judicial detention and the curtailment of personal freedom were troubling consequences, and he noted that "as is not uncommon in statutory construction, where you start from is critical to where you end up". Marr accused the majority of deciding that "saving Australia from boat people counts for more than Al-Kateb's raw liberty".

The controversy resulted in pressure on the new Immigration Minister Amanda Vanstone, who agreed to review the cases of twenty-four stateless people in immigration detention and ultimately granted bridging visas to nine people including Al-Kateb, allowing them to be released into the community. However, the conditions of the bridging visas did not permit holders to work, study, obtain social security benefits or receive healthcare from Medicare, and Al-Kateb remained entirely dependent on donations from friends and supporters to survive. Al-Kateb said of his situation, "We [are] just walking in a big detention. And we are all the time worried that they will send us back to detention again... It's like a death punishment." He was granted a permanent visa in October 2007 by immigration minister Kevin Andrews.

In a 2005 speech to the Law Society of the University of Sydney, Justice McHugh reiterated his view of the case as a tragic situation and said that it was necessary for "the informed and impassioned" to seek reforms to legislation to protect individual rights since the absence of a bill of rights limited the ability of the courts to protect rights. McHugh said that cases in countries such as the United Kingdom, in which courts had found that indefinite administrative detention was not lawful, were based on bills of rights or other instruments, such as the European Convention on Human Rights, and lamented that without such instruments, Australian courts are "not empowered to be as active as the Supreme Court of the United States or the House of Lords in the defence of the fundamental principles of human rights".

In response to McHugh's speech, Chief Justice Gleeson said that the issue of whether or not Australia should have a bill of rights was a purely political one and not a matter for the courts. Gleeson said that while he had personal political views on the matter, "It doesn't serve the community for a serving Chief Justice to enter that arena."

=== Academic response ===
In academic circles, the case is generally seen as an example of the court taking two different approaches to statutory interpretation, with the legalistic approach of the majority judges contrasting with the purposive approach of the minority judges.

Christopher Richter suggested that the majority's legalistic approach, while yielding a workable construction of the provisions of the Migration Act, resulted in a dangerous situation in this case because the Act did not specifically address the situation of stateless persons, and the literal approach did not allow for gaps in the legislation to be filled.

Matthew Zagor suggested that there are various assumptions about the constitutional relationship between the branches of government implicit in those two different approaches. He argues that the majority, particularly Justice Callinan, preferred the plain meaning of the Migration Act because for them, "the key principle at play is simple: the Court should not frustrate Parliament's purpose or obstruct the executive". Zagor also comments on the irony that the supposedly-legalistic conclusion reached by the majority is at odds with a prior High Court decision, led by Australia's most prominent legalist, Chief Justice Owen Dixon, who implied a temporal limit onto World War II-era legislation, which also included a scheme of executive detention.

Some commentators, such as Juliet Curtin, have noted that both the majority and minority judgments, except for that of Justice Kirby, focused almost exclusively on Australian law and did not consider either international law or decisions from other common law countries. Curtin argues that the attitude to international jurisprudence, which included decisions of the Supreme Court of the United States and of the House of Lords, demonstrates an "insular disregard for the principles of international law" on the court's part.

Several commentators have expressed the view that the decision has produced confusion and uncertainty with respect to constitutional restrictions on executive power in this area. Matthew Zagor noted that while the three minority Justices in this case and Justice Callinan in another case have expressed their support for the existing test in Chu Kheng Lim (that non-punitive detention is constitutionally permissible if it is "reasonably capable of being seen as necessary"), the test was not in fact used by the majority in this case to conclude that the detention here was permissible. He also pointed out that in later cases, only Justice Kirby seemed to uphold the 'vibe' of the Chu Kheng Lim test, with Chief Justice Gleeson and Justice Gummow attempting to separate the character of detention from its consequences (suggesting that detention that is punitive in effect may not necessarily also be punitive in character). Finally, Zagor argues that of the Justices who questioned the Chu Kheng Lim test, none were able to provide a coherent alternative to substitute for it.

== NZYQ v Minister for Immigration ==
The 2023 decision in NZYQ v Minister for Immigration overruled this decision, holding that indefinite detention of non-citizens where there is no prospect of release in the foreseeable future is considered punitive detention, and is therefore a breach of the separation of powers. This is because the executive branch would be exercising punitive powers, which can only be performed by the judicial branch, and is therefore constitutionally invalid.

== See also ==
- Peter Qasim
- Merhan Karimi Nasseri
