= Mohamed El Ghanem =

Egyptian refugee, attorney

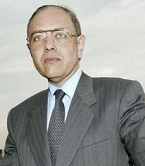
- Born: Cairo, Egypt
- Occupations: Lawyer & Swiss refugee
- Known for: Detained seven years without charge by the Geneva Judiciary, for alleged retaliation for refusing to spy on the local Muslim community.

Dr. Mohamed El Ghanem is an Egyptian refugee detained without charge for seven years by the Geneva judiciary, between 2007 through 2013, allegedly in retaliation for refusing to spy on Geneva's Muslim community leaders.

Dr. El Ghanem was released shortly after the Swiss Supreme Court ruled his detention wrongful, requiring he be released in October 2013.

Dr. El Ghanem was released from prison and put into a mental hospital by the STate of Geneva (2022), based on allegations made without his presence. Suffering the effects of his wrongful confinement, he fired his own lawyers.

As of 2024, a former Swiss politician validated his disappearance while in the hands of the Swiss authorities.

== Biography ==
Dr. El Ghanem is a Professor of International law, having received his PhD from the University of Rome. Dr. El Ghanem authored a 1991 book on "Terrorism and the Law". As an Egyptian government official, he drafted much of the country's anti-terrorism legislation.

Prior to seeking asylum in Switzerland, El Ghanem was an Egyptian Government official, a Director in the Ministry of Interior, who also taught law at the police academy in Cairo. In the late 1990s, El Ghanem had differences with Egyptian government, because he refused to fabricate false charges against journalists and other dissidents. He subsequently became the target of persecution himself for contesting the persecution of others, at which point he sought asylum first in Italy, then in Switzerland.

== Human rights defender ==
Before he left Egypt, Dr. El Ghanem was well known for defending the rights of Egyptian Christians (Copts) who were at the time suffering under the church-building ban of President Hosni Mubarek. According to journalist Robert Fisk, Dr. El Ghanem's defense of Christian Copts made him a "thorn in the side of the Mubarek regime".

== Mohamed El Ghanem's detention without charge in Switzerland ==
In 2000, Dr. El Ghanem fled Egypt in the plane of Swiss Foreign Minister Joseph Deiss.

In 2001, Dr. El Ghanem received refugee status from the Swiss government.

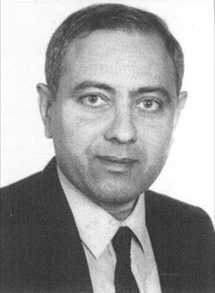
Dr. El Ghanem came to Switzerland seeking asylum and refuge, and according to journalist Robert Fisk, "found himself in an equally dangerous game"

In 2002, Dr. El Ghanem claims Swiss secret services began aggressively recruiting him as an informant to spy on prominent local Muslim community figures, notably Geneva imam Hani Ramadan. At the time, a large-scale operation of spying on the Geneva-based imam called "Operation Memphis" was in-play. To the chagrin of the Swiss security services, Dr. El Ghanem refused to collaborate as an informant. As a result of his refusal, he claimed to have received severe harassment and threats by the same Swiss secret service officials. In response, Dr. El Ghanem filed charges against the Geneva police for the harassment. Dr. El Ghanem then claims he was menaced to remove the harassment charges he had filed.

The harassment continued repeatedly and without pause. Dr. El Ghanem alleged that informants were being used in the harassment, most of them migrants.

In 2003, Dr. El Ghanem called journalist Robert Fisk in Beirut and told him of the threats and harassment he'd received from the Swiss secret services. Robert Fisk knew Dr. El Ghanem from Egypt; had previously written articles about his Egyptian government persecution.

In 2005, Dr. El Ghanem was seated in the restaurant-cafeteria of the University of Geneva, where he was studying to gain equivalence of his law degree from the University of Rome. Dr. El Ghanem was allegedly attacked by a Somali migrant; Dr. El Ghanem claimed he waved a butter knife at the migrant to ward him away. Police suddenly appeared and rather than defending Dr. El Ghanem, Geneva Police arrested him, claiming he had attacked the migrant with the knife. Subsequent to this, Dr. El Ghanem was arrested and held without charge, for several weeks. Written reports of the Geneva Police claim that Dr. El Ghanem had attacked and "placed a knife in the abdomen" of the migrant. Years later, the Geneva Police officer in charge of the case would admit fault with his own official Police report.

In 2005, subsequent to these events, Dr. El Ghanem wrote several senior Swiss officials saying that the case would have "consequences". Dr. El Ghanem was detained on the basis of these letters, but also on official allegations that he had published angry comments online, which wound-up on jihadic websites, inciting violence against Switzerland. Dr. El Ghanem's involvement in any such publication has never been formally proven nor publicly substantiated. The family of Dr. El Ghanem disputes these claims, stating he had no ties to extremist groups, that he sought only protection, and that Dr. El Ghanem was peacefully studying at the University of Geneva to obtain Swiss recognition of his law degree from the University of Rome when the Swiss harassment started.

Dr. El Ghanem's allegations of official harassment were never examined by Geneva Judiciary. Instead, the court judged Dr. El Ghanem criminally irresponsible (mentally unfit and criminally dangerous) vis-a-vis the interaction with the Somali migrant, charges which were later determined to be false. This court decision taken by the Geneva Judiciary was not only based on ill-founded charges, but it was run in absentia, using a medical assessment of a doctor who had never seen Dr. El Ghanem in person, i.e. the medical doctor had only read the allegations of the Geneva judicial police, many of which were later refuted by the police themselves.

In 2006, the Swiss Federal Council cancelled Dr. El Ghanem's refugee status and expelled him from Switzerland, on the grounds that Dr. El Ghanem was a threat to the external and internal security of the country. The removal of Dr. El Ghanem's refugee status and his expulsion from Switzerland were performed administratively: without a hearing, and without the right to appeal.

As a result, Dr. El Ghanem, who had been learning French and studying law to pass the Swiss bar exam, was removed from his housing, and found his state support as a refugee arbitrarily curtailed; he was left without housing or means of sustenance.

=== 2007: Egyptian refugee jailed in Geneva for refusing to spy for the Swiss ===
In 2007, Dr. El Ghanem was jailed without charge in Champ-Dollon prison outside Geneva. Due to this arrangement, Dr. El Ghanem has remained in prison without charge since 2007. His family has repeatedly requested to see him, and has been repeatedly refused.

For two years the Swiss government refused to reply to Dr. El Ghanem's family's questions about his whereabouts.

In 2009, journalist Robert Fisk declared that Mohamed El Ghanem had been "disappeared" by the Swiss Government.

=== Possible FBI involvement in case ===
In 2007, the FBI called the family of Dr. El Ghanem, who live in the United States, before they departed for Geneva to try to visit him. This was considered to indicate FBI surveillance of his U.S.-based relatives. Collaboration of U.S. authorities in this affair has long been suspected.

The FBI is "embedded" in the Swiss Federal Department of Justice and Police, under the auspices of a 2006 bilateral treaty for joint U.S.-Swiss investigations. Under a U.S.-Swiss treaty, Swiss-based FBI activities in joint investigations are financed by the United States, meaning they may have funded the investigation and imprisonment of El Ghanem.

FBI tactics of forced recruitment for spying on Muslim leaders are well known, having been reported on extensively by the ACLU and U.S. news outlets such as CNN. U.S. Muslims who have rejected FBI recruitment have been subjected to severe harassment, threats, arbitrary arrest. The U.S. organization Council on American–Islamic Relations (CAIR) has complained repeatedly about FBI threats, coercion and deportation of U.S.-based Muslims who have refused to spy for the FBI.

=== 2010: Lawyers raise case before the UN Committee on Enforced and Voluntary Disappearances ===
In 2009, Dr. El Ghanem submitted a pro se application for habeas corpus. This was ignored by the Geneva Court.

In 2010, lawyers for Dr. El Ghanem raised the case before the Office of the United Nations High Commissioner for Human Rights and the Committee for "Enforced and Voluntary Disappearances". The Swiss response to the UN was to state that Dr. El Ghanem was incarcerated due to his "dangerousness".

Dr. El Ghanem had undertaken several hunger strikes during his imprisonment; he was already suffering from heart problems. By 2011, Dr. El Ghanem had suffered severe medical problems in prison. His lawyer stated in 2012 that El Ghanem had "almost died" due to his imprisonment.

=== 2012: Swiss Activists and Egyptian Government ask Swiss Government for answers ===
By 2012, the local press were accusing the Geneva judiciary of attempting to bury their mistakes by keeping Dr. El Ghanem in prison, and noting that El Ghanem's incarceration was damaging the image of Switzerland abroad

Swiss activists were also angrily protesting for his release, holding sit-ins in front of the Office of the United Nations High Commissioner for Human Rights in Geneva.

Also in 2012, the new Egyptian Government was asking the Swiss government to explain their treatment of a man who had sought refuge from the Mubarak regime. This was in response to a number of riots which were held in Cairo, protesting the wrongful incarceration of Dr. El Ghanem. In response to these official Egyptian queries, and the activity of local Swiss activists, the Swiss Parliament discussed the topic.

=== 2013: Swiss Supreme Court orders the release of Dr. El Ghanem ===
By mid-2012, lawyers for Dr. El Ghanem raised a case before the Swiss Supreme Court requesting that a new analysis of the case be held.

In January 2013, the Federal Supreme Court ruled in favour of the release of Dr. El Ghanem.

In June 2013, the Geneva Judiciary appealed the ruling on Dr. El Ghanem's release. They were unsuccessful. In October 2013, El Ghanem was released from prison.

=== 2013: Involuntary commitment to a psychiatric hospital ===
From 2013 onwards, he was subsequently committed under an involuntary hospitalization regime at the Belle-Idée Psychiatric Hospital (https://www.letemps.ch/suisse/mohamed-elghanam-quitte-champdollon) without it being specified whether he was subjected to involuntary treatment.

=== 2024: Apparently "disappeared" ===
According to Geneva politician Chloé Frammery, who campaigned for his release, he was interned from 2013 until at least 2023. In October 2024, she contacted the Belle-Idée Psychiatric Hospital, which confirmed that the colonel was not there, or no longer was.

== Articles about the case ==
- THE INDEPENDENT: Robert Fisk’s World: The curious case of the missing Egyptian and the Swiss police, The Independent, 29 August 2009
- THE INDEPENDENT: Robert Fisk’s World: Jailed in Geneva: The Colonel Who Stood up to Mubarek but Refused to Spy for the Swiss, Robert Fisk, The Independent, March 5, 2012
- LEMAN BLUE (Swiss Television) Discussion of El Ghanem Case
- Interview with Brother of Dr. El Ghanem (Part in English, part in French)

== See also ==
- Forced disappearance
- Indefinite detention
- Switzerland
- Geneva
- Coercion
