= Indefinite detention =

Incarceration without a trial

Indefinite detention is the incarceration of an arrested person by a national government or law enforcement agency for an indefinite amount of time without a trial. The Human Rights Watch considers this practice as violating national and international laws, particularly human rights laws, although it was adopted into law in various liberal democracies.

In recent years, governments have indefinitely incarcerated individuals suspected of terrorism, often in black sites, sometimes declaring them enemy combatants – a notable example being the Guantanamo Bay detention camp. Formalized forms of indefinite detention also exist in some countries around the world in the form of government-mandated administrative detention.

== Views by country ==
While laws that allow indefinite detention are present in many countries, including liberal democracies, human rights groups hold unfavorable views towards the practice.

=== Australia ===
In Australia, indefinite detention is unlawful and violates the Constitution.

In 1992, in the case of Chu Kheng Lim v Minister for Immigration, the High Court of Australia ruled that detention by the government can only be used to punish crimes. However, it found exceptions for non-citizens and possibly during non-peacetime.

In 1994, indefinite detention was introduced for Vietnamese, Chinese, and Cambodian refugees; previous laws had imposed a 273-day limit. The constitutional validity of this was challenged in the 2004 case of Al-Kateb v Godwin. It found that the indefinite detention of a stateless person is lawful. In 2023, this position was overruled in the case of NZYQ v Minister for Immigration. Instead, the High Court of Australia held that the indefinite detention of stateless persons is unlawful. Detention prior to deportation is only permitted when there are real prospects of successful deportation.

=== China ===
Human rights groups claim a history of forced labour, arbitrary arrest, and detention of minority groups, including Falun Gong members, Tibetans, Muslim minorities, political prisoners and other groups in the People's Republic of China. Notably, since at least 2017, more than one million Uyghurs and other minorities have been overwhelmingly detained without trial for the purposes of a "people's war on terror". In the case of the Falun Gong in particular, there have been claims of extraordinary abuses of human rights in concentration camps, including organ harvesting and systematic torture.

=== Israel ===
It was reported in July 2016 by Haaretz that 651 Palestinians were in Israeli jails without having been given due process, and that the number of Palestinians being detained in Israel without trial was on the rise. In October 2021, it was reported that Israel's Police Commissioner, Kobi Shabtai, was personally pushing for the use of detentions without trial, or "administrative detentions," by the Shin Bet security service to police Israel’s Arab communities.

The Israeli human rights organization B'Tselem reported that as of December 2024, Israeli authorities held 3,327 Palestinians in administrative detention, 1,881 Palestinians as illegal combatants, and 2,323 Palestinians under detention until the conclusion of legal proceedings.

=== Malaysia ===
The Internal Security Act, enacted in 1960, allowed indefinite detention without trial for two years, with further extensions as needed. It was repealed in 2012 amid public pressure for political reform. The Prevention of Terrorism Act (POTA) was introduced in March 2015 after a series of terrorist acts were committed in Malaysia. POTA allows authorities to detain terrorism suspects without trial but stipulates that no person is to be arrested for their political beliefs or activities.

=== Singapore ===
In Singapore, the Internal Security Act allows the government to arrest and indefinitely detain individuals who pose a threat to national security. It is often used in the context of terrorism, particularly when concerning individuals who are about to engage in Islamic terrorism or hold Islamic extremist views. Opposition politician Chia Thye Poh was held under the Internal Security Act for 23 years from 1966 to 1989, followed by 9 more years of house arrest until 1997, for a total of 32 years without trial or charge.

=== Switzerland ===
In Switzerland, local laws related to what the government claims is "dangerousness" can be invoked to incarcerate persons without charge. This was controversially effected in the case of Egyptian refugee Mohamed El Ghanem, who was detained without trial for years for refusing to spy on Muslim community leaders in Geneva.

=== Thailand ===
Arnon Nampa was detained without trial in 2020 for 6 days, but after Prime Minister Prayuth Chan-o-cha declared to use all laws, including lèse majesté, against the protesters in November 2020. He had been detained for 110 days in the first round of remanding. Since 2023, Arnon Nampa has been serving a four year prison sentence.

=== United Kingdom ===
In 2004, the House of Lords ruled that indefinite detention of foreign terrorism suspects under Section 23 of the Anti-terrorism, Crime and Security Act 2001 violated the Human Rights Act and the European Convention on Human Rights. Under Schedule 8 of the Terrorism Act 2000, the detention of a terrorism suspect may be prolonged upon application of a warrant for further detention by a Crown prosecutor (in England and Wales), the Director of Public Prosecutions (in Northern Ireland), the Lord Advocate or procurator fiscal (in Scotland), or a police superintendent (in any part of the United Kingdom). The Police, Crime, Sentencing and Courts Act 2022 also allows for indefinite detention as a maximum penalty.

=== United States ===
In the United States, indefinite detention has been used to hold terror suspects during the war on terror. According to the American Civil Liberties Union (ACLU), Section 412 of the Patriot Act permits indefinite detention of immigrants, one of the most highly publicized cases has been that of Jose Padilla, whose ultimate prosecution and conviction in the United States have been highly controversial. The indefinite detention of prisoners at Guantanamo Bay has been called a violation of international law by the United Nations, the International Committee of the Red Cross, and Human Rights Watch.

On November 29, 2011, the United States Senate rejected a proposed amendment to the National Defense Authorization Act for Fiscal Year 2012 ("NDAA") that would have banned indefinite detention by the United States government of its own citizens, leading to criticism that the right of habeas corpus had been undermined. The House of Representatives and Senate approved the National Defense Authorization Act in December 2011, and President Barack Obama signed it December 31, 2011. The new indefinite detention provision of the law was decried as a "historic assault on American liberty." The ACLU stated that "President Obama's action today is a blight on his legacy because he will forever be known as the president who signed indefinite detention without charge or trial into law."

On May 16, 2012, in response to a lawsuit filed by journalist Chris Hedges, Noam Chomsky, Naomi Wolf and others, United States District Judge Katherine B. Forrest ruled that the indefinite detention section of the law (1021) likely violates the First and Fifth Amendments of the U.S. Constitution and issued a preliminary injunction preventing the U.S. government from enforcing it. In September 2012, the Obama administration called on the federal appeals court to reverse the "dangerous" ruling of the lower court, supporting the plaintiffs in the lawsuit and arguing that the rule was so vague that it could be used against US citizens and journalists. On July 17, 2013, the U.S. Court of Appeals for the Second Circuit struck down the injunction against indefinite detention of U.S. citizens by the president under the National Defense Authorization Act of 2012. The appellate court ruled that "plaintiffs lack standing to seek pre-enforcement review of Section 1021 and vacate the permanent injunction ruling that the American citizen plaintiffs lack standing because Section 1021 says nothing at all about the President's authority to detain American citizens. The Supreme Court declined to hear an appeal of the case.

In 2013, the House of Representatives and the Senate reauthorized the National Defense Authorization Act after amendments to effectively ban indefinite detention of U.S. citizens were defeated in both chambers. On December 26, 2013, President Obama signed into law the National Defense Authorization Act of 2014.

== See also ==
- Administrative detention
- At His Majesty's pleasure, a legal term of art in Commonwealth countries which includes the indeterminate sentences of some convicted prisoners
- Detention (imprisonment)
- Habeas corpus
- Indefinite imprisonment
- Incapacitation (penology)
- Lawfare
- Orwellian
