= Ads Up Refugee Network =

US Refugee support organization

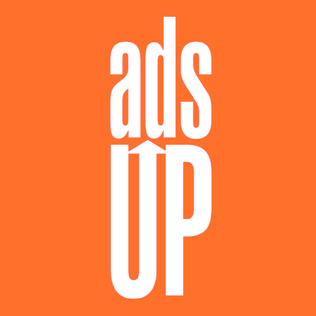
- Nickname: Ads-Up
- Formation: 2018
- Purpose: Refugee support
- Headquarters: Washington, D.C.
- Founders: Ben Winsor; Fleur Wood
- Website: www.ads-up.org

Australian Diaspora Steps Up, known as Ads Up or Ads Up Refugee Network is a Washington, D.C. non-governmental organization that helps refugees held in indefinite detention in Australia.

== Organization ==
Ads Up USA was co-founded in 2018 in Washington, D.C., by Fleur Wood and Ben Winsor, both Australian expats in the US. It has since grown to 1,700 members, mostly based in Australia, but also including 100 volunteers in America who help with refugee settlement.

== Activities ==
The US organization is run by Australian diaspora who help refugees held in Australian's off shore detention centers in Nauru and Manus Island in Papua New Guinea.

Upon arrival in US refugees are provided with financial support.
