= Graham v Minister for Immigration and Border Protection =

High Court of Australia case regarding the court's access to a Minister's decisions

Palmer v Western Australia
- Court: High Court of Australia
- Full case name: Graham v Minister for Immigration and Border Protection; Te Puia v Minister for Immigration and Border Protection
- Decided: 6 September 2017
- Citation: [2017] HCA 33
- Transcripts: 27 Nov 2016 [2016] HCATrans 256; 14 Nov [2016] HCATrans 270; 30 Mar 2017 [2017] HCATrans 63

Court membership
- Judges sitting: Kiefel CJ, Bell, Gageler, Keane, Nettle, Gordon, Edelman JJ

Case opinions
- s 503A of the Migration Act 1958 is invalid to the extent that s 503A(2)(c) would apply to prevent the Minister for Immigration and Border Protection from being required to divulge or communicate certain information to the High Court or Federal Court

Graham v Minister for Immigration and Border Protection was a case heard by the High Court of Australia at the same time as Te Puia v Minister for Immigration and Border Protection, which held that section 503A of the Migration Act 1958 is invalid to the extent that s 503A(2)(c) would apply to prevent the Minister for Immigration and Border Protection from being required to divulge or communicate certain information to the High Court or Federal Court.

== Background ==
The plaintiff in Graham was Aaron Graham; the applicant in Te Puia was Mehaka Te Puia. Both are citizens of New Zealand and had Class TY Subclass 444 Special Category (Temporary) visas. Both received letters—Graham on 9 June 2016 and Te Puia on 2 November 2015—that the Minister for Immigration and Border Protection had decided to cancel their visas. The reasons given by the Minister for the cancellation of the visas were, for Graham's visa, that "he was satisfied as to the conditions for cancellation provided in s 501(3) of the Migration Act 1958 and that he should not exercise his discretion in favour of the plaintiff to not cancel his visa," and in the case of Te Puia, undisclosed reasons citing section 503A of the Migration Act that rendered such reasons protected from disclosure.

Section 503A(2) of the Migration Act states that:

(2) If:

(a) information is communicated to an authorised migration officer by a gazetted agency on condition that it be treated as confidential information and the information is relevant to the exercise of a power under section 501, 501A, 501B, 501BA, 501C or 501CA; or

(b) information is communicated to the Minister or an authorised migration officer in accordance with paragraph (1)(a) or (b);

then:

(c) the Minister or officer must not be required to divulge or communicate the information to a court, a tribunal, a parliament or parliamentary committee or any other body or person; and

(d) if the information was communicated to an authorised migration officer--the officer must not give the information in evidence before a court, a tribunal, a parliament or parliamentary committee or any other body or person.

== Decision ==
The High Court handed down its decision on 6 September 2017, with its reasons published the same day. The Court, by a majority, held that:

Parliament cannot enact a law which denies to the High Court when exercising jurisdiction under s 75(v) of the Constitution (or to another court when exercising jurisdiction conferred under s 77(i) or (iii) by reference to s 75(v)) the ability to enforce the legislated limits of an officer's power.
