= Peter Qasim =

Indian-born immigration detainee

- Born: 14 May 1974 (age 52); Gopalla, Rajouri district, Jammu and Kashmir, India
- Known for: longest-serving detainee within the Australian immigration detention system

Peter Qasim (Urdu: پیٹر قاسم) was the longest-serving detainee in Australian immigration detention, having been detained for over seven years. He had not been deported because he was stateless. He was held at Baxter Immigration Reception and Processing Centre before being transferred to an Adelaide psychiatric facility.

He had applied to over 80 countries for asylum, but had not been accepted. This includes India, which claims sovereignty over Kashmir, from where Qasim originates.

== Detention in Australia ==
In personal accounts Qasim described escaping from his home village of Gopalla in India, into Pakistan, then through Singapore and Papua New Guinea onto Australia. Qasim's provenance, however, proved difficult to verify due to a lack of supporting documentation or witnesses. This lack of evidence, and numerous unsuccessful attempts to validate Qasim's story were primarily responsible for his prolonged period of detention.

His case has been publicised by the well-known Australian entrepreneur Dick Smith. Australian authorities have maintained that he has not proven his nationality. He was invited to apply for a new visa on 20 June 2005. In 2005, Qasim was 31 years old, and was held at Baxter Detention Centre until, on 9 June 2005, he was moved to a psychiatric hospital. He received treatment for depression.

=== Release ===
On 16 July 2005 Qasim was granted a bridging visa by the Australian Government. The visa granted permission to work and to receive welfare benefits. He spent a total of six years and 10 months in detention.

He was still holding a bridging visa as of September 2013.

== See also ==
- Cornelia Rau
