= NZYQ v Minister for Immigration =

2023 decision of the High Court of Australia

- Court: High Court of Australia
- Full case name: NZYQ v Minister for Immigration, Citizenship and Multicultural Affairs
- Decided: 28 November 2023
- Citations: [2023] HCA 37, (2023) 280 CLR 137

Court membership
- Judges sitting: Gageler CJ, Gordon, Edelman, Steward, Gleeson, Jagot, Beech-Jones JJ

Case opinions
- Detention of non-citizens is not for a non-punitive purpose if there is no real prospect of removal from Australia in the reasonably foreseeable future.

Laws applied
- Migration Act 1958
- This case overturned a previous ruling
- Al-Kateb v Godwin

NZYQ v Minister for Immigration is a 2023 decision of the High Court of Australia. It is a landmark case in Australian constitutional law, concerning the separation of powers under the Australian Constitution. It was the first judgment of the Gageler court.

The decision is notable for having overturned Al-Kateb v Godwin, in which the Gleeson court held the Migration Act could be applied to authorise the indefinite detention of stateless persons.

The court ruled that when properly interpreted, the Migration Act was beyond the legislative power of the Commonwealth insofar as it applied to the plaintiff. This was because under Australia's constitutional system, penal or punitive detention may only occur where criminal guilt is being punished by the judiciary (known as the Chu Kheng Lim principle). The plaintiff's detention was presumed to be punitive, and the Commonwealth failed to argue that there was an alternative, non-punitive reason for his detention. (Note: Other branches of government under Australia's separation of powers are still able to detain people without involvement of the Judiciary; but this may only occur when justified by some other non-punitive purpose. Some executive examples include; detention for immigration purposes, detention to prevent the spread of communicable diseases, or detention for public prevention after a sentence has concluded, for example under federal terrorist legislation or other state legislation. A legislative example is the ability of the Parliament to detain someone under contempt of Parliament.)

The Commonwealth attempted to argue that the plaintiff's detention was for purpose of his eventual deportation, a non-punitive purpose. However, because there was no real prospect of the plaintiff being removed from Australia in the reasonably foreseeable future, the court did not recognise this as an alternative, valid purpose justifying his detention.

The sections of the Migration Act, whilst invalid insofar as they applied to the plaintiff, remained valid when applied to authorise detention in other circumstances where justified by a non-punitive purpose. Judges explicitly noted post sentence detention is a justified purpose when it is for public protection under federal terrorist legislation or other state legislation.

== Background ==
The case concerned a stateless Rohingya man (anonymously referred to as 'NZYQ') born in Myanmar, who had arrived in Australia by boat in 2012. In 2016, the man was sentenced to five years imprisonment after pleading guilty to a sexual offence against a child. In 2018, the plaintiff was placed into immigration detention under s 189(1) of the Migration Act, following his release from criminal custody on parole. The man was subject to indefinite detention in Australia.

Indefinite detention in Australia was regarded as lawful in Australia under a limited set of circumstances due to the court's prior ruling in Al-Kateb v Godwin. NZYQ sued the Commonwealth and argued that the decision in Al-Kateb should be overturned.

== Judgment ==
The court unanimously overturned the 2004 decision in Al-Kateb v Godwin, a precedent that the Commonwealth sought to rely upon to support ss 189(1) and 196(1) of the Migration Act 1958 (Cth) enabling the indefinite detention of stateless persons.

The key finding in relation to NZYQ was that detention, in instances where there was no real prospects of removal of the alien to a receptive state, is prima facie punitive. This was a direct divergence from the so-called 'constitutional holding' of Al-Kateb, which had relevantly held that such detention was non-punitive and served a legitimate purpose. As punitive detention can only be a measure enacted by the judiciary, the exercise of such a power at the unfettered discretion of the executive was beyond the plenary powers of the government, and thus, was in breach of the separation of powers as per Ch III of the Australian Constitution. As a result, it was held that the Commonwealth did not have a lawful basis to continue detaining NZYQ, and the court demanded his release.

== Aftermath ==
The case resulted in the court effectively requiring the immediate release of 149 men from Australian immigration detention. Almost all of those released had criminal histories, the majority (116) being violent offenders, some being convicted murderers; they were said to be a danger to the community, creating political issues for the Albanese Government. The government responded by legislating a regime imposing strict visa conditions on the group of people released (including a requirement to wear electronic monitoring devices and to remain at a specified location between certain hours), with mandatory minimum prison sentences of one year for those breaching the conditions.

These additional measures, such as mandated ankle bracelets, were criticised by Sanmati Verma of the Human Rights Law Centre, noting that Australian offenders convicted of serious offences are already able to re-enter the community after their sentence. The curfew and monitoring conditions were subsequently declared invalid by the High Court in YBFZ v Minister for Immigration, Citizenship and Multicultural Affairs.

In October 2025, Australia started to deport people released under the NZYQ ruling to the island nation of Nauru. This is part of an initially secret deal, since made public, to resettle the hundreds of detainees freed under the NZYQ decision.

== Additional challenges ==
On 10 May 2024, the High Court decided ASF17 v Commonwealth of Australia. This decision upheld the detention of bisexual Iranian national ASF17, holding that individuals who have the medical capacity to consent to being removed from Australia, but choose not to, are not required to be released, noting that unlike NZYQ, the deportation of ASF17 was "reasonably capable of being achieved". ASF17 arrived in 2013 and his protection visa claim had been rejected. He has been detained continuously since 2014. He has never been charged or convicted with any offense in Australia, unlike most of the NZYQ cohort that were released. Also unlike the NZYQ cohort, ASF17 could have been deported to Iran if he had cooperated with the government by agreeing to meet with Iranian officials to obtain a travel document and consenting to his removal, as Iran does not admit returnees against their will. The government did not dispute he was bisexual and had previously had sex with men, nor that Iran has the death penalty for men who have sex with men. He said that he would accept being deported to any country that was not Iran and had repeatedly tried to get the government to do this, even saying "send me to Gaza", referencing the ongoing Gaza war, and that he faced "certain death" if deported to Iran. Iranian refugee AZC20, who intervened in the case, was released in 2021 by a judge due to his mental health deteriorating from his years spent in immigration detention. He may have been re-detained if he had not intervened in this case, as he also refused to cooperate with his removal. In his case, he had developed psychogenic mutism (mutism without any apparent physical cause) and could only communicate via writing. He had also attempted suicide multiple times, swallowing razor blades and overdosing on drugs. He had lost 25 kg (55 lb) whilst in detention. The judges ruled that, unlike AZC20 and other cases, ASF17 had never contended he did not have the capacity to consent. The Human Rights Law Centre, who represented AZC20, interpreted the judgment to mean "that for people like AZC20, who do not have the ability to consent to removal for medical, mental health or other reasons, a lack of cooperation will not justify indefinite detention". They also interpreted the judgment to mean that "for a person such as ASF17, a fear of harm is insufficient to preclude removal, irrespective of whether that claim might be genuine or well-founded".

On 6 November 2024, the High Court struck down the ankle bracelet and curfew conditions in a lawsuit brought by stateless Eritrean refugee YBFZ. The court said the conditions were "a form of extra-judicial collective punishment", and that for the conditions to be imposed on a person, it did not need to be proven that there was a "reasonably necessary" non-punitive purpose for them. The court said that the curfew was "neither trivial nor transient", persons being confined for one-third of each day, and the conspicuous ankle monitors would suggest to people that the person was "some kind of risk", which could degrade their autonomy. The government did not rule out further legislation in response to this decision.
