= Australian League of Immigration Volunteers =

Australian League of Immigration Volunteers was an Australian charity. Its main work focused on improving the lives of refugees through volunteering in Australian detention centres. ALIV was the only Australian charity that conducted programs within all immigration detention centres across Australia. ALIV was threatened with deregistration early in 2011, after speculation that it was being run on the principles of Scientology.

== Programs ==
ALIV's programs are for families in community detention, families in the community on bridging visas, as well as families experiencing difficulties because of the immigration process and/or experiences of torture and trauma in their countries of origin.

=== Kids and Family Programs ===
==== Kids excursion program ====
The kids program involves volunteers taking kids on activities every 4 weeks on a Saturday. It seeks to improve the happiness of the kids and their quality of life by linking them with their local communities and increasing their level of self-confidence.

Past programs include sailing, swimming, caving, rock-climbing, horse-riding and other sports; cultural shows, entertainment, recreation parks and museums.

The program seeks to have a positive impact on the happiness of the young people and on their quality of life.

==== Family excursion program ====
This program consists of volunteers taking families on activities every 4 weeks on a Saturday. It seeks to provide much needed recreation and bonding time for the families.

Past programs include the zoo, the beach, shows, ice-skating, ten-pin bowling, picnics, sporting days, fishing and cooking competitions.

==== ALIV Charities program ====
ALIV kids helping other charities in the community

In 2006 an ALIV kid said that he wanted to volunteer and help other people. This led to the initiation of the ALIV Charities Program. The program seeks to help the kids volunteering for other Australian charities. The kids are trained in balloon tying, face painting, magic tricks and other skills. They then use these skills to provide fun and entertainment for disadvantaged, disabled and hospitalised children in the community.

Past programs include performances at Starlight Rooms in Westmead and Randwick Children's Hospitals, Stewart House, Camp Quality, Magic Mania, Harmony Day Festival and Deaf Society Fair.

In October 2006, two ALIV Charities Program kids received STARTTS Humanitarian Awards in recognition of their work in helping other Australian kids

==== ALIV Teens Program ====
This program consists of volunteers taking families on activities every 4 weeks on a Saturday. It seeks to develop kids in transition between the Kids and Charities program. The program seeks to be development focused and to assist kids in graduating into the Charity program.

Past programs include cooking workshops, dance classes, group activities such as the amazing race and recreational activities.

==== ALIV Protection Program ====
The ALIV Protection program seeks to assist and build kids aged 5 – 13 who are falling behind their peers in any one of a broad set of domains.

Past sessions have seen volunteers build educational, social, emotional, and literacy skills in targeted kids.

The most important part of Protection is fostering a close friendship between volunteer and child. Once a friendship exists, volunteers create and introduce developmental activities to meet the specific needs of a kid. Volunteers can expect to have FUN and build relationships with kids who will benefit massively from the attention.

This program does not appear to run at all and with no formalised training provided to volunteers other than an 'orientation' this program potentially place both the volunteer and child at further risk.

==== ALIV Homework Program ====
The ALIV Homework Program involve volunteers spending an hour a week after school with kids who need extra help with school. This is usually done at a local library or community centre. After homework there is usually some free time to get food or play sports.

==== ALIV Camps ====
ALIV conducts camps every school holidays. Camps seek to provide needed recreational time for the kids while exposing to places that fire their imaginations, expand their knowledge and encourages personal development.

=== Adult English Program ===
Adult English Programs are conducted by qualified ESL teachers and volunteer assistants on Saturday afternoons. They seek to provide interactive English classes for adults inside Immigration Detention Centres.

=== ALIV Villawood Programs ===
ALIV works with children, families and adults inside the centre and is planning to establish a full-time volunteer program enabling volunteers to work with detainees six days a week.

=== ALIV Christmas Island Program ===
ALIV Christmas Island Program is a program that sends volunteers to Christmas Immigration Detention Centre for a minimum duration of 4 weeks. The program seeks to provide people with the opportunity to put aside the politics and just do something good.

Volunteers work with all kinds of clients from kids, families and women to unaccompanied minors and men. Past activities have included arts & craft, sport, movie nights, English classes, cooking, music, multicultural activities and many more.

=== ALIV Darwin Programs ===
ALIV has been invited to bring their programs to Darwin Detention Centres.

== History ==
December 2001
Gary Taylor joined the United Nations Association of Australia (UNAA)
February 2002
Gary Taylor proposed a hands-on approach to the UNAA to improve conditions inside immigration detention centers. This proposal included camps, excursions and a kids room inside the detention centres.
June 2002
The program was approved in a meeting by Gary with the Minister of Immigration and Multicultural and Indigenous Affairs Philip Ruddock.
November 2002
The first camp was held for the kids from Villawood Immigration Detention Centre.
February 2003
ALIV builds the Rainbow Room at Villawood.
March 2003
First volunteers from UNAA and Edmund Rice Camps enter the Rainbow room to start programs with the kids.
April 2003
Volunteering opens up to the public. 60 volunteers in 2 weeks.
May 2003
First Villawood excursion to Disney on Ice.
June 2003
The Minister of Immigration and Multicultural and Indigenous Affairs Philip Ruddock in Refugee Week.
July 2003
Villawood kids program becomes its own non-profit-organization. ALIV is born!
October 2003
First ever family day for the families of Villawood.
Christmas 2003
4 volunteers spend Christmas with the kids at Villawood.
March 2004
First camp with the kids from Baxter Immigration Detention Centre.
June 2004
Volunteer English Class program starts at Villawood.
September 2004
First Family Excursion to include fathers.
March 2005
Buddy Program commences. Children accompanied by ALIV volunteers can go anywhere they want outside Villawood Detention Centre without security escort.
July 2005
Children and families released from Immigration Detention Centres and placed in community detention.
August 2005
ALIV starts programs with the kids and families in the community.
March 2006
ALIV Charity Program starts. ALIV kids starts helping other disadvantaged kids in the community.
ALIV Child Protection Program starts.
April 2006
ALIV starts Saturday organisation where management and admin volunteers comes in to organise all aspects of ALIV
June 2006
ALIV receives humanitarian award for its work with asylum seekers and refugees from the Red Cross on World Refugee Day
October 2006
ALIV receives Best Practice in Volunteer Management Award from National Australia Bank.

== Awards ==
- 2006 NAB Volunteer Award Winner
- 2006 Red Cross Humanitarian Award
