= Migration Act 1958 =

Act of the Parliament of Australia

Parliament of Australia
- Long title: An Act relating to the entry into, and presence in, Australia of aliens, and the departure or deportation from Australia of aliens and certain other persons
- Citation: No. 62 of 1958 or No. 62, 1958 as amended
- Territorial extent: States and territories of Australia
- Royal assent: 8 October 1958
- Introduced by: Alick Downer
- Status: Current legislation

The Migration Act 1958 (Cth) is an Act of the Parliament of Australia that governs immigration to Australia. It set up Australia’s universal visa system (or entry permits). Its long title is "An Act relating to the entry into, and presence in, Australia of aliens, and the departure or deportation from Australia of aliens and certain other persons."

The 1958 Act replaced the Immigration Restriction Act 1901, which had formed the basis of the White Australia policy, abolishing the infamous "dictation test", as well as removing many of the other discriminatory provisions in the 1901 Act. The 1958 Act has been amended a number of times.

Deportation decisions, provided for in section 18 the Act, are at the absolute discretion of the responsible Minister or his delegate. Deportation requires a specific deportation order (section 206) and applies to Australian permanent residents only. Removal is an automatic process applying to persons held in immigration detention and does not require any specific order to be made. (Section 198) It covers those persons who do not have a valid visa to be in Australia, whether their valid visa has expired or was cancelled.

== Legislative history ==
The original bill was introduced to the House of Representatives on 1 May 1958 by Alick Downer, the Minister for Immigration in the Menzies Government.

In 1966, the Holt government amended the Act through the Migration Act 1966. The amendments were relatively minor, dealing with decimalisation and identity documents for crew members of foreign vessels. Several sources have incorrectly identified the Migration Act 1966 as the vehicle through which the Holt government dismantled the White Australia policy. In fact, the government's actions in that area required no modification of the existing legislation, and were accomplished solely through ministerial decree.

The Migration Amendment Act 1983 substituted the words "immigrant" with "non-citizen", having the effect of removing all restrictions on entry by Australian citizens from the external territories such as the Cocos and Christmas Islands to the Australian mainland.

The Migration Legislation Amendment Act 1989 created a regime of administrative detention of "unlawful boat arrivals". Such detention was discretionary.

The Migration Reform Act 1992, which came into operation on 1 September 1994, adopted a mandatory detention policy obliging the government to detain all persons entering or being in the country without a valid visa, while their claim to remain in Australia is processed and security and health checks undertaken. Also at the same time the law was changed to permit indefinite detention, from the previous limit of 273 days. Mandatory detention has continued to be part of a campaign by successive Australian governments to stop people without a valid visa (typically asylum seekers) entering the country by boat. The policy has been varied since 1992 by the subsequent Howard, Rudd, Gillard, Abbott and Turnbull governments.

=== 2001: The Pacific Solution ===
On 27 September 2001, under Prime Minister John Howard, amendments were made to the 1958 Act by the enactment of Migration Legislation Amendment (Excision from the Migration Zone) (Consequential Provisions) Act 2001. Specifically, the new amendment allowed "offshore entry persons" to be taken to "declared countries", with Nauru and Papua New Guinea made "declared countries" under the Act. The implementation of this legislation became known as the Pacific Solution.

The policy is regarded as controversial and has been criticised by a number of organisations. The High Court of Australia in Al-Kateb v Godwin (2004) confirmed, by majority, the constitutionality of indefinite mandatory detention of aliens.

=== 2014: Character test ===
In December 2014, after Peter Dutton assumed the position of Minister for Immigration and Border Protection, the Migration Act was amended to impose a character test on visa applicants seeking to enter Australia and foreign non-citizens in Australia. These amendments included the introduction of a new mandatory cancellation provision under section 501(3A). Between the 2013–2014 and 2016–2017 financial years, the number of visa cancellations on character grounds increased by 1,400%. According to statistics released by the Department of Home Affairs, the top ten nationalities that featured in visa cancellations on character grounds in 2017 were New Zealand, the United Kingdom, Vietnam, Sudan, Fiji, Iraq, Tonga, Iran, China, and India.

Mandatory detention rules also apply to persons whose visa has been cancelled by the Minister, for example on character grounds, allowing such persons to be detained in immigration detention and deported, some after living in Australia for a long period.

Non-citizens facing visa cancellation can appeal to the Australian Administrative Appeals Tribunal (AAT), an independent tribunal which hears visa cancellation appeals. In December 2019, the New Zealand media company Stuff reported that 80% of appeals to the AAT were either rejected or affirmed the Australian Government's visa cancellation orders. The Australian Lawyers Alliance spokesperson Greg Barn alleged that the Morrison government had stacked the AAT with members of the governing Coalition parties to ensure outcomes favouring the Australian Government's deportation orders. In January 2021, TVNZ's 1News reported that 25% of New Zealand citizens in Australia subject to the 501 "character test" had successfully appealed against their deportations to the Administrative Appeals Tribunal. These figures included 21 in the 2019-2020 financial year and 38 in the 2020-2021 year.

=== 2018: Migration Amendment (Strengthening the Character Test) Bill 2018 ===
On 25 October 2018, the Australian Immigration Minister David Coleman introduced the Migration Amendment (Strengthening the Character Test) Bill 2018 in response to anecdotal reports by Australian police forces that some judges had reduced criminal sentences to avoid triggering the criminal record threshold for mandatory visa cancellations under Section 501. The proposed Bill did not differentiate between adult and under-18 year old offenders, allowing the deportation of adolescent offenders. Despite opposition from New Zealand High Commissioner Annette King, the Law Council of Australia, Australian Human Rights Commission, and the United Nations High Commissioner for Refugees (UNHCR), the Migration Amendment Bill 2018 passed its first reading on 25 October. However, the bill lapsed at the dissolution of the Australian Parliament on 11 April 2019, prior to the 2019 Australian federal election held on 18 May 2019.

=== 2018–2019: "Medevac bill" ===
The Home Affairs Legislation Amendment (Miscellaneous Measures) Bill 2018, dubbed the Medevac bill, introduced amendments to the Migration Act (and two other Acts), in order to give greater weight to medical opinion in allowing the medical evacuation of asylum seekers to Australia from Nauru (previously held in the Nauru Regional Processing Centre) and Manus Island (previously held in the Manus Regional Processing Centre). After discussion the amended bill passed in the House by 75 votes to 74 and passed in the Senate by 36 votes to 34, as the Home Affairs Legislation Amendment (Miscellaneous Measures) Act 2019.

However, the 2018 ruling was overturned in December 2019, after 37 votes to 35 supported the government's move to repeal the law.

=== 2020: Aboriginal Australians cannot be aliens ===
On 11 February 2020 the High Court of Australia, in a judgment affecting two court cases (Love v Commonwealth of Australia; Thoms v Commonwealth of Australia: [2020] HCA 3), first used the tripartite test in Mabo v Queensland (No 2) (1992) to determine Aboriginality of the two plaintiffs. The court then determined that if a person is thus deemed to be an Aboriginal Australian, they cannot be regarded as an alien in Australia, even if they hold foreign citizenship. The two men concerned, Daniel Love and Brendan Thomas, could not thus be deported as aliens under the provisions of the Migration Act 1958, after both had earlier been convicted of criminal offences and served time in prison until 2018.

The following day, Christian Porter, Attorney-General of Australia, said the decision created "an entirely new category of people in terms of what the government can and can’t do” a non-citizen non-alien, or "belonger". Porter said that the government would be looking to deport the small group of Aboriginal non-citizens who have committed serious offences in another way.

=== 2021: "Strengthening the Character Test" amendment bill ===
In 24 November 2021, the Australian House of Representatives introduced the Migration Amendment (Strengthening the Character Test) Bill 2021, which would expand the criteria of crimes allowing non-citizens to be deported from Australia including violence against a person, non-consensual sexual offenses, and convictions for common assault, bodily harm against another person, harm against a person's mental health, and family violence. Under the proposed law, non-citizens convicted of a serious crime involving violence and weapons that is subject to a two-year prison term is eligible to have their visa cancelled. The proposed bill passed its third reading at the House on 16 February 2022. It was introduced to the Australian Senate on 30 March 2022. Dr. Abul Rizvi, former Deputy Secretary of the Australian Department of Immigration, claimed that the proposed law could lead to a five-fold increase in deportations from Australia and adversely affect Australia-New Zealand bilateral relations.

=== 2022–current: Policy tweak and reversal ===
Following the 2022 Australian federal election held on 21 May 2022, the newly-elected Prime Minister Anthony Albanese indicated that while the Section 501 deportation policy would remain, he was open to "tweaking" the policy to take into account the amount of time an individual had lived in Australia. In addition, New Zealand Prime Minister Jacinda Ardern stated that she would press the Albanese Government on the 501 deportation policy, which had complicated Australia–New Zealand bilateral relations. During a state visit to Canberra in June 2022, Ardern discussed the 501 deportation policy with her Australian counterpart. In response, Albanese reiterated that he would look at addressing New Zealand's concerns about the deportation of its citizens.

During a second state visit by Ardern in early July 2022, Albanese reiterated his government's commitment to amending the Section 501 deportation policy to consider individuals' long-term connections to Australia. Ardern had reiterated the New Zealand Government's concerns that individuals with minimal or no connection to New Zealand were being deported. In response, Shadow Home Affairs Minister Karen Andrews expressed concerns that the Albanese government's plans to modify the Section 501 policy would allow foreign criminals to remain in Australia, endangering public safety and security.

On 1 February 2023, Immigration Minister Andrew Giles confirmed that the Australian Government would preserve the 501 deportation policy but issued a ministerial directive for the Department of Home Affairs to consider the duration of time that deportees have lived in Australia as well as their ties to Australia. The Australian Government will also continue to deport individuals who "pose a risk to the community." This directive comes into effect on 3 March 2023. This directive was known as Ministerial Direction 99 and stated that immigration officials and the Administrative Appeals Tribunal had to consider a person's communal ties and time spent in Australia before cancelling a visa. The announcement was welcomed by New Zealand Prime Minister Chris Hipkins. By contrast, deportee advocate Filipa Payne criticised the Australian Government's changes as insufficient, objecting to the mandatory detention policy and taking issue with the clause allowing the deportation of individuals deemed to pose a danger.

In late May 2024, Albanese and Giles announced that the Australian Government would rewrite Ministerial Directive 99 following criticism from Shadow immigration minister Dan Tehan and Opposition Leader Peter Dutton that the ministerial direction had allowed several non-citizens convicted of serious crimes including rape, drug smuggling, kidnapping and serious assault to remain in Australia. In response to Australian plans to rewrite Ministerial Directive 99, New Zealand Foreign Minister Winston Peters and Prime Minister Christopher Luxon expressed concern that the policy revision would lead to the deportation of New Zealanders with little connection to New Zealand but said they would work with their Australian counterparts to address New Zealand's concerns. On 7 June 2024, Giles issued a revised ministerial directive called "Direction 110" which stated that violent non-citizen criminals could be deported even if they had lived their whole lives in Australia. In addition, Giles reinstated the visa cancellations for 40 individuals, who had previously had their visa cancellations overturned under the previous Directive 99.

== Human Rights Commission review ==
A 1985 report by the Australian Human Rights Commission found that "two groups whose human rights are most at risk in the administration of the Act are disabled persons and persons who have become Prohibited Non-Citizens". The Commission recommended that withholding of an entry permit only be on health (not disability) grounds. It said the Act was largely a machinery measure, with an emphasis on processes relating to entry to, and enforced departure from, Australia, which did not contain a statement of principles but works by conferring extensive discretions on the Minister and officers of the Department. The Commission considered the criteria on which the discretions should be exercised should be stated in the legislation.

== See also ==
- Al-Kateb v Godwin
- Graham v Minister for Immigration and Border Protection
- Asylum in Australia
- Immigration detention in Australia
- Immigration to Australia
