= Candidates of the 1953 Australian Senate election =

This article provides information on candidates who stood for the 1953 Australian Senate election. The election was held on 9 May 1953.

== By-elections, appointments and defections ==
=== By-elections and appointments ===
- On 7 February 1952, Joe Cooke (Labor) was appointed a Western Australian Senator to replace Richard Nash (Labor).
- On 30 September 1952, Bill Robinson (Country) was appointed a Western Australian Senator to replace Edmund Piesse (Country).
- On 3 March 1953, John Marriott (Liberal) was appointed a Tasmanian Senator to replace Jack Chamberlain (Liberal).

=== Defections ===
- In 1953, Labor Senator Bill Morrow (Tasmania) was defeated for preselection. He contested the election as a member of his own party, the "Tasmanian Labor Party".

== Retiring Senators ==
=== Labor ===
- Senator Alex Finlay (SA)

=== Liberal ===
- Senator John Tate (NSW)

== Senate ==
Sitting Senators are shown in bold text. Tickets that elected at least one Senator are highlighted in the relevant colour. Successful candidates are identified by an asterisk (*).

=== New South Wales ===
Five seats were up for election. The Labor Party was defending three seats. The Liberal-Country Coalition was defending two seats. Senators John Armstrong (Labor), Bill Ashley (Labor), John McCallum (Liberal), Albert Reid (Country) and Bill Spooner (Liberal) were not up for re-election.

Labor candidates	Coalition candidates	Communist candidates	Ungrouped candidates
1. **Stan Amour***; 2. **James Arnold***; 3. **Donald Grant***	1. **Alister McMullin*** (Lib); 2. Ken Anderson* (Lib); 3. Thelma Kirkby (CP)	1. Jim Healy; 2. Claude Jones; 3. Cecil Connors	Robert Stafford; Hanse Goleby; Edward Spensley

=== Queensland ===
Five seats were up for election. The Labor Party was defending two seats. The Liberal-Country Coalition was defending three seats. Senators Archie Benn (Labor), Walter Cooper (Country), Ben Courtice (Labor), Neil O'Sullivan (Liberal) and Annabelle Rankin (Liberal) were not up for re-election.

Labor candidates	Coalition candidates	Communist candidates	Democratic candidates
1. **Condon Byrne***; 2. **Gordon Brown***; 3. William Conelan	1. **Ted Maher*** (CP); 2. **Ian Wood*** (Lib); 3. **Roy Kendall*** (Lib)	1. Albert Robinson; 2. Max Julius; 3. Tom Millar	1. Sir Raphael Cilento; 2. Henry Herbert; 3. Charles Russell

=== South Australia ===
Five seats were up for election. The Labor Party was defending three seats. The Liberal Party was defending two seats. Senators Clive Hannaford (Liberal), Ted Mattner (Liberal), George McLeay (Liberal), Theo Nicholls (Labor) and Sid O'Flaherty (Labor) were not up for re-election.

Labor candidates	Liberal candidates	Communist candidates	Ungrouped candidates
1. **Jack Critchley***; 2. **John Ryan***; 3. Jim Toohey*	1. **Rex Pearson***; 2. **Keith Laught***; 3. Frederick Boscombe	1. Edward Robertson; 2. Alan Finger; 3. Elliott Johnston	Sydney Edwards

=== Tasmania ===
Six seats were up for election. One of these was a short-term vacancy caused by Liberal Senator Jack Chamberlain's death; this had been filled in the interim by Liberal John Marriott. The Labor Party was defending four seats (although sitting senator Bill Morrow contested the election for the "Tasmanian Labour Group"). The Liberal Party was defending two seats. Senators Allan Guy (Liberal), Denham Henty (Liberal), Nick McKenna (Labor) and Reg Wright (Liberal) were not up for re-election.

Labor candidates	Liberal candidates	Tasmanian Labour Group candidates	Ungrouped candidates
1. **George Cole***; 2. **Justin O'Byrne***; 3. Reg Murray; 4. **Bill Aylett***	1. **Robert Wordsworth***; 2. **John Marriott***; 3. Robert Wardlaw*; 4. Cedric Moore	1. **Bill Morrow**; 2. Andrew Graham; 3. Ian Pearson	Max Bound (CPA); Robert McEwin

=== Victoria ===
Five seats were up for election. The Labor Party was defending two seats. The Liberal Party was defending three seats. Senators Don Cameron (Labor), George Rankin (Country), Charles Sandford (Labor), Jim Sheehan (Labor) and John Spicer (Liberal) were not up for re-election.

Labor candidates	Liberal candidates	Communist candidates	HGJP candidates
1. **Bert Hendrickson***; 2. **Jack Devlin***; 3. Pat Kennelly*	1. **John Gorton***; 2. **Ivy Wedgwood***; 3. **Magnus Cormack**	1. Ralph Gibson; 2. Bill Bird; 3. Frank Hardy	1. Leslie Bawden; 2. William Pitt; 3. Ivan Robinson

=== Western Australia ===
Six seats were up for election. One of these was a short-term vacancy caused by Country Party Senator Edmund Piesse's death; this had been filled in the interim by Bill Robinson, also of the Country Party. The Labor Party was defending two seats. The Liberal-Country Coalition was defending four seats. Senators Agnes Robertson (Liberal), Dorothy Tangney (Labor), Seddon Vincent (Liberal) and Don Willesee (Labor) were not up for re-election.

Labor candidates	Coalition candidates	Communist candidates	APGL candidates	Ind Co-op candidates
1. **Joe Cooke***; 2. **James Fraser***; 3. John Harris*; 4. Charlie Golding	1. **Malcolm Scott*** (Lib); 2. **Harrie Seward*** (CP); 3. **Shane Paltridge*** (Lib); 4. **Bill Robinson** (CP)	1. Sam Aarons; 2. Jack Coleman; 3. John Gandini	1. Carlyle Ferguson; 2. Colin Unwin	1. Claude Swaine; 2. Robert Salter

== Summary by party ==
Beside each party is an indication of whether the party contested the Senate election in each state.

Party	NSW	Vic	Qld	WA	SA	Tas	Total
Australian Labor Party	*	*	*	*	*	*	6
Liberal Party of Australia	*	*	*	*	*	*	6
Australian Country Party	*		*	*			3
Communist Party of Australia	*	*	*	*	*	*	6
Henry George Justice Party		*					1
Democratic Party of Australia			*				1
All Parties Government League				*			1
Independent Co-operationist				*			1
Tasmanian Labor Party						*	1

== See also ==
- 1953 Australian Senate election
- Members of the Australian Senate, 1951–1953
- Members of the Australian Senate, 1953–1956
- List of political parties in Australia
