= Candidates of the 1951 Australian federal election =

This article provides information on candidates who stood for the 1951 Australian federal election. The election was held on 28 April 1951.

== By-elections, appointments and defections ==
=== Defections ===
- In 1951, Country Party MP Charles Russell (Maranoa) was expelled from the party for advocating the appreciation of the pound. He contested the election as an independent.

== Retiring Members and Senators ==
=== Labor ===
- Jack Holloway MP (Melbourne Ports, Vic)
- Senator Fred Beerworth (SA)

=== Liberal ===
- Dame Enid Lyons MP (Darwin, Tas)
- Percy Spender MP (Warringah, NSW)
- Senator Wilfrid Simmonds (Qld)

== House of Representatives ==
Sitting members at the time of the election are shown in bold text. Successful candidates are highlighted in the relevant colour. Where there is possible confusion, an asterisk (*) is also used.

=== Australian Capital Territory ===
Electorate	Held by	Labor candidate	Liberal candidate	Independent candidates
Australian Capital Territory	Independent	Jim Fraser	Clyde Greenwood	Jessie Ashton; **Lewis Nott**

=== New South Wales ===
Electorate	Held by	Labor candidate	Coalition candidate	Other candidates
Banks	Labor	**Eric Costa**	George Roffey (Lib)	
Barton	Labor	**H. V. Evatt**	Nancy Wake (Lib)	
Bennelong	Liberal	William Fitzgibbon	**John Cramer** (Lib)	
Blaxland	Labor	**Eli Harrison**	Jim Dennison (Lib)	
Bradfield	Liberal	Hugh Milne	**Billy Hughes** (Lib)	
Calare	Liberal	John Howell	**John Howse** (Lib)	Archibald Gardiner (Ind)
Cook	Labor	**Tom Sheehan**	Roy Hatfield (Lib)	Harry Hatfield (CPA)
Cowper	Country	William Bailey	**Sir Earle Page** (CP)	William Tomlinson (Ind)
Cunningham	Labor	**Billy Davies**	Alan Thomson (Lib)	Eric Aarons (CPA)
Dalley	Labor	**Sol Rosevear**	John Laffin (Lib)	
Darling	Labor	**Joe Clark**	Elson Whyte (CP)	
East Sydney	Labor	**Eddie Ward**	Allan Stewart (Lib)	
Eden-Monaro	Labor	**Allan Fraser**	Bill Keys (Lib)	
Evans	Liberal	Robert Bailey	**Frederick Osborne** (Lib)	
Farrer	Liberal	Daniel Byrnes	**David Fairbairn** (Lib)	
Grayndler	Labor	**Fred Daly**	Roy Squire (Lib)	William McCristal (ARP)
Gwydir	Country	Norman Ferguson	**Thomas Treloar** (CP)	
Hume	Country	Arthur Fuller	**Charles Anderson** (CP)	
Hunter	Labor	**Rowley James**	Ted Fletcher (Lib)	Arthur English (Ind); Evan Phillips (CPA)
Kingsford-Smith	Labor	**Gordon Anderson**	Arthur Butterell (Lib)	
Lang	Labor	**Dan Mulcahy**	Robert Bruce (Lib)	Roy Boyd (CPA)
Lawson	Country	Alan Manning	**Laurie Failes** (CP)	
Lowe	Liberal	John Burton	**William McMahon** (Lib)	
Lyne	Country	Edward Hayes	**Jim Eggins** (CP)	Joe Cordner (Ind)
Macarthur	Liberal	William McDonnell	**Jeff Bate** (Lib)	
Mackellar	Liberal	Thomas Sherley	**Bill Wentworth** (Lib)	
Macquarie	Labor	**Ben Chifley**	Bob Cotton (Lib)	
Martin	Labor	**William O'Connor**	George Read (Lib)	Terry Gordon (CPA); Malinda Ivey (Ind)
Mitchell	Liberal	Joseph White	**Roy Wheeler** (Lib)	Mel McCalman (CPA)
New England	Country	William Wilson	**David Drummond** (CP)	
Newcastle	Labor	**David Watkins**	Roy Stewart (Lib)	Laurie Aarons (CPA)
North Sydney	Liberal	Eileen Powell	**William Jack** (Lib)	
Parkes	Labor	**Les Haylen**	Dick Dein (Lib)	
Parramatta	Liberal	John Holmes	**Howard Beale** (Lib)	
Paterson	Liberal	Cecil Robinson	**Allen Fairhall** (Lib)	
Phillip	Labor	**Joe Fitzgerald**	Les Fingleton (Lib)	
Reid	Labor	**Charles Morgan**	Jim Clough (Lib)	Rupert Sheldon (Ind)
Richmond	Country	Alexander Bryen	**Larry Anthony** (CP)	
Riverina	Country	Michael Sheehan	**Hugh Roberton** (CP)	Les Kelton (CPA)
Robertson	Liberal	Walter Geraghty	**Roger Dean** (Lib)	
Shortland	Labor	**Charles Griffiths**	Arthur Downey (Lib)	
St George	Liberal	Nelson Lemmon	**Bill Graham** (Lib)	
Warringah	Liberal	Frank McCullum	Francis Bland (Lib)	
Watson	Labor	**Dan Curtin**	Donald Clark (Lib)	
Wentworth	Liberal	Cecil Trevelyan	**Eric Harrison** (Lib)	
Werriwa	Labor	**Bert Lazzarini**	Ian Griffith (Lib)	
West Sydney	Labor	**Dan Minogue**	Basil Mottershead (Lib)	Jack Miles (CPA); Clare Peters (Ind Lab)

=== Northern Territory ===
Electorate	Held by	Labor candidate	Country candidate	Independent candidates
Northern Territory	Labor	**Jock Nelson**	Ralph Edwards	Jessie Litchfield

=== Queensland ===
Electorate	Held by	Labor candidate	Coalition candidate	Other candidates
Bowman	Liberal	Michael Lyons	**Malcolm McColm** (Lib)	Mabel Hanson (CPA)
Brisbane	Labor	**George Lawson**	Donagh McDonagh (Lib)	Alby Graham (CPA)
Capricornia	Liberal	Mick Gardner	**George Pearce** (Lib)	
Darling Downs	Liberal		**Reginald Swartz** (Lib)	
Dawson	Country	George Hyde	**Charles Davidson** (CP)	
Fisher	Country	Geoffrey Arnell	**Charles Adermann** (CP)	
Griffith	Liberal	William Thieme	**Doug Berry** (Lib)	
Herbert	Labor	**Bill Edmonds**	Doug Jeffrey (CP)	Gloria Phelan (CPA)
Kennedy	Labor	**Bill Riordan**	Ulick Browne (CP)	
Leichhardt	Country	Harry Bruce	**Tom Gilmore** (CP)	Richard Anear (CPA)
Lilley	Liberal	Jim Hadley	**Bruce Wight** (Lib)	Walter Collings (Ind)
McPherson	Country		**Arthur Fadden** (CP)	John Rosser (Ind)
Maranoa	Country	Alfred Dohring	Wilfred Brimblecombe (CP)	**Charles Russell** (Ind)
Moreton	Liberal	Ted Mansfield	**Josiah Francis** (Lib)	Bill Yarrow (CPA)
Oxley	Liberal	Andrew Crilly	**Donald Cameron** (Lib)	Frank O'Connor (CPA)
Petrie	Liberal	Patrick Bredhauer	**Alan Hulme** (Lib)	
Ryan	Liberal	Frank Luton	**Nigel Drury** (Lib)	
Wide Bay	Country	Thomas Wallace	**Bernard Corser** (CP)	

=== South Australia ===
Electorate	Held by	Labor candidate	Liberal candidate	Other candidates
Adelaide	Labor	**Cyril Chambers**	Thomas Phillips	Edward Robertson (CPA)
Angas	Liberal	John Edwards	**Alick Downer**	
Barker	Liberal	Jim Corcoran	**Archie Cameron**	Charles Lloyd (Ind); Frank Rieck (Ind)
Boothby	Liberal	Len Wright	**John McLeay**	
Grey	Labor	**Edgar Russell**	Edward Andrews	
Hindmarsh	Labor	**Clyde Cameron**		
Kingston	Liberal	Pat Galvin	**Jim Handby**	Eric Stead (CPA)
Port Adelaide	Labor	**Albert Thompson**	John Caskey	Alan Finger (CPA)
Sturt	Liberal	Leslie McMullin	**Keith Wilson**	
Wakefield	Liberal	Cyril Hasse	**Philip McBride**	

=== Tasmania ===
Electorate	Held by	Labor candidate	Liberal candidate
Bass	Liberal	Colman O'Byrne	**Bruce Kekwick**
Darwin	Liberal	Clem Foster; Max Poulter	Aubrey Luck
Denison	Liberal	Mervyn McNeair	**Athol Townley**
Franklin	Liberal	Jack Frost	**Bill Falkinder**
Wilmot	Labor	**Gil Duthie**	Lionel Browning

=== Victoria ===
Electorate	Held by	Labor candidate	Coalition candidate	Other candidates
Balaclava	Liberal	Arthur Lewis	**Thomas White** (Lib)	
Ballaarat	Liberal	Bob Joshua	**Alan Pittard** (Lib)	
Batman	Labor	**Alan Bird**	Fred Capp (Lib)	
Bendigo	Labor	**Percy Clarey**	Charles Carty-Salmon (Lib)	
Burke	Labor	**Ted Peters**	Alfred Wall (Lib)	
Chisholm	Liberal	Ronald Whiting	**Wilfrid Kent Hughes** (Lib)	
Corangamite	Liberal	Angus McLean	**Allan McDonald** (Lib)	
Corio	Liberal	John Dedman	**Hubert Opperman** (Lib)	
Darebin	Labor	**Tom Andrews**	Gordon Savage (Lib)	
Deakin	Liberal	Gordon Bryant	**Frank Davis** (Lib)	Eric Butler (Ind)
Fawkner	Labor	**Bill Bourke**	Peter Howson (Lib)	Colin Kennedy (Ind)
Flinders	Liberal	Keith Ewert	**Rupert Ryan** (Lib)	Robert Hipwell (Ind)
Gellibrand	Labor	**Jack Mullens**	Gordon Trewin (Lib)	Alex Dobbin (CPA)
Gippsland	Country	Victor Fitzgerald	**George Bowden** (CP)	
Henty	Liberal	Percy Treyvaud	**Jo Gullett** (Lib)	Doris McRae (CPA)
Higgins	Liberal	Benjamin Nicholas	**Harold Holt** (Lib)	Mary Kent Hughes (Ind)
Higinbotham	Liberal	Geoffrey Sowerbutts	**Frank Timson** (Lib)	
Hoddle	Labor	**Jack Cremean**	Jack Easton (Lib)	Leslie Loye (CPA)
Indi	Liberal	Charles Edmondson	**William Bostock** (Lib)	
Isaacs	Liberal	John Bourke	**William Haworth** (Lib)	Sam Goldbloom (Ind Lab)
Kooyong	Liberal	Maurice Sheehy	**Robert Menzies** (Lib)	Ted Laurie (CPA)
La Trobe	Liberal	Bernard Rees	**Richard Casey** (Lib)	
Lalor	Labor	**Reg Pollard**	Allen Bateman (Lib)	
Mallee	Country	Alfred O'Connor	**Winton Turnbull** (CP)	
Maribyrnong	Labor	**Arthur Drakeford**	Stuart Collie (Lib)	
McMillan	Liberal	Horace Hawkins	**Geoffrey Brown** (Lib)	Fred Charlesworth (CPA)
Melbourne	Labor	**Arthur Calwell**	Desmond Byrne (Lib)	Gerry O'Day (CPA)
Melbourne Ports	Labor	Frank Crean	Michael Prowse (Lib)	
Murray	Country	Gordon Anderson	**John McEwen** (CP)	
Wannon	Liberal	Don McLeod	**Dan Mackinnon** (Lib)	
Wills	Labor	**Bill Bryson**	Baden Grafen (Lib)	Doris Blackburn (Prog Lab)
Wimmera	Liberal	Cyril Sudholz	**William Lawrence** (Lib)	
Yarra	Labor	**Stan Keon**	Kenneth Bisney (Lib)	Ken Miller (CPA)

=== Western Australia ===
Electorate	Held by	Labor candidate	Coalition candidate	Communist candidate
Canning	Country	Percy Munday	**Len Hamilton** (CP)	
Curtin	Liberal	John Henshaw	**Paul Hasluck** (Lib)	
Forrest	Liberal	Frederick O'Connor	**Gordon Freeth** (Lib)	
Fremantle	Labor	**Kim Beazley**	Len Seaton (Lib)	
Kalgoorlie	Labor	**Herbert Johnson**		
Moore	Country	Arthur Hunter	**Hugh Leslie** (CP)	
Perth	Labor	**Tom Burke**	Billy Snedden (Lib)	James Kelly
Swan	Liberal	Harry Webb	**Bill Grayden** (Lib)	Alex Jolly

== Senate ==
Sitting Senators are shown in bold text. Since this was a double dissolution, all senators were up for re-election, with the first five from each state elected to six-year terms and the remaining five to three-year terms. Tickets that elected at least one Senator are highlighted in the relevant colour. Successful candidates are identified by an asterisk (*).

=== New South Wales ===
Ten seats were up for election. The Labor Party was defending six seats. The Liberal-Country Coalition was defending four seats.

Labor candidates	Coalition candidates	Communist candidates	PPP candidates	Ungrouped candidates
1. **Bill Ashley***; 2. **John Armstrong***; 3. **James Arnold***; 4. **Donald Grant***; 5. **Stan Amour***; 6. **William Large**	1. **Bill Spooner*** (Lib); 2. **Albert Reid*** (CP); 3. **John McCallum*** (Lib); 4. **John Tate*** (Lib); 5. Alister McMullin* (Lib); 6. Thelma Kirkby (CP)	1. Richard Dixon; 2. Jim Healy; 3. Joe Bailes; 4. Edgar Ross; 5. Nellie Simm; 6. Cecil Connors	1. Ronald Sarina; 2. James Fowler	Edward Spensley (Ind); Robert Anstee (Ind); Jack Lang (LL); William Webb (Ind)

=== Queensland ===
Ten seats were up for election. The Labor Party was defending three seats. The Liberal-Country Coalition was defending seven seats.

Labor candidates	Coalition candidates	Communist candidates	Ungrouped candidates
1. **Ben Courtice***; 2. **Archie Benn***; 3. **Gordon Brown***; 4. Condon Byrne*; 5. Samuel Martin; 6. Austin Elliott	1. **Walter Cooper*** (CP); 2. **Neil O'Sullivan*** (Lib); 3. **Annabelle Rankin*** (Lib); 4. **Ted Maher*** (CP); 5. **Ian Wood*** (Lib); 6. **Roy Kendall*** (Lib)	1. Fred Paterson; 2. Max Julius; 3. Alex Macdonald; 4. Frank Falls; 5. Tom Millar; 6. Jim Peterson	Frank Barnes; Clifford Banks

=== South Australia ===
Ten seats were up for election. The Labor Party was defending seven seats. The Liberal Party was defending three seats.

Labor candidates	Liberal candidates	Ungrouped candidates
1. **Sid O'Flaherty***; 2. **Theo Nicholls***; 3. **Jack Critchley***; 4. **Alex Finlay***; 5. **John Ryan***; 6. **Frederick Ward**	1. **Ted Mattner***; 2. **George McLeay***; 3. **Clive Hannaford***; 4. Rex Pearson*; 5. Keith Laught*; 6. Basil Proctor	Henry Schneider; John Sendy (CPA); John Gartner

=== Tasmania ===
Ten seats were up for election. The Labor Party was defending six seats. The Liberal Party was defending four seats.

Labor candidates	Liberal candidates	Communist candidates
1. **Bill Morrow***; 2. **Nick McKenna***; 3. Charles Lamp; 4. **Justin O'Byrne***; 5. **Bill Aylett***; 6. **George Cole***; 7. **Reg Murray**	1. Jack Chamberlain*; 2. **Allan Guy***; 3. **Denham Henty***; 4. John Marriott; 5. **Robert Wordsworth***; 6. **Reg Wright***	1. Jack Lynch; 2. Max Bound

=== Victoria ===
Ten seats were up for election. The Labor Party was defending six seats. The Liberal-Country Coalition was defending four seats.

Labor candidates	Coalition candidates	Communist candidates	HGJP candidates
1. **Don Cameron***; 2. **Charles Sandford***; 3. **Jim Sheehan***; 4. **Jack Devlin***; 5. **Bert Hendrickson***; 6. **Fred Katz**	1. **John Spicer*** (Lib); 2. **George Rankin*** (CP); 3. **John Gorton*** (Lib); 4. **Ivy Wedgwood*** (Lib); 5. Magnus Cormack* (Lib); 6. William Moss (CP)	1. Ralph Gibson; 2. Bill Bird; 3. Bill Tregear; 4. Agnes Doig; 5. Ted Bull; 6. Paddy O'Donoghue	1. Leslie Bawden; 2. Lance Hutchinson; 3. Walter Tindall

=== Western Australia ===
Ten seats were up for election. The Labor Party was defending six seats. The Liberal-Country Coalition was defending four seats.

Labor candidates	Coalition candidates	Communist candidates	Ungrouped candidates
1. **Dorothy Tangney***; 2. **Don Willesee***; 3. **James Fraser***; 4. **Richard Nash***; 5. **Joe Cooke**; 6. **John Harris**	1. **Agnes Robertson*** (Lib); 2. **Seddon Vincent*** (Lib); 3. **Edmund Piesse*** (CP); 4. **Malcolm Scott*** (Lib); 5. Harrie Seward* (CP); 6. Shane Paltridge* (Lib)	1. Kevin Healy; 2. Pat Hurd; 3. Jack Coleman	Carlyle Ferguson (APA); Robert Salter

== Summary by party ==
Beside each party is the number of seats contested by that party in the House of Representatives for each state, as well as an indication of whether the party contested Senate elections in each state.

Party	NSW		Vic		Qld		WA		SA		Tas		ACT	NT	Total	
Party	HR	S	HR	S	HR	S	HR	S	HR	S	HR	S	HR	HR	HR	S
Australian Labor Party	47	*	33	*	17	*	8	*	10	*	6	*	1	1	123	6
Liberal Party of Australia	39	*	30	*	10	*	5	*	9	*	5	*	1		99	6
Australian Country Party	8	*	3	*	8	*	2	*						1	22	4
Communist Party of Australia	9	*	7	*	6	*	2	*	3	*		*			27	6
Australian Republican Party	1														1	
Protestant People's Party		*														1
Lang Labor		*														1
Henry George Justice Party				*												1
All Parties Administration								*								1
Independent and other	7		5		2				2				2	1	19	

== See also ==
- 1951 Australian federal election
- Members of the Australian House of Representatives, 1949–1951
- Members of the Australian House of Representatives, 1951–1954
- Members of the Australian Senate, 1950–1951
- Members of the Australian Senate, 1951–1953
- List of political parties in Australia
