= Members of the Australian Senate, 1951–1953 =

Senate composition at 12 June 1951
Government (32) - (2 seat majority)
Liberal (26)
Country Party (6)

Opposition (28)
Labor (28)

This is a list of members of the Australian Senate from 1951 to 1953. The 28 April 1951 election was a double dissolution called by Prime Minister of Australia Robert Menzies in an attempt to gain control of the Senate and to pass the Commonwealth Bank Bill, if necessary at a joint sitting of both houses. All 121 seats in the House of Representatives, and all 60 seats in the Senate were up for election. The incumbent Liberal Party of Australia led by Menzies with coalition partner the Country Party led by Arthur Fadden defeated the Australian Labor Party led by Ben Chifley and gained control of the Senate with 32 seats to Labor's 28.

In accordance with section 13 of the Constitution, terms for senators was taken to commence on 1 July 1950. The first five senators elected in each state were allocated the full six-year terms ending on 30 June 1956 while the other half were allocated three-year terms ending on 30 June 1953.

The Commonwealth Bank Bill was presented to Parliament again on 26 June 1951 and passed both houses.

Senator	Party	State	Term ending	Years in office
Stan Amour	Labor	New South Wales	1953	1938–1965
John Armstrong	Labor	New South Wales	1956	1938–1962
James Arnold	Labor	New South Wales	1953	1941–1965
Bill Ashley	Labor	New South Wales	1956	1938–1962
Bill Aylett	Labor	Tasmania	1953	1938–1965
Archie Benn	Labor	Queensland	1956	1950–1968
Gordon Brown (Note: Father of the Senate)	Labor	Queensland	1953	1932–1965
Condon Byrne	Labor	Queensland	1953	1951–1959, 1968–1974
Don Cameron	Labor	Victoria	1956	1938–1962
Jack Chamberlain (Note: Liberal Senator Jack Chamberlain died on 16 January 1953; Liberal member John Marriott was appointed to fill the ensuing vacancy on 3 March, expiring at the May 1953 Senate election, when he was elected to a six year term expiring on 30 June 1959. Robert Wardlaw was elected to the vacancy expiring on 30 June 1956.)	Liberal	Tasmania	1956	1951–1953
George Cole	Labor	Tasmania	1953	1950–1965
Joe Cooke (Note: Labor Senator Richard Nash died on 12 December 1951; former Labor Senator Joe Cooke was appointed to fill the ensuing vacancy on 7 February 1952.)	Labor	Western Australia	1953	1947–1951, 1952–1965
Walter Cooper	Country	Queensland	1956	1928–1932, 1935–1968
Magnus Cormack	Liberal	Victoria	1953	1951–1953, 1962–1978
Ben Courtice	Labor	Queensland	1956	1937–1962
Jack Critchley	Labor	South Australia	1953	1947–1959
Jack Devlin	Labor	Victoria	1953	1946–1957
Alex Finlay	Labor	South Australia	1953	1944–1953
James Fraser	Labor	Western Australia	1953	1938–1959
John Gorton	Liberal	Victoria	1953	1950–1968
Donald Grant	Labor	New South Wales	1953	1944–1959
Allan Guy	Liberal	Tasmania	1956	1950–1956
Clive Hannaford	Liberal	South Australia	1956	1950–1967
Bert Hendrickson	Labor	Victoria	1953	1947–1971
Denham Henty	Liberal	Tasmania	1956	1950–1968
Roy Kendall	Liberal	Queensland	1953	1950–1965
Keith Laught	Liberal	South Australia	1953	1951–1969
Ted Maher	Country	Queensland	1953	1950–1965
John Marriott	Liberal	Tasmania	1953, (Note: Appointed to a casual vacancy and only held office until the earlier of the next election for the House of Representatives or the Senate.) 1959	1953, 1953–1975
Ted Mattner	Liberal	South Australia	1956	1944–1946, 1950–1968
John McCallum	Liberal	New South Wales	1956	1950–1962
Nick McKenna	Labor	Tasmania	1956	1944–1968
George McLeay	Liberal	South Australia	1956	1935–1947, 1950–1955
Alister McMullin	Liberal	New South Wales	1953	1951–1971
Bill Morrow	Labor/Independent (Note: Morrow resigned from the ALP on 9 April 1953 after being disendorsed, and unsuccessfully sought re-election at the head of a "Tasmanian Labour Group" ticket.)	Tasmania	1953	1947–1953
Richard Nash	Labor	Western Australia	1953	1943–1951
Theo Nicholls	Labor	South Australia	1956	1944–1968
Justin O'Byrne	Labor	Tasmania	1953	1947–1981
Sid O'Flaherty	Labor	South Australia	1956	1944–1962
Neil O'Sullivan	Liberal	Queensland	1956	1947–1962
Shane Paltridge	Liberal	Western Australia	1953	1951–1966
Rex Pearson	Liberal	South Australia	1953	1951–1961
Edmund Piesse (Note: Country Party Senator Edmund Piesse died on 25 August 1952; Country Party member Bill Robinson was appointed to fill the ensuing vacancy on 30 September, but was fourth on the Coalition ticket at the 9 May 1953 election and was defeated for the seat by Liberal Senator Shane Paltridge.)	Country	Western Australia	1956	1950–1952
Dame Annabelle Rankin	Liberal	Queensland	1956	1947–1971
George Rankin	Country	Victoria	1956	1950–1956
Albert Reid	Country	New South Wales	1956	1950–1962
Agnes Robertson	Liberal	Western Australia	1956	1950–1962
Bill Robinson	Country	Western Australia	1953	1952–1953
John Ryan	Labor	South Australia	1953	1950–1959
Charles Sandford	Labor	Victoria	1956	1947–1956, 1957–1966
Malcolm Scott	Liberal	Western Australia	1953	1950–1971
Harrie Seward	Country	Western Australia	1953	1951–1958
Jim Sheehan	Labor	Victoria	1956	1938–1940, 1944–1962
John Spicer	Liberal	Victoria	1956	1940–1944, 1950–1956
Bill Spooner	Liberal	New South Wales	1956	1950–1965
Dame Dorothy Tangney	Labor	Western Australia	1956	1943–1968
John Tate	Liberal	New South Wales	1953	1950–1953
Seddon Vincent	Liberal	Western Australia	1956	1950–1964
Robert Wardlaw	Liberal	Tasmania	1956	1953–1962
Dame Ivy Wedgwood	Liberal	Victoria	1953	1950–1971
Don Willesee	Labor	Western Australia	1956	1950–1975
Ian Wood	Liberal	Queensland	1953	1950–1978
Robert Wordsworth	Liberal	Tasmania	1953	1950–1959
Reg Wright	Liberal	Tasmania	1956	1950–1978
