= Candidates of the 1955 Australian federal election =

This article provides information on candidates who stood for the 1955 Australian federal election. The election was held on 10 December 1955.

== By-elections, appointments and defections ==
=== By-elections and appointments ===
- On 21 May 1955, Jim Cope (Labor) was elected to replace Tom Sheehan (Labor) as the member for Cook.
- On 11 October 1955, Nancy Buttfield (Liberal) was appointed a South Australian Senator to replace George McLeay (Liberal).

=== Defections ===
- In 1955, the Australian Labor Party split, with the right-wing Catholic faction forming the Australian Labor Party (Anti-Communist). This latter group included Victorian Labor MPs Tom Andrews (Darebin), Bill Bourke (Fawkner), Bill Bryson (Wills), Jack Cremean (Hoddle), Bob Joshua (Ballaarat), Stan Keon (Yarra) and Jack Mullens (Gellibrand), together with Tasmanian Labor Senator George Cole.
- In 1955, Liberal Senator Agnes Robertson (Western Australia) lost preselection and defected to the Country Party.

== Redistributions and seat changes ==
- Redistributions of electoral boundaries occurred in all states.
  - In New South Wales, the Labor-held seats of Cook and Martin were abolished, and the notionally Labor seat of Hughes was created. The Country-held seat of Lawson became notionally Labor.
    - The member for Cook, Jim Cope (Labor), contested Watson.
    - The member for Martin, William O'Connor (Labor), contested Dalley.
    - The member for Watson, Dan Curtin (Labor), contested Kingsford-Smith.
  - In Victoria, the Labor-held seats of Burke and Hoddle were abolished, and the notionally Liberal seat of Bruce and the notionally Labor seat of Scullin were created. The Liberal-held seat of Corio became notionally Labor, while the Labor-held seats of Fawkner and Wannon became notionally Liberal.
    - The member for Burke, Edward Peters (Labor), contested Scullin.
    - The member for Gellibrand, Jack Mullens (Anti-Communist), contested Melbourne.
    - The member for Hoddle, Jack Cremean (Anti-Communist), contested Scullin.
  - The changes in Queensland did not result in any changes of party status.
  - In Western Australia, the notionally Labor seat of Stirling was created. The Labor-held seat of Swan became notionally Liberal.
    - The member for Swan, Harry Webb (Labor), contested Stirling.
  - In South Australia, the notionally Labor seat of Bonython was created. The Labor-held seat of Sturt became notionally Liberal.
    - The member for Sturt, Norman Makin (Labor), contested Bonython.
  - In Tasmania, the Liberal-held seat of Darwin was renamed Braddon.
    - The member for Darwin, Aubrey Luck (Liberal), contested Braddon.

== Retiring Members and Senators ==
=== Labor ===
- Gordon Anderson MP (Kingsford-Smith, NSW)
- Arthur Greenup MP (Dalley, NSW)
- Don McLeod MP (Wannon, Vic)

=== Liberal ===
- Josiah Francis MP (Moreton, Qld)
- Jo Gullett MP (Henty, Vic)

=== Country ===
- Senator George Rankin (Vic)

== House of Representatives ==
Sitting members at the time of the election are shown in bold text. Successful candidates are highlighted in the relevant colour. Where there is possible confusion, an asterisk (*) is also used.

=== Australian Capital Territory ===
Electorate	Held by	Labor candidate	Liberal candidate
Australian Capital Territory	Labor	**Jim Fraser**	Robert Greenish

=== New South Wales ===
Electorate	Held by	Labor candidate	Coalition candidate	Other candidates
Banks	Labor	**Eric Costa**	Harold Stalker (Lib)	Pat Clancy (CPA)
Barton	Labor	**H. V. Evatt**	Bill Arthur (Lib)	Eric Trembath (Ind)
Bennelong	Liberal	Harold Coates	**John Cramer** (Lib)	
Blaxland	Labor	**Eli Harrison**	Reginald Allsop (Lib)	
Bradfield	Liberal		**Harry Turner** (Lib)	
Calare	Liberal	Lionel Wood	**John Howse** (Lib)	
Cowper	Country		**Sir Earle Page** (CP)	
Cunningham	Labor	**Billy Davies**	John Parkinson (Lib)	William Harkness (CPA)
Dalley	Labor	**William O'Connor**	Stanley Tyler (Lib)	Ernie Thornton (CPA)
Darling	Labor	**Joe Clark**	Ewen Martin (CP)	
East Sydney	Labor	**Eddie Ward**	Joseph Landor (Lib)	Bill Brown (CPA)
Eden-Monaro	Labor	**Allan Fraser**	Mark Flanagan (Lib)	Royce Beavis (Ind)
Evans	Liberal	Sidney Pollard	**Frederick Osborne** (Lib)	
Farrer	Liberal	Robert Garland	**David Fairbairn** (Lib)	
Grayndler	Labor	**Fred Daly**	Ian Chisholm (Lib)	Hal Alexander (CPA); William McCristal (Ind)
Gwydir	Country	Austin Heffernan	**Ian Allan** (CP)	
Hughes	Labor	Les Johnson	Keith Bates (Lib)	Robert Mackie (Ind); Alf Watt (CPA)
Hume	Labor	**Arthur Fuller**	Charles Anderson (CP)	
Hunter	Labor	**Rowley James**	Edward Farrell (Lib)	Evan Phillips (CPA)
Kingsford-Smith	Labor	**Dan Curtin**	John McGirr (Lib)	Hubert O'Connell (Ind)
Lang	Labor	**Frank Stewart**	Wallace Peacock (Lib)	
Lawson	Labor	Jack Williamson	**Laurie Failes** (CP)	
Lowe	Liberal	Edward Davies	**William McMahon** (Lib)	
Lyne	Country	Jack Collins	**Philip Lucock** (CP)	Joe Cordner (Ind)
Macarthur	Liberal	Claude Allen	**Jeff Bate** (Lib)	
Mackellar	Liberal	Norman McAlpine	**Bill Wentworth** (Lib)	Frank Hardy (CPA)
Macquarie	Labor	**Tony Luchetti**	Norman Leven (Lib)	Vernon Moffitt (CPA)
Mitchell	Liberal	Doug Bowd	**Roy Wheeler** (Lib)	
New England	Country	Frederick Cowley	**David Drummond** (CP)	
Newcastle	Labor	**David Watkins**	Eric Cupit (Lib)	Sidney Monroe (Ind); Doug Olive (CPA)
North Sydney	Liberal	Joseph McNally	**William Jack** (Lib)	
Parkes	Labor	**Les Haylen**	John Spicer (Lib)	
Parramatta	Liberal	John Heazlewood	**Howard Beale** (Lib)	
Paterson	Liberal	William Harvey	**Allen Fairhall** (Lib)	
Phillip	Labor	**Joe Fitzgerald**	William Aston (Lib)	
Reid	Labor	**Charles Morgan**	George Walker (Lib)	Jack Hughes (CPA); Charles Tubman (Ind)
Richmond	Country		**Larry Anthony** (CP)	
Riverina	Country	Oscar Washington	**Hugh Roberton** (CP)	
Robertson	Liberal	Frank Spencer	**Roger Dean** (Lib)	
St George	Labor	**Nelson Lemmon**	Bill Graham (Lib)	
Shortland	Labor	**Charles Griffiths**	Gordon Greig (Lib)	
Warringah	Liberal		**Francis Bland** (Lib)	
Watson	Labor	**Jim Cope**	Jill Huxtable (Lib)	Harry Hatfield (CPA)
Wentworth	Liberal		**Sir Eric Harrison** (Lib)	Hal Lashwood (Ind)
Werriwa	Labor	**Gough Whitlam**	John Shannon (Lib)	
West Sydney	Labor	**Dan Minogue**	Frank Weaver (Lib)	Lance Sharkey (CPA)

=== Northern Territory ===
Electorate	Held by	Labor candidate
Northern Territory	Labor	**Jock Nelson**

=== Queensland ===
Electorate	Held by	Labor candidate	Coalition candidate	Other candidates
Bowman	Liberal	Hector Chalmers	**Malcolm McColm** (Lib)	
Brisbane	Labor	**George Lawson**	Kevin Cairns (Lib)	Claude Jones (CPA)
Capricornia	Liberal	Colin Maxwell	**George Pearce** (Lib)	Eric Browne (CPA)
Darling Downs	Liberal		**Reginald Swartz** (Lib)	
Dawson	Country	Stanley Dalton	**Charles Davidson** (CP)	
Fisher	Country		**Charles Adermann** (CP)	
Griffith	Labor	**Wilfred Coutts**	Doug Berry (Lib)	
Herbert	Labor	**Bill Edmonds**	Arnold White (CP)	Frank Bishop (CPA)
Kennedy	Labor	**Bill Riordan**	Timothy Donnelly (CP)	
Leichhardt	Labor	**Harry Bruce**	Tom Gilmore (CP)	Frank Falls (CPA)
Lilley	Liberal	Jack Melloy	**Bruce Wight** (Lib)	
Maranoa	Country		**Wilfred Brimblecombe** (CP)	Paul Bauers (Ind); Charles Russell (Ind)
McPherson	Country	David Clarke	**Sir Arthur Fadden** (CP)	Thomas Green (Ind)
Moreton	Liberal	Allen Edwards	James Killen (Lib)	Max Julius (CPA)
Oxley	Liberal	Norman Thomas	**Donald Cameron** (Lib)	James Dwyer (Ind); Mervyn Welsby (CPA)
Petrie	Liberal	Noel Curran	**Alan Hulme** (Lib)	
Ryan	Liberal	Norman Buchan	**Nigel Drury** (Lib)	
Wide Bay	Country	Matthew Tallon	**William Brand** (CP)	

=== South Australia ===
Electorate	Held by	Labor candidate	Liberal candidate	Other candidates
Adelaide	Labor	**Cyril Chambers**	James Maitland	Olaf Alland (ALPAC); Jim Moss (CPA)
Angas	Liberal	Darcy Nielsen	**Alick Downer**	Frank Rieck (Ind)
Barker	Liberal	Ralph Dettman	**Archie Cameron**	
Bonython	Labor	**Norman Makin**	John Mathwin	
Boothby	Liberal	Rex Mathews	**John McLeay**	John Sutherland (ALPAC)
Grey	Labor	**Edgar Russell**	George Bockelberg	
Hindmarsh	Labor	**Clyde Cameron**	Frank Potter	Francis Moran (ALPAC)
Kingston	Labor	**Pat Galvin**	Jim Forbes	
Port Adelaide	Labor	**Albert Thompson**		Peter Symon (CPA)
Sturt	Liberal	Frederick Hansford	Keith Wilson	
Wakefield	Liberal	Robert Bruce	**Sir Philip McBride**	Hector Henstridge (Ind)

=== Tasmania ===
Electorate	Held by	Labor candidate	Liberal candidate	Other candidates
Bass	Labor	**Lance Barnard**	Frederick White	Leslie Duke (ALPAC)
Braddon	Liberal	Reg Murray	**Aubrey Luck**	
Denison	Liberal	Brian Miller	**Athol Townley**	Max Bound (CPA)
Franklin	Liberal	Brian Crawford	**Bill Falkinder**	Henry Roberts (ALPAC)
Wilmot	Labor	**Gil Duthie**	Robert Bethell	Owen Doherty (ALPAC)

=== Victoria ===
Electorate	Held by	Labor candidate	Coalition candidate	Anti-Communist candidate	Communist candidate
Balaclava	Liberal	George Smith	**Percy Joske** (Lib)	Rex Keane	
Ballaarat	Labor	Austin Dowling	Dudley Erwin (Lib)	**Bob Joshua**	
Batman	Labor	**Alan Bird**	Fred Capp (Lib)	Tom Walsh	
Bendigo	Labor	**Percy Clarey**	Bill Day (Lib)	Jim Brosnan	
Bruce	Liberal	Keith Ewert	Billy Snedden (Lib)	Reginald Kearney	
Chisholm	Liberal	John Stewart	**Wilfrid Kent Hughes** (Lib)	Leonora Lloyd	
Corangamite	Liberal	Edwin Morris	**Dan Mackinnon** (Lib)	Leo O'Brien	
Corio	Labor	Charles Loader	**Hubert Opperman** (Lib)	Francis Singleton	
Darebin	Labor	Robert Holt	Charles White (Lib)	**Tom Andrews**	
Deakin	Liberal	Norm Griffiths	**Frank Davis** (Lib)	Terence Collins	
Fawkner	Labor	Patrick Thompson	Peter Howson (Lib)	**Bill Bourke**	
Flinders	Liberal	Francis Cranston	**Robert Lindsay** (Lib)	Jack Austin	
Gellibrand	Labor	Hector McIvor	John Bown (Lib)	James Eudey	Frank Johnson
Gippsland	Country	Clement Little	**George Bowden** (CP)	Frank Burns	
Henty	Liberal	Percy Treyvaud	Max Fox (Lib)	Henry Moore	
Higgins	Liberal	Andrew Hughes	**Harold Holt** (Lib)	John Fitzgerald	
Higinbotham	Liberal	Les Coates	**Frank Timson** (Lib)	Frank Gaffy	
Indi	Liberal	Carl Reeves	**William Bostock** (Lib)	William Findlay	
Isaacs	Liberal	Barry Jones	**William Haworth** (Lib)	John Hughes	
Kooyong	Liberal	Dolph Eddy	**Robert Menzies** (Lib)	Kevin Gregson	Gerry O'Day
La Trobe	Liberal	Bill Webber	**Richard Casey** (Lib)	George Noone	
Lalor	Labor	**Reg Pollard**	Peter Kemp (Lib)	William Lloyd	
Mallee	Country	William Nicholas	**Winton Turnbull** (CP)	Edwin Leyden	
Maribyrnong	Labor	**Arthur Drakeford**	Philip Stokes (Lib)	David Purcell	
McMillan	Liberal	Horace Hawkins	Alex Buchanan (Lib)	Desmond Devlin	
Melbourne	Labor	**Arthur Calwell**	James Moloney (Lib)	**Jack Mullens**	
Melbourne Ports	Labor	**Frank Crean**	Harold Sher (Lib)	Stan Corrigan	Alex Dobbin
Murray	Country	James Cameron	**John McEwen** (CP)	Michael Reilly	
Scullin	Labor	**Ted Peters**	Phillip Lynch (Lib)	**Jack Cremean**	
Wannon	Liberal	Roy Cundy	Malcolm Fraser (Lib)	Terence Callander	
Wills	Labor	Gordon Bryant	Alfred Wall (Lib)	**Bill Bryson**	
Wimmera	Liberal	Winston Lamb	**William Lawrence** (Lib)	Bernard Flanagan	
Yarra	Labor	Jim Cairns	James Wilkie (Lib)	**Stan Keon**	Ken Miller

=== Western Australia ===
Electorate	Held by	Labor candidate	Coalition candidate	Other candidates
Canning	Country		**Len Hamilton** (CP)	
Curtin	Liberal		**Paul Hasluck** (Lib)	
Forrest	Liberal		**Gordon Freeth** (Lib)	
Fremantle	Labor	**Kim Beazley**	Vernon Hubbard (Lib)	Paddy Troy (CPA)
Kalgoorlie	Labor	**Herbert Johnson**		Harold Illingworth (Ind)
Moore	Country		**Hugh Leslie** (CP)	
Perth	Labor	**Tom Burke**	Fred Chaney (Lib)	
Stirling	Labor	**Harry Webb**	Frederick Payne (Lib)	
Swan	Liberal	Thomas Williams	Richard Cleaver (Lib)	

== Senate ==
Sitting Senators are shown in bold text. Tickets that elected at least one Senator are highlighted in the relevant colour. Successful candidates are identified by an asterisk (*).

=== New South Wales ===
Five seats were up for election. The Labor Party was defending two seats. The Liberal-Country Coalition was defending three seats. Senators Stan Amour (Labor), Ken Anderson (Liberal), James Arnold (Labor), Donald Grant (Labor) and Alister McMullin (Liberal) were not up for re-election.

Labor candidates	Coalition candidates	Communist candidates	Ungrouped candidates
1. **Bill Ashley***; 2. **John Armstrong***; 3. Lindsay North	1. **Bill Spooner*** (Lib); 2. **Albert Reid*** (CP); 3. **John McCallum*** (Lib)	1. Jim Healy; 2. Cecil Connors; 3. Flo Davis	Donald Skelton; Stanley Allen; Harry Sawkins; Wal Campbell; Vincent Scott

=== Queensland ===
Five seats were up for election. The Labor Party was defending two seats. The Liberal-Country Coalition was defending three seats. Senators Gordon Brown (Labor), Condon Byrne (Labor), Roy Kendall (Liberal), Ted Maher (Country) and Ian Wood (Liberal) were not up for re-election.

Labor candidates	Coalition candidates	Communist candidates
1. **Archie Benn***; 2. **Ben Courtice***; 3. Edward Ashmore	1. **Walter Cooper*** (CP); 2. **Neil O'Sullivan*** (Lib); 3. **Annabelle Rankin*** (Lib)	1. Tom Millar; 2. Warren Bowden; 3. Albert Robinson

=== South Australia ===
Five seats were up for election. The Labor Party was defending two seats. The Liberal Party was defending three seats. Senators Jack Critchley (Labor), Keith Laught (Liberal), Rex Pearson (Liberal), John Ryan (Labor) and Jim Toohey (Labor) were not up for re-election.

Labor candidates	Liberal candidates	Anti-Communist candidates	Communist candidates
1. **Sid O'Flaherty***; 2. **Theo Nicholls***; 3. Joe Sexton	1. **Ted Mattner***; 2. **Clive Hannaford***; 3. **Nancy Buttfield***	1. Francis Boylan; 2. Daniel Smith; 3. Norman Vowles	1. Alan Finger; 2. Edward Robertson; 3. James Doyle

=== Tasmania ===
Five seats were up for election. The Labor Party was defending one seat. The Liberal Party was defending four seats. Senators Bill Aylett (Labor), George Cole (Labor), John Marriott (Liberal), Justin O'Byrne (Labor) and Robert Wordsworth (Liberal) were not up for re-election.

Labor candidates	Liberal candidates	Anti-Communist candidates	Ungrouped candidates
1. **Nick McKenna***; 2. Bob Poke*; 3. Bert Lacey	1. **Denham Henty***; 2. **Reg Wright***; 3. **Allan Guy**; 4. Arthur Smith; 5. **Robert Wardlaw***	1. Virgil Morgan; 2. Edward Vickers; 3. Lawrence O'Keeffe	Bill Wedd

=== Victoria ===
Five seats were up for election. The Labor Party was defending three seats. The Liberal-Country Coalition was defending two seats. Senators Jack Devlin (Labor), John Gorton (Liberal), Bert Hendrickson (Labor), Pat Kennelly (Labor) and Ivy Wedgwood (Liberal) were not up for re-election.

Labor candidates	Coalition candidates	Anti-Communist candidates	Communist candidates	HGJP candidates	Ungrouped candidates
1. **Don Cameron***; 2. **Jim Sheehan***; 3. **Charles Sandford**	1. **John Spicer*** (Lib); 2. Harrie Wade* (CP); 3. Magnus Cormack (Lib)	1. Frank McManus*; 2. John Cameron; 3. Thomas Carter	1. Ralph Gibson; 2. Laurence Troy; 3. Agnes Doig	1. Leslie Bawden; 2. William Pitt	John Dunstan

=== Western Australia ===
Five seats were up for election. The Labor Party was defending two seats. The Liberal Party was defending three seats (although Senator Agnes Robertson had defected to the Country Party). Senators Joe Cooke (Labor), James Fraser (Labor), John Harris (Labor), Malcolm Scott (Liberal) and Harrie Seward (Country) were not up for re-election.

Labor candidates	Liberal candidates	Country candidates	Anti-Communist candidates	Communist candidates
1. **Dorothy Tangney***; 2. **Don Willesee***; 3. Charlie Golding	1. **Shane Paltridge***; 2. **Seddon Vincent***; 3. George Branson	1. **Agnes Robertson***; 2. Reginald Davies	1. Ian Handcock; 2. Olive Anstey	1. John Gandini; 2. Annette Aarons; 3. Jack Marks
PEP candidates	Ungrouped candidates			
1. Claude Swaine; 2. Robert Salter	Carlyle Ferguson (APA)			

== Summary by party ==
Beside each party is the number of seats contested by that party in the House of Representatives for each state, as well as an indication of whether the party contested Senate elections in each state.

Party	NSW		Vic		Qld		WA		SA		Tas		ACT	NT	Total	
Party	HR	S	HR	S	HR	S	HR	S	HR	S	HR	S	HR	HR	HR	S
Australian Labor Party	42	*	33	*	15	*	5	*	11	*	5	*	1	1	113	6
Liberal Party of Australia	38	*	30	*	10	*	6	*	10	*	5	*	1		100	6
Australian Country Party	9	*	3	*	8	*	2	*							22	4
Australian Labor Party (Anti-Communist)			33	*				*	3	*	3	*			39	4
Communist Party of Australia	14	*	4	*	6	*	1	*	2	*	1				28	5
Henry George Justice Party				*												1
Progress Enterprise Party								*								1
All Parties Administration								*								1
Independent and other	8				1		1		2						12	

== See also ==
- 1955 Australian federal election
- Members of the Australian House of Representatives, 1954–1955
- Members of the Australian House of Representatives, 1955–1958
- Members of the Australian Senate, 1953–1956
- Members of the Australian Senate, 1956–1959
- List of political parties in Australia
