= List of senators from Tasmania =

Tasmania Australian Senate
- Created: 1901
- Party: Labor (5); Liberal (4); Greens (2); Lambie (1)

This is a list of senators from the state of Tasmania since the Federation of Australia in 1901.

== List ==
Senate	Election	Senator (Party)	Senator (Party)	Senator (Party)	Senator (Party)	Senator (Party)	Senator (Party)	Senator (Party)	Senator (Party)	Senator (Party)	Senator (Party)	Senator (Party)	Senator (Party)
1901–1903	1901	Cyril Cameron (Protectionist)	David O'Keefe (Labor)	Henry Dobson (Free Trade/ Revenue Tariff/ Anti-Socialist/ Liberal)	James Macfarlane (Free Trade/ Liberal)	John Clemons (Free Trade/ Liberal)	John Keating (Protectionist/ Liberal/ Nationalist)	6 senators per state 1901-1950					
1904–1906	1903	Edward Mulcahy (Protectionist/ Liberal)	David O'Keefe (Labor)	Henry Dobson (Free Trade/ Revenue Tariff/ Anti-Socialist/ Liberal)	James Macfarlane (Free Trade/ Liberal)	John Clemons (Free Trade/ Liberal)	John Keating (Protectionist/ Liberal/ Nationalist)	6 senators per state 1901-1950					
1904–1906	1906	Edward Mulcahy (Protectionist/ Liberal)	David O'Keefe (Labor)	Henry Dobson (Free Trade/ Revenue Tariff/ Anti-Socialist/ Liberal)	James Macfarlane (Free Trade/ Liberal)	John Clemons (Free Trade/ Liberal)	John Keating (Protectionist/ Liberal/ Nationalist)	6 senators per state 1901-1950					
1907–1910	1906	Edward Mulcahy (Protectionist/ Liberal)	Cyril Cameron (Anti-Socialist/ Liberal)	Henry Dobson (Free Trade/ Revenue Tariff/ Anti-Socialist/ Liberal)	James Macfarlane (Free Trade/ Liberal)	John Clemons (Free Trade/ Liberal)	John Keating (Protectionist/ Liberal/ Nationalist)	6 senators per state 1901-1950					
1907–1910	1909	Edward Mulcahy (Protectionist/ Liberal)	Cyril Cameron (Anti-Socialist/ Liberal)	Henry Dobson (Free Trade/ Revenue Tariff/ Anti-Socialist/ Liberal)	James Macfarlane (Free Trade/ Liberal)	John Clemons (Free Trade/ Liberal)	John Keating (Protectionist/ Liberal/ Nationalist)	6 senators per state 1901-1950					
1910–1913	1910	David O'Keefe (Labor)	Cyril Cameron (Anti-Socialist/ Liberal)	James Long (Labor)	Rudolph Ready (Labor)	John Clemons (Free Trade/ Liberal)	John Keating (Protectionist/ Liberal/ Nationalist)	6 senators per state 1901-1950					
1913–1914	1913	David O'Keefe (Labor)	Thomas Bakhap (Liberal/ Nationalist)	James Long (Labor)	Rudolph Ready (Labor)	John Clemons (Free Trade/ Liberal)	John Keating (Protectionist/ Liberal/ Nationalist)	6 senators per state 1901-1950					
1914–1917	1914	David O'Keefe (Labor)	Thomas Bakhap (Liberal/ Nationalist)	James Long (Labor)	Rudolph Ready (Labor)	James Guy (Labor)	John Keating (Protectionist/ Liberal/ Nationalist)	6 senators per state 1901-1950					
1914–1917	1917	David O'Keefe (Labor)	Thomas Bakhap (Liberal/ Nationalist)	James Long (Labor)	John Earle (Nationalist)	James Guy (Labor)	John Keating (Protectionist/ Liberal/ Nationalist)	6 senators per state 1901-1950					
1917–1920	1917	David O'Keefe (Labor)	Thomas Bakhap (Liberal/ Nationalist)	James Long (Labor)	John Earle (Nationalist)	James Guy (Labor)	John Keating (Protectionist/ Liberal/ Nationalist)	6 senators per state 1901-1950					
1917–1920	1919	David O'Keefe (Labor)	Thomas Bakhap (Liberal/ Nationalist)	Edward Mulcahy (Nationalist)	John Earle (Nationalist)	James Guy (Labor)	John Keating (Protectionist/ Liberal/ Nationalist)	6 senators per state 1901-1950					
1920–1923	1919	George Foster (Nationalist)	Thomas Bakhap (Liberal/ Nationalist)	Herbert Payne (Nationalist/ UAP)	John Earle (Nationalist)	John Millen (Nationalist/ UAP)	John Keating (Protectionist/ Liberal/ Nationalist)	6 senators per state 1901-1950					
1923–1926	1922	George Foster (Nationalist)	Thomas Bakhap (Liberal/ Nationalist)	Herbert Payne (Nationalist/ UAP)	James Ogden (Labor/ Independent/ Nationalist/ UAP)	John Millen (Nationalist/ UAP)	Herbert Hays (Nationalist/ UAP/ Liberal)	6 senators per state 1901-1950					
1923–1926	1923	George Foster (Nationalist)	John Hayes (Nationalist/ UAP/ Liberal)	Herbert Payne (Nationalist/ UAP)	James Ogden (Labor/ Independent/ Nationalist/ UAP)	John Millen (Nationalist/ UAP)	Herbert Hays (Nationalist/ UAP/ Liberal)	6 senators per state 1901-1950					
1923–1926	July 1925	Charles Grant (Nationalist)	John Hayes (Nationalist/ UAP/ Liberal)	Herbert Payne (Nationalist/ UAP)	James Ogden (Labor/ Independent/ Nationalist/ UAP)	John Millen (Nationalist/ UAP)	Herbert Hays (Nationalist/ UAP/ Liberal)	6 senators per state 1901-1950					
1923–1926	Nov 1925	Burford Sampson (Nationalist/ UAP)	John Hayes (Nationalist/ UAP/ Liberal)	Herbert Payne (Nationalist/ UAP)	James Ogden (Labor/ Independent/ Nationalist/ UAP)	John Millen (Nationalist/ UAP)	Herbert Hays (Nationalist/ UAP/ Liberal)	6 senators per state 1901-1950					
1923–1926	1926	Burford Sampson (Nationalist/ UAP)	John Hayes (Nationalist/ UAP/ Liberal)	Herbert Payne (Nationalist/ UAP)	James Ogden (Labor/ Independent/ Nationalist/ UAP)	John Millen (Nationalist/ UAP)	Herbert Hays (Nationalist/ UAP/ Liberal)	6 senators per state 1901-1950					
1926–1929	1925	Burford Sampson (Nationalist/ UAP)	John Hayes (Nationalist/ UAP/ Liberal)	Herbert Payne (Nationalist/ UAP)	James Ogden (Labor/ Independent/ Nationalist/ UAP)	John Millen (Nationalist/ UAP)	Herbert Hays (Nationalist/ UAP/ Liberal)	6 senators per state 1901-1950					
1926–1929	1928	Burford Sampson (Nationalist/ UAP)	John Hayes (Nationalist/ UAP/ Liberal)	Herbert Payne (Nationalist/ UAP)	James Ogden (Labor/ Independent/ Nationalist/ UAP)	John Millen (Nationalist/ UAP)	Herbert Hays (Nationalist/ UAP/ Liberal)	6 senators per state 1901-1950					
1929–1932	1928	Burford Sampson (Nationalist/ UAP)	John Hayes (Nationalist/ UAP/ Liberal)	Herbert Payne (Nationalist/ UAP)	James Ogden (Labor/ Independent/ Nationalist/ UAP)	John Millen (Nationalist/ UAP)	Herbert Hays (Nationalist/ UAP/ Liberal)	6 senators per state 1901-1950					
1929–1932	1931	Burford Sampson (Nationalist/ UAP)	John Hayes (Nationalist/ UAP/ Liberal)	Herbert Payne (Nationalist/ UAP)	James Ogden (Labor/ Independent/ Nationalist/ UAP)	John Millen (Nationalist/ UAP)	Herbert Hays (Nationalist/ UAP/ Liberal)	6 senators per state 1901-1950					
1929–1932	1932	Burford Sampson (Nationalist/ UAP)	John Hayes (Nationalist/ UAP/ Liberal)	Herbert Payne (Nationalist/ UAP)	Charles Grant (UAP)	John Millen (Nationalist/ UAP)	Herbert Hays (Nationalist/ UAP/ Liberal)	6 senators per state 1901-1950					
1932–1935	1931	Burford Sampson (Nationalist/ UAP)	John Hayes (Nationalist/ UAP/ Liberal)	Herbert Payne (Nationalist/ UAP)	Charles Grant (UAP)	John Millen (Nationalist/ UAP)	Herbert Hays (Nationalist/ UAP/ Liberal)	6 senators per state 1901-1950					
1935–1938	1934	Burford Sampson (Nationalist/ UAP)	John Hayes (Nationalist/ UAP/ Liberal)	Herbert Payne (Nationalist/ UAP)	Charles Grant (UAP)	John Millen (Nationalist/ UAP)	Herbert Hays (Nationalist/ UAP/ Liberal)	6 senators per state 1901-1950					
1938–1941	1937	Bill Aylett (Labor)	John Hayes (Nationalist/ UAP/ Liberal)	Charles Lamp (Labor)	Charles Grant (UAP)	Richard Darcey (Labor)	Herbert Hays (Nationalist/ UAP/ Liberal)	6 senators per state 1901-1950					
1941–1944	1940	Bill Aylett (Labor)	John Hayes (Nationalist/ UAP/ Liberal)	Charles Lamp (Labor)	Burford Sampson (UAP/ Liberal)	Richard Darcey (Labor)	Herbert Hays (Nationalist/ UAP/ Liberal)	6 senators per state 1901-1950					
1944–1947	1943	Bill Aylett (Labor)	John Hayes (Nationalist/ UAP/ Liberal)	Charles Lamp (Labor)	Burford Sampson (UAP/ Liberal)	Nick McKenna (Labor)	Herbert Hays (Nationalist/ UAP/ Liberal)	6 senators per state 1901-1950					
1944–1947	1945	Bill Aylett (Labor)	John Hayes (Nationalist/ UAP/ Liberal)	Charles Lamp (Labor)	Burford Sampson (UAP/ Liberal)	Nick McKenna (Labor)	Herbert Hays (Nationalist/ UAP/ Liberal)	6 senators per state 1901-1950					
1947–1950	1946	Bill Aylett (Labor)	Bill Morrow (Labor)	Charles Lamp (Labor)	Justin O'Byrne (Labor)	Nick McKenna (Labor)	Reg Murray (Labor)	6 senators per state 1901-1950					
1947–1950	1950	Bill Aylett (Labor)	Bill Morrow (Labor)	Charles Lamp (Labor)	Justin O'Byrne (Labor)	Nick McKenna (Labor)	Reg Murray (Labor)	George Cole (Labor/ DLP)	Allan Guy (Liberal)	Reg Wright (Liberal)	Robert Wordsworth (Liberal)	10 senators per state 1950-1984	
1950–1951	1949	Bill Aylett (Labor)	Bill Morrow (Labor)	Denham Henty (Liberal)	Justin O'Byrne (Labor)	Nick McKenna (Labor)	Reg Murray (Labor)	George Cole (Labor/ DLP)	Allan Guy (Liberal)	Reg Wright (Liberal)	Robert Wordsworth (Liberal)	10 senators per state 1950-1984	
1951–1953	1951	Bill Aylett (Labor)	Bill Morrow (Labor)	Denham Henty (Liberal)	Justin O'Byrne (Labor)	Nick McKenna (Labor)	Jack Chamberlain (Liberal)	George Cole (Labor/ DLP)	Allan Guy (Liberal)	Reg Wright (Liberal)	Robert Wordsworth (Liberal)	10 senators per state 1950-1984	
1951–1953	March 1953	Bill Aylett (Labor)	Bill Morrow (Labor)	Denham Henty (Liberal)	Justin O'Byrne (Labor)	Nick McKenna (Labor)	John Marriott (Liberal)	George Cole (Labor/ DLP)	Allan Guy (Liberal)	Reg Wright (Liberal)	Robert Wordsworth (Liberal)	10 senators per state 1950-1984	
1951–1953	May 1953	Bill Aylett (Labor)	Bill Morrow (Labor)	Denham Henty (Liberal)	Justin O'Byrne (Labor)	Nick McKenna (Labor)	Robert Wardlaw (Liberal)	George Cole (Labor/ DLP)	Allan Guy (Liberal)	Reg Wright (Liberal)	Robert Wordsworth (Liberal)	10 senators per state 1950-1984	
1953–1956	1953	Bill Aylett (Labor)	John Marriott (Liberal)	Denham Henty (Liberal)	Justin O'Byrne (Labor)	Nick McKenna (Labor)	Robert Wardlaw (Liberal)	George Cole (Labor/ DLP)	Allan Guy (Liberal)	Reg Wright (Liberal)	Robert Wordsworth (Liberal)	10 senators per state 1950-1984	
1953–1956	1955	Bill Aylett (Labor)	John Marriott (Liberal)	Denham Henty (Liberal)	Justin O'Byrne (Labor)	Nick McKenna (Labor)	Robert Wardlaw (Liberal)	George Cole (Labor/ DLP)	Allan Guy (Liberal)	Reg Wright (Liberal)	Robert Wordsworth (Liberal)	10 senators per state 1950-1984	
1956–1959	1955	Bill Aylett (Labor)	John Marriott (Liberal)	Denham Henty (Liberal)	Justin O'Byrne (Labor)	Nick McKenna (Labor)	Robert Wardlaw (Liberal)	George Cole (Labor/ DLP)	Bob Poke (Labor)	Reg Wright (Liberal)	Robert Wordsworth (Liberal)	10 senators per state 1950-1984	
1959–1962	1958	Bill Aylett (Labor)	John Marriott (Liberal)	Denham Henty (Liberal)	Justin O'Byrne (Labor)	Nick McKenna (Labor)	Robert Wardlaw (Liberal)	George Cole (Labor/ DLP)	Bob Poke (Labor)	Reg Wright (Liberal)	Elliot Lillico (Liberal)	10 senators per state 1950-1984	
1962–1965	1961	Bill Aylett (Labor)	John Marriott (Liberal)	Denham Henty (Liberal)	Justin O'Byrne (Labor)	Nick McKenna (Labor)	Reg Turnbull (Independent)	George Cole (Labor/ DLP)	Bob Poke (Labor)	Reg Wright (Liberal)	Elliot Lillico (Liberal)	10 senators per state 1950-1984	
1965–1968	1964	Bert Lacey (Labor)	John Marriott (Liberal)	Denham Henty (Liberal)	Justin O'Byrne (Labor)	Nick McKenna (Labor)	Reg Turnbull (Independent)	Don Devitt (Labor)	Bob Poke (Labor)	Reg Wright (Liberal)	Elliot Lillico (Liberal)	10 senators per state 1950-1984	
1968–1971	1967	Bert Lacey (Labor)	John Marriott (Liberal)	Peter Rae (Liberal)	Justin O'Byrne (Labor)	Ken Wriedt (Labor)	Reg Turnbull (Independent)	Don Devitt (Labor)	Bob Poke (Labor)	Reg Wright (Liberal)	Elliot Lillico (Liberal)	10 senators per state 1950-1984	
1971–1974	1970	Michael Townley (Independent/ Liberal)	John Marriott (Liberal)	Peter Rae (Liberal)	Justin O'Byrne (Labor)	Ken Wriedt (Labor)	Reg Turnbull (Independent)	Don Devitt (Labor)	Bob Poke (Labor)	Reg Wright (Liberal)	Elliot Lillico (Liberal)	10 senators per state 1950-1984	
1974–1975	1974	Michael Townley (Independent/ Liberal)	John Marriott (Liberal)	Peter Rae (Liberal)	Justin O'Byrne (Labor)	Ken Wriedt (Labor)	Don Grimes (Labor)	Don Devitt (Labor)	Merv Everett (Labor)	Reg Wright (Liberal)	Eric Bessell (Liberal)	10 senators per state 1950-1984	
1974–1975	1975	Michael Townley (Independent/ Liberal)	John Marriott (Liberal)	Peter Rae (Liberal)	Justin O'Byrne (Labor)	Ken Wriedt (Labor)	Don Grimes (Labor)	Don Devitt (Labor)	Merv Everett (Labor)	Reg Wright (Liberal)	Eric Bessell (Liberal)	10 senators per state 1950-1984	
1975–1978	1975	Michael Townley (Independent/ Liberal)	Brian Archer (Liberal)	Peter Rae (Liberal)	Justin O'Byrne (Labor)	Ken Wriedt (Labor)	Don Grimes (Labor)	Don Devitt (Labor)	Brian Harradine (Independent)	Reg Wright (Liberal)	Shirley Walters (Liberal)	10 senators per state 1950-1984	
1978–1981	1977	Michael Townley (Independent/ Liberal)	Brian Archer (Liberal)	Peter Rae (Liberal)	Justin O'Byrne (Labor)	Ken Wriedt (Labor)	Don Grimes (Labor)	Michael Tate (Labor)	Brian Harradine (Independent)	John Watson (Liberal)	Shirley Walters (Liberal)	10 senators per state 1950-1984	
1978–1981	1980	Michael Townley (Independent/ Liberal)	Brian Archer (Liberal)	Peter Rae (Liberal)	Justin O'Byrne (Labor)	Jean Hearn (Labor)	Don Grimes (Labor)	Michael Tate (Labor)	Brian Harradine (Independent)	John Watson (Liberal)	Shirley Walters (Liberal)	10 senators per state 1950-1984	
1981–1983	1980	Michael Townley (Independent/ Liberal)	Brian Archer (Liberal)	Peter Rae (Liberal)	John Coates (Labor)	Jean Hearn (Labor)	Don Grimes (Labor)	Michael Tate (Labor)	Brian Harradine (Independent)	John Watson (Liberal)	Shirley Walters (Liberal)	10 senators per state 1950-1984	
1983–1985	1983	Michael Townley (Independent/ Liberal)	Brian Archer (Liberal)	Peter Rae (Liberal)	John Coates (Labor)	Jean Hearn (Labor)	Don Grimes (Labor)	Michael Tate (Labor)	Brian Harradine (Independent)	John Watson (Liberal)	Shirley Walters (Liberal)	10 senators per state 1950-1984	
1983–1985	1984	Michael Townley (Independent/ Liberal)	Brian Archer (Liberal)	Peter Rae (Liberal)	John Coates (Labor)	Jean Hearn (Labor)	Don Grimes (Labor)	Michael Tate (Labor)	Brian Harradine (Independent)	John Watson (Liberal)	Shirley Walters (Liberal)	Terry Aulich (Labor)	Ray Devlin (Labor)
1985–1987	1984	Michael Townley (Independent/ Liberal)	Brian Archer (Liberal)	Peter Rae (Liberal)	John Coates (Labor)	Norm Sanders (Democrat)	Don Grimes (Labor)	Michael Tate (Labor)	Brian Harradine (Independent)	John Watson (Liberal)	Shirley Walters (Liberal)	Terry Aulich (Labor)	Ray Devlin (Labor)
1985–1987	1986	Michael Townley (Independent/ Liberal)	Brian Archer (Liberal)	Jocelyn Newman (Liberal)	John Coates (Labor)	Norm Sanders (Democrat)	Don Grimes (Labor)	Michael Tate (Labor)	Brian Harradine (Independent)	John Watson (Liberal)	Shirley Walters (Liberal)	Terry Aulich (Labor)	Ray Devlin (Labor)
1987–1990	1987	Paul Calvert (Liberal)	Brian Archer (Liberal)	Jocelyn Newman (Liberal)	John Coates (Labor)	Norm Sanders (Democrat)	John Devereux (Labor/ Independent)	Michael Tate (Labor)	Brian Harradine (Independent)	John Watson (Liberal)	Shirley Walters (Liberal)	Terry Aulich (Labor)	Ray Devlin (Labor)
1987–1990	1990	Paul Calvert (Liberal)	Brian Archer (Liberal)	Jocelyn Newman (Liberal)	John Coates (Labor)	Robert Bell (Democrat)	John Devereux (Labor/ Independent)	Michael Tate (Labor)	Brian Harradine (Independent)	John Watson (Liberal)	Shirley Walters (Liberal)	Terry Aulich (Labor)	Ray Devlin (Labor)
1990–1993	1990	Paul Calvert (Liberal)	Brian Archer (Liberal)	Jocelyn Newman (Liberal)	John Coates (Labor)	Robert Bell (Democrat)	John Devereux (Labor/ Independent)	Michael Tate (Labor)	Brian Harradine (Independent)	John Watson (Liberal)	Shirley Walters (Liberal)	Terry Aulich (Labor)	Nick Sherry (Labor)
1993–1996	1993	Paul Calvert (Liberal)	Brian Archer (Liberal)	Jocelyn Newman (Liberal)	John Coates (Labor)	Robert Bell (Democrat)	John Devereux (Labor/ Independent)	Michael Tate (Labor)	Brian Harradine (Independent)	John Watson (Liberal)	Brian Gibson (Liberal)	Shayne Murphy (Labor/ Independent)	Nick Sherry (Labor)
1993–1996	1993	Paul Calvert (Liberal)	Brian Archer (Liberal)	Jocelyn Newman (Liberal)	John Coates (Labor)	Robert Bell (Democrat)	John Devereux (Labor/ Independent)	Kay Denman (Labor)	Brian Harradine (Independent)	John Watson (Liberal)	Brian Gibson (Liberal)	Shayne Murphy (Labor/ Independent)	Nick Sherry (Labor)
1993–1996	1994	Paul Calvert (Liberal)	Eric Abetz (Liberal)	Jocelyn Newman (Liberal)	John Coates (Labor)	Robert Bell (Democrat)	John Devereux (Labor/ Independent)	Kay Denman (Labor)	Brian Harradine (Independent)	John Watson (Liberal)	Brian Gibson (Liberal)	Shayne Murphy (Labor/ Independent)	Nick Sherry (Labor)
1993–1996	1996	Paul Calvert (Liberal)	Eric Abetz (Liberal)	Jocelyn Newman (Liberal)	John Coates (Labor)	Robert Bell (Democrat)	Sue Mackay (Labor)	Kay Denman (Labor)	Brian Harradine (Independent)	John Watson (Liberal)	Brian Gibson (Liberal)	Shayne Murphy (Labor/ Independent)	Nick Sherry (Labor)
1996–1999	1996	Paul Calvert (Liberal)	Eric Abetz (Liberal)	Jocelyn Newman (Liberal)	John Coates (Labor)	Bob Brown (Greens)	Sue Mackay (Labor)	Kay Denman (Labor)	Brian Harradine (Independent)	John Watson (Liberal)	Brian Gibson (Liberal)	Shayne Murphy (Labor/ Independent)	Nick Sherry (Labor)
1996–1999	1996	Paul Calvert (Liberal)	Eric Abetz (Liberal)	Jocelyn Newman (Liberal)	Kerry O'Brien (Labor)	Bob Brown (Greens)	Sue Mackay (Labor)	Kay Denman (Labor)	Brian Harradine (Independent)	John Watson (Liberal)	Brian Gibson (Liberal)	Shayne Murphy (Labor/ Independent)	Nick Sherry (Labor)
1999–2002	1998	Paul Calvert (Liberal)	Eric Abetz (Liberal)	Jocelyn Newman (Liberal)	Kerry O'Brien (Labor)	Bob Brown (Greens)	Sue Mackay (Labor)	Kay Denman (Labor)	Brian Harradine (Independent)	John Watson (Liberal)	Brian Gibson (Liberal)	Shayne Murphy (Labor/ Independent)	Nick Sherry (Labor)
1999–2002	2001	Paul Calvert (Liberal)	Eric Abetz (Liberal)	Jocelyn Newman (Liberal)	Kerry O'Brien (Labor)	Bob Brown (Greens)	Sue Mackay (Labor)	Kay Denman (Labor)	Brian Harradine (Independent)	John Watson (Liberal)	Brian Gibson (Liberal)	Shayne Murphy (Labor/ Independent)	Nick Sherry (Labor)
1999–2002	2002	Paul Calvert (Liberal)	Eric Abetz (Liberal)	Richard Colbeck (Liberal)	Kerry O'Brien (Labor)	Bob Brown (Greens)	Sue Mackay (Labor)	Kay Denman (Labor)	Brian Harradine (Independent)	John Watson (Liberal)	Guy Barnett (Liberal)	Shayne Murphy (Labor/ Independent)	Nick Sherry (Labor)
2002–2005	2001	Paul Calvert (Liberal)	Eric Abetz (Liberal)	Richard Colbeck (Liberal)	Kerry O'Brien (Labor)	Bob Brown (Greens)	Sue Mackay (Labor)	Kay Denman (Labor)	Brian Harradine (Independent)	John Watson (Liberal)	Guy Barnett (Liberal)	Shayne Murphy (Labor/ Independent)	Nick Sherry (Labor)
2005–2008	2004	Paul Calvert (Liberal)	Eric Abetz (Liberal)	Richard Colbeck (Liberal)	Kerry O'Brien (Labor)	Bob Brown (Greens)	Sue Mackay (Labor)	Helen Polley (Labor)	Christine Milne (Greens)	John Watson (Liberal)	Guy Barnett (Liberal)	Stephen Parry (Liberal)	Nick Sherry (Labor)
2005–2008	2005	Paul Calvert (Liberal)	Eric Abetz (Liberal)	Richard Colbeck (Liberal)	Kerry O'Brien (Labor)	Bob Brown (Greens)	Carol Brown (Labor)	Helen Polley (Labor)	Christine Milne (Greens)	John Watson (Liberal)	Guy Barnett (Liberal)	Stephen Parry (Liberal)	Nick Sherry (Labor)
2005–2008	2007	David Bushby (Liberal)	Eric Abetz (Liberal)	Richard Colbeck (Liberal)	Kerry O'Brien (Labor)	Bob Brown (Greens)	Carol Brown (Labor)	Helen Polley (Labor)	Christine Milne (Greens)	John Watson (Liberal)	Guy Barnett (Liberal)	Stephen Parry (Liberal)	Nick Sherry (Labor)
2008–2011	2007	David Bushby (Liberal)	Eric Abetz (Liberal)	Richard Colbeck (Liberal)	Kerry O'Brien (Labor)	Bob Brown (Greens)	Carol Brown (Labor)	Helen Polley (Labor)	Christine Milne (Greens)	Catryna Bilyk (Labor)	Guy Barnett (Liberal)	Stephen Parry (Liberal)	Nick Sherry (Labor)
2011–2014	2010	David Bushby (Liberal)	Eric Abetz (Liberal)	Richard Colbeck (Liberal)	Anne Urquhart (Labor)	Bob Brown (Greens)	Carol Brown (Labor)	Helen Polley (Labor)	Christine Milne (Greens)	Catryna Bilyk (Labor)	Lisa Singh (Labor)	Stephen Parry (Liberal)	Nick Sherry (Labor)
2011–2014	2012	David Bushby (Liberal)	Eric Abetz (Liberal)	Richard Colbeck (Liberal)	Anne Urquhart (Labor)	Peter Whish-Wilson (Greens)	Carol Brown (Labor)	Helen Polley (Labor)	Christine Milne (Greens)	Catryna Bilyk (Labor)	Lisa Singh (Labor)	Stephen Parry (Liberal)	Lin Thorp (Labor)
2014–2016	2013	David Bushby (Liberal)	Eric Abetz (Liberal)	Richard Colbeck (Liberal)	Anne Urquhart (Labor)	Peter Whish-Wilson (Greens)	Carol Brown (Labor)	Helen Polley (Labor)	Christine Milne (Greens)	Catryna Bilyk (Labor)	Lisa Singh (Labor)	Stephen Parry (Liberal)	Jacqui Lambie (Palmer United/ Independent/ JLN)
2014–2016	2014	David Bushby (Liberal)	Eric Abetz (Liberal)	Richard Colbeck (Liberal)	Anne Urquhart (Labor)	Peter Whish-Wilson (Greens)	Carol Brown (Labor)	Helen Polley (Labor)	Christine Milne (Greens)	Catryna Bilyk (Labor)	Lisa Singh (Labor)	Stephen Parry (Liberal)	Jacqui Lambie (Palmer United/ Independent/ JLN)
2014–2016	2015	David Bushby (Liberal)	Eric Abetz (Liberal)	Richard Colbeck (Liberal)	Anne Urquhart (Labor)	Peter Whish-Wilson (Greens)	Carol Brown (Labor)	Helen Polley (Labor)	Nick McKim (Greens)	Catryna Bilyk (Labor)	Lisa Singh (Labor)	Stephen Parry (Liberal)	Jacqui Lambie (Palmer United/ Independent/ JLN)
2016–2019	2016	David Bushby (Liberal)	Eric Abetz (Liberal)	Jonathon Duniam (Liberal)	Anne Urquhart (Labor)	Peter Whish-Wilson (Greens)	Carol Brown (Labor)	Helen Polley (Labor)	Nick McKim (Greens)	Catryna Bilyk (Labor)	Lisa Singh (Labor)	Stephen Parry (Liberal)	Jacqui Lambie (Palmer United/ Independent/ JLN)
2016–2019	Feb 2018	David Bushby (Liberal)	Eric Abetz (Liberal)	Jonathon Duniam (Liberal)	Anne Urquhart (Labor)	Peter Whish-Wilson (Greens)	Carol Brown (Labor)	Helen Polley (Labor)	Nick McKim (Greens)	Catryna Bilyk (Labor)	Lisa Singh (Labor)	Richard Colbeck (Liberal)	Steve Martin (Independent/ National)
2016–2019	May 2018	David Bushby (Liberal)	Eric Abetz (Liberal)	Jonathon Duniam (Liberal)	Anne Urquhart (Labor)	Peter Whish-Wilson (Greens)	Carol Brown (Labor)	Helen Polley (Labor)	Nick McKim (Greens)	Catryna Bilyk (Labor)	Lisa Singh (Labor)	Richard Colbeck (Liberal)	Steve Martin (Independent/ National)
2016–2019	2019	Wendy Askew (Liberal)	Eric Abetz (Liberal)	Jonathon Duniam (Liberal)	Anne Urquhart (Labor)	Peter Whish-Wilson (Greens)	Carol Brown (Labor)	Helen Polley (Labor)	Nick McKim (Greens)	Catryna Bilyk (Labor)	Lisa Singh (Labor)	Richard Colbeck (Liberal)	Steve Martin (Independent/ National)
2019–2022	2019	Wendy Askew (Liberal)	Eric Abetz (Liberal)	Jonathon Duniam (Liberal)	Anne Urquhart (Labor)	Peter Whish-Wilson (Greens)	Carol Brown (Labor)	Helen Polley (Labor)	Nick McKim (Greens)	Catryna Bilyk (Labor)	Claire Chandler (Liberal)	Richard Colbeck (Liberal)	Jacqui Lambie (JLN)
2022–2025	2022	Wendy Askew (Liberal)	Tammy Tyrrell (JLN/ Independent/ Labor)	Jonathon Duniam (Liberal)	Anne Urquhart (Labor)	Peter Whish-Wilson (Greens)	Carol Brown (Labor)	Helen Polley (Labor)	Nick McKim (Greens)	Catryna Bilyk (Labor)	Claire Chandler (Liberal)	Richard Colbeck (Liberal)	Jacqui Lambie (JLN)
2022–2025	2024	Wendy Askew (Liberal)	Tammy Tyrrell (JLN/ Independent/ Labor)	Jonathon Duniam (Liberal)	Anne Urquhart (Labor)	Peter Whish-Wilson (Greens)	Carol Brown (Labor)	Helen Polley (Labor)	Nick McKim (Greens)	Catryna Bilyk (Labor)	Claire Chandler (Liberal)	Richard Colbeck (Liberal)	Jacqui Lambie (JLN)
2022–2025	2025	Wendy Askew (Liberal)	Tammy Tyrrell (JLN/ Independent/ Labor)	Jonathon Duniam (Liberal)	Josh Dolega (Labor)	Peter Whish-Wilson (Greens)	Carol Brown (Labor)	Helen Polley (Labor)	Nick McKim (Greens)	Catryna Bilyk (Labor)	Claire Chandler (Liberal)	Richard Colbeck (Liberal)	Jacqui Lambie (JLN)
2025–2028	2025	Wendy Askew (Liberal)	Tammy Tyrrell (JLN/ Independent/ Labor)	Jonathon Duniam (Liberal)	Josh Dolega (Labor)	Peter Whish-Wilson (Greens)	Carol Brown (Labor)	Helen Polley (Labor)	Nick McKim (Greens)	Richard Dowling (Labor)	Claire Chandler (Liberal)	Richard Colbeck (Liberal)	Jacqui Lambie (JLN)
2025–2028	2026	Chris Gatenby (Liberal)	Tammy Tyrrell (JLN/ Independent/ Labor)	Jonathon Duniam (Liberal)	Josh Dolega (Labor)	Vanessa Bleyer (Greens)	Carol Brown (Labor)	Helen Polley (Labor)	Nick McKim (Greens)	Richard Dowling (Labor)	Claire Chandler (Liberal)	Richard Colbeck (Liberal)	Jacqui Lambie (JLN)

== See also ==
- Electoral results for the Australian Senate in Tasmania
