= Members of the Australian Senate, 1953–1956 =

Senate composition at 1 July 1953
Government (31) - (1 seat majority)
Liberal (26) (Note: Agnes Robertson left the Liberal Party in 1955, then after 21 days as an independent joined the Country Party.)
Country Party (5)

Opposition (29)
Labor (29) (Note: George Cole joined the Australian Labor Party (Anti-Communist) in 1955, which became the Democratic Labor Party in 1957.)

Changes in composition

This is a list of members of the Australian Senate from 1953 to 1956. Half of its members were elected at the 28 April 1951 election and had terms deemed to start on 1 July 1950 and finishing on 30 June 1956; the other half were elected at the 9 May 1953 election and had terms starting on 1 July 1953 and finishing on 30 June 1959.

| Senator | Party | State | Term ending | Years in office |
|---|---|---|---|---|
| Stan Amour | Labor | New South Wales | 1959 | 1938–1965 |
| Ken Anderson | Liberal | New South Wales | 1959 | 1953–1975 |
| John Armstrong | Labor | New South Wales | 1956 | 1938–1962 |
| James Arnold | Labor | New South Wales | 1959 | 1941–1965 |
| Bill Ashley | Labor | New South Wales | 1956 | 1938–1958 |
| Bill Aylett | Labor | Tasmania | 1959 | 1938–1965 |
| Archie Benn | Labor | Queensland | 1956 | 1950–1968 |
| Gordon Brown (Note: Father of the Senate) | Labor | Queensland | 1959 | 1932–1965 |
| Nancy Buttfield (Note: Liberal Senator George McLeay died on 14 September 1955; Liberal Party member Nancy Buttfield was appointed to fill the ensuing vacancy on 11 October.) | Liberal | South Australia | 1956 (Note: Appointed to a casual vacancy and only held office until the earlier of the next election for the House of Representatives or the Senate.) | 1955–1965, 1968–1974 |
| Condon Byrne | Labor | Queensland | 1959 | 1951–1959, 1968–1974 |
| Don Cameron | Labor | Victoria | 1956 | 1938–1962 |
| George Cole | Labor/ALP (A-C) (Note: As part of the 1955 Labor split, George Cole joined the Australian Labor Party (Anti-Communist), which became the Democratic Labor Party in 1957.) | Tasmania | 1959 | 1950–1965 |
| Joe Cooke | Labor | Western Australia | 1959 | 1947–1951, 1952–1965 |
| Walter Cooper | Country | Queensland | 1956 | 1928–1932, 1935–1968 |
| Ben Courtice | Labor | Queensland | 1956 | 1937–1962 |
| Jack Critchley | Labor | South Australia | 1959 | 1947–1959 |
| Jack Devlin | Labor | Victoria | 1959 | 1946–1957 |
| James Fraser | Labor | Western Australia | 1959 | 1938–1959 |
| John Gorton | Liberal | Victoria | 1956 | 1950–1968 |
| Donald Grant | Labor | New South Wales | 1959 | 1944–1959 |
| Allan Guy | Liberal | Tasmania | 1956 | 1950–1956 |
| Clive Hannaford | Liberal | South Australia | 1956 | 1950–1967 |
| John Harris | Labor | Western Australia | 1959 | 1947–1951, 1953–1959 |
| Bert Hendrickson | Labor | Victoria | 1959 | 1947–1971 |
| Denham Henty | Liberal | Tasmania | 1956 | 1950–1968 |
| Roy Kendall | Liberal | Queensland | 1959 | 1950–1965 |
| Pat Kennelly | Labor | Victoria | 1959 | 1953–1971 |
| Keith Laught | Liberal | South Australia | 1959 | 1951–1969 |
| Ted Maher | Country | Queensland | 1959 | 1950–1965 |
| John Marriott | Liberal | Tasmania | 1959 | 1953–1975 |
| Ted Mattner | Liberal | South Australia | 1956 | 1944–1946, 1950–1968 |
| John McCallum | Liberal | New South Wales | 1956 | 1950–1962 |
| Nick McKenna | Labor | Tasmania | 1956 | 1944–1968 |
| George McLeay | Liberal | South Australia | 1956 | 1935–1947, 1950–1955 |
| Alister McMullin | Liberal | New South Wales | 1959 | 1951–1971 |
| Theo Nicholls | Labor | South Australia | 1956 | 1944–1968 |
| Justin O'Byrne | Labor | Tasmania | 1959 | 1947–1981 |
| Sid O'Flaherty | Labor | South Australia | 1956 | 1944–1962 |
| Neil O'Sullivan | Liberal | Queensland | 1956 | 1947–1962 |
| Shane Paltridge (Note: Liberal Senator Shane Paltridge was the 6th and final Senator elected for Western Australia at the 1953 election and won the short term vacancy caused by the death of Edmund Piesse.) | Liberal | Western Australia | 1956 | 1951–1966 |
| Rex Pearson | Liberal | South Australia | 1959 | 1951–1961 |
| Dame Annabelle Rankin | Liberal | Queensland | 1956 | 1947–1971 |
| George Rankin | Country | Victoria | 1956 | 1950–1956 |
| Albert Reid | Country | New South Wales | 1956 | 1950–1962 |
| Agnes Robertson | Liberal / Ind. / Country (Note: Robertson resigned from the Liberal Party on 7 September 1955, after being dropped from the party's Senate ticket for the upcoming election. She sat as an Independent until 28 September, when she joined the Country Party.) | Western Australia | 1956 | 1950–1962 |
| John Ryan | Labor | South Australia | 1959 | 1950–1959 |
| Charles Sandford | Labor | Victoria | 1956 | 1947–1956, 1957–1966 |
| Malcolm Scott | Liberal | Western Australia | 1959 | 1950–1971 |
| Harrie Seward | Country | Western Australia | 1959 | 1951–1958 |
| Jim Sheehan | Labor | Victoria | 1956 | 1938–1940, 1944–1962 |
| John Spicer | Liberal | Victoria | 1956 | 1940–1944, 1950–1956 |
| Bill Spooner | Liberal | New South Wales | 1956 | 1950–1965 |
| Dame Dorothy Tangney | Labor | Western Australia | 1956 | 1943–1968 |
| Jim Toohey | Labor | South Australia | 1959 | 1953–1971 |
| Seddon Vincent | Liberal | Western Australia | 1956 | 1950–1964 |
| Robert Wardlaw | Liberal | Tasmania | 1956 | 1953–1962 |
| Dame Ivy Wedgwood | Liberal | Victoria | 1959 | 1950–1971 |
| Don Willesee | Labor | Western Australia | 1956 | 1950–1975 |
| Ian Wood | Liberal | Queensland | 1959 | 1950–1978 |
| Robert Wordsworth | Liberal | Tasmania | 1959 | 1950–1959 |
| Reg Wright | Liberal | Tasmania | 1956 | 1950–1978 |
