= Henry George Justice Party =

1950s political party in Victoria, Australia

The Henry George Justice Party, also called the Henry George League, was a minor political party in the Australian state of Victoria during the 1950s. The party followed the tenets of Georgism, an economic philosophy and ideology espoused by American economist Henry George (1839–1897) which advocates a single tax on the value of property.

The party nominated candidates for the 1951 Senate election, the 1953 Senate election, the 1955 Victorian state election, and the 1955 Senate election., but did not win seats in any of those elections.
