= Bill Robinson (Australian politician) =

English-born Australian politician

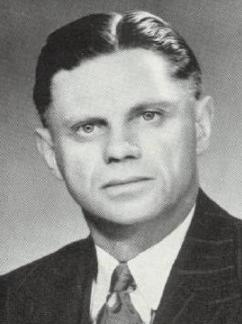

Senator for Western Australia
- In office 30 September 1952 – 8 May 1953
- Preceded by: Edmund Piesse

Personal details
- Born: 4 October 1907 Hertford, England, United Kingdom
- Died: 21 January 1981 (aged 70) Perth, Western Australia
- Party: Australian Country Party
- Occupation: Farmer

William Charles Campbell Bignall Robinson (4 October 1907 – 21 January 1981) was a British-born Australian politician. He was a Country Party member of the Australian Senate from 1952 to 1953.

Robinson was born in Hertford, England and migrated with his family to Western Australia around 1911, after which his family settled on a farm near Williams. Robinson was educated at Tarwonga State School and Northam Senior High School and farmed for many years at Williams. After a stint as acting secretary for the Williams Road Board, he was secretary to the Wandering Road Board from 1937 to 1942. Robinson enlisted in the Royal Australian Air Force during World War II, serving as a mechanic from 1942 to 1945. After a brief post-war return to his old role at Wandering, he was secretary of the Pingelly Road Board from 1946 to 1974, having been granted a leave of absence during his Senate term. Robinson was secretary of the Wandering and Pingelly branches and the Narrogin district council of the Country and Democratic League, a member of the wool committee and political executive of the Primary Producers' Association of Western Australia and secretary of the Pingelly Agricultural Society.

In 1952, he was appointed to the Senate as a Country Party member, filling the casual vacancy caused by the death of Senator Edmund Piesse. He was preselected in the unwinnable fourth position on the combined Liberal-Country ticket for the 1953 election, but was defeated. He later attempted to enter state politics as a Country and Democratic League candidate for the Legislative Assembly seat of Narrogin in 1956 and the Legislative Council in 1960, but was defeated both times.

Robinson died in 1981 in Perth and was cremated at Karrakatta Cemetery.
