= Alex Finlay =

Australian politician (1887–1963)

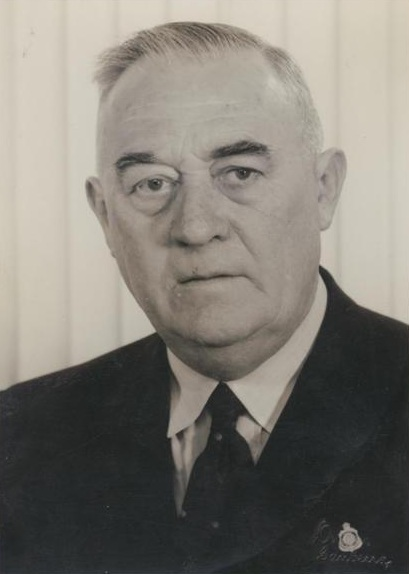

Senator for South Australia
- In office 1 July 1944 – 30 June 1953

Personal details
- Born: 14 November 1887 South Yarra, Victoria, Australia
- Died: 2 March 1963 (aged 75) Brighton, South Australia, Australia
- Party: Labor
- Spouse: Mary Scroop (m. 1910)
- Occupation: Coach-painter; Trade union official

Alexander Finlay (14 November 1887 – 2 March 1963) was an Australian politician and trade unionist. He was a member of the Australian Labor Party (ALP) and served as a senator for South Australia from 1944 to 1953. He had a long involvement with the Vehicle Builders' Employees' Federation of Australia, including as state secretary from 1934 to 1944.

== Early life ==
Finlay was born on 14 November 1887 in South Yarra, Victoria. He was the son of Florence and Alexander Finlay; his father worked as a painter.

Finlay and his family moved to his mother's home town of Adelaide when he was a child. He attended Unley Primary School from 1894 to 1899 and then took up an apprenticeship as a coach-painter. Finlay enlisted in the Australian Imperial Force in May 1918 as a private in the 10th Battalion. He embarked from Australia in July 1918 and saw overseas service in Britain and France.

Finlay was active in the Australian Natives' Association for several decades. He served as chief president of the state branch from 1934 to 1935. He was also a member of the Hindmarsh branch of the Returned Sailors' and Soldiers' Imperial League of Australia.

== Labour movement ==
Finlay joined the Australian Coachmakers Employees' Federation (ACEF) in the early 1920s. He became a branch secretary and treasurer in 1924 and was appointed as a full-time organiser in 1928. He was a delegate to the ACEF federal council from 1927 to 1933 and served a term as federal president. Finlay served as the union's general secretary from 1934 to 1944, during which time it was renamed the Vehicle Builders' Employees' Federation of Australia (VBEF). He worked closely with the management of General Motors-Holden's and was involved in the negotiation of "strike-free" agreements, with the VBEF becoming increasingly powerful in South Australia in line with the expansion of the automotive industry.

== Politics ==
Finlay made unsuccessful bids for ALP preselection in 1937 and 1939. He stood unsuccessfully for the Senate at the 1940 federal election.

At the 1943 election, Finlay was elected to a six-year Senate term commencing on 1 July 1944. He was re-elected to another six-year term at the 1949 election, with his term cut short by a double dissolution, and then re-elected to a three-year term at the 1951 election. Finlay did not seek re-election at the 1953 half-Senate election and attempted to resign from the Senate on 11 June 1953, apparently in the mistaken belief that a parliamentary pension would only be payable upon his resignation. After being advised of his error by the Senate clerk John Edwards, his resignation letter was disregarded and he retired at the end of his term on 30 June 1953.

Finlay was active on several Senate committees, including the Joint Select Committee on War Gratuity, the Joint Standing Committee on Broadcasting, and the Senate Select Committee on the Constitution Alteration (Avoidance of Double Dissolution Deadlocks) Bill. In 1946 he visited the United States as the Australian delegate to the International Labour Organization's meeting in Ohio. In the Senate, Finlay spoke regularly on matters relating to returned soldiers and the motor vehicle industry. After the ALP's defeat in 1949 he opposed the Menzies government's Communist Party Dissolution Act and campaigned for the "No" vote during the 1951 Australian Communist Party ban referendum.

== Personal life ==
In 1910, Finlay married Mary Scroop, with whom he had two daughters and a son. After several decades living in Bowden he and his wife retired to Brighton. He died at a private hospital in Brighton on 2 March 1963.
