= John Harris (Australian politician) =

Australian trade unionist and politician

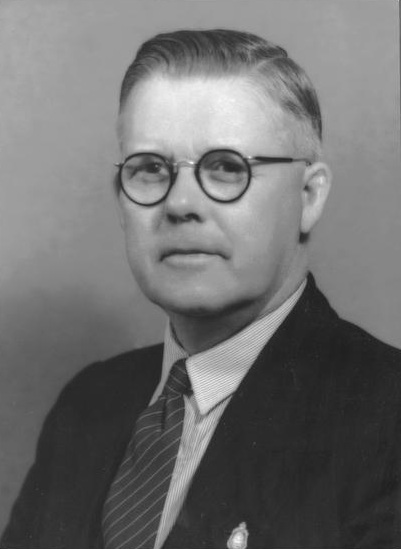

Senator for Western Australia
- In office 1 July 1947 – 28 April 1951
- In office 1 July 1953 – 30 June 1959

Personal details
- Born: 3 December 1890 Granville, New South Wales, Australia
- Died: 5 October 1974 (aged 83) Perth, Western Australia, Australia
- Party: Labor

John Harris (3 December 1890 – 5 October 1974) was an Australian trade unionist and politician who served as a Senator for Western Australia from 1947 to 1951 and from 1953 to 1959, representing the Labor Party. He was an engineer before entering politics.

== Early life ==
Harris was born in Sydney to Amy Florence (née Ellis) and John Harris, his father being an immigrant from Wales. His family moved to Perth when he was a child. After leaving school, Harris worked as a blacksmith. He enlisted in the Australian Imperial Force (AIF) in January 1916 (after previous service in the Militia), and during the war served in France with the 3rd Tunnelling Company. Harris worked as an engineer after the war's end and became involved with the Australasian Society of Engineers, in 1931 becoming state president.

== Politics and later life ==
Having previously served on the state executive, Harris won second place on Labor's senate ticket for the 1946 federal election, and was elected. His term began in July 1947. Harris lost his seat at the 1951 double-dissolution election, but won it back at the 1953 half-senate election. He did not contest the 1958 election, retiring at the end of his term in June 1959. In parliament, Harris spoke infrequently, but served on several committees and was generally a strong supporter of Labor policy. He did, however, oppose his party's stance on the banning the Communist Party, speaking in favour of a ban. Harris died in Perth in October 1874, aged 83. He had married Mabel Norton in 1916, with whom he had one son.

== See also ==
- Members of the Australian Senate
