= Edmund Piesse =

Australian politician

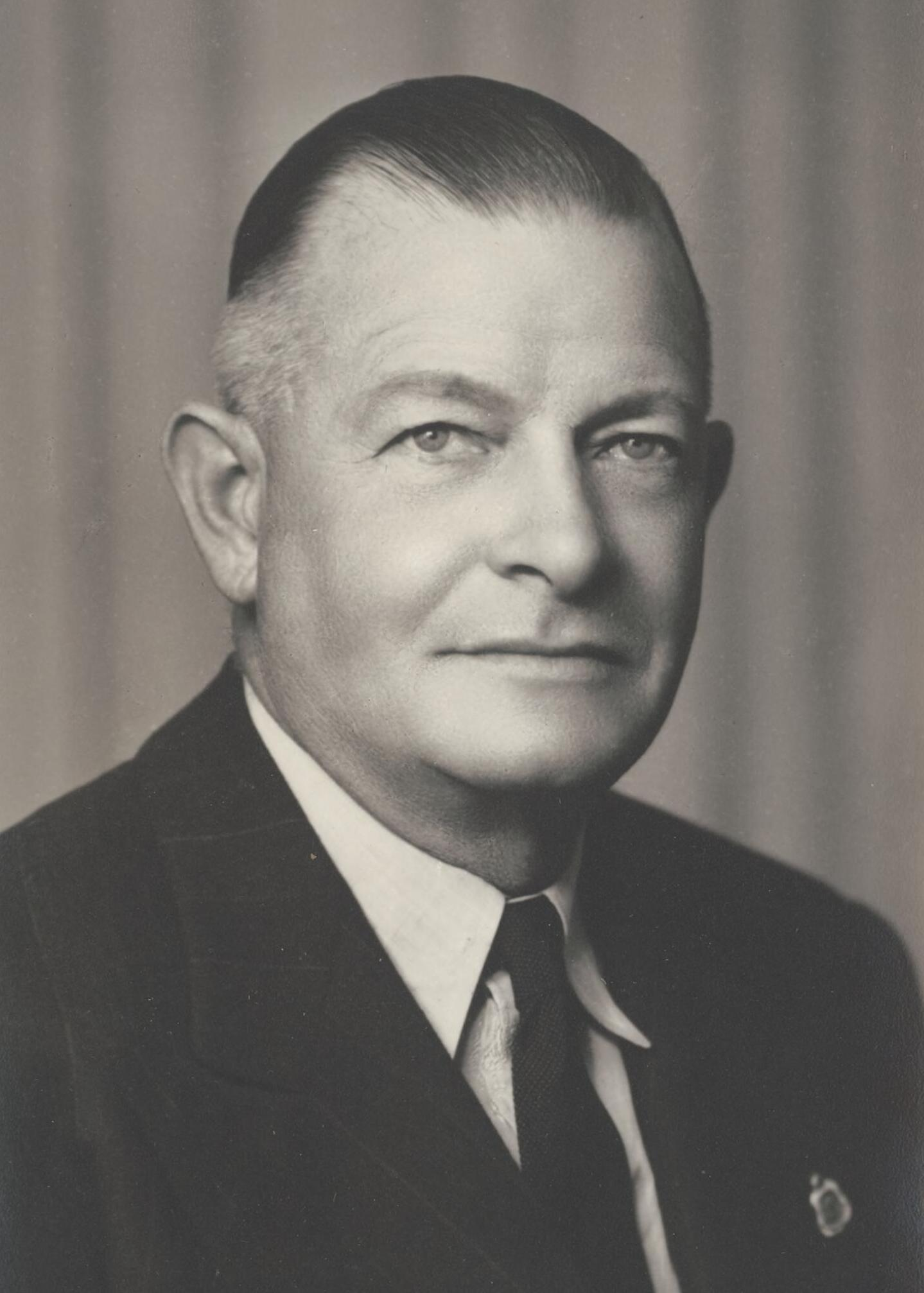

Senator for Western Australia
- In office 22 February 1950 – 25 August 1952
- Succeeded by: Bill Robinson

Personal details
- Born: 5 January 1900 Katanning, Western Australia, Australia
- Died: 25 August 1952 (aged 52) Katanning, Western Australia, Australia
- Party: Country
- Spouse: Mollie Longmire (m. 1936)
- Relations: Arnold Piesse (father)
- Occupation: Farmer; Businessman

Edmund Stephen Roper Piesse (5 January 1900 – 25 August 1952) was an Australian politician. He was a member of the Country Party and served as a Senator for Western Australia from 1950 until his death in 1952. Prior to entering parliament he was a prominent farmer and businessman in Katanning, Western Australia.

== Early life ==
Piesse was born on 5 January 1900 in Katanning, Western Australia. He was one of three children born to Margaret Mary (née Chipper) and Arnold Edmund Piesse. His family was prominent in the local region, with his father and three uncles — Frederick, Charles and Alfred Piesse — serving terms in the parliament of Western Australia.

Piesse's mother died in 1902 when he was two years old. His father remarried in 1904 and had two more children with his second wife. Piesse attended the local state school until the age of ten, when he was sent to board at Guildford Grammar School, Perth. He left school in 1917 to manage the family farming property Langaweira near Katanning, during his father's illness.

In June 1918, Piesse enlisted in the Australian Imperial Force as a private in the 3rd Western Australian Reinforcement. He arrived in England in October 1918, but following the armistice of 11 November 1918 returned to Australia and was discharged in January 1919. Piesse returned to farming after his war service, becoming master of the merino stud at Langaweira. He later served as a director of Katanning Flour Mills Ltd. and as chairman of the Katanning Stock and Trading Company.

== Public activities ==
Piesse was a prominent figure in Katanning, holding office in a number of community organisations. He was president of the Katanning Agricultural Society from 1933 to 1942 and was elected to the Katanning Road Board in 1946. He also served as a director of the Kobeelya Church of England Girls' School and on the state executive of the Toc H charity.

== Political career ==
In March 1949, Piesse was endorsed by the Country and Democratic League of Western Australia as its lead Senate candidate, having previously served on the state executive for two years and as an organiser in the Great Southern region. At the 1949 federal election, he was elected to a six-year term commencing on 22 February 1950. His term was cut short by a double dissolution but he was re-elected to a further term at the 1951 election.

In the Senate, Piesse supported the Menzies government and spoke mainly on Western Australian and rural matters. He was interested in taxation reform, arguing for simplified income tax assessments, reforms to income averaging for wool-growers, and for fuel tax collected by the federal government to be returned to the states for road works.

== Personal life ==
In 1936, Piesse married Mollie Longmire, with whom he had one surviving daughter.

Piesse was discovered dead in his car near the Katanning rifle range on 26 August 1952. A piece of hose-pipe was attached from the exhaust pipe into the car and a post-mortem inquest found that he had died of carbon-monoxide poisoning. His father had also committed suicide.
