= Bill Aylett =

Australian politician

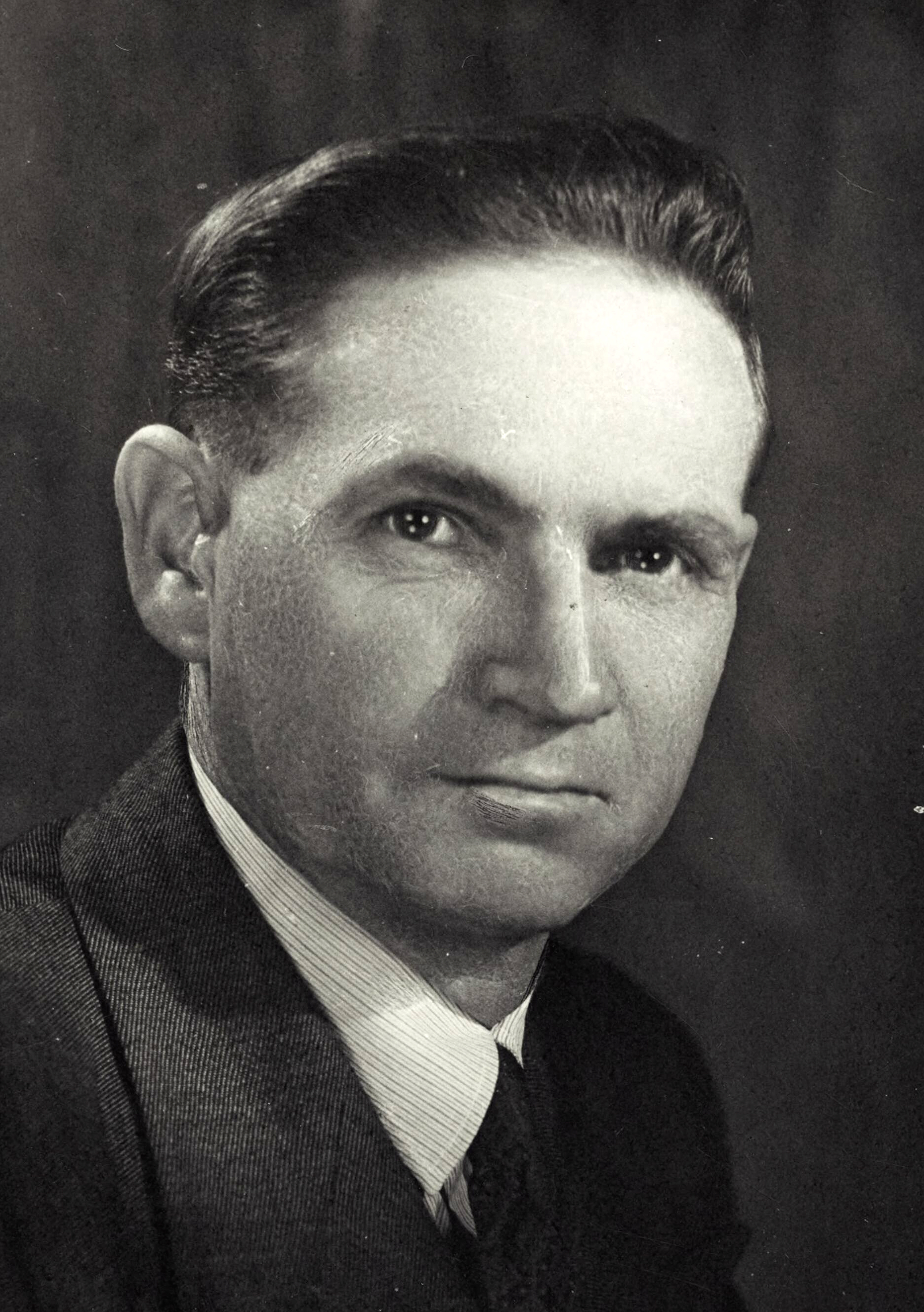

Senator for Tasmania
- In office 1 July 1938 – 30 June 1965

Personal details
- Born: 15 November 1900 Wynyard, Tasmania, Australia
- Died: 10 August 1976 (aged 75) Palm Beach, Queensland, Australia
- Party: Labor
- Spouse: Ruby Victoria Gladys Goldsmith (m. 1920–1963)
- Relations: Charley Aylett (brother)

William Edward Aylett (15 November 1900 – 10 August 1976) was an Australian politician who served as a Senator for Tasmania from 1938 to 1965, representing the Labor Party (ALP). He worked as a miner, mail contractor, and farmer before entering politics. He was first elected to the Senate at the age of 36 and won re-election on five more occasions.

Aylett was placed at the bottom of the ALP ticket for the 1953 election, but issued his own campaign material and was re-elected. He was subsequently censured by the ALP state executive for his defiance of the party's instructions. In 1959, a year into his final term, Aylett decided to move to Queensland's Gold Coast, for what he said were health reasons. He kept his office in Launceston, but his decision to move states proved controversial. In 1962, Aylett's frequent absences from the Senate came under public scrutiny. He was censured by the ALP federal executive for his attendance record, although moves to expel him were unsuccessful, and he retired from parliament at the next election.

== Early life ==
Aylett was born on 15 November 1900 in Wynyard, Tasmania. He was the sixth of the twelve children of Harriett Susanna (née Matthews) and Edward Aylett; his younger brother Charley served in the Tasmanian House of Assembly. Aylett's father was a farmer and furrier. His grandfather, William Aylett, arrived in Australia as a convict and was transported to Van Diemen's Land in 1845 after stealing two beehives.

In 1914, Aylett and his family moved to Waratah, where his father was the manager of a coffee palace. He began working in the Mount Bischoff tin mines at the age of 16 and later mined osmiridium. He married Ruby Goldsmith in Burnie on 10 July 1920, and the couple had a daughter and son together. Around the time of his marriage he was working as a driver at Wivenhoe. Aylett later moved to Wonthaggi, Victoria, to work at the State Coal Mine. In a speech to the Senate in 1942, he recalled being ordered to lie "in cold water under hanging rock which was likely to fall at any moment and scrape out the mullock which had accumulated there". He refused to do so and was fired but was rehired the following day after other miners agitated for his return. Aylett eventually returned to Tasmania, working at Deloraine as a mail contractor and later as a farmer at Mole Creek. He moved to Burnie in 1936.

Aylett was the founding secretary of the Mole Creek branch of the ALP, and became a life member of the branch. He stood unsuccessfully for the House of Assembly at the 1937 state election, running on the Labor ticket in the Division of Darwin.

== Senate ==
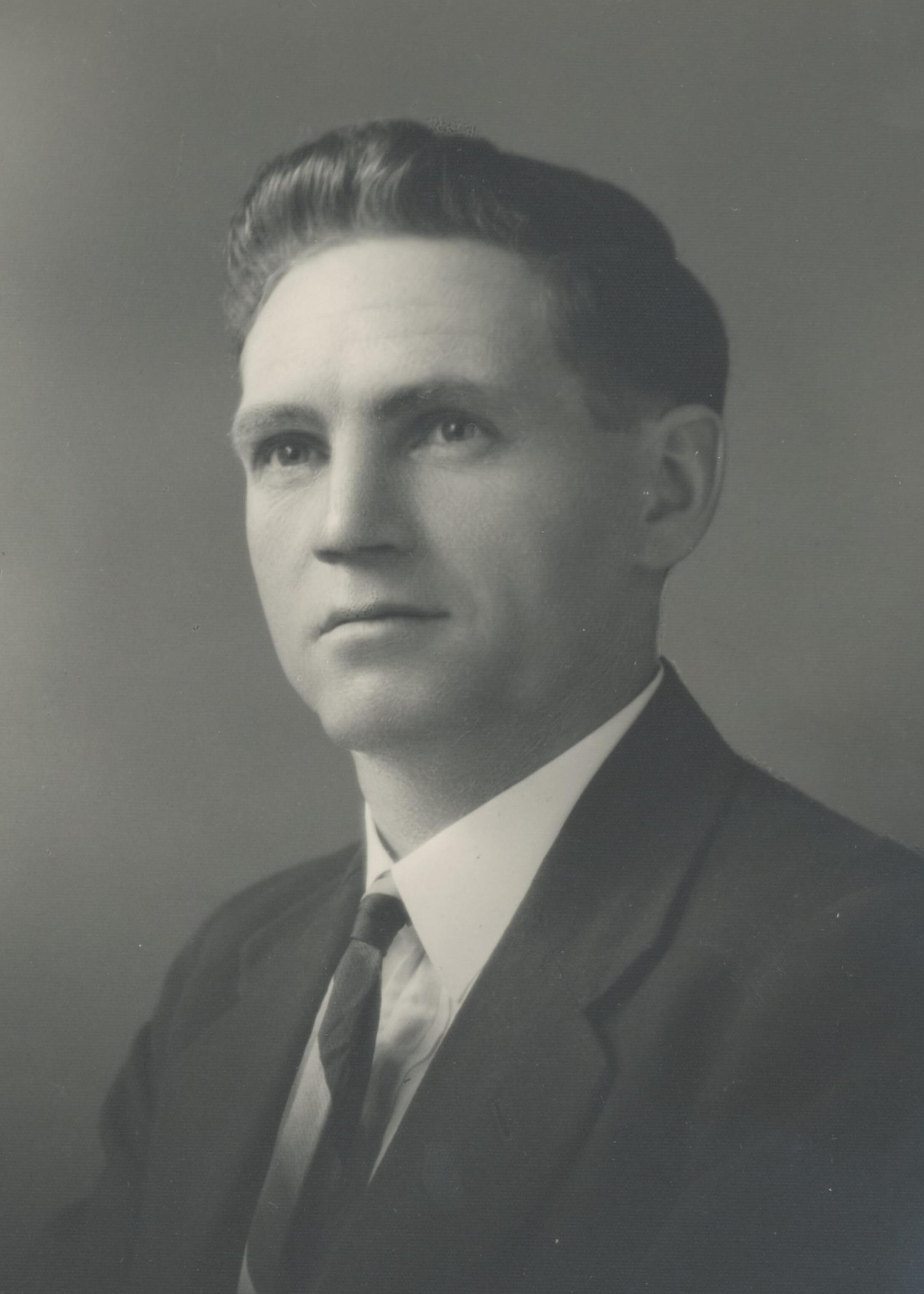
Aylett in 1938, as a senator-elect

Aylett was elected to the Senate at the 1937 federal election, aged 36, polling the most votes of any Tasmanian candidate. On election day in Launceston he knocked down a woman with his car while she was travelling to a polling booth. She suffered cuts to her leg and was taken to Launceston General Hospital; she was only able to vote when state Labor MP John Madden drove her to a booth shortly before the close of polling.

Aylett's first term began on 1 July 1938. He served on the senate committees for printing (1938–1943), regulations and ordinances (1943–1946), disputed returns and qualifications (1950–1951), and standing orders (1950–1951), as well as the joint committees on rural industries (1941–1942) and public works (1943–1946) and a select committee into road safety (1959). He devoted most of his attention to regional issues, speaking on subjects as trivial as the dangers of the steps at the New Norfolk post office. In 1944, he "produced a neatly packaged rabbit, recommending it as meat for wartime Australians". He took an interest in the remote community of King Island, lobbying on behalf of its residents and serving as a delegate for the local ALP branch. (Note: Issues that Aylett handled for King Islanders included the resumption of the island shipping service during World War II, an oversupply of cheese, the need for daily air services, and wastage of firewood by public-service employees. In 1952 he represented the Grassy branch of the ALP at the state conference.)

From March 1942 to February 1943, Aylett was assistant minister to Eddie Ward, the Minister for Labour and National Service, on issues relating to Tasmania. He was re-elected at the 1943 federal election, again winning the most votes of any Tasmanian candidate. Aylett served two terms on the ALP state executive (1945–1947, 1954–1958), and represented Tasmania at federal conferences and on the federal executive. He was re-elected to a three-year Senate term at the 1951 election, after a double dissolution. In 1954 he travelled outside Australia for the first and only time, as a delegate to a Commonwealth Parliamentary Association conference in Kenya.

=== 1953 election ===
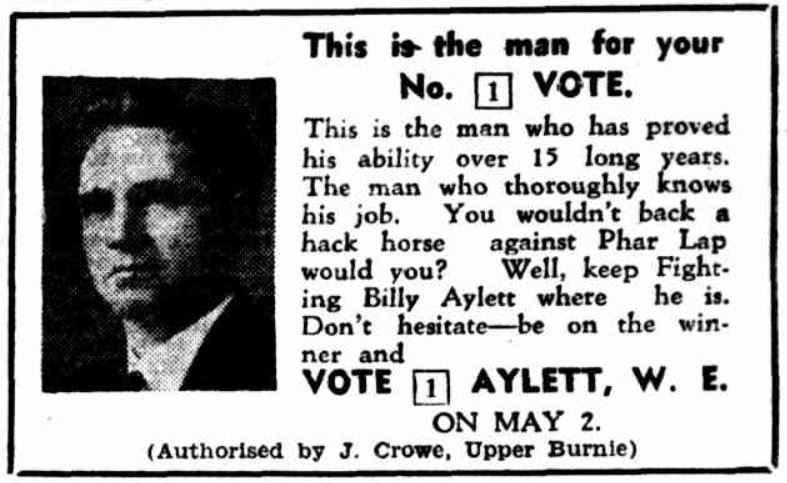
Advertisement used by Aylett at the 1953 election, encouraging voters to give him their first preference despite being ranked fourth on the ALP ticket

In 1952, Aylett was defeated in the preselection ballot for Labor's Senate ticket at the 1953 election. He and Reg Murray polled an equal number of votes, before Murray's name was drawn out of a hat. Another serving senator, Bill Morrow, was also dropped from the ticket. Aylett publicly criticised the ALP state executive, and his supporters in the labour movement attempted to overturn the result of the ballot. However, the death of Jack Chamberlain in January 1953 opened up an additional vacancy in the Senate, allowing Aylett to return to the ticket. He was ranked fourth on the ticket, behind George Cole, Justin O'Byrne, and Murray.

Aylett defied the ALP's official campaign material, issuing his own how-to-vote cards and telling voters to rank him first. His campaign was successful, as he out-polled both O'Byrne and Murray by significant margins. This resulted in Murray failing to win a seat, and he subsequently wrote privately to Fred Daly that Aylett had won re-election "by treachery, fraud and wilful deception". In June 1953, he was censured by the ALP state executive for his actions. The following month, the federal executive also debated a resolution of censure, moved by the New South Wales delegation, but decided to refer the case back to the state executive. Until the election of Lisa Singh in 2016, Aylett was the only person to have been elected to the Senate ahead of a higher-ranked candidate on the same ticket.

=== Final term ===
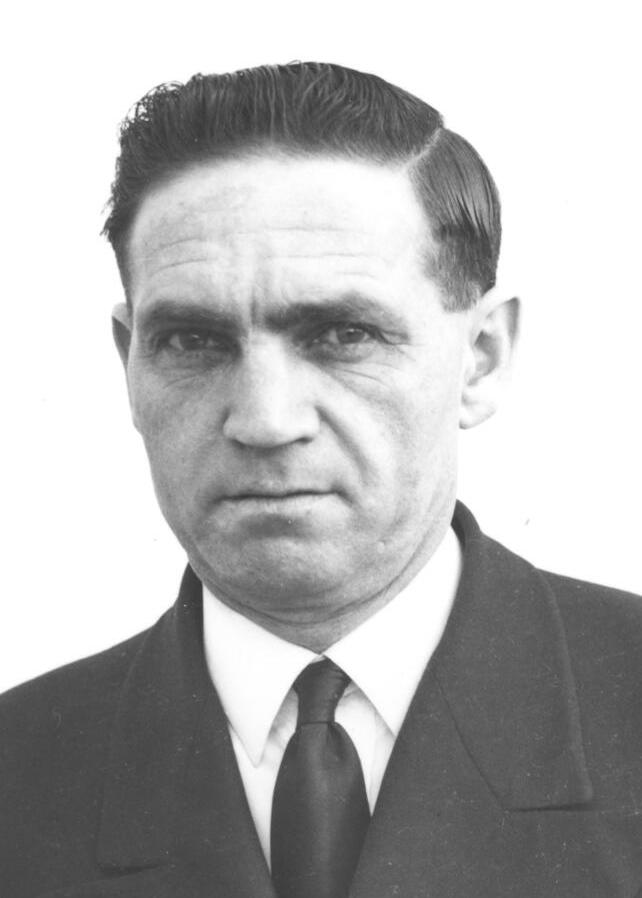
Aylett towards the end of his career

Aylett was re-elected to a sixth term in the Senate at the 1958 federal election. In September 1959, it was made public that he had decided to move to the Gold Coast; he and his son purchased four shops and two flats at Palm Beach. Aylett's decision to live in Queensland while representing Tasmania in the Senate proved controversial. After media criticism, he stated that he had moved primarily for health reasons, as he had suffered a stroke in 1956 and his wife had also been in poor health. He said that he would maintain an office in Launceston, and promised to live on the Gold Coast only during the summer recess, when parliament was not in session. The state executive determined that no disciplinary action was possible as he had not broken any party rules. In 1961, Aylett was accused of exerting undue pressure on members of the Gold Coast City Council to approve a building application.

In August 1962, the ALP caucus voted to require its members to attend all parliamentary sittings and vote in every division, unless exempted. The new rules were "directed chiefly at Senator Aylett", who had been absent without explanation on a number of occasions that year. In October, the ALP federal executive unanimously passed a resolution expressing "grave concern" at his "continued and unwarranted absences from Parliament". In the preceding year, he had been present in the Senate on only 18 out of 47 sitting days and had only voted twice. Aylett was asked to show cause as to why he should not be expelled from the ALP. He appeared before the state executive, which took no action after he attributed his absences to health difficulties. Aylett was quizzed about his attendance record in a television interview, where according to the Canberra Times he "repeatedly evaded requests to pinpoint his achievements for Tasmania in his 25 years in the Senate", instead telling the interviewer that "great men such as Sir Winston Churchill had not bragged about their achievements".

== Later life ==
Aylett did not seek re-election in 1964 and his term ended on 30 June 1965. He remained involved in public affairs after leaving parliament, serving as president of the Palm Beach Association (1964–1970) and president of the United Council of Progress Associations of Gold Coast City (1969–1970). He died on the Gold Coast on 10 August 1976, aged 75. His obituary in the Hobart Mercury noted that he had "upset his party and political tradition" and would be remembered for "controversy about his absenteeism from Parliament and his electorate". In the foreword to the third volume of The Biographical Dictionary of the Australian Senate, Harry Evans describes Aylett as "the outstanding example" of senators "who simply occupied spaces with little or no contribution".
