= Robert Wardlaw =

Australian politician

Senator for Tasmania
- In office 9 May 1953 – 30 June 1962
- Preceded by: John Marriott

Personal details
- Born: 5 August 1889 Mathinna, Tasmania
- Died: 27 June 1964 (aged 74) Launceston, Tasmania, Australia
- Party: Liberal
- Spouse: Jessica Greatrex (m. 1923)
- Relations: Alan Wardlaw (brother)
- Occupation: Soldier; Businessman; Farmer

Robert Wardlaw (5 August 1889 – 27 June 1964) was an Australian politician. He was a Senator for Tasmania from 1953 to 1962, representing the Liberal Party. He was a World War I veteran and was a prominent businessman and farmer in north-east Tasmania prior to entering politics.

== Early life ==
Wardlaw was born on 5 August 1889 in Avoca, Tasmania. He was one of seven children born to Dora Dove (née Miller) and James Bennett Wardlaw. His father was a sheep farmer who had moved to Mathinna to work as a goldminer and later established a butcher's shop.

Wardlaw was raised in Mathinna and received little formal education. His father died in 1906, after which his mother moved the family to Scottsdale and ran another butcher's shop. In December 1916, Wardlaw joined his older brother Alan Wardlaw in the Australian Imperial Force. He served in the Middle East with the 2nd and 7th Light Horse Regiments, where he suffered from recurring bouts of malaria. He was discharged in January 1920. He was awarded a one-fifth medical pension after the war's end.

== Business career ==
After returning to Australia, Wardlaw and his brother Thomas ran the general store in Ringarooma, Tasmania. They later acquired the general store in Branxholm and established Wardlaw Bros Pty Ltd. Their general merchandising firm had up to 60 employees and acted as "butchers, bakers, grocers, drapers, ironmongers, proprietors of Ringarooma Garage, land and estate agents, buyers of all classes of stock and produce, agents for London insurance, life insurance, auctioneers and dealers in Ford cars".

Wardlaw later went into agriculture, becoming a dairy farmer and one of Tasmania's largest pig farmers. He was president of the Tasmanian Farmers' Federation from 1949 to 1951 and chairman of the Tasmanian Rural Industries Board from 1951 to 1953.

== Politics ==
Wardlaw was an unsuccessful candidate for the Tasmanian Legislative Council in 1939, running to replace his deceased brother Alan in the seat of South Esk.

Wardlaw was elected to the Senate at the 1953 half-Senate election, running on the Liberal Party's ticket in Tasmania. Under the constitutional provisions at the time, he was elected to fill the remainder of Liberal senator Jack Chamberlain's Senate term. The casual vacancy caused by Chamberlain's death had originally been filled by John Marriott in March 1953 as the endorsed Liberal candidate. Wardlaw nominated against Marriott as an endorsed Liberal candidate, but placed third on the ballot behind Marriott and independent candidate Bill Wedd.

Wardlaw was re-elected to a full six-year term at the 1955 federal election. He did not recontest his seat at the 1961 election with his term ending on 30 June 1962. In the Senate, Wardlaw spoke regularly on matters relating to primary industry and rural Tasmanians. He supported the Menzies government's "forward defence" policies including Australian involvement in Malaya. He was anti-communist and asserted that "the difference between socialism and communism is the same as the difference between drowning in 12 feet of water and drowning in 20 feet of water".

Wardlaw crossed the floor on nine occasions during his Senate tenure.

== Personal life ==
In 1923, Wardlaw married Jessica Greatrex; there were no children of the marriage. He moved to Launceston in 1953 and died at his home there on 28 June 1964, aged 74.
