= Bill Morrow (Australian politician) =

Australian politician (1888–1980)

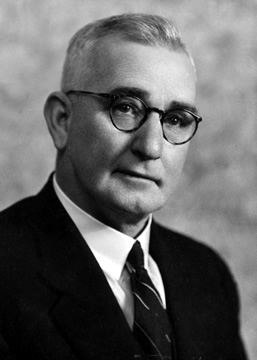

Senator for Tasmania
- In office 1 July 1947 – 30 June 1953

Personal details
- Born: 22 October 1888 Rockhampton, Colony of Queensland
- Died: 12 July 1980 (aged 91) Sydney, New South Wales, Australia
- Party: Labor (1908–1938, 1942–1953)
- Other political affiliations: Tasmanian Labour Group (1953)
- Spouse: Kate Scateni (m. 1910)
- Occupation: Railway worker; Trade unionist; Politician
- Awards: Lenin Peace Prize (1961)

William Morrow (22 October 1888 – 12 July 1980) was an Australian trade unionist, politician and peace activist. He was a Senator for Tasmania from 1947 to 1953, representing the Australian Labor Party (ALP) until his resignation in 1953 and unsuccessful bid for re-election as an independent.

Morrow was born in Rockhampton, Queensland. He left school at the age of 10 and joined his father on Queensland Railways, working as a train driver in Far North Queensland. He was active in the labour movement from a young age and was a long-serving officeholder in the Australian Railways Union (ARU). Morrow moved to Tasmania in 1936 as ARU state secretary, where he oversaw a revitalisation of the union. He was expelled from the ALP in 1938 following conflict with the state government, but was readmitted in 1942.

Morrow was elected to the Senate at the 1946 federal election. An outspoken socialist and pacifist, his opposition to attempts to ban the Communist Party and Australian involvement in the Korean War caused difficulties for the ALP as it sought to counter Red Scare tactics. He was disendorsed by the ALP prior to the 1953 Senate election and subsequently resigned to sit as an independent, unsuccessfully seeking election at the head of a Tasmanian Labour Group ticket. After leaving parliament Morrow was prominent in the peace movement, serving on the bureau of the Soviet-backed World Peace Council and on Australian affiliates. He was awarded the Lenin Peace Prize by the Soviet Union in 1961.

== Early life ==
Morrow was born on 22 October 1888 in Rockhampton, Queensland. He was the fourth of eleven children born to Amelia (née Greenhalgh) and William Morrow. His mother was born in Lancashire, England, while his father was born in County Armagh, Ireland.

Morrow spent his early years in central Queensland where his father worked for Queensland Railways. He attended state schools in Fairymead, Bundaberg, Kangaroo Point and South Brisbane. When he was nine years old, the family moved to Mareeba in Far North Queensland, where his father was an inspector on the construction of the Mareeba to Atherton railway line. He left school at the age of ten to work alongside his father as a wood and water joey. He subsequently worked his way up through the railway ranks, moving from fettler to ganger to guard to engine-driver.

== Labour movement ==
=== Queensland ===
Morrow was involved in the labour movement from a young age and in 1908 joined the Queensland Workers' Political Organization, the predecessor to the Australian Labor Party (ALP). He joined the Amalgamated Workers' Association (AWA) in 1911 and was blacklisted for a period for taking part in the 1912 Brisbane general strike. He joined the Queensland Railways Union (QRU) in 1915 and became secretary of its Charter Towers branch. He was also president of the local trades and labour council.

In 1921, the QRU merged into the federal Australian Railways Union (ARU) and Morrow was appointed secretary of the North Queensland district, based in Townsville. He was elected to the ARU state council in 1922 but resigned his positions in 1925 due to poor health and dissatisfaction with the ARU central executive. Over the following decade he worked variously as a hotel-keeper in Townsville, as a travelling salesman, and as a storekeeper in Mount Isa. He served on the Cloncurry Shire Council from 1934 to 1935.

=== Tasmania ===
In 1936, Morrow was recruited by his former colleague Tim Moroney to move to Tasmania and resume his involvement with the labour movement. He was appointed state secretary of the ARU's Tasmanian branch, based in Launceston, and oversaw a revitalisation of the union. He served on the federal council of the ARU from 1937 to 1947, including as a vice-president from 1937 to 1942.

According to historian Michael Roe, Morrow became "a radical working-class leader, the like of whom Tasmania has rarely known". He developed a power base at the Launceston Railway Workshops and "gave a militant bite to the union's Railways Gazette". Morrow's left-wing views brought him into conflict with the ALP state government of Albert Ogilvie on several occasions. He once observed that "the industrial outlook and the class consciousness of the workers of this state are approximately twenty years behind the workers of the mainland". An initial conflict with Ogilvie occurred in mid-1937 when the state government refused a wage increase to railway workers, citing a recent increase in the national basic wage.

At the ALP state conference in Burnie in March 1938, Ogilvie moved a motion calling on compulsory military training for home defence, seen as a way of emphasising the party's defence credentials. Morrow was a leading critic of the motion, which the ALP nonetheless announced had passed "unanimously". Morrow's continued public criticism of the motion led to his expulsion from the ALP in May 1938. In response, the ARU repudiated the actions of the ALP and announced that "the time has come when a true Working Class Party should be formed". However, no serious moves were made to disaffiliate the union from the ALP.

In July 1938, Morrow secured the passage of an anti-war motion at the state conference of the Australian Council of Trade Unions (ACTU). His motion stated that the council would not agree to "any form of compulsory militarism [...] we absolutely repudiate any suggestion of the workers co-operating with it in any shape or form". Morrow subsequently faced a challenge to his authority from the National Union of Railwaymen (NUR), a new union friendlier to the state government. His continued activism after his expulsion from the ALP made him a continued problem for Ogilvie, who reportedly offered him the post of commissioner of railways in an attempt to "silence the dissident". He was eventually readmitted to the ALP in 1942 and was elected to the party's state executive in 1944.

== Parliamentary politics ==
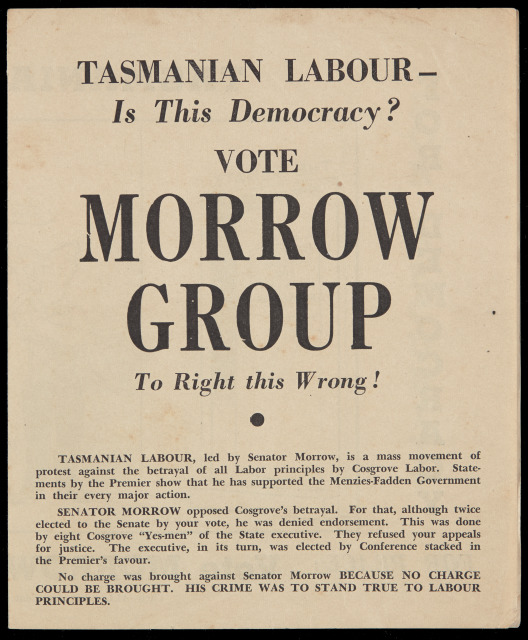
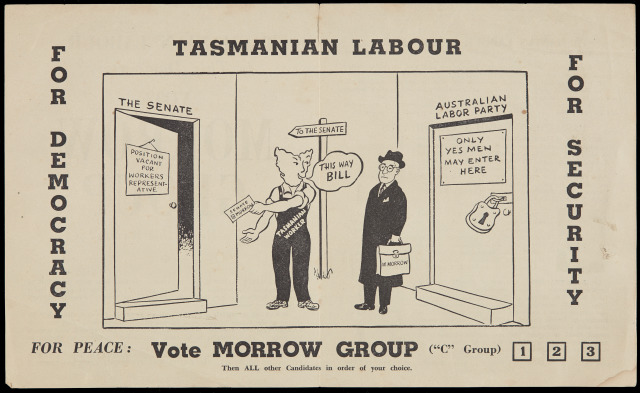

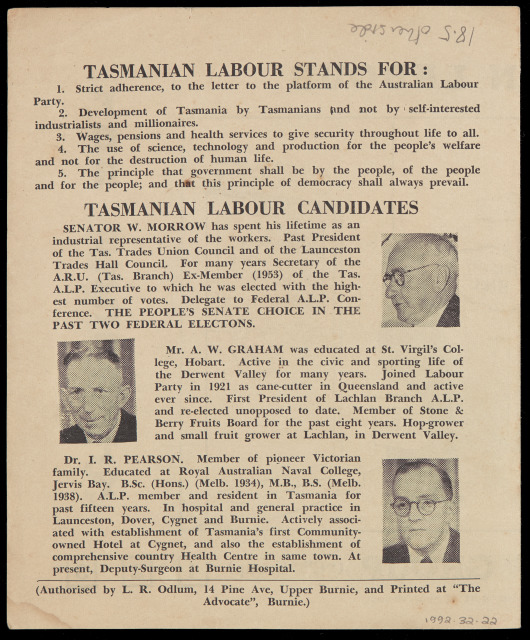
How-to-vote card prepared for Morrow's Tasmanian Labour Group at the 1953 Senate election

While in Queensland, Morrow was floated as a possible successor to federal MP Charles McDonald prior to the 1925 federal election. McDonald had late-stage Parkinson's disease, but Morrow and the party were reluctant to be seen as disloyal and oppose his re-endorsement. McDonald ultimately died the day before the election, leading to his non-Labor opponent being declared elected unopposed.

After moving to Tasmania, Morrow stood unsuccessfully for the Launceston City Council in 1941 and for the Tasmanian Legislative Council in 1942.

=== Senate term ===
At the 1946 federal election, Morrow was elected to a six-year Senate term beginning on 1 July 1947, running in second position on the ALP ticket in Tasmania. Following a double dissolution, his initial term was cut short and he was re-elected to a further three-year term at the 1951 election.

In his maiden speech to the Senate, Morrow "declared his socialist faith" and stated "I do not pretend to represent the whole of the people of Tasmania. I shall be quite honest about that. I represent only those individuals who make up the great working class in this country". His endorsement by the ALP was said to have "appalled" certain right-wing Australian Workers' Union (AWU) members of the party, and "some AWU stalwarts withdrew their nominations in disgust". Morrow supported the Chifley government's attempts to nationalise the private banking sector and called on the government "to socialise completely the ownership of the means of production". However, he was later one of the few ALP parliamentarians to criticise the government's intervention in the 1949 coal strike.

In the early 1950s, following the ALP's defeat at the 1949 election, Morrow opposed the Menzies government's attempt to ban the Communist Party. He also opposed Australian involvement in the Korean War, with a speech on the latter re-broadcast on Radio Moscow. His outspoken views caused difficulties for the ALP as its opponents employed Red Scare tactics; at the 1951 election the Liberal Party campaigned in Tasmania on the slogan "Menzies or Moscow". Morrow's own membership of the Australian Communist Party was "long suspected, but never proved". He was investigated by the Commonwealth Investigation Service, which concluded that he had "covered his tracks very cleverly, and he is either a sympathiser or else a most dangerous man".

=== 1953 re-election bid ===
Prior to the 1953 half-Senate election, Tasmanian premier Robert Cosgrove persuaded the ALP state executive to remove Morrow from the party's ticket. Two of Morrow's supporters were subsequently expelled from the party after agitating for his return. On 9 April 1953, Morrow announced that he had resigned from the ALP to sit as an independent senator and would re-contest his seat at the head of the Tasmanian Labour Group ticket. His disendorsement prompted "widespread anger in the labour movement" and led the party's federal leader H. V. Evatt to offer him a position on his staff in an attempt at conciliation, which Morrow rejected.

Morrow and the two other candidates on the Tasmanian Labour Group ticket campaigned on the basis of restoring the ALP's "socialist principles" and defeating "bureaucratic influences" that had made the ALP undemocratic. They initially planned to run a full slate of candidates at the 1955 Tasmanian state election. The group polled less than six percent of the vote at the Senate election and soon disbanded, with Morrow making no attempts to resume his parliamentary career.

== Later life ==
After his defeat at the 1953 election, Morrow visited Hungary to attend the conference of the Cominform-backed World Peace Council. The following year he was appointed secretary of the New South Wales Peace Council. He was elected to the WPC bureau and made frequent overseas trips. In 1957 he helped organise the World Conference against Atomic and Hydrogen Bombs in Tokyo. Morrow met African-American singer Paul Robeson through their shared involvement in the peace movement. He helped organise Robeson's visit to Australia in 1960 and meetings with various left-wing groups.

In 1959, the WPC awarded Morrow its Joliot-Curie Medal. In 1961, he was awarded the Lenin Peace Prize for 1960 by the Soviet government, with his co-recipients including Cuban president Fidel Castro and Guinean president Ahmed Sékou Touré. The gold medal he received is held by the National Museum of Australia.

Morrow was also active in the Australia–China Society, which sought the establishment of diplomatic relations between Australia and the People's Republic of China. He served on the national executive of the society and as Queensland state president, visiting China three times at the invitation of the Chinese government. According to the Chinese government's English-language newspaper Peking Review, he did "much work to promote friendship between Australia and China" and following the death of Chinese leader Mao Zedong in 1976 "made a special trip from Queensland to call at the Chinese Embassy to offer his condolences".

== Personal life ==
In 1910, Morrow married Katherine Victoria "Kate" Scateni, the daughter of an Italian miner. The couple had two daughters and a son together. His wife suffered a severe stroke in 1955 and was paralysed; she died in 1963.

Morrow retired to Brisbane in the 1960s. He died on 12 July 1980, aged 91, while visiting his daughter in Sydney. A biography of Morrow titled Fly a Rebel Flag was published in 1986, based on a series of interviews author Audrey Johnson conducted with him shortly before his death.
