= Roy Kendall =

Australian politician

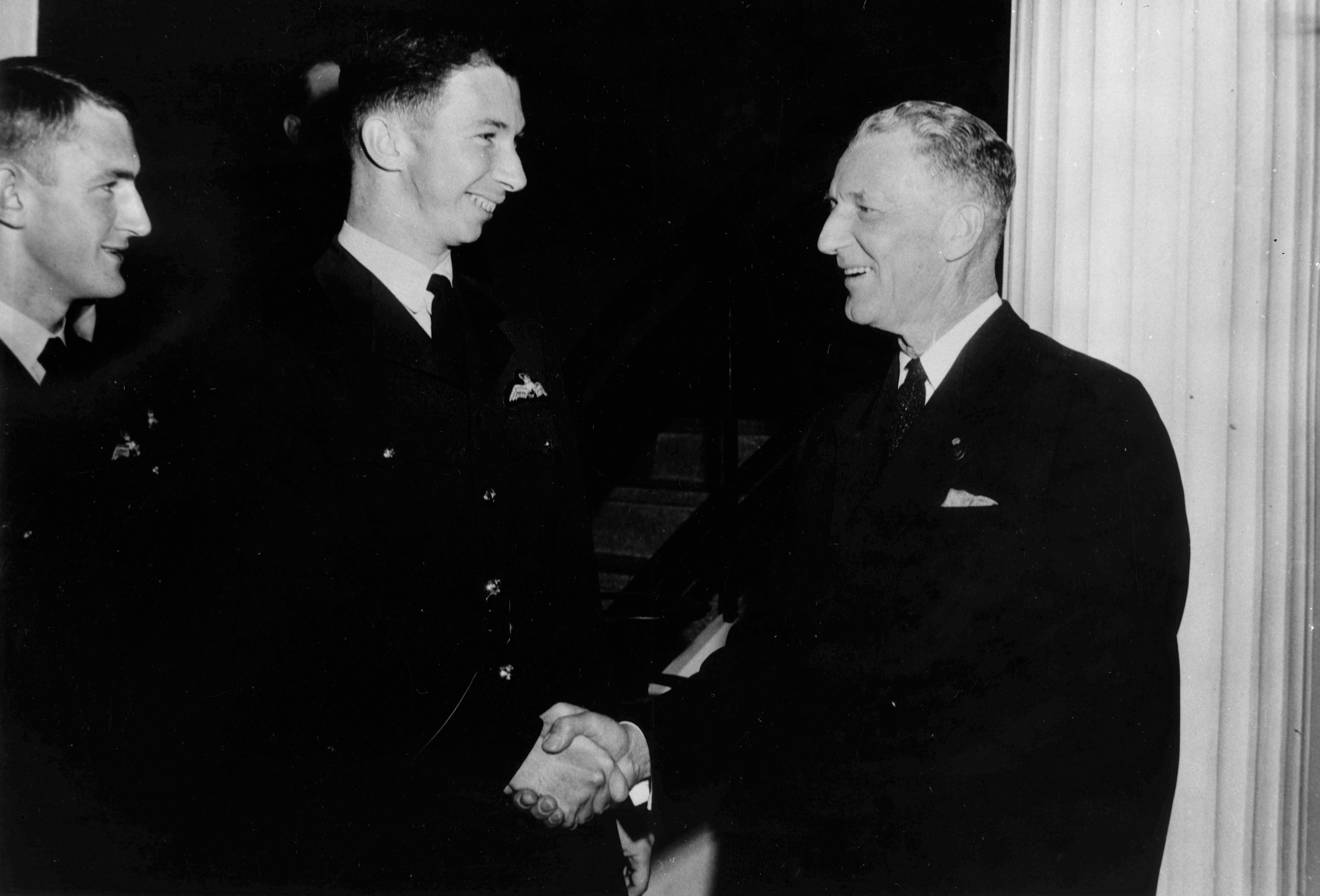

Senator for Queensland
- In office 22 February 1950 – 30 June 1965

Personal details
- Born: 9 June 1899 Battersea, London, England, United Kingdom
- Died: 9 March 1972 (aged 72) Mount Ommaney, Queensland, Australia
- Party: Liberal Party of Australia
- Spouses: Olga Kapelman (m. 1923; div. 1929) Doris Margery MacPhee (m. 1929)
- Occupation: Intelligence officer, merchant seaman, newsagent

Military service
- Allegiance: United Kingdom
- Branch/service: Royal Navy
- Years of service: 1939–1945
- Rank: Captain
- Commands: Secret Intelligence Australia
- Battles/wars: World War II

Roy Kendall (9 June 1899 – 9 March 1972) was an English-born Australian politician and intelligence officer for the British Secret Intelligence Service.

Born in London, he was educated at Bristol Cathedral School before becoming a merchant seaman. After serving in the Royal Naval Reserve from 1914 to 1918, he was recruited by Britain's Secret Intelligence Service (MI6) in December 1941 for the purpose of "penetrating the Japanese Mandated Islands or other areas in the Pacific". He was "vouched for" by the Australian director of naval intelligence, and in 1942 was appointed head of Secret Intelligence Australia, a branch of MI6 in Australia, reporting directly to Winston Churchill.

After the war, he became a newsagent in Brisbane, Australia. In 1949, he was elected to the Australian Senate as a Liberal senator. He remained in the Senate until retiring in 1964. Kendall died in 1972.
