= Condon Byrne =

Australian politician

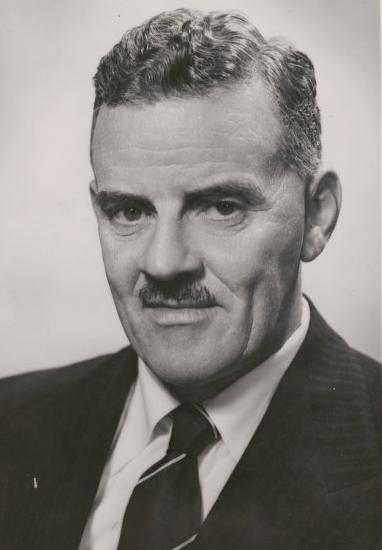

Senator for Queensland
- In office 28 April 1951 – 30 June 1959
- In office 1 July 1968 – 18 May 1974

Personal details
- Born: 25 May 1910 Yea, Victoria, Australia
- Died: 25 November 1993 (aged 83) Brisbane, Queensland, Australia
- Resting place: South Brisbane Cemetery
- Party: ALP (1951–57); QLP (1957–62); DLP (1962–74)
- Occupation: Barrister

Condon Bryan Byrne (25 May 1910 – 25 November 1993), Australian politician, was a Senator for the Australian Labor Party and later the Democratic Labor Party. Prior to entering politics he was private secretary to Vince Gair who was then Premier of Queensland.

Initially elected to the Senate for the ALP in 1951, he joined much of the Queensland ALP who split with the party to form the Queensland Labor Party (QLP – later to merge with the Democratic Labor Party DLP) in 1957.

He was a barrister by profession. He never married.

Losing his seat in 1958, he remained active in the Democratic Labor Party and won a Queensland senate seat in the 1967 Senate Election.

Condon Byrne joined the rest of the DLP senators in losing their seats in the 1974 double dissolution election, where public outrage at the appointment of former DLP leader Vince Gair as Ambassador to Ireland by Labor Prime Minister Gough Whitlam led to a dramatic slump in their vote, wiping the party out.

In the Senate he was considered to be a polished debater who only relied on a handful of brief notes to make a speech.

After his term as a Senator, Byrne returned to the law, returning to practice at the Bar in Queensland.
