= John Ryan (Australian politician) =

Australian politician

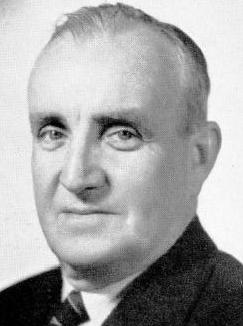

Senator for South Australia
- In office 22 February 1950 – 30 June 1959

Personal details
- Born: John Lattin; 1 December 1890 Adelaide, South Australia
- Died: 13 October 1974 (aged 83) Black Forest, South Australia
- Party: Labor

John Victor Ryan (born John Lattin; 1 December 1890 – 13 October 1974) was an Australian politician. Born in Adelaide, South Australia, he was educated at state schools before becoming a baker. He was secretary of the Baking Trades Employees' Union before becoming South Australian Labor Party Campaign Director 1928–1950. At the 1949 election he was elected to the Australian Senate as a Labor Senator for South Australia, commencing on 1 July 1950. He held the seat until his parliamentary retirement on 30 June 1959.

Ryan died in 1974.
