= Theo Nicholls =

Australian politician

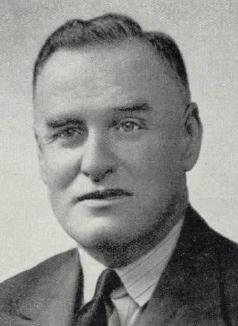

Senator for South Australia
- In office 1 July 1944 – 30 June 1968

Personal details
- Born: 12 April 1893 Wilmington, South Australia
- Died: 22 July 1977 (aged 84) Henley Beach, South Australia
- Party: Labor

Theophilus Martin "Theo" Nicholls (21 August 1894 – 22 July 1977) was an Australian politician. Born in Wilmington, South Australia, he received a primary education before becoming a wharf labourer. He served in the military from 1915 to 1917 and was secretary of several unions including the Manufacturing Grocers' Employees Federation and the Wool and Basil Workers Federation. He was active in a number of labour movement organisations, such as South Australian Trades and Labour Council, and was vice-president of the South Australian Labor Party. In 1943 he was elected to the Australian Senate as a Labor Senator for South Australia. He served as Chairman of Committees from 1946 to 1949. Nicholls remained in the Senate until his retirement in 1967.

Nicholls died in 1977, aged 84.

His nephew, Martin Nicholls, was a Labor MP for Bonython 1963–1977.
