= 1953 Australian Senate election =

1953 election for half the seats in the Australian Senate

Half-senate elections were held in Australia on 9 May 1953. 32 of the seats in the Senate were up for election. This was the first time a Senate election had been held without an accompanying election of the House of Representatives. The two election cycles fell out of synchronisation after the 1951 double dissolution. While the term of the House was not due to expire until 1954, a Senate election was due by 1 July 1953.

Although the Australian Labor Party won a majority of the contested seats, the Liberal-Country Coalition retained a majority of the overall seats in the upper house.

Senate (STV) – 1953–55—Turnout 94.93% (CV) – Informal 4.56%
Party	Votes	%	Swing	Seats won	Seats held	Change
Labor	2,323,968	50.61	+4.74	17	29	+1
Liberal–Country coalition	2,039,938	44.43	–5.27	15	31	–1
Liberal–Country joint ticket	1,214,285	26.45	–17.07	8	N/A	N/A
Liberal	825,653	17.98	+11.81	7	26	0
Country	N/A	N/A	N/A	N/A	5	–1
Communist	140,073	3.05	+0.94	0	0	0
Democratic	40,109	0.87	+0.87	0	0	0
Henry George Justice	13,590	0.30	+0.16	0	0	0
Tasmanian Labour Group	8,990	0.20	+0.20	0	0	0
Independents	24,921	0.54	+0.03	0	0	0
Total	4,591,589			32	60	

== See also ==
- Candidates of the Australian Senate election, 1953
- Members of the Australian Senate, 1953–1956
