= Frontbench of Ben Chifley =

The Frontbench of Ben Chifley was the federal Australian Labor Party frontbench from 13 July 1945 until Chifley's death on 13 June 1951. It was opposed by the Liberal-Country Coalition led by Robert Menzies.

Ben Chifley was appointed Prime Minister of Australia upon his election as leader of the Australian Labor Party on 12 July 1945 and his frontbench formed the Australian Government until Labor's defeat at the 1949 election. Chifley subsequently served as Leader of the Opposition until his death.

== First ministry (1945-1946) ==
Party	Minister	Portrait	Portfolio
Labor	Ben Chifley (1885–1951) MP for Macquarie (1940–1951)		Prime Minister; Leader of the Labor Party; Treasurer
Labor	Frank Forde (1890–1983) MP for Capricornia (1922–1946)		Deputy Leader of the Labor Party (to 28 September 1946); Minister for the Army; Minister for Defence (from 15 August 1946)
Labor	H. V. Evatt (1894–1965) MP for Barton (1940–1958)		Deputy Leader of the Labor Party (from 31 October 1946); Attorney-General; Minister for External Affairs
Labor	Jack Beasley (1895–1949) MP for West Sydney (1928–1946)		Minister for Defence (to 14 August 1946)
Labor	Norman Makin (1889–1982) MP for Hindmarsh (1919–1946)		Minister for the Navy (to 15 August 1946); Minister for Munitions (to 15 August 1946); Minister for Aircraft Production (to 15 August 1946)
Labor	Richard Keane (1881–1946) Senator for Victoria (1938–1946)		Minister for Trade and Customs (to 26 April 1946); Leader of the Government in the Senate (to 26 April 1946)
Labor	Jack Holloway (1875–1967) MP for Melbourne Ports (1931–1951)		Minister for Labour and National Service
Labor	Arthur Drakeford (1878–1957) MP for Maribyrnong (1934–1955)		Minister for Air; Minister for Civil Aviation; Minister for the Navy (from 15 August 1946)
Labor	William Scully (1883–1966) MP for Gwydir (1937–1949)		Minister for Commerce and Agriculture
Labor	Bill Ashley (1881–1958) Senator for New South Wales (1937–1958)		Minister for Supply and Shipping; Leader of the Government in the Senate (from 17 June 1946)
Labor	John Dedman (1896–1973) MP for Corio (1940–1949)		Minister in charge of the Council for Scientific and Industrial Research; Minister for Postwar Reconstruction; Minister for Trade and Customs (from 29 April 1946 to 18 June 1946); Minister for Munitions (from 15 August 1946); Minister for Aircraft Production (from 15 August 1946)
Labor	Joe Collings (1865–1955) Senator for Queensland (1932–1950)		Vice-President of the Executive Council
Labor	Eddie Ward (1899–1963) MP for East Sydney (1932–1963)		Minister for Transport; Minister for External Territories
Labor	James Fraser (1889–1961) Senator for Western Australia (1938–1959)		Minister for Health (to 18 June 1946); Minister for Social Services (to 18 June 1946); Minister for Trade and Customs (from 18 June 1946)
Labor	Charles Frost (1882–1964) MP for Franklin (1934–1946)		Minister for Repatriation
Labor	Bert Lazzarini (1884–1952) MP for Werriwa (1934–1952)		Minister for Home Security (to 1 February 1946); Minister for Works and Housing
Labor	Don Cameron (1878–1962) Senator for Victoria (1938–1962)		Postmaster-General
Labor	Arthur Calwell (1896–1973) MP for Melbourne (1940–1972)		Minister for Information; Minister for Immigration
Labor	Herbert Johnson (1889–1962) MP for Kalgoorlie (1940–1958)		Minister for the Interior; Minister assisting the Minister for Works and Housing
Labor	Nick McKenna (1895–1974) Senator for Tasmania (1944–1968) (in Ministry from 18 June 1946)		Minister for Health (from 18 June 1946); Minister for Social Services (from 18 June 1946)

== Second ministry (1946-1949) ==
Party	Minister	Portrait	Portfolio
Labor	Ben Chifley (1885–1951) MP for Macquarie (1940–1951)		Prime Minister; Leader of the Labor Party; Treasurer
Labor	H. V. Evatt (1894–1965) MP for Barton (1940–1958)		Deputy Leader of the Labor Party; Attorney-General; Minister for External Affairs
Labor	Jack Holloway (1875–1967) MP for Melbourne Ports (1931–1951)		Minister for Labour and National Service
Labor	Arthur Drakeford (1878–1957) MP for Maribyrnong (1934–1955)		Minister for Air; Minister for Civil Aviation
Labor	William Scully (1883–1966) MP for Gwydir (1937–1949)		Vice-President of the Executive Council
Labor	Bill Ashley (1881–1958) Senator for New South Wales (1937–1958)		Minister for Supply and Shipping (to 6 April 1948); Minister for Shipping and Fuel (from 6 April 1948); Leader of the Government in the Senate
Labor	John Dedman (1896–1973) MP for Corio (1940–1949)		Minister for Defence; Minister for Postwar Reconstruction; Minister in charge of the Council for Scientific and Industrial Research
Labor	Eddie Ward (1899–1963) MP for East Sydney (1932–1963)		Minister for Transport; Minister for External Territories
Labor	Don Cameron (1878–1962) Senator for Victoria (1938–1962)		Postmaster-General
Labor	Arthur Calwell (1896–1973) MP for Melbourne (1940–1972)		Minister for Information; Minister for Immigration
Labor	Herbert Johnson (1889–1962) MP for Kalgoorlie (1940–1958)		Minister for the Interior
Labor	Nick McKenna (1895–1974) Senator for Tasmania (1944–1968)		Minister for Health; Minister for Social Services
Labor	Reg Pollard (1894–1981) MP for Ballaarat (1937–1949)		Minister for Commerce and Agriculture
Labor	Nelson Lemmon (1908–1989) MP for Forrest (1943–1949)		Minister for Works and Housing
Labor	John Armstrong (1908–1977) Senator for New South Wales (1938–1962)		Minister for Munitions (to 6 April 1948); Minister for Supply and Development (from 6 April 1948)
Labor	Cyril Chambers (1898–1975) MP for Adelaide (1943–1958)		Minister for the Army
Labor	Ben Courtice (1881–1972) Senator for Queensland (1937–1962)		Minister for Trade and Customs
Labor	Bill Riordan (1908–1973) MP for Kennedy (1936–1966)		Minister for the Navy
Labor	Claude Barnard (1890–1957) MP for Bass (1934–1949)		Minister for Repatriation

== Caucus Executive (1950-1951) ==
The following were members of the ALP Caucus Executive from 21 February 1950 to 12 June 1951:

Party	Executive Member	Portrait	Role
Labor	Ben Chifley (1885–1951) MP for Macquarie (1940–1951)		Leader of the Opposition; Leader of the Labor Party
Labor	H. V. Evatt (1894–1965) MP for Barton (1940–1958)		Deputy Leader of the Opposition; Deputy Leader of the Labor Party
Labor	Bill Ashley (1881–1958) Senator for New South Wales (1937–1958)		Leader of the Opposition in the Senate
Labor	Nick McKenna (1895–1974) Senator for Tasmania (1944–1968)		Deputy Leader of the Opposition in the Senate
Labor	Kim Beazley (1917–2007) MP for Fremantle (1945–1977)		Member of the Caucus Executive
Labor	Tom Burke (1910–1973) MP for Perth (1943–1955)		Member of the Caucus Executive
Labor	Arthur Calwell (1896–1973) MP for Melbourne (1940–1972)		Member of the Caucus Executive
Labor	Cyril Chambers (1897–1975) MP for Adelaide (1943–1958)		Member of the Caucus Executive
Labor	Percy Clarey (1890–1960) MP for Bendigo (1949–1960)		Member of the Caucus Executive
Labor	Joe Cooke (1904–1981) Senator for Western Australia (1947–1951)		Member of the Caucus Executive
Labor	Ben Courtice (1881–1972) Senator for Queensland (1937–1962)		Member of the Caucus Executive
Labor	Reg Pollard (1894–1981) MP for Lalor (1949–1966)		Member of the Caucus Executive
Labor	Sol Rosevear (1892–1953) MP for Dalley (1931–1953)		Member of the Caucus Executive
Labor	Eddie Ward (1899–1963) MP for East Sydney (1932–1963)		Member of the Caucus Executive

== Caucus Executive (June 1951) ==
The following were members of the ALP Caucus Executive from 12 June 1951 to 20 June 1951:

Party	Executive Member	Portrait	Role
Labor	Ben Chifley (1885–1951) MP for Macquarie (1940–1951)		Leader of the Opposition (to 13 June 1951); Leader of the Labor Party (to 13 June 1951)
Labor	H. V. Evatt (1894–1965) MP for Barton (1940–1958)		Deputy Leader of the Opposition; Deputy Leader of the Labor Party
Labor	Nick McKenna (1895–1974) Senator for Tasmania (1944–1968)		Leader of the Opposition in the Senate
Labor	John Armstrong (1908–1977) Senator for Victoria (1938–1962)		Deputy Leader of the Opposition in the Senate
Labor	Tom Burke (1910–1973) MP for Perth (1943–1955)		Member of the Caucus Executive
Labor	Arthur Calwell (1896–1973) MP for Melbourne (1940–1972)		Member of the Caucus Executive
Labor	Cyril Chambers (1897–1975) MP for Adelaide (1943–1958)		Member of the Caucus Executive
Labor	Percy Clarey (1890–1960) MP for Bendigo (1949–1960)		Member of the Caucus Executive
Labor	Ben Courtice (1881–1972) Senator for Queensland (1937–1962)		Member of the Caucus Executive
Labor	Allan Fraser (1902–1977) MP for Eden-Monaro (1943–1966)		Member of the Caucus Executive
Labor	Les Haylen (1898–1977) MP for Parkes (1943–1963)		Member of the Caucus Executive
Labor	Reg Pollard (1894–1981) MP for Lalor (1949–1966)		Member of the Caucus Executive
Labor	Sol Rosevear (1892–1953) MP for Dalley (1931–1953)		Member of the Caucus Executive (to 21 March 1953)
Labor	Eddie Ward (1899–1963) MP for East Sydney (1932–1963)		Member of the Caucus Executive

== See also ==
- Frontbench of John Curtin
- Frontbench of H. V. Evatt
- Fourth Menzies Ministry
- Fifth Menzies Ministry
