= Frontbench of H. V. Evatt =

The Frontbench of H. V. Evatt was the opposition Australian Labor Party frontbench of Australia from 20 June 1951 to 9 February 1960, opposing the Liberal-Country Coalition government led by Robert Menzies.

H. V. Evatt became Leader of the Opposition upon his election as leader of the Australian Labor Party on 20 June 1951, and headed up the Australian Labor Party Caucus Executive until 1960.

== Caucus Executive (1951-1954) ==
The following were members of the ALP Caucus Executive from 20 June 1951 to 3 August 1954:

Party	Executive Member	Portrait	Role
Labor	H. V. Evatt (1894–1965) MP for Barton (1940–1958)		Leader of the Opposition; Leader of the Labor Party
Labor	Arthur Calwell (1896–1973) MP for Melbourne (1940–1972)		Deputy Leader of the Opposition; Deputy Leader of the Labor Party
Labor	Nick McKenna (1895–1974) Senator for Tasmania (1944–1968)		Leader of the Opposition in the Senate
Labor	John Armstrong (1908–1977) Senator for Victoria (1938–1962)		Deputy Leader of the Opposition in the Senate
Labor	James Arnold (1902–1967) Senator for New South Wales (1941–1965)		Member of the Caucus Executive
Labor	Tom Burke (1910–1973) MP for Perth (1943–1955)		Member of the Caucus Executive
Labor	Cyril Chambers (1897–1975) MP for Adelaide (1943–1958)		Member of the Caucus Executive
Labor	Percy Clarey (1890–1960) MP for Bendigo (1949–1960)		Member of the Caucus Executive
Labor	Ben Courtice (1881–1972) Senator for Queensland (1937–1962)		Member of the Caucus Executive
Labor	Allan Fraser (1902–1977) MP for Eden-Monaro (1943–1966)		Member of the Caucus Executive
Labor	Les Haylen (1898–1977) MP for Parkes (1943–1963)		Member of the Caucus Executive
Labor	Reg Pollard (1894–1981) MP for Lalor (1949–1966)		Member of the Caucus Executive
Labor	Sol Rosevear (1892–1953) MP for Dalley (1931–1953)		Member of the Caucus Executive (to 21 March 1953)
Labor	Eddie Ward (1899–1963) MP for East Sydney (1932–1963)		Member of the Caucus Executive
Labor	Eli Harrison (1903–1976) MP for Blaxland (1949–1969) (in Caucus Executive from 9 September 1953)		Member of the Caucus Executive (from 9 September 1953)

== Caucus Executive (1954-1956) ==
The following were members of the ALP Caucus Executive from 3 August 1954 to 13 February 1956:

Party	Executive Member	Portrait	Role
Labor	H. V. Evatt (1894–1965) MP for Barton (1940–1958)		Leader of the Opposition; Leader of the Labor Party
Labor	Arthur Calwell (1896–1973) MP for Melbourne (1940–1972)		Deputy Leader of the Opposition; Deputy Leader of the Labor Party
Labor	Nick McKenna (1895–1974) Senator for Tasmania (1944–1968)		Leader of the Opposition in the Senate
Labor	John Armstrong (1908–1977) Senator for Victoria (1938–1962)		Deputy Leader of the Opposition in the Senate
Labor	Stan Amour (1900–1979) Senator for New South Wales (1938–1965)		Member of the Caucus Executive
Labor	James Arnold (1902–1967) Senator for New South Wales (1941–1965)		Member of the Caucus Executive
Labor	Cyril Chambers (1897–1975) MP for Adelaide (1943–1958)		Member of the Caucus Executive
Labor	Percy Clarey (1890–1960) MP for Bendigo (1949–1960)		Member of the Caucus Executive
Labor	Allan Fraser (1902–1977) MP for Eden-Monaro (1943–1966)		Member of the Caucus Executive
Labor	Eli Harrison (1903–1976) MP for Blaxland (1949–1969)		Member of the Caucus Executive
Labor	Les Haylen (1898–1977) MP for Parkes (1943–1963)		Member of the Caucus Executive
Labor	Reg Pollard (1894–1981) MP for Lalor (1949–1966)		Member of the Caucus Executive
Labor	Dorothy Tangney (1907–1985) Senator for Western Australia (1943–1968)		Member of the Caucus Executive
Labor	Eddie Ward (1899–1963) MP for East Sydney (1932–1963)		Member of the Caucus Executive

== Caucus Executive (1956-1959) ==
The following were members of the ALP Caucus Executive from 13 February 1956 to 16 February 1959:

Party	Executive Member	Portrait	Role
Labor	H. V. Evatt (1894–1965) MP for Barton (1940–1958)		Leader of the Opposition; Leader of the Labor Party
Labor	Arthur Calwell (1896–1973) MP for Melbourne (1940–1972)		Deputy Leader of the Opposition; Deputy Leader of the Labor Party
Labor	Nick McKenna (1895–1974) Senator for Tasmania (1944–1968)		Leader of the Opposition in the Senate
Labor	Pat Kennelly (1900–1981) Senator for Victoria (1953–1971)		Deputy Leader of the Opposition in the Senate
Labor	Clyde Cameron (1913–2008) MP for Hindmarsh (1949–1980)		Member of the Caucus Executive
Labor	Cyril Chambers (1897–1975) MP for Adelaide (1943–1958)		Member of the Caucus Executive
Labor	Percy Clarey (1890–1960) MP for Bendigo (1949–1960)		Member of the Caucus Executive
Labor	Ben Courtice (1881–1972) Senator for Queensland (1937–1962)		Member of the Caucus Executive
Labor	Frank Crean (1916–2008) MP for Melbourne Ports (1951–1977)		Member of the Caucus Executive
Labor	Bill Edmonds (1903–1968) MP for Herbert (1946–1958)		Member of the Caucus Executive
Labor	Allan Fraser (1902–1977) MP for Eden-Monaro (1943–1966)		Member of the Caucus Executive
Labor	Les Haylen (1898–1977) MP for Parkes (1943–1963)		Member of the Caucus Executive
Labor	Reg Pollard (1894–1981) MP for Lalor (1949–1966)		Member of the Caucus Executive
Labor	Dorothy Tangney (1907–1985) Senator for Western Australia (1943–1968)		Member of the Caucus Executive
Labor	Eddie Ward (1899–1963) MP for East Sydney (1932–1963)		Member of the Caucus Executive

== Caucus Executive (1959-1960) ==
The following were members of the ALP Caucus Executive from 16 February 1959 to 9 February 1960:

Party	Executive Member	Portrait	Role
Labor	H. V. Evatt (1894–1965) MP for Hunter (1958–1960)		Leader of the Opposition; Leader of the Labor Party
Labor	Arthur Calwell (1896–1973) MP for Melbourne (1940–1972)		Deputy Leader of the Opposition; Deputy Leader of the Labor Party
Labor	Nick McKenna (1895–1974) Senator for Tasmania (1944–1968)		Leader of the Opposition in the Senate
Labor	Pat Kennelly (1900–1981) Senator for Victoria (1953–1971)		Deputy Leader of the Opposition in the Senate
Labor	Lance Barnard (1919–1997) MP for Bass (1954–1975)		Member of the Caucus Executive
Labor	Clyde Cameron (1913–2008) MP for Hindmarsh (1949–1980)		Member of the Caucus Executive
Labor	Percy Clarey (1890–1960) MP for Bendigo (1949–1960)		Member of the Caucus Executive
Labor	Ben Courtice (1881–1972) Senator for Queensland (1937–1962)		Member of the Caucus Executive
Labor	Frank Crean (1916–2008) MP for Melbourne Ports (1951–1977)		Member of the Caucus Executive
Labor	Allan Fraser (1902–1977) MP for Eden-Monaro (1943–1966)		Member of the Caucus Executive
Labor	Les Haylen (1898–1977) MP for Parkes (1943–1963)		Member of the Caucus Executive
Labor	Reg Pollard (1894–1981) MP for Lalor (1949–1966)		Member of the Caucus Executive
Labor	Eddie Ward (1899–1963) MP for East Sydney (1932–1963)		Member of the Caucus Executive
Labor	Gough Whitlam (1916–2014) MP for Werriwa (1952–1978)		Member of the Caucus Executive

== See also ==
- Frontbench of Ben Chifley
- Frontbench of Arthur Calwell
- Menzies government (1949–1966)
  - Fifth ministry
  - Sixth ministry
  - Seventh ministry
  - Eighth ministry
