= Frontbench of Arthur Calwell =

The Frontbench of Arthur Calwell was the opposition Australian Labor Party frontbench of Australia from 7 March 1960 to 8 February 1967, opposing the Liberal-Country Coalition government.

Arthur Calwell became Leader of the Opposition upon his election as leader of the Australian Labor Party on 7 March 1960, and headed up the Australian Labor Party Caucus Executive until 1967.

== Caucus Executive (1960-1962) ==
The following were members of the ALP Caucus Executive from 7 March 1960 to 19 February 1962:

Party	Executive Member	Portrait	Role
Labor	Arthur Calwell (1896–1973) MP for Melbourne (1940–1972)		Leader of the Opposition; Leader of the Labor Party
Labor	Gough Whitlam (1916–2014) MP for Werriwa (1952–1978)		Deputy Leader of the Opposition; Deputy Leader of the Labor Party
Labor	Nick McKenna (1895–1974) Senator for Tasmania (1944–1968)		Leader of the Opposition in the Senate
Labor	Pat Kennelly (1900–1981) Senator for Victoria (1953–1971)		Deputy Leader of the Opposition in the Senate
Labor	Lance Barnard (1919–1997) MP for Bass (1954–1975)		Member of the Caucus Executive
Labor	Clyde Cameron (1913–2008) MP for Hindmarsh (1949–1980)		Member of the Caucus Executive
Labor	Percy Clarey (1890–1960) MP for Bendigo (1949–1960)		Member of the Caucus Executive (to 17 May 1960)
Labor	Ben Courtice (1881–1972) Senator for Queensland (1937–1962)		Member of the Caucus Executive
Labor	Frank Crean (1916–2008) MP for Melbourne Ports (1951–1977)		Member of the Caucus Executive
Labor	Allan Fraser (1902–1977) MP for Eden-Monaro (1943–1966)		Member of the Caucus Executive
Labor	Eli Harrison (1903–1976) MP for Blaxland (1949–1969)		Member of the Caucus Executive
Labor	Les Haylen (1898–1977) MP for Parkes (1943–1963)		Member of the Caucus Executive
Labor	Reg Pollard (1894–1981) MP for Lalor (1949–1966)		Member of the Caucus Executive
Labor	Eddie Ward (1899–1963) MP for East Sydney (1932–1963)		Member of the Caucus Executive
Labor	Jim Cairns (1914–2003) MP for Yarra (1955–1969) (in Caucus Executive from 17 August 1960)		Member of the Caucus Executive (from 17 August 1960)

== Caucus Executive (1962-1964) ==
The following were members of the ALP Caucus Executive from 19 February 1962 to 24 February 1964:

Party	Executive Member	Portrait	Role
Labor	Arthur Calwell (1896–1973) MP for Melbourne (1940–1972)		Leader of the Opposition; Leader of the Labor Party
Labor	Gough Whitlam (1916–2014) MP for Werriwa (1952–1978)		Deputy Leader of the Opposition; Deputy Leader of the Labor Party
Labor	Nick McKenna (1895–1974) Senator for Tasmania (1944–1968)		Leader of the Opposition in the Senate
Labor	Pat Kennelly (1900–1981) Senator for Victoria (1953–1971)		Deputy Leader of the Opposition in the Senate
Labor	Kim Beazley (1917–2007) MP for Fremantle (1945–1977)		Member of the Caucus Executive
Labor	Clyde Cameron (1913–2008) MP for Hindmarsh (1949–1980)		Member of the Caucus Executive
Labor	Frank Crean (1916–2008) MP for Melbourne Ports (1951–1977)		Member of the Caucus Executive
Labor	Allan Fraser (1902–1977) MP for Eden-Monaro (1943–1966)		Member of the Caucus Executive
Labor	Eli Harrison (1903–1976) MP for Blaxland (1949–1969)		Member of the Caucus Executive
Labor	Les Haylen (1898–1977) MP for Parkes (1943–1963)		Member of the Caucus Executive
Labor	Tony Luchetti (1904–1984) MP for Macquarie (1951–1975)		Member of the Caucus Executive
Labor	Reg Pollard (1894–1981) MP for Lalor (1949–1966)		Member of the Caucus Executive
Labor	Bill Riordan (1908–1973) MP for Kennedy (1936–1966)		Member of the Caucus Executive
Labor	Eddie Ward (1899–1963) MP for East Sydney (1932–1963)		Member of the Caucus Executive (to 31 July 1963)
Labor	Fred Daly (1912–1995) MP for Grayndler (1949–1975) (in Caucus Executive from 21 August 1963)		Member of the Caucus Executive (from 21 August 1963)

== Caucus Executive (1964-1967) ==
The following were members of the ALP Caucus Executive from 24 February 1964 to 8 February 1967:

Party	Executive Member	Portrait	Role
Labor	Arthur Calwell (1896–1973) MP for Melbourne (1940–1972)		Leader of the Opposition; Leader of the Labor Party
Labor	Gough Whitlam (1916–2014) MP for Werriwa (1952–1978)		Deputy Leader of the Opposition; Deputy Leader of the Labor Party
Labor	Nick McKenna (1895–1974) Senator for Tasmania (1944–1968)		Leader of the Opposition in the Senate (to 17 August 1966)
Labor	Pat Kennelly (1900–1981) Senator for Victoria (1953–1971)		Deputy Leader of the Opposition in the Senate
Labor	Kim Beazley (1917–2007) MP for Fremantle (1945–1977)		Member of the Caucus Executive
Labor	Jim Cairns (1914–2003) MP for Yarra (1955–1969)		Member of the Caucus Executive
Labor	Clyde Cameron (1913–2008) MP for Hindmarsh (1949–1980)		Member of the Caucus Executive
Labor	Frank Crean (1916–2008) MP for Melbourne Ports (1951–1977)		Member of the Caucus Executive
Labor	Fred Daly (1912–1995) MP for Grayndler (1949–1975)		Member of the Caucus Executive
Labor	Allan Fraser (1902–1977) MP for Eden-Monaro (1943–1966)		Member of the Caucus Executive
Labor	Pat Galvin (1911–1980) MP for Kingston (1951–1966)		Member of the Caucus Executive
Labor	Tony Luchetti (1904–1984) MP for Macquarie (1951–1975)		Member of the Caucus Executive
Labor	Reg Pollard (1894–1981) MP for Lalor (1949–1966)		Member of the Caucus Executive
Labor	Harry Webb (1908–2000) MP for Stirling (1961–1972)		Member of the Caucus Executive
Labor	Don Willesee (1916–2003) Senator for Western Australia (1950–1975) (in Caucus Executive from 17 August 1966)		Leader of the Opposition in the Senate (from 17 August 1966)

== See also ==
- Frontbench of H. V. Evatt
- Shadow Ministry of Gough Whitlam (1967–72)
- Eighth Menzies Ministry
- Ninth Menzies Ministry
- Tenth Menzies Ministry
- Second Gorton Ministry
- First Holt Ministry
- Second Holt Ministry
