= Frontbench of John Curtin =

The Frontbench of John Curtin was the federal Australian Labor Party frontbench from October 1, 1935 until Curtin's death on July 5, 1945. It was opposed by the UAP-Country Coalition.

John Curtin became Leader of the Opposition upon his election as leader of the Australian Labor Party on October 1, 1935. His frontbench subsequently formed the Australian Government from 1941 until his death.

== Caucus Executive ==
=== 1935-1937 ===
The following were members of the ALP Caucus Executive from October 1, 1935 to October 29, 1937:

- John Curtin MP - Leader of the Opposition and Leader of the Labor Party
- Hon. Frank Forde MP - Deputy Leader of the Opposition and Deputy Leader of the Labor Party
- Senator Joe Collings - Leader of the Opposition in the Senate
- Senator Gordon Brown - Deputy Leader of the Opposition in the Senate
- Hon Norman Makin MP - Secretary
- Hon Jack Holloway MP
- Darby Riordan MP (to October 15, 1936)

=== 1937-1940 ===
The following were members of the ALP Caucus Executive from October 9, 1937 to October 14, 1940:

- John Curtin MP - Leader of the Opposition and Leader of the Labor Party
- Hon. Frank Forde MP - Deputy Leader of the Opposition and Deputy Leader of the Labor Party
- Senator Joe Collings - Leader of the Opposition in the Senate
- Senator Gordon Brown - Deputy Leader of the Opposition in the Senate (to September 20, 1938)
- Senator Richard Keane - Deputy Leader of the Opposition in the Senate (from September 20, 1938)
- Hon Norman Makin MP - Secretary
- Frank Brennan MP
- Albert Green MP (to October 2, 1940)
- Hon Jack Holloway MP
- Bert Lazzarini MP
- George Martens MP
- Eddie Ward MP

=== 1940-1941 ===
The following were members of the ALP Caucus Executive from October 14, 1940 to October 7, 1941:

- John Curtin MP - Leader of the Opposition and Leader of the Labor Party
- Hon. Frank Forde MP - Deputy Leader of the Opposition and Deputy Leader of the Labor Party
- Senator Joe Collings - Leader of the Opposition in the Senate
- Senator James Cunningham - Deputy Leader of the Opposition in the Senate
- Hon Norman Makin MP - Secretary
- Hon. Ben Chifley MP
- Charles Frost MP
- Arthur Drakeford MP
- Dr H. V. Evatt QC MP
- Hon Jack Holloway MP
- Bert Lazzarini MP

== First ministry (1941-1943) ==
Party	Minister	Portrait	Portfolio
Labor	John Curtin (1885–1945) MP for Fremantle (1934–1945)		Prime Minister; Leader of the Labor Party; Minister for Defence Co-ordination (to 14 April 1942); Minister for Defence (from 14 April 1942)
Labor	Frank Forde (1890–1983) MP for Capricornia (1922–1946)		Deputy Leader of the Labor Party; Minister for the Army
Labor	Ben Chifley (1885–1951) MP for Macquarie (1940–1951)		Treasurer; Minister for Postwar Reconstruction (from 22 December 1942)
Labor	H. V. Evatt (1894–1965) MP for Barton (1940–1958)		Attorney-General; Minister for External Affairs
Labor	Jack Beasley (1895–1949) MP for West Sydney (1928–1946)		Minister for Supply and Development (to 17 October 1942); Minister for Supply and Shipping (from 17 October 1942)
Labor	Joe Collings (1865–1955) Senator for Queensland (1932–1950)		Minister for the Interior; Leader of the Government in the Senate (to 20 September 1943)
Labor	Norman Makin (1889–1982) MP for Hindmarsh (1919–1946)		Minister for the Navy; Minister for Munitions
Labor	Jack Holloway (1875–1967) MP for Melbourne Ports (1931–1951)		Minister for Health; Minister for Social Services; Minister assisting the Minister for Munitions (from 21 February 1942)
Labor	Richard Keane (1881–1946) Senator for Victoria (1938–1946)		Minister for Trade and Customs; Vice-President of the Executive Council; Leader of the Government in the Senate (from 20 September 1943)
Labor	Arthur Drakeford (1878–1957) MP for Maribyrnong (1934–1955)		Minister for Air; Minister for Civil Aviation
Labor	William Scully (1883–1966) MP for Gwydir (1937–1949)		Minister for Commerce (to 22 December 1942); Minister for Commerce and Agriculture (from 22 December 1942)
Labor	Bill Ashley (1881–1958) Senator for New South Wales (1937–1958)		Postmaster-General; Minister for Information
Labor	Eddie Ward (1899–1963) MP for East Sydney (1932–1963)		Minister for Labour and National Service
Labor	George Lawson (1880–1966) MP for Brisbane (1931–1961)		Minister for Transport; Minister assisting the Postmaster-General
Labor	Charles Frost (1882–1964) MP for Franklin (1934–1946)		Minister for Repatriation; Minister in charge of War Service Homes
Labor	John Dedman (1896–1973) MP for Corio (1940–1949)		Minister for War Organisation of Industry; Minister in charge of the Council for Scientific and Industrial Research
Labor	Bert Lazzarini (1884–1952) MP for Werriwa (1934–1952)		Minister for Home Security; Minister assisting the Treasurer
Labor	James Fraser (1889–1961) Senator for Western Australia (1938–1959)		Minister for External Territories; Minister assisting the Minister for Commerce (to 17 October 1942); Minister assisting the Minister for the Army (from 21 February 1942); Minister assisting the Minister for Supply and Shipping (from 17 October 1942)
Labor	Don Cameron (1878–1962) Senator for Victoria (1938–1962)		Minister for Aircraft Production; Minister assisting the Minister for Munitions (to 21 February 1942)

== Second ministry (1943-1945) ==
Party	Minister	Portrait	Portfolio
Labor	John Curtin (1885–1945) MP for Fremantle (1934–1945)		Prime Minister; Leader of the Labor Party; Minister for Defence
Labor	Frank Forde (1890–1983) MP for Capricornia (1922–1946)		Deputy Leader of the Labor Party; Minister for the Army
Labor	Ben Chifley (1885–1951) MP for Macquarie (1940–1951)		Treasurer; Minister for Postwar Reconstruction (to 2 February 1945)
Labor	H. V. Evatt (1894–1965) MP for Barton (1940–1958)		Attorney-General; Minister for External Affairs
Labor	Jack Beasley (1895–1949) MP for West Sydney (1928–1946)		Minister for Supply and Shipping (to 2 February 1945); Vice-President of the Executive Council (from 2 February 1945)
Labor	Norman Makin (1889–1982) MP for Hindmarsh (1919–1946)		Minister for the Navy; Minister for Munitions; Minister for Aircraft Production (from 2 February 1945)
Labor	Richard Keane (1881–1946) Senator for Victoria (1938–1946)		Minister for Trade and Customs; Leader of the Government in the Senate
Labor	Jack Holloway (1875–1967) MP for Melbourne Ports (1931–1951)		Minister for Labour and National Service
Labor	Arthur Drakeford (1878–1957) MP for Maribyrnong (1934–1955)		Minister for Air; Minister for Civil Aviation
Labor	William Scully (1883–1966) MP for Gwydir (1937–1949)		Minister for Commerce and Agriculture
Labor	Bill Ashley (1881–1958) Senator for New South Wales (1937–1958)		Postmaster-General (to 2 February 1945); Vice-President of the Executive Council (to 2 February 1945); Minister for Supply and Shipping (from 2 February 1945)
Labor	John Dedman (1896–1973) MP for Corio (1940–1949)		Minister in charge of the Council for Scientific and Industrial Research; Minister for War Organisation (to 19 February 1945); Minister for Postwar Reconstruction (from 2 February 1945)
Labor	Joe Collings (1865–1955) Senator for Queensland (1932–1950)		Minister for the Interior
Labor	Eddie Ward (1899–1963) MP for East Sydney (1932–1963)		Minister for Transport; Minister for External Territories
Labor	James Fraser (1889–1961) Senator for Western Australia (1938–1959)		Minister for Health; Minister for Social Services
Labor	Charles Frost (1882–1964) MP for Franklin (1934–1946)		Minister for Repatriation; Minister in charge of War Service Homes
Labor	Bert Lazzarini (1884–1952) MP for Werriwa (1934–1952)		Minister for Home Security; Minister for Works (from 2 February 1945)
Labor	Don Cameron (1878–1962) Senator for Victoria (1938–1962)		Minister for Aircraft Production (to 2 February 1945); Postmaster-General (from 2 February 1945)
Labor	Arthur Calwell (1896–1973) MP for Melbourne (1940–1972)		Minister for Information

== See also ==
- Frontbench of James Scullin
- Frontbench of Ben Chifley
- Third Lyons Ministry
- Fourth Lyons Ministry
- Page Ministry
- First Menzies Ministry
- Second Menzies Ministry
- Third Menzies Ministry
- Fadden Ministry
