= Members of the Australian Senate, 1941–1944 =

Senate composition at 1 July 1941
Coalition (19) - (1 seat majority) (Note: The minority government lost the confidence of the House of Representatives in October 1941 and Labor formed a minority government.)
United Australia Party (16)
Country Party (3) (Note: At the August 1943 election Country Party Senator Charles Latham was defeated for a casual vacancy by Labor candidate Dorothy Tangney.)

Labor (17) - (2 seat minority)

Changes in composition

This is a list of members of the Australian Senate from 1941 to 1944. Half of its members were elected at the 23 October 1937 election and had terms starting on 1 July 1938 and finishing on 30 June 1944; the other half were elected at the 21 September 1940 election and had terms starting on 1 July 1941 and finishing on 30 June 1947. The process for filling casual vacancies was complex. While senators were elected for a six-year term, people appointed to a casual vacancy only held office until the earlier of the next election for the House of Representatives or the Senate.

The government changed during the Senate term as the minority government, a Coalition of the Country Party led by Prime Minister of Australia Arthur Fadden and the United Australia Party led by Billy Hughes lost the confidence of the House of Representatives in October 1941. The Australian Labor Party, led by John Curtin, formed a minority government.

Senator	Party	State	Term ending	Years in office
Stan Amour	Labor	New South Wales	1944	1938–1965
John Armstrong	Labor	New South Wales	1944	1938–1962
James Arnold	Labor	New South Wales	1947	1941–1965
Tom Arthur	Labor	New South Wales	1944	1938–1944
Bill Ashley	Labor	New South Wales	1947	1938–1962
Bill Aylett	Labor	Tasmania	1944	1938–1965
Charles Brand	United Australia	Victoria	1947	1935–1947
Gordon Brown	Labor	Queensland	1944	1932–1965
Don Cameron	Labor	Victoria	1944	1938–1962
Robert Clothier	Labor	Western Australia	1944	1943–1968
Herbert Collett	United Australia	Western Australia	1947	1933–1947
Joe Collings	Labor	Queensland	1944	1932–1950
Walter Cooper	Country	Queensland	1947	1928–1932, 1935–1968
Ben Courtice	Labor	Queensland	1944	1937–1962
Thomas Crawford (Note: Father of the Senate)	United Australia	Queensland	1947	1917–1947
James Cunningham (Note: Labor Senator James Cunningham died on 4 July 1943; Labor member Richard Nash was elected at the August 1943 election to fill the resulting vacancy, expiring on 30 June 1944.)	Labor	Western Australia	1944	1937–1943
Richard Darcey	Labor	Tasmania	1944	1938–1944
Harry Foll	United Australia	Queensland	1947	1917–1947
James Fraser	Labor	Western Australia	1944	1938–1959
William Gibson	Country	Victoria	1947	1935–1947
John Hayes	United Australia	Tasmania	1947	1923–1947
Herbert Hays	United Australia	Tasmania	1947	1923–1947
Bertie Johnston (Note: Country Party Senator Bertie Johnston died on 6 September 1942; Country Party state politician Charles Latham was appointed to replace him on 8 October, with his term expiring at the August 1943 election, when he was defeated by Labor candidate Dorothy Tangney for the vacancy, expiring on 30 June 1947.)	Country	Western Australia	1947	1929–1942
Richard Keane	Labor	Victoria	1944	1938–1946
Charles Lamp	Labor	Tasmania	1944	1938–1950
William Large	Labor	New South Wales	1947	1941–1951
Charles Latham	Country	Western Australia	1943 (Note: Appointed to a casual vacancy and only held office until the earlier of the next election for the House of Representatives or the Senate.)	1942–1943
John Leckie	United Australia	Victoria	1947	1935–1947
Allan MacDonald	United Australia	Western Australia	1947	1935–1947
Philip McBride	United Australia	South Australia	1944	1937–1944
Alexander McLachlan	United Australia	South Australia	1944	1926–1944
James McLachlan	United Australia	South Australia	1947	1935–1947
George McLeay	United Australia	South Australia	1947	1935–1947, 1950–1955
Richard Nash	Labor	Western Australia	1944	1943–1951
Burford Sampson	United Australia	Tasmania	1947	1925–1938, 1941–1947
John Spicer	United Australia	Victoria	1944	1940–1944, 1950–1956
Dorothy Tangney (Note: First woman in the Senate)	Labor	Western Australia	1947	1943–1968
Oliver Uppill	United Australia	South Australia	1947	1935–1944
Keith Wilson	United Australia	South Australia	1944	1938–1944
