= 1956 Australian Labor Party leadership spill =

1956 Australian Labor Party Leadership spill
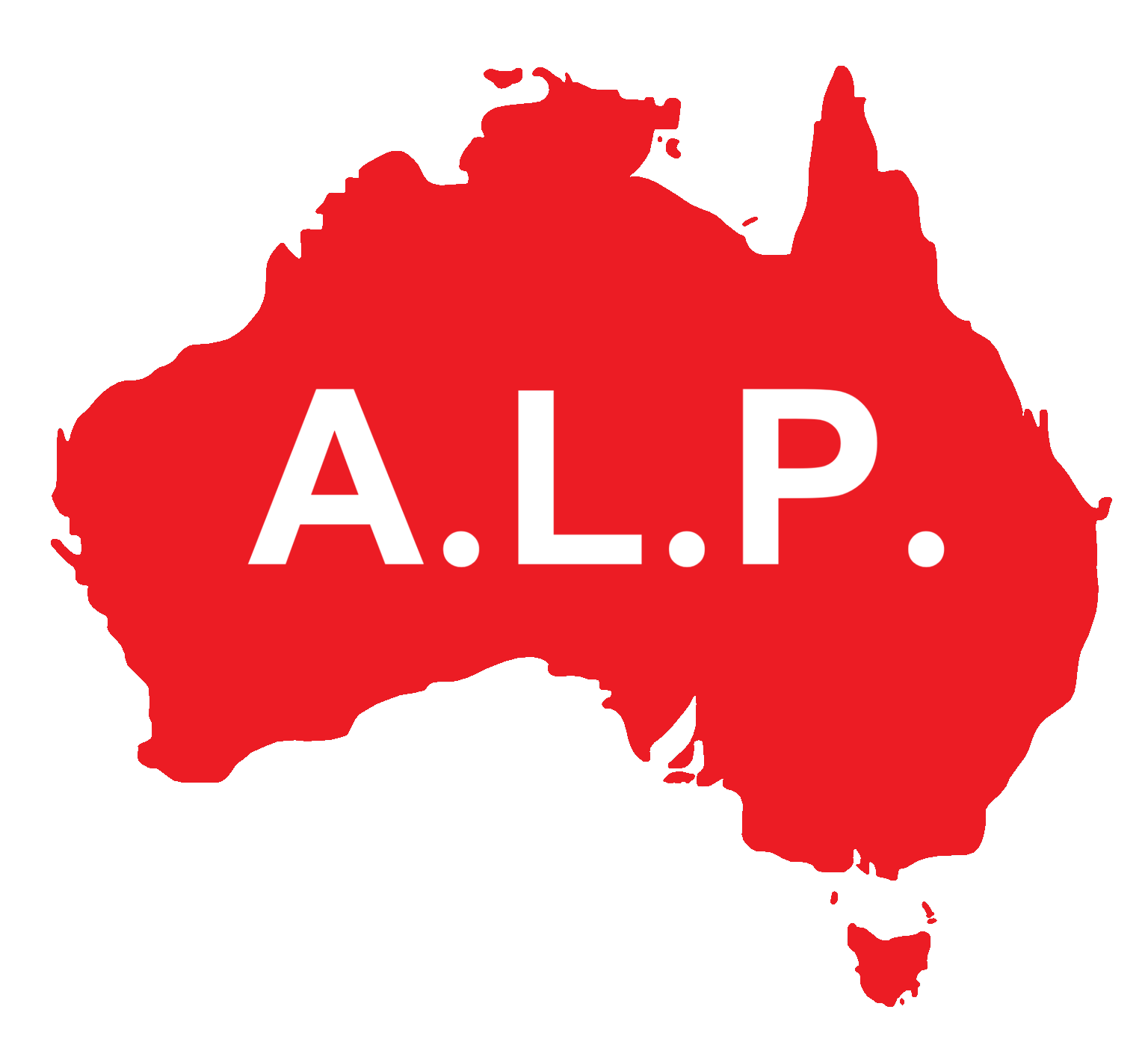
- 16 February 1956
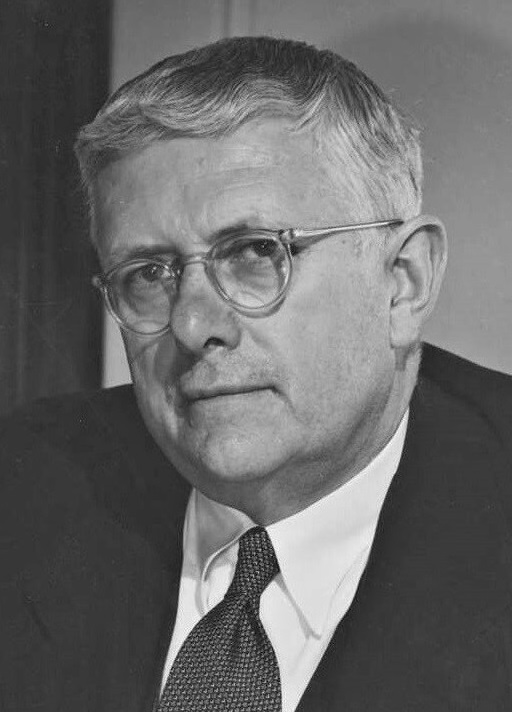

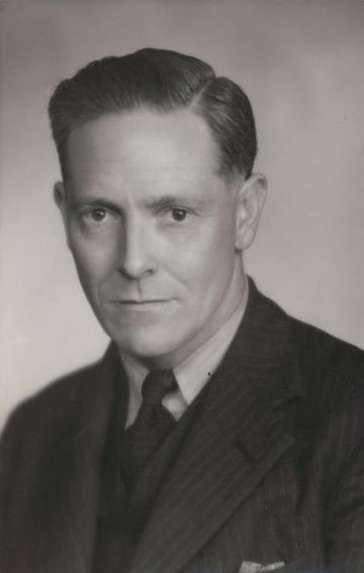
Candidate	H. V. Evatt	Allan Fraser
Caucus vote	58 (74.4%)	20 (25.6%)
Leader before election
H. V. Evatt
Elected Leader
H. V. Evatt

A leadership spill of the Australian Labor Party (ALP), then the opposition party in the Parliament of Australia, was held on 16 February 1956.

== Background ==
Labor frontbencher Allan Fraser unsuccessfully challenged ALP leader H. V. Evatt. Fraser was a known maverick who thought Evatt unelectable, and was derisive of his handling of the Industrial Groups and the ensuing "split" in the Labor Party.

Evatt was re-elected comfortably by 58 votes to 20. Arthur Calwell was re-elected deputy leader, securing 42 votes against 20 for Eddie Ward and 14 for Les Haylen.

== Results ==
The following table gives the ballot results:

Name	Votes	Percentage
H. V. Evatt	58	74.35
Allan Fraser	20	25.65

== See also ==
- Australian Labor Party split of 1955
- 1955 Australian federal election
