= Dugald Munro =

Australian grazier and politician

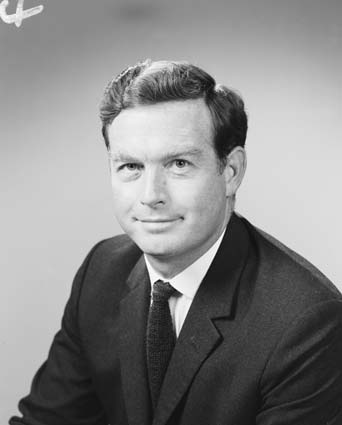

Member of the Australian Parliament for Eden-Monaro
- In office 26 November 1966 – 25 October 1969
- Preceded by: Allan Fraser
- Succeeded by: Allan Fraser

Personal details
- Born: 12 June 1930 Sydney
- Died: 20 June 1973 (aged 43) Sydney
- Party: Liberal Party of Australia
- Spouse: Romayne Hordern (m. 1958)
- Relations: Norman William Kater (grandfather)
- Occupation: Grazier

Dugald Ranald Ross Munro (12 June 1930 – 20 June 1973) was an Australian grazier and politician who had a single term in the House of Representatives from 1966 to 1969. He represented the Division of Eden-Monaro for the Liberal Party.

== Early life ==
Munro was the son of Jean (née Kater) and William Ranald Munro. His father was a stock and station agent in South West Queensland, as well as a champion polo player. His maternal grandfather Norman William Kater was a member of the New South Wales Legislative Council. In 1938, when Munro was seven years old, his father fell to his death from a hotel balcony. His mother remarried the following year to John Broinowski, and moved to Sydney.

Munro was educated at Cranbrook School, Sydney, from 1946 to 1948, where he played rugby for the first XV. He was also a junior tennis champion. He entered the family pastoral business and ran stations in Goondiwindi, Queensland, and Marulan, New South Wales. In 1958, he married socialite Romayne Hordern, with whom he had four children.

== Politics ==
Munro first stood for parliament at the 1963 election, losing to the incumbent Australian Labor Party (ALP) member Allan Fraser by 800 votes. He reprised his candidacy at the 1966 election and defeated Fraser – in office since 1943 – by 624 votes with the aid of Country and Democratic Labor Party preferences. Munro successfully lobbied for the headquarters of the Snowy Mountain Hydro-electricity Authority to remain in Cooma. He lost to Fraser in a rematch at the 1969 election.

== Death ==
Munro died in a lift accident in a building in Bridge Street, Sydney, eight days after his 43rd birthday. He was crushed to death between the lift cage and the door, despite the efforts of three bystanders – his brother, a teenage girl, and the lift operator – to free him.

Parliament of Australia
Preceded by Allan Fraser	Member for Eden-Monaro; 1966–1969	Succeeded by Allan Fraser
