= Food Preservers' Union of Australia =

Australian trade union

The Food Preservers' Union of Australia (FPUA) was an Australian trade union which existed between 1898 and 1992. It represented a broad range of production workers in the food processing industry, including many female members.

== History ==
Around 1898 a union of jam, sauce and pickle workers formed, but only registered in 1911 as the Jam Sauce Pickle & Food Preserving Employees' Union of Australia. In 1916 it changed its name to the Amalgamated Food Preserving Employees' Union of Australia. The union was insignificant in organising food workers until 1922, when it was reorganised under the leadership of Percy Clarey, a Victorian. The union changed its name again in 1929 to the Food Preservers' Union of Australia. While it had fluctuating membership due to the seasonal nature of canning work, the union was one of the few which maintained a strong presence in rural Australia.

In the latter part of the 20th century the union, and particularly its Victorian branch led by Tom Ryan, became closely associated with the left wing of the Australian labour movement. During the 1980s the FPUA played a prominent role in opposing the Prices and Incomes Accord, an agreement between the Australian Council of Trade Unions (ACTU) and federal Labor government to restrict wage increases in order to reduce inflation. The union had been campaigning for a wage increase of $16 prior to the introduction of the Accord, and refused to abandon the claim despite significant pressure from both the federal government and the ACTU. In 1983 FPUA members at the Heinz factory near Melbourne went on strike - in response, the federal government sought to exclude them from National Wage Increases mandated under the Accord. The Industrial Relations Commission agreed to exclude the food preservers, causing their wages to decline relative to other workers, and by September 1984 the union was forced to give an undertaking to the Commission not to pursue wage claims outside the wage indexation principles set by the Accord.

In November of the same year, however, 160 FPU members at the Rosella-Lipton factory in Melbourne went on strike, demanding the re-employment of a number of sacked workers and a five percent pay increase. In response, the employers' association, the Victorian Chamber of Manufacturers, supported by the federal government and the ACTU, applied to have the union deregistered. A number of left-wing or militant unions, such as the Electrical Trades Union, Builders Labourers Federation, Transport Workers Union and several railway unions offered support to the FPU, including organising a black ban of Rosella Lipton's parent company, Unilever. Faced with the potential for major disruption Unilever agreed to much of the worker's demands, and the dispute was resolved by January 1985.

The union played a prominent role in promoting the interests of female workers, and the first woman elected to the Victorian Trades Hall Council executive was Gail Cotton, a FPU organiser, in 1978.

The FPU was also active in working to protect its members' jobs, threatened by the decline in Australian manufacturing from the 1970s onwards caused by globalisation and competition from cheap imports. This included organising a ban on the import of foreign dried grapes, enforced by waterfront unions, as well as successfully lobbying the South Australian government to provide redevelopment funding to support a local fruit cannery in the Riverland region and establish the Riverland Development Council.

== Merger ==
In 1992 the union merged with the Confectionery Workers' Union to form the Confectionery Workers & Food Preservers Union of Australia. Two years later in 1994 this union also amalgamated, this time with the Automotive, Metals & Engineering Union, to form the Australian Manufacturing Workers Union (AMWU).
