= Kath Williams =

Australian trade unionist and labour activist

Katherine Mary Isabel "Kath" Williams, née Chambers and formerly Clarey (23 April 1895 – 17 April 1975) was an Australian trade unionist and campaigner for equal pay.

She was born at Lara to law clerk Edward Crombie Chambers and Jane Miriam, née Harding. She was educated at Melbourne University High School before graduating as a teacher from the Melbourne College of Domestic Economy in 1915. She married Percy Clarey, a trade union leader and later a prominent federal MP, on 31 March 1917 at Box Hill. Husband and wife were both active in the Australian Labor Party, with Kath secretary of the Caulfield branch and president of the Women's Organising Committee in addition to holding membership of the state executive. She nominated for the seat of Caulfield at the 1935 election, but withdrew prior to the election. She was expelled from the Labor Party in December 1935 together with Maurice Blackburn, having spoken at a rally organised by the Victorian Council Against War and Fascism. Although she was reinstated in the Labor Party in 1936, her increasing radicalism led to the end of both her ALP membership and her marriage to Clarey. Later in 1936, she joined the Communist Party of Australia, and in December she and Clarey were divorced.

She resumed her teaching activities in 1938, first at Portland and then Wonthaggi. She married coalminer Anthony "Andy" Williams on 11 August 1945 in Melbourne and went to England with him, but by 1948 had returned alone to Melbourne to work for the Liquor Trades Union. Williams won a position on the state committee of the Communist Party in 1948, which she used primarily to promote equal pay for women; she also advanced this cause as union delegate to the Melbourne Trades Hall Council. Following the Australian Council of Trade Unions' 1953 decision to establish equal pay committees in each state, Williams was elected secretary of the Victorian committee. She attended the World Conference of Working Women in Budapest in 1956 as an observer, and wrote a booklet, Equality Will Be Won, about the struggle. In 1957 she presented the Equal Pay Petition, with 62,000 signatures, to the Commonwealth government.

Williams resigned from the Communist Party in 1963 to join the new Communist Party of Australia (Marxist-Leninist). She retired as an organiser in 1967 and died at Oakleigh in 1975, survived by the two sons of her first marriage.
