= James Mathews (Australian politician) =

Australian politician

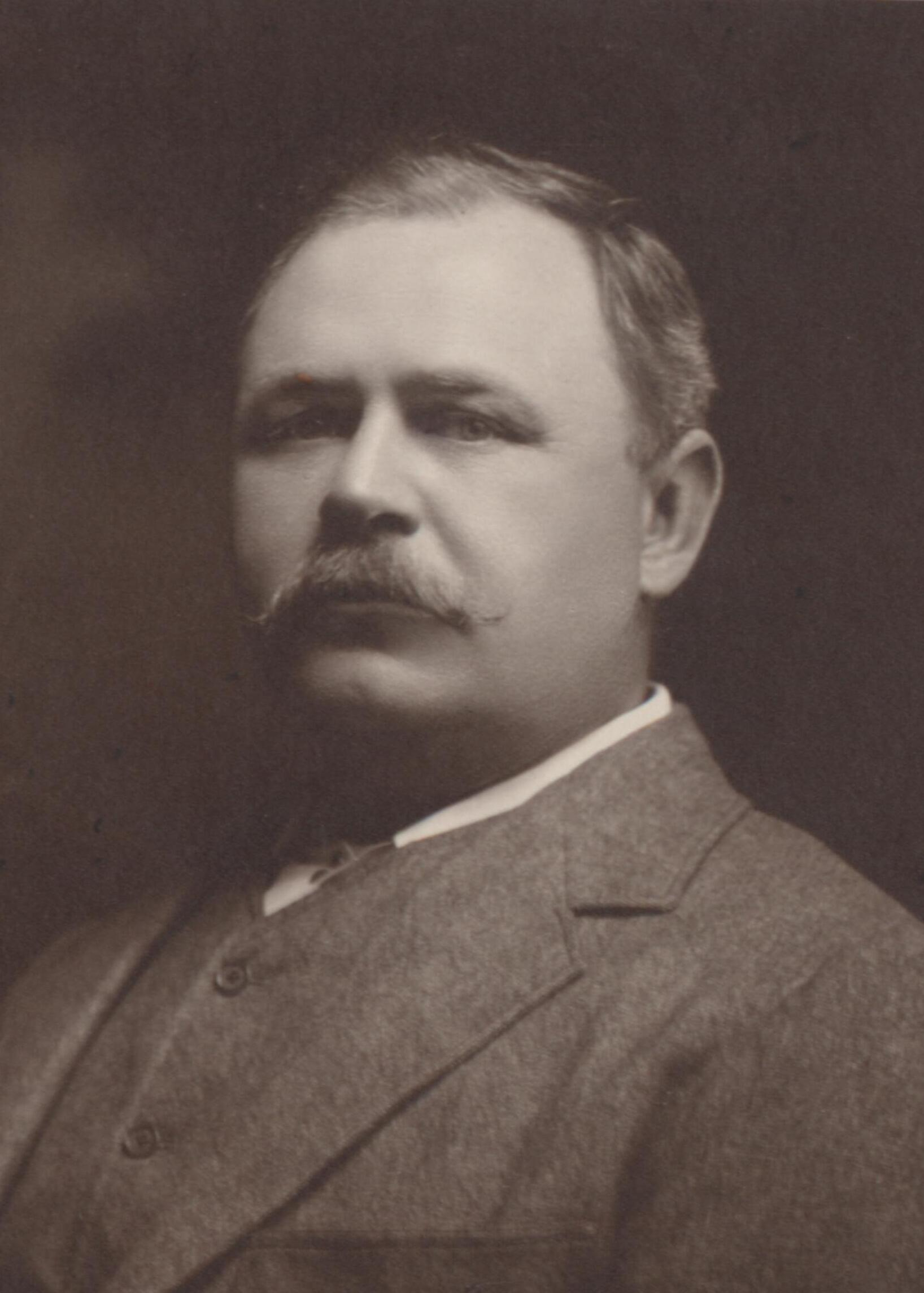

Member of the Australian Parliament for Melbourne Ports
- In office 12 December 1906 – 27 November 1931
- Preceded by: Samuel Mauger
- Succeeded by: Jack Holloway

Personal details
- Born: 1865
- Died: 16 October 1934 (aged 68–69)
- Party: Australian Labor Party

James Mathews (1865 – 16 October 1934) was an Australian politician. He was an Australian Labor Party member of the Australian House of Representatives from 1906 to 1931, representing the electorate of Melbourne Ports.

Mathews was born in the Victoria Barracks in Melbourne, where his father was regimental tailor, and spent seven years in Sri Lanka as a child when his father was deployed there. He was educated at Smith's school in South Melbourne and became a tailor. He joined the Progressive Political League, a forerunner of the Victorian branch of the Labor Party, in 1892. Mathews went to Sydney in 1893, and became secretary of the Woolloomooloo branch of the Labor Party in the same year; he also organised for the Tailors' Union while in Sydney. Mathews returned to Melbourne in 1898, and worked for the Collins St firm of Haig Bros. before going into business for himself; he was operating a tailoring business in South Melbourne opposite the South Melbourne Post Office at the time of his election. Prior to his election, Mathews also spent six years as the secretary of the South Melbourne branch of the Labor Party, remained involved in the Tailors' Union, and had made two unsuccessful candidacies for the City of South Melbourne council.

Mathews contested the 1903 federal election, but was defeated by incumbent Protectionist Samuel Mauger. Mauger moved to the new seat of Maribyrnong in 1906 and Mathews won the seat in his absence. He was then re-elected nine times, often running unopposed and never polling less than 65% of the primary vote. He was described The Courier-Mail upon his death as "a speaker of great force" and "an apt interjector" in the House. Mathews was always opposed to war and militarism, and campaigned against conscription in the bitter referendums of 1916 and 1917. In 1917, he was one of several political figures prosecuted under the War Precautions Act with having "made false statements of a kind likely to affect the judgment of the electors" in the referendum, but represented himself and was acquitted. Mathews was struggling with serious health issues by the mid-1920s, and retired due to ill health at the 1931 federal election.

He died in October 1934 and was cremated at Fawkner Crematorium and Memorial Park.

Parliament of Australia
Preceded by Samuel Mauger	Member for Melbourne Ports; 1906–1931	Succeeded by Jack Holloway
