= 1951 Australian Labor Party leadership election =

1951 Australian Labor Party Leadership election
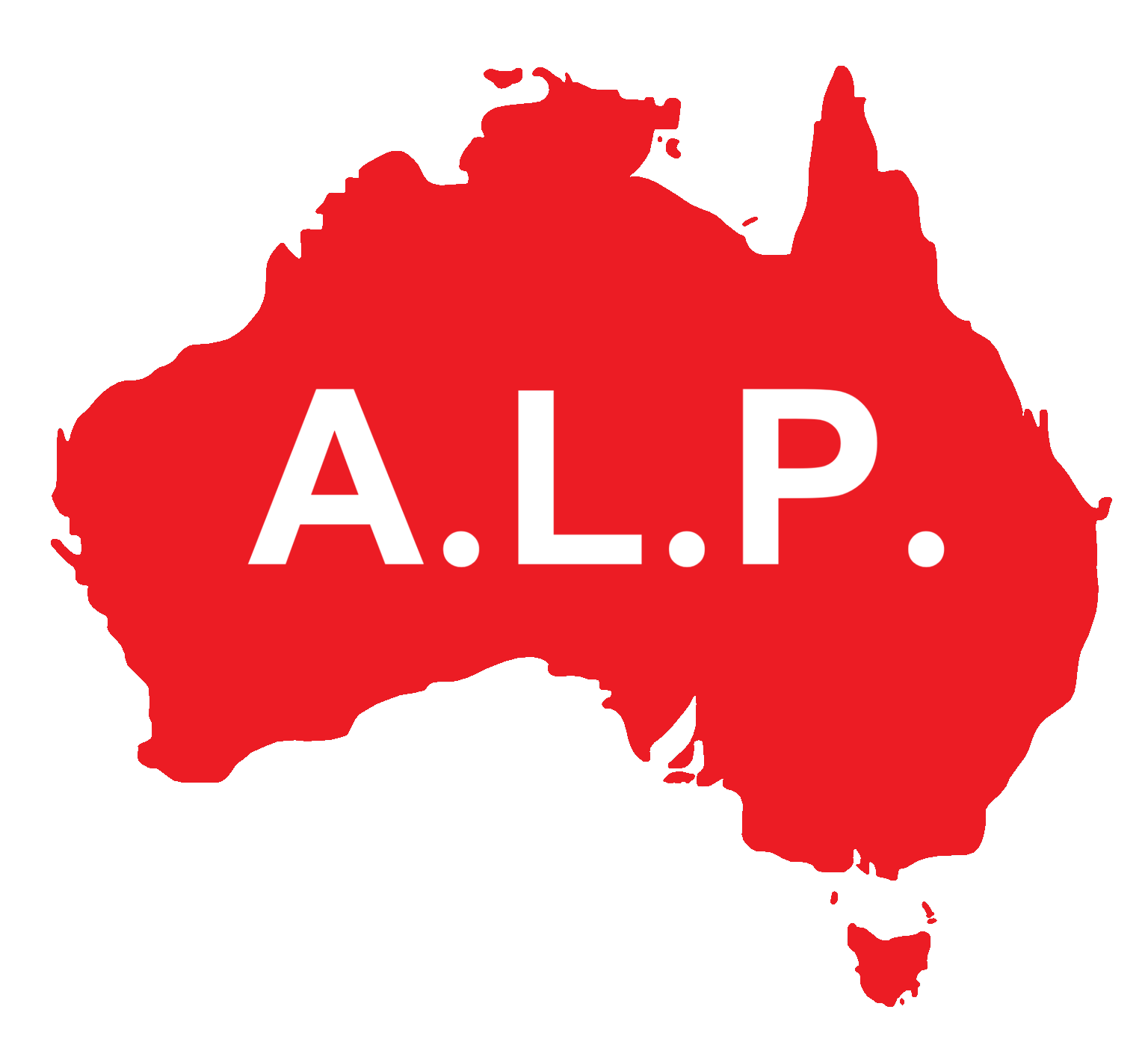
- 20 June 1951
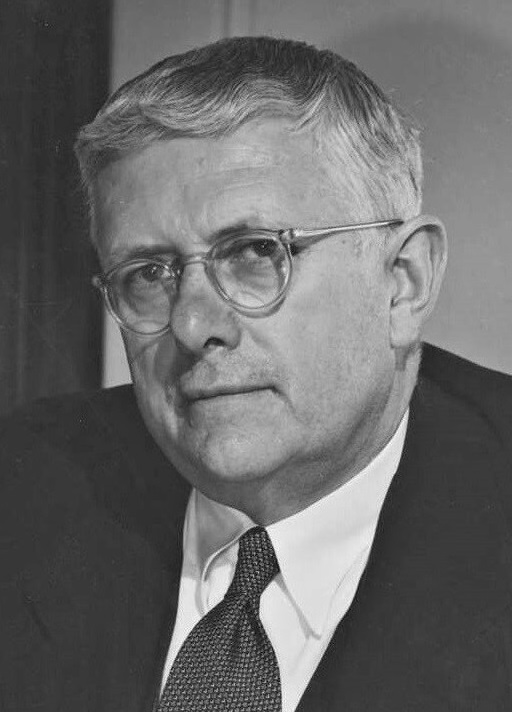
Candidate	H. V. Evatt
Caucus vote	Unopposed
Leader before election
Ben Chifley
Elected Leader
H. V. Evatt

A leadership election in the Australian Labor Party, then the opposition party in the Parliament of Australia, was held on 20 June 1951. It saw the election of Leader H. V. Evatt as leader following the death of sitting leader Ben Chifley.

== Background ==
As deputy leader, Evatt became acting leader of the party upon Chifley's death on 13 June. Prior to the meeting, there was speculation that Arthur Calwell would also contest the leadership, however by 19 June he had decided not to run. As a result, Evatt was elected unopposed. In the ballot for the deputy leadership, Calwell defeated Percy Clarey by nine votes on the third ballot, following the elimination of Eddie Ward and Allan Fraser:

Candidate	Constituency	1st ballot	2nd ballot	3rd ballot
Arthur Calwell	Melbourne (VIC)	38	36	45
Percy Clarey	Bendigo (VIC)	18	27	36
Eddie Ward	East Sydney (NSW)	16	18	Eliminated
Allan Fraser	Eden-Monaro (NSW)	9	Eliminated	Eliminated

== See also ==
- 1951 Australian federal election
