= Richard Darcey =

Australian politician

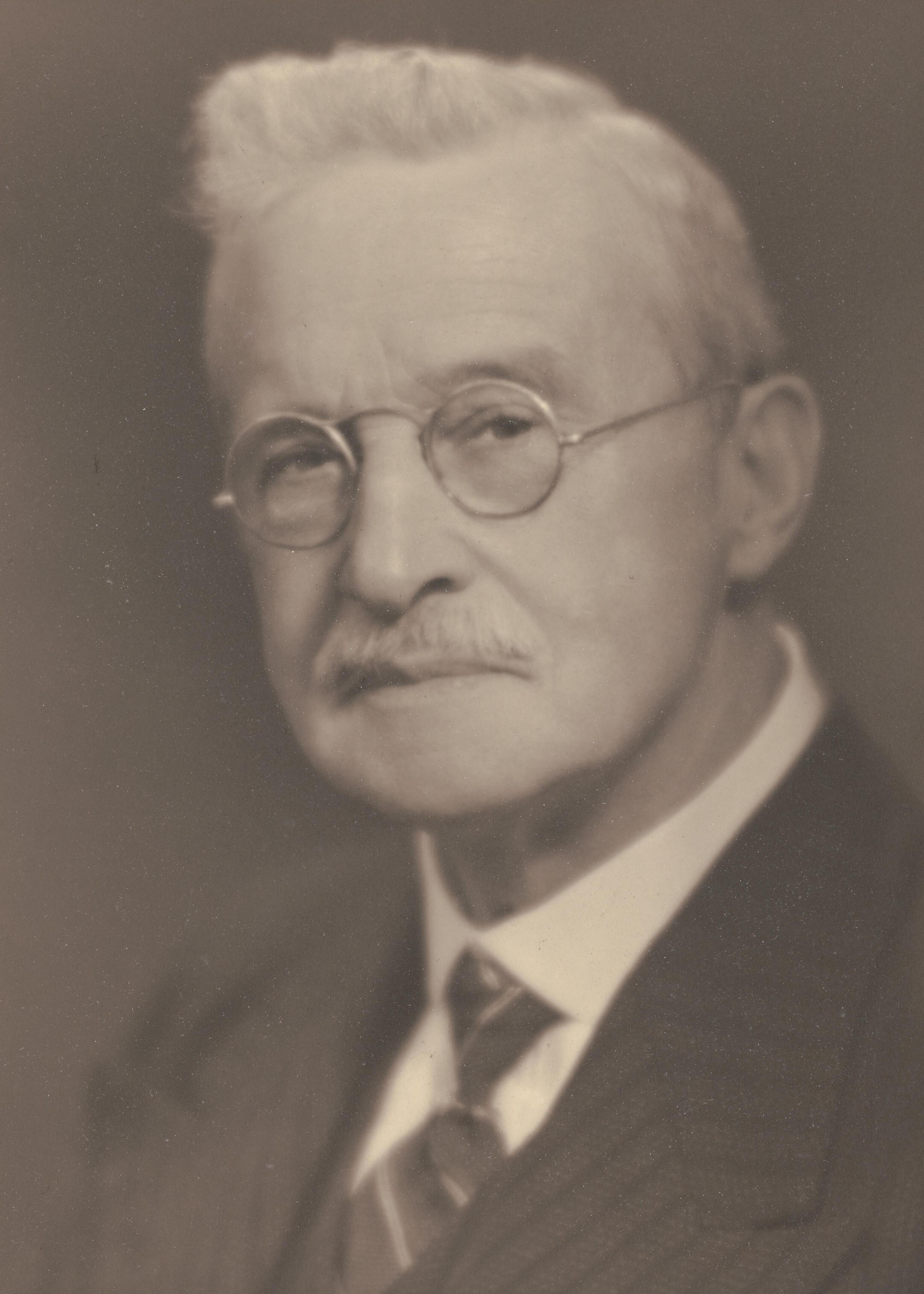

Senator for Tasmania
- In office 1 July 1938 – 30 June 1944

Personal details
- Born: 26 February 1870 Launceston, Tasmania, Australia
- Died: 26 July 1944 (aged 74) North Sydney, New South Wales, Australia
- Party: Labor
- Spouse: Blanche Kelly (m. 1905–1943)
- Occupation: Jeweller; Watchmaker; Optician

Richard John Darcey (26 February 1870 – 26 July 1944) was an Australian politician. Born in Launceston, Tasmania, he received a primary education before becoming an apprentice jeweller. He eventually became a jeweller in Hobart, and rose to become President of the Retail Jewellers' Association. In 1937, he was elected to the Australian Senate as a Labor Senator for Tasmania. He held the seat until 1943, when he was defeated, having been demoted to fourth place on the ballot to make way for Tasmanian state minister Nick McKenna. Darcey died in 1944.

== Early life ==
Darcey was born on 26 February 1870 in Launceston, Tasmania. He was the son of Catherine (née Lane) and Thomas Darcey; his father was a shoemaker.

Darcey received a primary school education and then was apprenticed to a jeweller in Launceston. He worked for F. & W. Stewart for eighteen years before moving to Hobart, where he worked with Golding and Son and then established his own jewellery shop in 1911. He also practised as an optician and watchmaker from his shop in Liverpool Street. He was federal president of the Retail Jewellers' Association, and was a delegate to state opticians' conferences, with Tasmania being the first Australian state to implement compulsory registration of opticians.

== Politics ==
Darcey was a financial backer of the Daily Post, which supported the Australian Labor Party (ALP), and was an ally of its editor Edmund Dwyer-Gray. He first stood for parliament at the 1934 federal election, as one of four endorsed ALP candidates in the seat of Denison.

At the 1937 election, Darcey was elected to a six-year Senate term commencing on 1 July 1938. He was defeated at the 1943 election after being relegated to fourth position on Labor's ticket, behind Nick McKenna.

=== Political positions ===
Darcey was a prominent advocate of reforming Australia's monetary system along social credit lines. He opposed mainstream economics and the banking industry, attributing the Great Depression to the failure of banks to provide credit. However, he did not support nationalisation of the banks.

In parliament, Darcey described himself as a "missionary in the banking field". He spoke "at great length and often repetitively on social credit, so much so that, as he admitted, he sometimes emptied the chamber".

== Personal life ==
Darcey married Blanche Kelly in 1905, with whom he had five children. He was active in Catholic community organisations, serving as president of the Hobart branch of the Society of Saint Vincent de Paul and being prominent in the Hibernian Australasian Catholic Benefit Society. He was also president and a life member of the Tasmanian Amateur Athletic Association.

After leaving parliament, Darcey retired to his home in North Hobart. He was widowed in October 1943. Darcey died on 26 July 1944 at the Mater Hospital, North Sydney. He had been ill for a period of three weeks while visiting Sydney on business, suffering from hemiplegia.
