= Minister for Health and Ageing =

Australian cabinet position

- Commonwealth Coat of Arms

- Flag of Australia

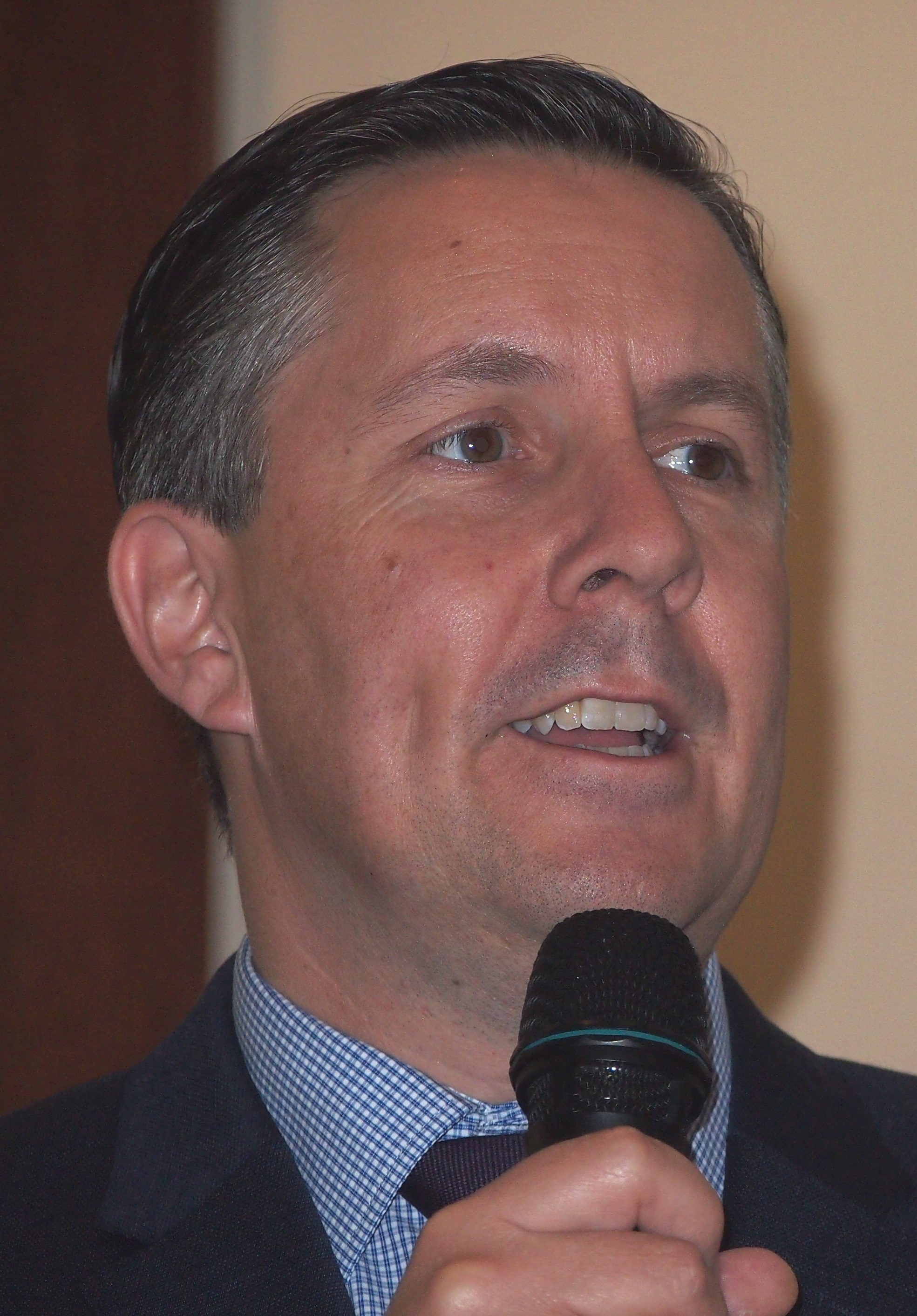
- Incumbent; Mark Butler since 1 June 2022
- Department of Health, Disability and Ageing
- Style: The Honourable
- Appointer: Governor-General; on the advice of the prime minister
- Inaugural holder: Walter Massy-Greene (as Minister for Health)
- Formation: 10 March 1921
- Website: www.health.gov.au/ministers/the-hon-mark-butler-mp

The Minister for Health and Ageing is the position in the Australian cabinet responsible for national health and wellbeing and medical research. The incumbent Minister is Labor MP Mark Butler.

In the Government of Australia, the minister is responsible for national health and medical research policy, providing direction and oversight of the Department of Health, Disability and Ageing.

== History ==
Under Section 55(ix) of the Australian Constitution, the Commonwealth Parliament had the power to "make laws for the peace, order and good government of the Commonwealth with respect to Quarantine." This was the only area of public health in which the Commonwealth had authority at the time of Federation. The federal parliament did not use this power until the proclamation of the Quarantine Act 1908, on 30 March 1908. The control of the administration of quarantine was under the administration of the Minister for Trade and Customs from 1908 until 1921. This Minister's responsibilities in health matters increased as the Australian Government took a greater role in the provision of public health services during the early 20th century, in particular after the First World War.

A separate Department of Health was established on 10 March 1921, and the position of Minister for Health was then formally created in the fifth Hughes Ministry. The role of the Department of Health has continued to expand and further federal responsibility for health was authorised by the passage, at referendum, of a constitutional amendment in 1946. From 1987 until the establishment of the current department in 2013, the department controlled by the minister had various different names – Department of Community Services and Health (1987–1991), Department of Health, Housing and Community Services (1991–1993), Department of Health, Housing, Local Government and Community Services (1993), Department of Human Services and Health (1993–1996), Department of Health and Family Services (1996–1998), Department of Health and Aged Care (1998–2001), and Department of Health and Ageing (2001–2013).

Section 51 (xxiiiA) of the Constitution now states the Commonwealth (federal) Parliament has the power to

make laws for the peace, order and good government of the Commonwealth [of Australia] with respect to the provision of maternity allowances, widows' pensions, child endowment, unemployment, pharmaceutical, sickness and hospital benefits, medical and dental services (but not so as to authorise any form of civil conscription), benefits to students and family allowances.

As a result of this amendment the federal government now has a key role in financing and providing medical services through entities such as Medicare and the Pharmaceutical Benefits Scheme.

From 1972 to 1975 under Doug Everingham, the minister was named the "Minister for Helth [sic]" in some informal contexts due to Everingham's support of Spelling Reform.

== List of ministers ==
=== Health ===
The following individuals have been appointed as Minister for Health, or any of its precedent titles:

Order	Minister	Party	Prime Minister	Title	Term start	Term end	Term in office
1	Walter Massy-Greene	Nationalist	Hughes	Minister for Health	10 March 1921	5 February 1923	1 year, 332 days
2	Austin Chapman	Nationalist	Bruce	Minister for Health	9 February 1923	26 May 1924	1 year, 107 days
3	Littleton Groom	Nationalist	Bruce	Minister for Health	26 May 1924	13 June 1924	18 days
4	Herbert Pratten	Nationalist	Bruce	Minister for Health	13 June 1924	16 January 1925	217 days
5	Sir Neville Howse	Nationalist	Bruce	Minister for Health	16 January 1925	2 April 1927	2 years, 76 days
6	Stanley Bruce	Nationalist	Bruce	Minister for Health	2 April 1927	24 February 1928	328 days
(5)	Sir Neville Howse	Nationalist	Bruce	Minister for Health	24 February 1928	22 October 1929	1 year, 240 days
7	Frank Anstey	Labor	Scullin	Minister for Health	22 October 1929	3 March 1931	1 year, 132 days
8	John McNeill	Labor	Scullin	Minister for Health	3 March 1931	6 January 1932	309 days
9	Charles Marr	United Australia	Lyons	Minister for Health	6 January 1932	12 October 1934	2 years, 279 days
10	Billy Hughes	United Australia	Lyons	Minister for Health	12 October 1934	6 November 1935	1 year, 25 days
11	Joseph Lyons	United Australia	Lyons	Minister for Health	6 November 1935	26 February 1936	112 days
(10)	Billy Hughes	United Australia	Lyons	Minister for Health	26 February 1936	29 November 1937	1 year, 276 days
12	Sir Earle Page	Country	Lyons	Minister for Health	29 November 1937	7 November 1938	343 days
13	Harry Foll	United Australia	Lyons	Minister for Health	7 November 1938	7 April 1939	170 days
13	Harry Foll	United Australia	Page	Minister for Health	7 April 1939	26 April 1939	170 days
14	Sir Frederick Stewart	United Australia	Menzies	Minister for Health	26 April 1939	14 March 1940	323 days
15	Harold Thorby	Country	Menzies	Minister for Health	14 March 1940	28 October 1940	228 days
(14)	Sir Frederick Stewart	United Australia	Menzies	Minister for Health	28 October 1940	29 August 1941	344 days
(14)	Sir Frederick Stewart	United Australia	Fadden	Minister for Health	29 August 1941	7 October 1941	344 days
16	Jack Holloway	Labor	Curtin	Minister for Health	7 October 1941	21 September 1943	1 year, 349 days
17	James Fraser	Labor	Curtin	Minister for Health	21 September 1943	6 July 1945	1 year, 288 days
17	James Fraser	Labor	Forde	Minister for Health	6 July 1945	13 July 1945	7 days
17	James Fraser	Labor	Chifley	Minister for Health	13 July 1945	18 June 1946	340 days
18	Nick McKenna	Labor	Chifley	Minister for Health	18 June 1946	19 December 1949	3 years, 184 days
(12)	Sir Earle Page	Country	Menzies	Minister for Health	19 December 1949	11 January 1956	6 years, 23 days
19	Donald Cameron	Liberal	Menzies	Minister for Health	11 January 1956	22 December 1961	5 years, 345 days
20	Harrie Wade	Country	Menzies	Minister for Health	22 December 1961	18 November 1964	2 years, 332 days
21	Reginald Swartz	Liberal	Menzies	Minister for Health	21 November 1964	26 January 1966	1 year, 66 days
22	Jim Forbes	Liberal	Holt	Minister for Health	26 January 1966	19 December 1967	5 years, 55 days
22	Jim Forbes	Liberal	McEwen	Minister for Health	19 December 1967	10 January 1968	5 years, 55 days
22	Jim Forbes	Liberal	Gorton	Minister for Health	10 January 1968	10 March 1971	5 years, 55 days
22	Jim Forbes	Liberal	McMahon	Minister for Health	10 March 1971	22 March 1971	5 years, 55 days
23	Ivor Greenwood	Liberal	McMahon	Minister for Health	22 March 1971	2 August 1971	133 days
24	Sir Ken Anderson	Liberal	McMahon	Minister for Health	2 August 1971	5 December 1972	1 year, 125 days
25	Lance Barnard^{1}	Labor	Whitlam	Minister for Health	5 December 1972	19 December 1972	14 days
26	Doug Everingham	Labor	Whitlam	Minister for Health^{2}	19 December 1972	11 November 1975	2 years, 327 days
27	Don Chipp	Liberal	Fraser	Minister for Health	11 November 1975	22 December 1975	41 days
28	Ralph Hunt	National Country	Fraser	Minister for Health	22 December 1975	8 December 1979	3 years, 351 days
29	Michael MacKellar	Liberal	Fraser	Minister for Health	8 December 1979	20 April 1982	2 years, 133 days
30	Peter Baume	Liberal	Fraser	Minister for Health	20 April 1982	7 May 1982	17 days
31	Jim Carlton	Liberal	Fraser	Minister for Health	7 May 1982	11 March 1983	308 days
32	Neal Blewett	Labor	Hawke	Minister for Health	11 March 1983	24 July 1987	7 years, 24 days
32	Neal Blewett	Labor	Hawke	Minister for Community Services and Health	24 July 1987	4 April 1990	7 years, 24 days
33	Brian Howe	Labor	Hawke	Minister for Community Services and Health	4 April 1990	7 June 1991	2 years, 354 days
33	Brian Howe	Labor	Keating	Minister for Health, Housing and Community Services	7 June 1991	24 March 1993	2 years, 354 days
34	Graham Richardson	Labor	Keating	Minister for Health	24 March 1993	25 March 1994	1 year, 1 day
35	Carmen Lawrence	Labor	Keating	Minister for Human Services and Health	25 March 1994	11 March 1996	1 year, 352 days
36	Michael Wooldridge	Liberal	Howard	Minister for Health and Family Services	11 March 1996	21 October 1998	5 years, 260 days
36	Michael Wooldridge	Liberal	Howard	Minister for Health and Aged Care	21 October 1998	26 November 2001	5 years, 260 days
37	Kay Patterson	Liberal	Howard	Minister for Health and Ageing	26 November 2001	7 October 2003	1 year, 315 days
38	Tony Abbott	Liberal	Howard	Minister for Health and Ageing	7 October 2003	3 December 2007	4 years, 57 days
39	Nicola Roxon	Labor	Rudd	Minister for Health and Ageing	3 December 2007	24 June 2010	4 years, 8 days
39	Nicola Roxon	Labor	Gillard	Minister for Health and Ageing	24 June 2010	11 December 2011	4 years, 8 days
40	Tanya Plibersek	Labor	Gillard	Minister for Health	11 December 2011	1 July 2013	1 year, 281 days
40	Tanya Plibersek	Labor	Rudd	Minister for Health and Medical Research	1 July 2013	18 September 2013	1 year, 281 days
41	Peter Dutton	Liberal	Abbott	Minister for Health	18 September 2013	23 December 2014	1 year, 96 days
42	Sussan Ley	Liberal	Abbott	Minister for Health	23 December 2014	15 September 2015	2 years, 21 days
42	Sussan Ley	Liberal	Turnbull	Minister for Health	15 September 2015	19 July 2016	2 years, 21 days
42	Sussan Ley	Liberal	Turnbull	Minister for Health and Ageing	19 July 2016	13 January 2017	2 years, 21 days
(acting)	Arthur Sinodinos	Liberal	Turnbull	Minister for Health and Ageing	13 January 2017	24 January 2017	11 days
43	Greg Hunt^{3}	Liberal	Turnbull	Minister for Health	24 January 2017	24 August 2018	5 years, 119 days
43	Greg Hunt^{3}	Liberal	Morrison	Minister for Health	24 August 2018	22 December 2020	5 years, 119 days
43	Greg Hunt^{3}	Liberal	Morrison	Minister for Health and Aged Care	22 December 2020	23 May 2022	5 years, 119 days
43	Scott Morrison^{3}	Liberal	Morrison	Minister for Health	14 March 2020	23 May 2022	2 years, 70 days
(acting)	Katy Gallagher^{4}	Labor	Albanese	Minister for Health and Aged Care	23 May 2022	1 June 2022	9 days
44	Mark Butler	Labor	Albanese	Minister for Health and Aged Care	1 June 2022	13 May 2025	4 years, 173 days
44	Mark Butler	Labor	Albanese	Minister for Health and Ageing	13 May 2025	Incumbent	4 years, 173 days

Notes

^{1} Barnard was part of a two-man ministry that comprised just Gough Whitlam and Barnard for fourteen days until the full ministry was announced.
^{2} Doug Everingham was a supporter of Spelling Reform and he preferred to spell it "Helth", but this was not the formal spelling of the portfolio's name (see above).
^{3} Morrison was appointed as Minister for Health by the Governor-General on Morrison's advice in March 2020, with both Morrison and Hunt holding the position of Minister for Health until May 2022. However, the appointment of Morrison was not made public until August 2022.
^{4} Senator Gallagher is part of an interim Albanese ministry that consisted of Anthony Albanese, Richard Marles, Penny Wong, Jim Chalmers and herself until the full ministry was sworn in on 1 June 2022.

=== Aged care ===
The following individuals have been appointed as the Minister for Aged Care and Seniors, or any of its precedent titles. Ministers for aged care or ageing were appointed from 1988 to 1993 and again from 1998 to 2013. The portfolio gained a mental health component in 2010. The latter returned to the health portfolio in 2013, with ageing moving to social services. The following individuals have been appointed as Minister for Mental Health and Ageing, or any of its precedent titles: The Turnbull government transferred the aged care portfolio back to the Department of Health in October 2015. The position is a separate role that supplements the cabinet role of the Minister for Health and Aged Care. Between January 2017 and January 2025, it was an outer ministry role. The role was briefly made a Cabinet of Australia role in the first Albanese ministry from January to May 2025, before it returned to the outer ministry in May 2025 with the swearing-in of the second Albanese ministry.

Order	Minister	Party	Prime Minister	Title	Term start	Term end	Term in office
1	Peter Morris	Labor	Hawke	Minister for Housing and Aged Care	19 January 1988	15 February 1988	27 days
2	Peter Staples	Labor	Hawke	Minister for Housing and Aged Care	15 February 1988	7 May 1990	5 years, 64 days
2	Peter Staples	Labor	Hawke	Minister for Aged, Family and Health Services	7 May 1990	20 December 1991	5 years, 64 days
2	Peter Staples	Labor	Keating	Minister for Aged, Family and Health Services	20 December 1991	24 March 1993	5 years, 64 days
3	Bronwyn Bishop	Liberal	Howard	Minister for Aged Care	21 October 1998	26 November 2001	3 years, 36 days
4	Kevin Andrews	Liberal	Howard	Minister for Ageing	26 November 2001	7 October 2003	1 year, 315 days
5	Julie Bishop	Liberal	Howard	Minister for Ageing	7 October 2003	27 January 2006	2 years, 112 days
6	Santo Santoro	Liberal	Howard	Minister for Ageing	27 January 2006	21 March 2007	1 year, 53 days
7	Christopher Pyne	Liberal	Howard	Minister for Ageing	21 March 2007	3 December 2007	257 days
8	Justine Elliot	Labor	Rudd	Minister for Ageing	3 December 2007	28 June 2010	2 years, 207 days
9	Mark Butler	Labor	Gillard	Minister for Mental Health and Ageing	28 June 2010	1 July 2013	3 years, 3 days
10	Jacinta Collins	Labor	Rudd	Minister for Mental Health and Ageing	1 July 2013	18 September 2013	79 days
11	Sussan Ley	Liberal	Turnbull	Minister for Aged Care	30 September 2015	19 July 2016	1 year, 105 days
11	Sussan Ley	Liberal	Turnbull	Minister for Health and Ageing	19 July 2016	13 January 2017	1 year, 105 days
(acting)	Arthur Sinodinos	Liberal	Turnbull	Minister for Health and Ageing	13 January 2017	24 January 2017	11 days
12	Ken Wyatt	Liberal	Turnbull	Minister for Aged Care	24 January 2017	28 August 2018	2 years, 125 days
12	Ken Wyatt	Liberal	Morrison	Minister for Senior Australians and Aged Care	28 August 2018	29 May 2019	2 years, 125 days
13	Richard Colbeck	Liberal	Morrison	Minister for Aged Care and Senior Australians	29 May 2019	22 December 2020	2 years, 359 days
13	Richard Colbeck	Liberal	Morrison	Minister for Senior Australians and Aged Care Services	22 December 2020	23 May 2022	2 years, 359 days
(9)	Mark Butler	Labor	Albanese	Minister for Health and Aged Care	1 June 2022	13 May 2025	4 years, 173 days
(9)	Mark Butler	Labor	Albanese	Minister for Health and Ageing	13 May 2025	Incumbent	4 years, 173 days
14	Anika Wells	Labor	Albanese	Minister for Aged Care	1 June 2022	13 May 2025	2 years, 346 days
15	Sam Rae	Labor	Albanese	Minister for Aged Care and Seniors	13 May 2025	Incumbent	1 year, 192 days

== List of assistant ministers ==
=== Health and aged care ===
The following individual has been appointed as Assistant Ministers of Health and Aged Care, or any of its precedent titles:

Order	Minister	Party	Prime Minister	Title	Term start	Term end	Term in office
1	Christopher Pyne	Liberal	Howard	Assistant Minister for Health and Ageing	30 January 2007	21 March 2007	50 days
2	Ken Wyatt	Liberal	Turnbull	Assistant Minister for Health	30 September 2015	18 February 2016	1 year, 110 days
2	Ken Wyatt	Liberal	Turnbull	Assistant Minister for Health and Aged Care	18 February 2016	18 January 2017	1 year, 110 days
3	David Gillespie	Nationals	Turnbull	Assistant Minister for Health	24 January 2017	20 December 2017	330 days
4	Ged Kearney	Labor	Albanese	Assistant Minister for Health and Aged Care	1 June 2022	13 May 2025	2 years, 346 days
5	Rebecca White	Labor	Albanese	Assistant Minister for Health and Aged Care	13 May 2025	Incumbent	1 year, 192 days

=== Indigenous health ===
The following individuals have been appointed as Assistant Minister for Indigenous Health, or any of its precedent titles:

Order	Minister	Party	Prime Minister	Title	Term start	Term end	Term in office
1	Warren Snowdon	Labor	Rudd	Minister for Indigenous Health, Rural and Regional Health and Regional Services Delivery	9 June 2009	24 June 2010	4 years, 101 days
1	Warren Snowdon	Labor	Gillard	Minister for Indigenous Health, Rural and Regional Health and Regional Services Delivery	24 June 2010	14 September 2010	4 years, 101 days
1	Warren Snowdon	Labor	Gillard	Minister for Indigenous Health	14 September 2010	27 June 2013	4 years, 101 days
1	Warren Snowdon	Labor	Rudd	Minister for Indigenous Health	27 June 2013	18 September 2013	4 years, 101 days
2	Ken Wyatt	Liberal	Turnbull; Morrison	Minister for Indigenous Health	24 January 2017	29 May 2019	2 years, 125 days
3	Malarndirri McCarthy	Labor	Albanese	Assistant Minister for Indigenous Health	1 June 2022	29 July 2024	2 years, 58 days
4	Ged Kearney	Labor	Albanese	Assistant Minister for Indigenous Health	29 July 2024	13 May 2025	288 days
5	Rebecca White	Labor	Albanese	Assistant Minister for Indigenous Health	13 May 2025	Incumbent	1 year, 192 days

=== Rural and regional health ===
The following individuals have been appointed as Assistant Minister for Rural and Regional Health, or any of its precedent titles:

Order	Minister	Party	Prime Minister	Title	Term start	Term end	Term in office
1	Warren Snowdon	Labor	Rudd	Minister for Indigenous Health, Rural and Regional Health and Regional Services Delivery	9 June 2009	24 June 2010	1 year, 97 days
1	Warren Snowdon	Labor	Gillard	Minister for Indigenous Health, Rural and Regional Health and Regional Services Delivery	24 June 2010	14 September 2010	1 year, 97 days
2	Fiona Nash	Nationals	Abbott	Assistant Minister for Health	18 September 2013	21 September 2015	2 years, 305 days
2	Fiona Nash	Nationals	Turnbull	Minister for Rural Health	21 September 2015	19 July 2016	2 years, 305 days
3	David Gillespie	Nationals	Turnbull	Assistant Minister for Rural Health	19 July 2016	24 January 2017	1 year, 154 days
3	David Gillespie	Nationals	Turnbull	Assistant Minister for Health	24 January 2017	20 December 2017	1 year, 154 days
4	Bridget McKenzie	Nationals	Turnbull	Minister for Rural Health	20 December 2017	28 August 2018	251 days
5	Mark Coulton	Nationals	Morrison	Minister for Regional Health, Regional Communications and Local Government	6 February 2020	2 July 2021	1 year, 146 days
(3)	David Gillespie	Nationals	Morrison	Minister for Regional Health	2 July 2021	22 May 2022	324 days
6	Emma McBride	Labor	Albanese	Assistant Minister for Rural and Regional Health	1 June 2022	Incumbent	4 years, 173 days

=== Mental health and suicide prevention ===
The following individuals have been appointed as Assistant Minister for Mental Health and Suicide Prevention, or any of its precedent titles:

Order	Minister	Party	Prime Minister	Title	Term start	Term end	Term in office
1	Melissa Parke	Labor	Gillard	Parliamentary Secretary for Mental Health	4 February 2013	1 July 2013	147 days
2	David Coleman	Liberal	Morrison	Assistant Minister to the Prime Minister for Mental Health and Suicide Prevention	22 December 2020	23 May 2022	1 year, 152 days
3	Emma McBride	Labor	Albanese	Assistant Minister for Mental Health and Suicide Prevention	1 June 2022	Incumbent	4 years, 173 days

=== Ageing ===
Order	Minister	Party	Prime Minister	Title	Term start	Term end	Term in office	Reference
1	Kate Thwaites	Labor	Albanese	Assistant Minister for Ageing	29 July 2024	13 May 2025	288 days	
