= Jack Holloway =

Australian politician (1875–1967)

The Right Honourable Jack Holloway
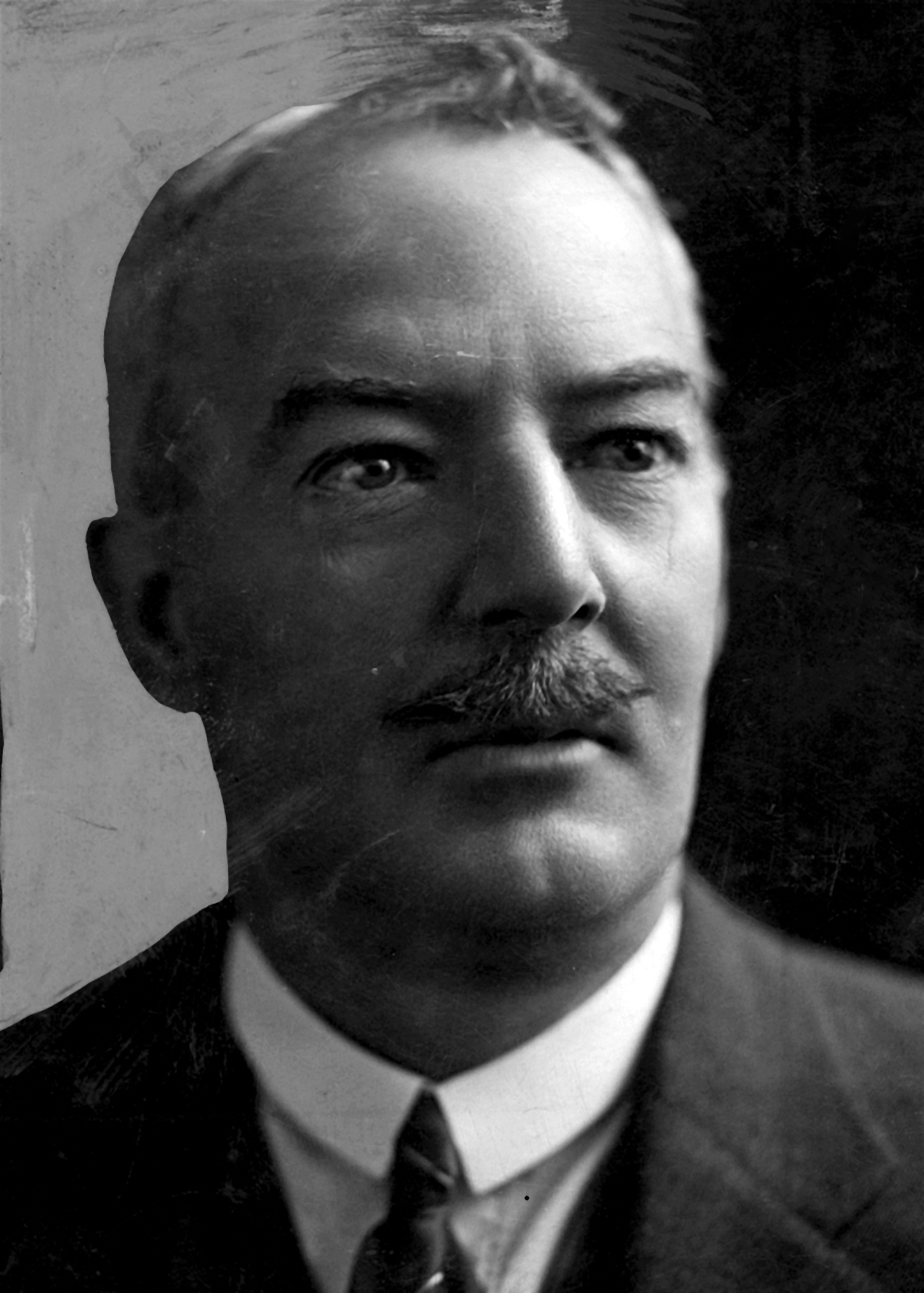
- Holloway c. 1929

Minister for Labour and National Service
- In office 21 September 1943 – 19 December 1949
- Prime Minister: John Curtin; Frank Forde; Ben Chifley
- Preceded by: Eddie Ward
- Succeeded by: Harold Holt

Minister for Health Minister for Social Services
- In office 7 October 1941 – 21 September 1943
- Prime Minister: John Curtin
- Preceded by: Frederick Stewart
- Succeeded by: James Fraser

Member of the Australian Parliament for Melbourne Ports
- In office 19 December 1931 – 19 March 1951
- Preceded by: James Mathews
- Succeeded by: Frank Crean

Member of the Australian Parliament for Flinders
- In office 12 October 1929 – 19 December 1931
- Preceded by: Stanley Bruce
- Succeeded by: Stanley Bruce

Personal details
- Born: 12 April 1875 Hobart, Tasmania, Australia
- Died: 3 December 1967 (aged 92) St Kilda, Victoria, Australia
- Party: Labor
- Occupation: Unionist

Edward James "Jack" Holloway (12 April 1875 – 3 December 1967) was an Australian politician who served in the House of Representatives from 1929 to 1951, representing the Labor Party. He served as a government minister under James Scullin, John Curtin, Frank Forde, and Ben Chifley.

== Early life ==
Holloway was born in Hobart, the son of a stonemason. He had little formal education and was apprenticed at an early age as a bootmaker. When he was 15 he moved to Melbourne, and later spent some time as a gold prospector in Western Australia. He also worked for a time in Broken Hill. By 1910 he had returned to Melbourne and worked as a boot machinist. He became an official of the Boot Trade Employees Association, and was also active in the Australian Labor Party. He was secretary of the No Conscription Committee during World War I. In 1916 he became secretary of the Melbourne Trades Hall Council, a position he held until 1929. He was a socialist and militant trade unionist, but opposed Communism and other revolutionary ideologies then current in the trade union movement.

== Political career ==
=== Early years ===
At the 1928 federal election, Holloway stood as the Labor candidate against the Nationalist (conservative) Prime Minister Stanley Bruce, in his seat of Flinders south of Melbourne. He was roundly defeated, but sought a rematch in 1929. His candidacy was a protest against the Bruce government's plan to dismantle the arbitration system.

On paper, Holloway faced odds as daunting as he had faced in 1928. Flinders appeared to be a fairly safe Nationalist seat; Labor needed a 10.7 percent swing to take the seat off the Coalition. However, the Bruce government was thrown from office after suffering a massive 18-seat swing. Bruce even lost his own seat to Holloway after an independent Liberal candidate's preferences flowed mostly to Holloway, which was enough to give Holloway the victory. This was the first of only two occasions on which a serving Australian Prime Minister has lost his own seat at a general election (the other being John Howard losing his seat to Maxine McKew in 2007).

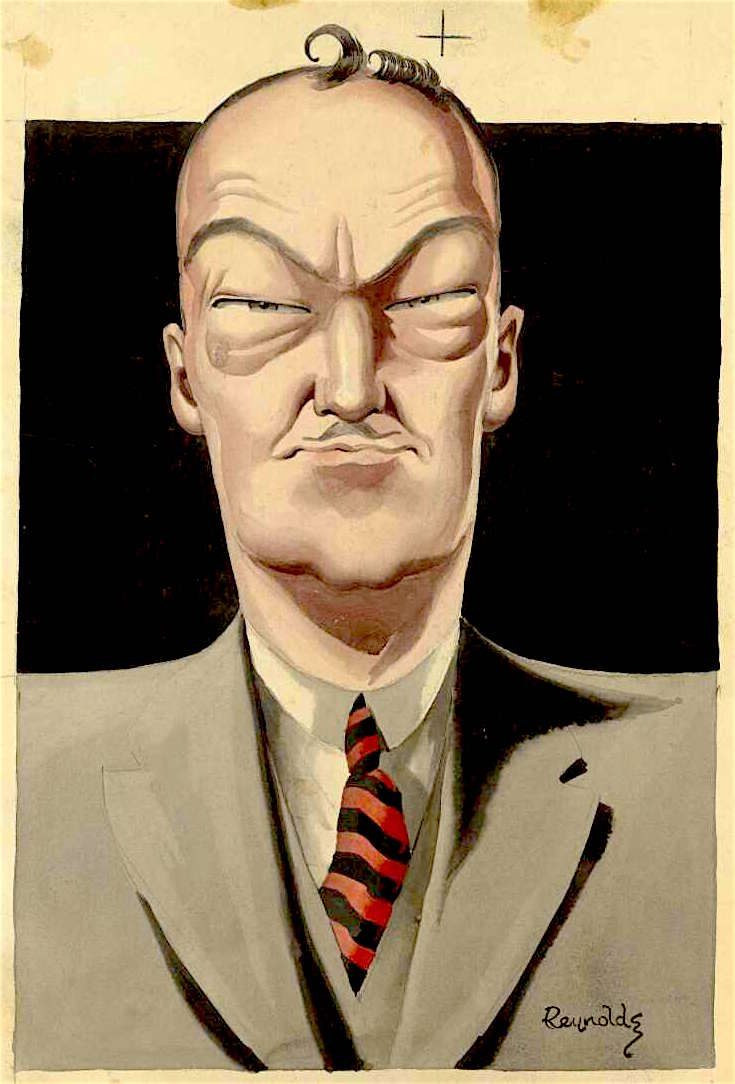
Caricature of Holloway by L. F. Reynolds

In Parliament, Holloway soon found himself in opposition to the policies of the Scullin Labor government, a government unable to deal with the Great Depression which began soon after the 1929 elections. Holloway, as the leading trade unionist in the Labor Caucus, opposed the deflationary Premiers' Plan (which reduced wages and pensions), and when Scullin accepted it he resigned his position as Assistant Minister for Industry, Council for Scientific and Industrial Research, in June 1931. The government fell at the end of the year, forcing an early election. With Labor's support dwindling, Holloway knew his chances of holding Flinders were slim. Not only was he a trade unionist holding a naturally upper-class seat, but Bruce was priming for a rematch. Instead, Holloway transferred to the safe Labor seat of Melbourne Ports, whose incumbent Labor MP, James Mathews, was retiring. Holloway's guess proved right. While Flinders reverted to form with Bruce winning it on an 18.5 percent swing, Holloway retained Melbourne Ports for Labor without serious difficulty as the two Labor factions were cut down to only 18 seats between them.

In opposition, Holloway was determined that Labor would never again adopt what he saw as anti-working-class policies. When Scullin retired as Labor leader in 1935, Holloway opposed Frank Forde's candidacy to succeed him on the grounds that Forde supported the Premiers' Plan five years earlier. He threw the support of left-wing members of caucus to John Curtin, who won the leadership ballot by just a single vote. Holloway thus became one of Curtin's most powerful supporters.

=== Government minister ===
When Labor came to power in October 1941, Curtin appointed Holloway Minister for Social Services and Minister for Health. In 1943, when Labor won large majorities in both houses of the Parliament, Holloway became Minister for Labour and National Service. Under wartime regulations, this gave him almost unlimited power over the labour force and the allocation of manpower. When Curtin died in 1945 Holloway again opposed Forde's leadership bid, helping to ensure that Ben Chifley, like himself an ex-trade unionist, was elected leader.

In April and May 1949, Holloway served as acting prime minister for 17 days while Chifley and Labor deputy leader (de facto Deputy Prime Minister) H. V. Evatt were out of the country.

Holloway retained his Labour portfolio under Chifley, and played a leading role in defeating the 1949 strike in the coal industry, which had been fomented by the Communist Party of Australia as a challenge to the Labor Party. This caused the rupture of some of his lifelong friendships in the left wing of the union movement. When the Chifley government was defeated in 1949, Holloway, by now 74, retired to the backbench. Frank Crean replaced Holloway as the next member for Melbourne Ports in 1951. He was made a Privy Councillor and retired from Parliament in 1951. He lived in the Melbourne suburb of St Kilda until his death in 1967.

Political offices
New title	Assistant Minister for Industry, Council for Scientific and Industrial Research; 1931	Abolished
Preceded by Frederick Stewart	Minister for Social Services/ Minister for Health; 1941–1943	Succeeded by James Fraser
Preceded by Eddie Ward	Minister for Labour and National Service; 1943–1949	Succeeded by Harold Holt
Parliament of Australia
Preceded by Stanley Bruce	Member for Flinders; 1929–1931	Succeeded by Stanley Bruce
Preceded by James Mathews	Member for Melbourne Ports; 1931–1951	Succeeded by Frank Crean
