= Percy Clarey =

Australian politician (1890–1960)

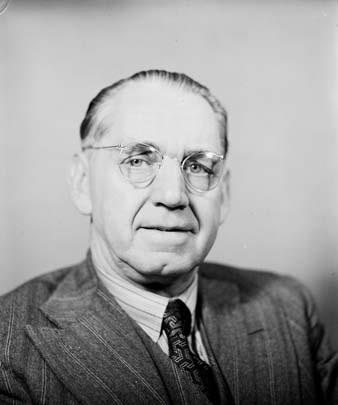

Member of Australian Parliament for Bendigo
- In office 10 December 1949 – 17 May 1960
- Preceded by: George Rankin
- Succeeded by: Noel Beaton

Member of the Victorian Legislative Council for Doutta Galla
- In office 12 June 1937 – 18 June 1949 Serving with Paul Jones
- Preceded by: Electorate established
- Succeeded by: Bill Slater

3rd President of the ACTU
- In office 1943–1949
- Preceded by: Albert Monk
- Succeeded by: Albert Monk

Personal details
- Born: 20 January 1890 Bairnsdale, Victoria Colony, British Empire
- Died: 17 May 1960 (aged 70) Oakleigh, Victoria, Australia
- Party: Labor Party
- Spouses: Katherine Chambers (m. 1917; div. 1936) Florence Midiam Cater (m. 1948)
- Relatives: Arthur Clarey (brother)
- Occupation: Politician

Percy James Clarey (20 January 1890 – 17 May 1960) was an Australian trade union leader and politician. He served as president of the Australian Council of Trade Unions (ACTU) from 1943 to 1949 and represented the Australian Labor Party (ALP) in the Victorian Legislative Council (1937−1949) and Australian House of Representatives (1949−1960).

== Early life ==
Clarey was born at Bairnsdale, Victoria, the fifth child of general agent Francis William Clarey and Jessie Littlejohn Clarey, née Lawson. The family soon moved to Melbourne, and Percy attended South Yarra State School and the Working Men's College. In his youth, Clarey was crippled by rheumatoid arthritis, and walked with crutches for the rest of his life. He joined the labour movement as a teenager and was secretary of the Kensington branch of the ALP. Employed as a clerk, he was Victorian president of the Federated Clerks' Union by the time he was 24 and federal president at 27. He also served as federal president of both the Amalgamated Food Preserving Employees' Union of Australia and the Federated Storemen and Packers' Union of Australia.

Clarey married schoolteacher Katherine Mary Isabel Chambers at Box Hill, Victoria on 31 March 1917. They had two sons before their divorce in 1936. Katherine was also prominent in the labour movement, and was the Labor candidate for the Victorian Legislative Assembly seat of Caulfield in 1935, although she withdrew shortly before the poll.

Meanwhile, Clarey continued to rise in the union movement, being president of the Victorian branch of the Australian Labor Party in 1934 and president of the Melbourne Trades Hall Council in 1935. During World War II, he was on the board of the Department of Munitions and the Manpower Priorities Board, as well as being a delegate to the 1944 International Labour Conference.

== State politics and ACTU presidency ==
In 1937, Clarey was elected to the Victorian Legislative Council, a position he held until 1949. He was minister of labour and public health during 1943 and minister of labour and employment from 1945 to 1947 under the premiership of John Cain. He was criticised for holding the positions of labour minister and President of the Australian Council of Trade Unions simultaneously. He married divorcee Florence Midiam Cater, née Knowles, on 21 August 1948.

As ACTU president, Clarey formed a partnership with his eventual successor, secretary Albert Monk, and resisted the various attempts by the Communist Party of Australia to gain control of the trade unions. He conceded that the Communist Party had a right to exist, but was strenuously opposed to communism in the ALP.

In 1948, Clarey publicly supported the White Australia policy following criticism from the World Council of Churches. He said that allowing non-white immigration would introduce racial tension similar to South Africa and United States and lower the national standard of living, as "Australia does not desire the colored peoples of the world to be brought into this country to be hewers of wood and drawers of water".

== Federal politics ==
In 1949, Clarey transferred to the federal House of Representatives, winning the seat of Bendigo by only 152 votes. He was defeated for the deputy leadership in 1951 by Arthur Calwell, losing by nine votes on the third ballot and outpolling veterans Eddie Ward and Allan Fraser. He was mentioned as a possible successor to the troubled H.V. Evatt as parliamentary leader. Although associated with the right wing of the ALP, Clarey always kept to the party line. He had consistently cordial dealings with Robert Menzies.

Sometimes accused of being a "bosses' man" and a "strike breaker" by union opponents, Clarey was nevertheless a supporter of the Indonesians against Dutch colonialism.

In 1955 he called for the term "white Australia" to be removed from the ALP platform, instead being replaced with the term like "restricted immigration". Clarey visited Israel in the 1950s and subsequently "spoke up on behalf of Israel on many issues" in parliament. He was obituarised in the Australian Jewish News as "a friend of the Jewish community over a period of many years". In 1954, Clarey was sent to New York City as Australia's delegate to the United Nations General Assembly. He also visited China in 1957.

Clarey died on 17 May 1960 in Oakleigh, Victoria. He had been ill since a bout of pneumonia in February 1960. He was survived by the sons of his first marriage. He was given a state funeral before being cremated with Methodist forms. His brother, Arthur Clarey, was the member for Melbourne in the Victorian Legislative Assembly from 1955 to 1972.

Parliament of Australia
Preceded by George Rankin	Member for Bendigo; 1949–1960	Succeeded by Noel Beaton
Trade union offices
Preceded by Albert Monk	President of the Australian Council of Trade Unions; 1943–1949	Succeeded by Albert Monk
