= Nick McKenna =

Australian politician

The Honourable Nick McKenna
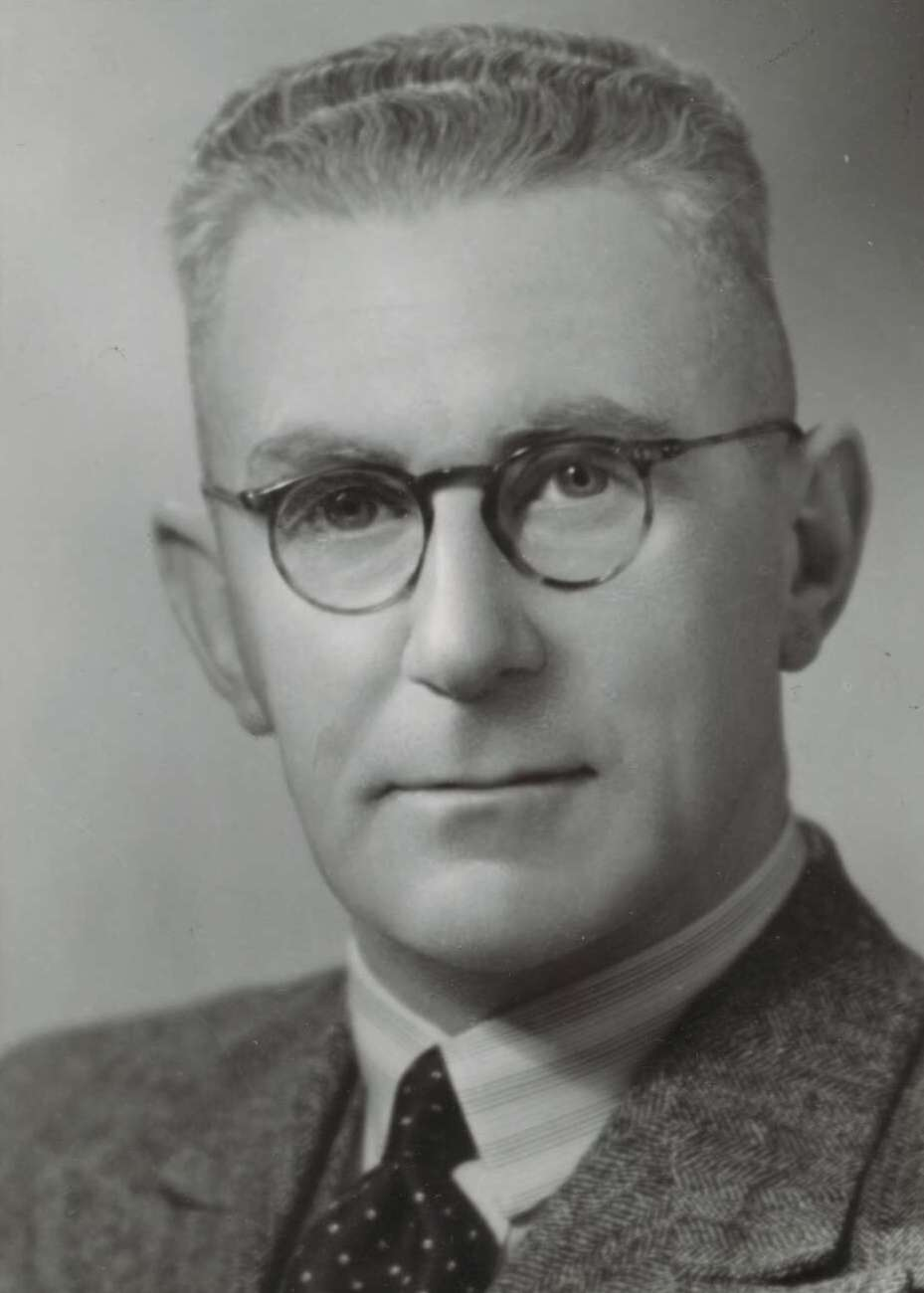

Leader of the Opposition in the Senate
- In office 11 June 1951 – 17 August 1966
- Preceded by: Bill Ashley
- Succeeded by: Don Willesee

Minister for Health
- In office 18 June 1946 – 19 December 1949
- Prime Minister: Ben Chifley
- Preceded by: James Fraser
- Succeeded by: Earle Page

Minister for Social Services
- In office 18 June 1946 – 19 December 1949
- Prime Minister: Ben Chifley
- Preceded by: James Fraser
- Succeeded by: Bill Spooner

Senator for Tasmania
- In office 1 July 1944 – 30 June 1968
- Preceded by: Richard Darcey
- Succeeded by: Ken Wriedt

Personal details
- Born: 9 September 1895 Carlton, Victoria, Australia
- Died: 22 April 1974 (aged 78) Crows Nest, New South Wales, Australia
- Party: Labor

Nicholas Edward McKenna (9 September 1895 – 22 April 1974) was an Australian politician who served as a Senator for Tasmania from 1944 to 1968. He held ministerial office in the Chifley government from 1946 to 1949 as Minister for Health and Minister for Social Services. He was later Leader of the Opposition in the Senate for a record term of 15 years (1951–1966).

== Early life ==
McKenna was born in the Melbourne suburb of Carlton and educated at St. Joseph's Christian Brothers' College, North Melbourne between 1904 and 1912. In 1909 aged 13, McKenna and another boy were instrumental in saving the life of a man floundering in the water off the pier at Elwood. Their local newspaper describing the incident said that, "...they furnish a bright example to other youths."

McKenna excelled in his schooling passing seven subjects in the Senior Public University Examination in 1911 and eventually gaining second place in the national Federal Public Service Examination in 1912.

At age 17 he joined the Commonwealth Public Service in the Auditor General's office. He earned an LL.B. from the University of Melbourne in 1923 and was admitted as a barrister and solicitor in 1928. He moved to Hobart in 1929 and married Kathleen Mary Coghlan in January 1930—they had a son and daughter.

== Political career ==
McKenna was elected as a senator for Tasmania at the 1943 election, representing the Australian Labor Party. He was appointed as Minister for Health and Minister for Social Services in the second Chifley Ministry in November 1946 and held those positions until the defeat of the Chifley government at the 1949 election. He campaigned energetically for the 1946 referendums and, with the passage of the social services proposal, he was in charge of the government's attempt to introduce a national health scheme.

McKenna was leader of the opposition in the Senate from 1951 to 1966. He took an active part in the fight against the banning of the Communist Party of Australia in the 1951 referendum. He considered that it was a high point in his career that Australia has "decided not to become a police state". He retired from the Senate in July 1968.

== Later life ==
McKenna died in 1974 at the Sydney suburb of Crows Nest, New South Wales. He was a Catholic.

Political offices
| Preceded by James Fraser | Minister for Health; 1946–1949 | Succeeded by Earle Page |
| Preceded by James Fraser | Minister for Social Services; 1946–1949 | Succeeded by Bill Spooner |
Party political offices
| Preceded by Bill Ashley | Leader of the Australian Labor Party in the Senate; 1951–1966 | Succeeded by Don Willesee |
