= James Fraser (Western Australian politician) =

Australian politician

The Honourable James Fraser
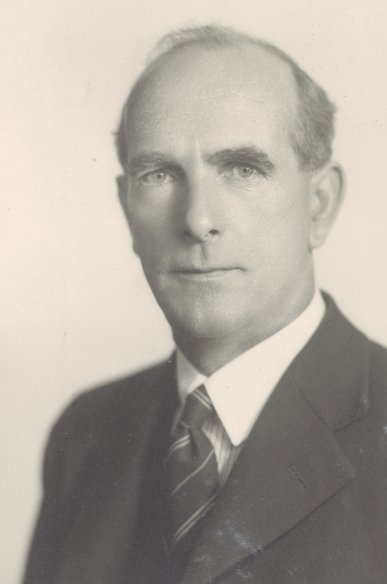

Minister for Trade and Customs
- In office 18 June 1946 – 1 November 1946
- Prime Minister: Ben Chifley
- Preceded by: John Dedman
- Succeeded by: Ben Courtice

Minister for Health
- In office 21 September 1943 – 18 June 1946
- Prime Minister: John Curtin; Frank Forde; Ben Chifley
- Preceded by: Jack Holloway
- Succeeded by: Nick McKenna

Minister for Social Services
- In office 21 September 1943 – 18 June 1946
- Prime Minister: John Curtin; Frank Forde; Ben Chifley
- Preceded by: Jack Holloway
- Succeeded by: Nick McKenna

Minister for External Territories
- In office 7 October 1941 – 21 September 1943
- Prime Minister: John Curtin
- Preceded by: Allan McDonald
- Succeeded by: Eddie Ward

Senator for Western Australia
- In office 1 July 1938 – 30 June 1959

Personal details
- Born: 12 March 1889 Forres, Morayshire, Scotland
- Died: 27 August 1961 (aged 72) Victoria Park, Western Australia, Australia
- Party: Labor
- Spouse: Ellen Simmons (m. 1912)
- Occupation: Tramways worker

James McIntosh Fraser (12 March 1889 – 27 August 1961) was an Australian trade unionist and politician. He was a member of the Australian Labor Party (ALP) and served as a Senator for Western Australia from 1938 to 1959. He held ministerial office in the ALP governments of the 1940s, serving as Minister for External Territories (1941–1943), Social Services (1943–1946), Health (1943–1946), and Trade and Customs (1946).

== Early life ==
Fraser was born in Forres, Morayshire, Scotland and educated locally. He emigrated to Australia and married Ellen Simmons in April 1912 in Perth. He was turned down for military service during World War I and instead returned to a position at the Royal Arsenal in London, where he had worked before emigrating. After the war he returned to Perth as a motorman with the Western Australian Government Tramways and he became an officer of the Tramway Employees' Union.

== Political career ==
Fraser became a member of the State executive of the Australian Labor Party in the 1920s and he was a member of Perth City Council from 1929 to 1937. He was elected to the Senate in the 1937 election. He was appointed Minister for External Territories in the Curtin ministry in October 1941. In September 1943, he became Minister for Health and Minister for Social Services and was responsible for implementing the Labor government's ambitions to expand social security programs. In June 1946, he became Minister for Trade and Customs (losing the Social Services portfolio) on the death of Richard Keane, but was not re-elected to the ministry in November 1946. As a backbencher, he became a forceful critic of Labor leader, H. V. Evatt, whom he regarded as unelectable, and seconded a motion to declare the party's leadership positions vacant in October 1954. He retired from parliament in 1959.

== Personal life ==
Fraser died in the Perth suburb of Victoria Park in 1961, survived by his wife, two sons and one of his two daughters. During World War II, his three sons served in the army. One was captured by the Japanese in the Battle of Singapore and another died as a prisoner of war in Germany.

Political offices
Preceded by Allan McDonald	Minister for External Territories; 1941–1943	Succeeded by Eddie Ward
Preceded by Jack Holloway	Minister for Health; Minister for Social Services; 1943–1946	Succeeded by Nick McKenna
Preceded by John Dedman	Minister for Trade and Customs; 1946	Succeeded by Ben Courtice
