= Leader of the Opposition in the Senate (Australia) =

Political office in the Australian Senate

Leader of the Opposition in the Senate of Australian Senate
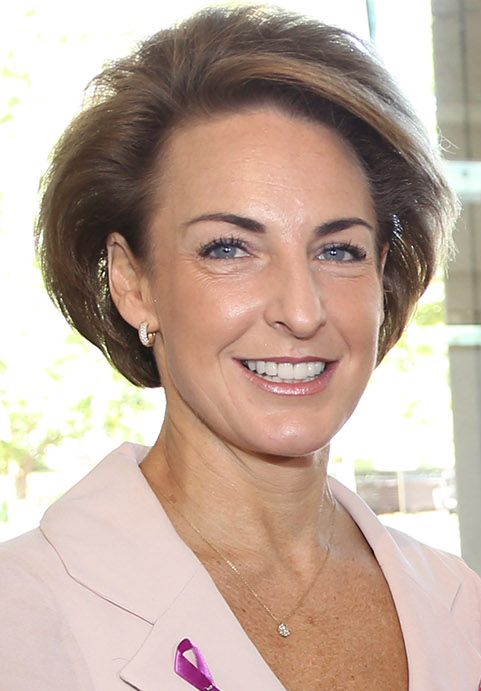
- Incumbent; Michaelia Cash since 25 January 2025
- Style: The Honourable Senator
- Member of: Shadow Cabinet; Opposition
- Appointer: Opposition Party Caucus
- Constituting instrument: Constitution of Australia

The Leader of the Opposition in the Senate is a party office held by the Opposition's most senior member of the Shadow Cabinet in the Australian Senate, elected to lead the opposition party (or parties) in the body. Though the leader in the Senate does not have the power of the office of Leader of the Opposition (i.e. the leader in the House of Representatives and overall party leader), there are some parallels between the latter's status in the lower house and the former's in the Senate. In addition to their own shadow ministerial portfolio, the leader has overarching responsibility for all policy areas and acts as the opposition's principal spokesperson in the upper house. The leader is entitled to sit at the table of the Senate, and has priority in gaining recognition from the President of the Senate to speak in debate. Another similarity is that the leader typically announces changes to opposition officeholders in the Senate, including shadow ministers, party leadership and whips. The leader also has some responsibility for appointing opposition senators to committees, a role filled by the Manager of Opposition Business and whips in the lower house. The current leader is Michaelia Cash, assisted by a Deputy Leader of the Opposition in the Senate, currently Anne Ruston.

== List of leaders of the opposition in the Senate ==
Senate opposition leader	Term began	Term ended	Party	Leader of the Opposition
Josiah Symon	6 June 1901 (Note: Symon was elected the party's leader in the Senate in 1901, when the party was in Opposition. He remained leader when the party was in Government from 1904 to 1905 and when the party again found itself on the Opposition benches.)	18 August 1904	Free Trade	George Reid
Gregor McGregor	18 August 1904 (Note: McGregor was the Labor Party's leader in the Senate (and Deputy Leader of the federal Labor Party) from Federation until the double dissolution that triggered the 1914 election. As such, he held the title Leader of the Senate when in Government, and that of Leader of the Opposition in the Senate whenever Labor formed the Official Opposition during that period.)	5 July 1905	Labor	Chris Watson
Josiah Symon	5 July 1905	21 November 1907	Free Trade	George Reid
Josiah Symon	5 July 1905	21 November 1907	Anti-Socialist	George Reid
Edward Millen	21 November 1907 (Note: Millen succeeded Symon as Leader of the Opposition on 21 November 1907 and became Senate leader of the new Commonwealth Liberal Party, taking up the office of Leader of the Senate upon when the party entered Government on 2 June 1909. He continued as leader of the party in the Senate as it alternated between Government and Opposition.)	2 June 1909	Anti-Socialist	George Reid
Edward Millen	21 November 1907	2 June 1909	Anti-Socialist	Joseph Cook
Edward Millen	21 November 1907	2 June 1909	Commonwealth; Liberal	Alfred Deakin
Gregor McGregor	2 June 1909	29 April 1910	Labor	Andrew Fisher
Edward Millen	29 April 1910	24 June 1913	Commonwealth; Liberal	Alfred Deakin
Edward Millen	29 April 1910	24 June 1913	Commonwealth; Liberal	Joseph Cook
Gregor McGregor	24 June 1913	30 July 1914	Labor	Andrew Fisher
Edward Millen	30 July 1914	14 February 1917 (Note: After Billy Hughes, the Prime Minister, split with the Labor Party in November 1916, his new National Labor Party Government survived with the help of the Commonwealth Liberal Party. The latter remained, technically, in Opposition for the time being. Therefore, until National Labor and the Liberals formed a coalition government on 14 February 1017, Millen remained Leader of the Opposition. Gardiner was Leader of the Opposition from 14 February and was referred to as such in the Senate that day.)	Commonwealth; Liberal	Joseph Cook
Albert Gardiner (Note: Gardiner's tenure includes a period from 1 July 1920 to 26 May 1922 in which he was Labor's sole senator, but he was still considered Leader of the Opposition.)	17 February 1917	30 June 1926	Labor	Frank Tudor
Albert Gardiner	17 February 1917	30 June 1926	Labor	Matthew Charlton
Ted Needham	9 July 1926	25 June 1929	Labor	Matthew Charlton
Ted Needham	9 July 1926	25 June 1929	Labor	James Scullin
John Daly	25 June 1929	22 October 1929	Labor	James Scullin
George Pearce	22 October 1929 (Note: Pearce was leader of the Nationalist Party in the Senate while it was in Government, and he continued in the role after the party entered Opposition. He was elected Senate leader of the new United Australia Party when it was created as a merger of the Nationalists, other anti-Labor parties, and some Labor MPs.)	6 January 1932	Nationalist	John Latham
George Pearce	22 October 1929	6 January 1932	United; Australia	Joseph Lyons
John Barnes	6 January 1932 (Note: Barnes was Labor's Senate leader before it left Government, and he continued as leader afterwards.)	30 June 1935	Labor	James Scullin
Joe Collings	1 July 1935	7 October 1941	Labor	James Scullin
Joe Collings	1 July 1935	7 October 1941	Labor	John Curtin
George McLeay	7 October 1941 (Note: McLeay was the UAP leader in the Senate in Government, and continued as leader after the UAP–Country coalition fell.)	31 May 1947	UAP	Arthur Fadden
George McLeay	7 October 1941	31 May 1947	UAP	Robert Menzies (Note: The UAP/Liberals and Country Party did not form a coalition opposition from 1943 to 1949 in the House of Representatives. However, from 1 July 1947 until the parties won government in 1949, the Senate parties formed a combined opposition because the Country senator and two Liberal senators were the only non-Labor members of the upper house. Cooper served as leader, Neil O'Sullivan as deputy, and Annabelle Rankin as whip.)
George McLeay	7 October 1941	31 May 1947	Liberal	Robert Menzies
Walter Cooper	1 June 1947	19 November 1949	Country	Robert Menzies
Bill Ashley	19 December 1949 (Note: Ashley was Leader of the Government in the Senate until the Menzies Government took power. He continued as Labor's leader in the Senate.)	11 June 1951	Labor	Chifley
Nick McKenna	11 June 1951	17 August 1966	Labor	Chifley
Nick McKenna	11 June 1951	17 August 1966	Labor	H. V. Evatt
Nick McKenna	11 June 1951	17 August 1966	Labor	Arthur Calwell
Don Willesee	17 August 1966	8 February 1967	Labor	Arthur Calwell
Don Willesee	17 August 1966	8 February 1967	Labor	Gough Whitlam
Lionel Murphy	8 February 1967	5 December 1972	Labor	Gough Whitlam
Reg Withers	20 December 1972	11 November 1975	Liberal	Billy Snedden
Reg Withers	20 December 1972	11 November 1975	Liberal	Malcolm Fraser
Ken Wriedt	11 November 1975 (Note: Wriedt was Leader of the Government prior to the Dismissal, and continued as Labor's leader thereafter.)	28 September 1980 (Note: Resigned from the Senate while leader to seek a seat in the House of Representatives.)	Labor	Gough Whitlam
Ken Wriedt	11 November 1975	28 September 1980	Labor	Bill Hayden
John Button	7 November 1980	11 March 1983	Labor	Bill Hayden
John Button	7 November 1980	11 March 1983	Labor	Bob Hawke
Fred Chaney	11 March 1983	27 February 1990	Liberal	Andrew Peacock
Fred Chaney	11 March 1983	27 February 1990	Liberal	John Howard
Fred Chaney	11 March 1983	27 February 1990	Liberal	Andrew Peacock
Robert Hill	3 April 1990	11 March 1996	Liberal	John Hewson
Robert Hill	3 April 1990	11 March 1996	Liberal	Alexander Downer
Robert Hill	3 April 1990	11 March 1996	Liberal	John Howard
John Faulkner	19 March 1996	22 October 2004	Labor	Kim Beazley
John Faulkner	19 March 1996	22 October 2004	Labor	Simon Crean
John Faulkner	19 March 1996	22 October 2004	Labor	Mark Latham
Chris Evans	22 October 2004	3 December 2007	Labor	Mark Latham
Chris Evans	22 October 2004	3 December 2007	Labor	Kim Beazley
Chris Evans	22 October 2004	3 December 2007	Labor	Kevin Rudd
Nick Minchin	3 December 2007	3 May 2010	Liberal	Brendan Nelson
Nick Minchin	3 December 2007	3 May 2010	Liberal	Malcolm Turnbull
Nick Minchin	3 December 2007	3 May 2010	Liberal	Tony Abbott
Eric Abetz	3 May 2010	18 September 2013	Liberal	Tony Abbott
Penny Wong	18 September 2013	23 May 2022	Labor	Chris Bowen
Penny Wong	18 September 2013	23 May 2022	Labor	Bill Shorten
Penny Wong	18 September 2013	23 May 2022	Labor	Anthony Albanese
Simon Birmingham	23 May 2022	25 January 2025	Liberal	Peter Dutton
Michaelia Cash	25 January 2025	Incumbent	Liberal	Peter Dutton
Michaelia Cash	25 January 2025	Incumbent	Liberal	Sussan Ley
Michaelia Cash	25 January 2025	Incumbent	Liberal	Angus Taylor

== See also ==
- Leader of the Government in the Senate (Australia)
- Manager of Opposition Business in the Senate
