= Ben Courtice =

Australian politician

The Honourable Ben Courtice
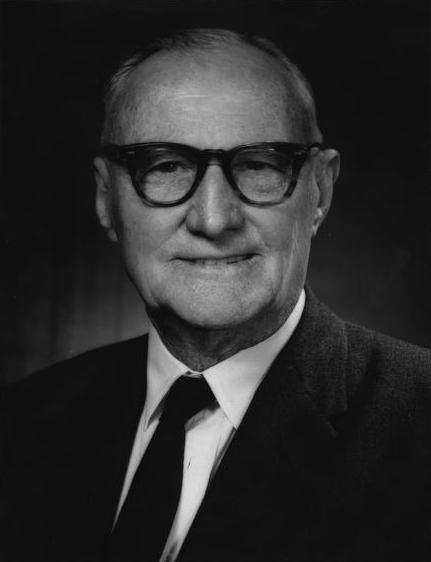

Minister for Trade and Customs
- In office 1 November 1946 – 19 December 1949
- Prime Minister: Ben Chifley
- Preceded by: James Fraser
- Succeeded by: Neil O'Sullivan

Senator for Queensland
- In office 2 September 1937 – 30 June 1962

Personal details
- Born: 14 February 1881 Bundaberg, Queensland, Australia
- Died: 7 January 1972 (aged 90) Bundaberg, Queensland, Australia
- Party: Labor
- Spouse(s): 1) Bertha Demaine; 2) Elsie Dora Maud Joyner
- Relations: Brian Courtice (nephew)
- Occupation: Farmer

Benjamin Courtice (14 February 1881 – 7 January 1972) was an Australian politician who served as a Senator for Queensland from 1937 to 1962. He served as Minister for Trade and Customs under Ben Chifley from 1946 to 1949.

== Early life ==
Courtice was born in Bundaberg and was educated at Bundaberg South State School. He left school at twelve to work in the laboratory of the Millaquin sugar refinery at Bundaberg. In 1905 he was involved in the formation of the Bundaberg and District Workers' Union, which later became part of the Australian Workers' Union. He married Bertha Demaine in 1910 and they had a son and three daughters before her death in 1925. Courtice won £90 for winning a foot-race at about the time of his marriage and used it to buy a sugar farm and he subsequently became a member of various sugar growers organisations. In 1936, he married Elsie Dora Maud Joyner.

== Political career ==
Courtice's older brother Frederick Courtice was a member of the Queensland Legislative Council for the Labor Party, participating in the vote to abolish the council in 1922. Ben Courtice was appointed to a casual vacancy in the Australian Senate in 1937. He served as Chairman of Committees from 1943 to 1946, resigning to become Minister for Trade and Customs in the second Chifley Ministry. He served in cabinet from November 1946 until Labor's defeat at the 1949 election. Courtice retired from the Senate at the end of his term in June 1962. He died in Bundaberg, survived by the children of his first marriage. His nephew, Brian Courtice, was later elected to the House of Representatives.

== Notes ==
Political offices
Preceded by James Fraser	Minister for Trade and Customs; 1946–49	Succeeded by Neil O'Sullivan
