= Division of Melbourne Ports =

Former Australian federal electoral division

Coordinates: 37.856°S 144.976°E

Melbourne Ports Australian House of Representatives Division
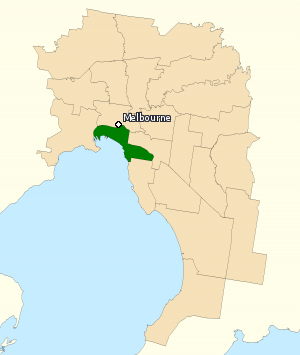
- Division of Melbourne Ports in Victoria, as of the 2016 federal election
- Created: 1901
- Abolished: 2019
- Namesake: Port Melbourne
- Electors: 102,283 (2016)
- Area: 40 km^{2} (15.4 sq mi)
- Demographic: Inner metropolitan

The Division of Melbourne Ports was an Australian federal electoral division in the inner south-eastern suburbs of Melbourne, Victoria, Australia. It was located to the south of Melbourne's central business district and covered an area of approximately 40 km^{2} around the north and north-eastern shores of Port Phillip Bay.

The electorate was created at the time of Australian Federation in 1901 and was one of the original 65 divisions contested at the first federal election. It is named for the fact that, at the time of its creation, it was centred on Port Melbourne and Williamstown, both major ports.

The electorate, formerly working class, was much more demographically diverse on its final boundaries, with rapidly accelerating inner-city gentrification and high-density housing developments in later years. It included Port Melbourne, but also included a number of middle and upper middle class suburbs such as Albert Park, Balaclava, Caulfield, Elwood, Middle Park, Ripponlea, South Melbourne and St Kilda. It was notable for having one of Australia's larger Jewish populations, at 9.9%, much higher than the nationwide 0.4%. It also had a high proportion of atheists and agnostics, with 38.8% of residents answering "No Religion" in the 2016 census, compared to 30.1% nationwide. It also had a large gay and lesbian community.

== History ==
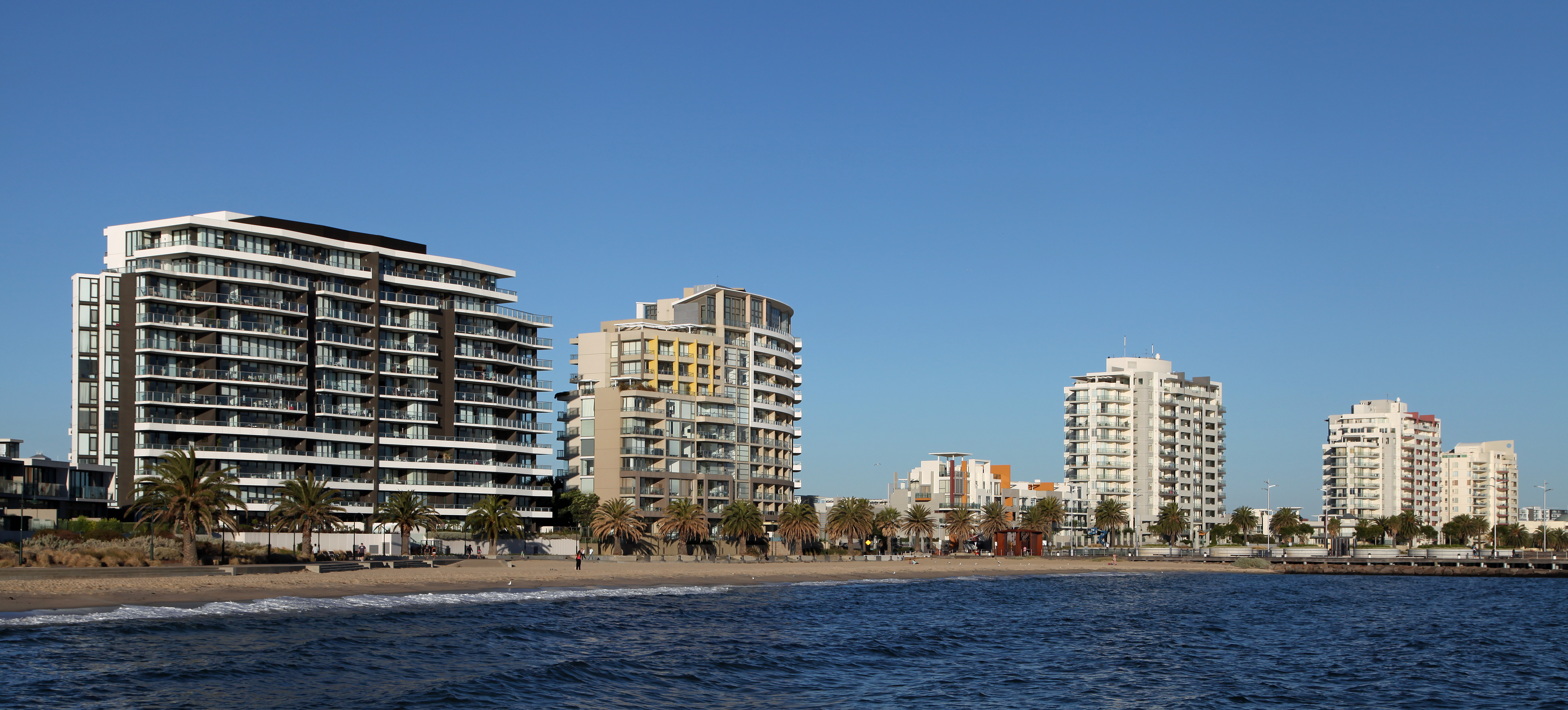
The suburb of Port Melbourne, the division's namesake

Melbourne Ports was held by the Australian Labor Party from 1906 until 2019, when it was renamed. During this period it was held by only five members, all men, most notably Jack Holloway, a minister who served under John Curtin and Ben Chifley; Frank Crean, Treasurer and then Deputy Prime Minister in the Whitlam government; and Clyde Holding, a minister in the Hawke government who prior to switching to federal politics had served as Victorian Opposition Leader from 1967 to 1977.

Originally, it was anchored in the industrial suburbs in the west of the electorate, which are part of Labor's heartland in west Melbourne. On those boundaries, for decades it was one of the safest Labor seats in the country, and Labor usually easily retained it even when Labor was heavily defeated nationally. The only times Labor's hold on the seat was even remotely threatened during this era came in 1975 and 1977; even then, Labor's primary vote was enough to retain the seat outright.

After it was extended eastwards to Caulfield and other Liberal-voting areas in the 1990 redistribution, it became much less secure for Labor. Continuing the gradual downwards trend in the Labor primary vote, in the 2013 election, Labor was returned with a primary vote of less than 32 percent. In 2016, Labor actually suffered a primary vote swing of four percent and a two-party swing of two percent even as it nearly reduced the Coalition to minority government nationally.

In 2018, the Australian Electoral Commission proposed renaming Melbourne Ports as Macnamara, after medical scientist Dame Jean Macnamara. The new name was gazetted on 13 July 2018, and was first used at the 2019 federal election.

== Members ==
Image	Member	Party	Term	Notes
	Samuel Mauger (1857–1936)	Protectionist	29 March 1901 – 12 December 1906	Previously held the Victorian Legislative Assembly seat of Footscray. Transferred to the Division of Maribyrnong
	James Mathews (1865–1934)	Labor	12 December 1906 – 27 November 1931	Retired
	Jack Holloway (1875–1967)	Labor	19 December 1931 – 19 March 1951	Previously held the Division of Flinders. Served as minister under Curtin, Forde and Chifley. Retired
	Frank Crean (1916–2008)	Labor	28 April 1951 – 10 November 1977	Previously held the Victorian Legislative Assembly seat of Prahran. Served as minister and Deputy Prime Minister under Whitlam. Retired
	Clyde Holding (1931–2011)	Labor	10 December 1977 – 31 August 1998	Previously held the Victorian Legislative Assembly seat of Richmond. Served as minister under Hawke. Retired
	Michael Danby (1955–)	Labor	3 October 1998 – 11 April 2019	Retired after Melbourne Ports was abolished in 2019

== Election results ==
2016 Australian federal election: Melbourne Ports
Party	Candidate	Votes	%	±%
Liberal	Owen Guest	35,533	41.90	+0.85
Labor	Michael Danby	22,897	27.00	−4.67
Greens	Steph Hodgins-May	20,179	23.79	+3.62
Animal Justice	Robert Smyth	1,685	1.99	+1.99
Independent	Peter Holland	1,393	1.64	+1.64
Marriage Equality	Henry von Doussa	1,349	1.59	+1.59
Drug Law Reform	Levi McKenzie-Kirkbright	1,348	1.59	+1.59
Independent	John Myers	425	0.50	+0.50
Total formal votes		84,809	95.76	−0.42
Informal votes		3,756	4.24	+0.42
Turnout		88,565	86.59	−3.45
Two-party-preferred result
Labor	Michael Danby	43,573	51.38	−2.18
Liberal	Owen Guest	41,236	48.62	+2.18
Labor hold		Swing	−2.18	
