= Allan Fraser (Australian politician) =

Australian politician and journalist

Allan Fraser CMG
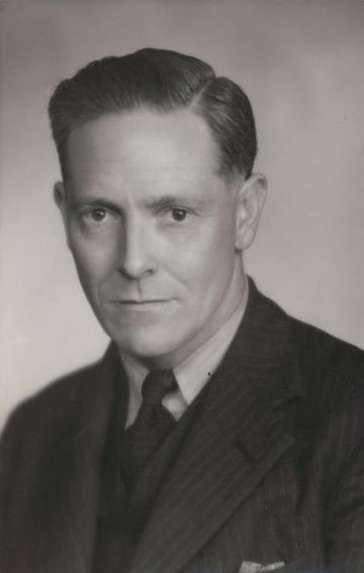

Member of the Australian Parliament for Eden-Monaro
- In office 21 August 1943 – 26 November 1966
- Preceded by: John Perkins
- Succeeded by: Dugald Munro
- In office 25 October 1969 – 2 November 1972
- Preceded by: Dugald Munro
- Succeeded by: Bob Whan

Personal details
- Born: 18 September 1902 Carlton, Melbourne, Victoria, Australia
- Died: 12 December 1977 (aged 75) Canberra, ACT, Australia
- Party: Labor
- Spouse: Eda Kathleen Bourke
- Relations: Jim (brother)
- Children: 1
- Occupation: Journalist; Politician

Allan Duncan Fraser CMG (18 September 1902 – 12 December 1977) was an Australian politician and journalist. He served as a member of the House of Representatives from 1943 to 1966 and from 1969 to 1972, representing the Division of Eden-Monaro for the Labor Party.

== Early life ==
Fraser was born in the Melbourne suburb of Carlton and brought up in Tasmania. He left State High School, Hobart at 17 to become a journalist on the Hobart Mercury. He worked for the Argus in Melbourne from 1922 to 1929 when he moved to Canberra to work for The Sun. He married Eda Kathleen Bourke in 1931. In 1933, he worked for The Times in London, before returning to Australia to work for the Sun and the Sydney Daily Telegraph, but was sacked in 1938. Bob Heffron, the leader of the Industrial Labor Party, which had broken from the New South Wales branch of the Australian Labor Party led by Jack Lang, appointed him as his secretary. He acted as Heffron's media officer and helped formulate the strategy that overcame Lang's control of the branch. He subsequently worked as news editor on the Daily News and then returned to the Canberra parliamentary press gallery in 1940 as political correspondent for Ezra Norton's Truth and from 1941 Norton's new Daily Mirror.

Fraser was active in the Australian Journalists Association and had been secretary, treasurer and president of its Victorian district between 1926 and 1929 and treasurer of the New South Wales district from 1937 to 1938. Between 1941 and 1944 he was president of the Canberra sub-district of the AJA.

== Political career ==
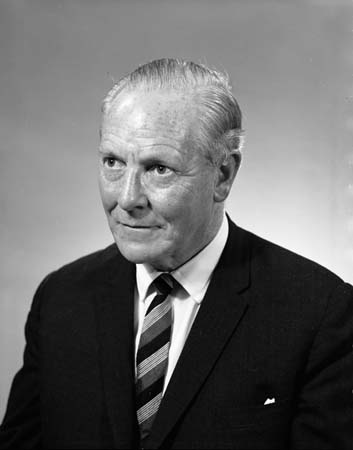
Fraser in 1965.

1970 ABC interview with Robert Menzies and Allan Fraser, discussing their recollections of the Petrov Affair.

In 1943, Fraser beat Jessie Street for Labor preselection for Eden-Monaro. He entered federal parliament at the 1943 election, which gave John Curtin's ALP government a large majority. A split in the conservative vote knocked United Australia Party incumbent John Perkins into third place, allowing Fraser to become only the second Labor member ever to win the seat. He was one of four candidates for the party's deputy leadership in 1951, but was eliminated on the first ballot after polling only nine votes out of 81.

Fraser tended to be independent and at times critical of his party. In particular, he condemned H. V. Evatt in relation to his handling of the Industrial Groups and the 1954 Labor Party split (although he himself was no Grouper). After Labor's defeat in 1955 Fraser stood against Evatt for the leadership, but lost 58 to 20 and lost his high ranking in caucus' executive. He later became increasingly interested in foreign affairs and was particularly critical of Australia's involvement in the Vietnam War. In the 1966 election Labor's opposition to the war led to its being vanquished in a landslide, and Fraser lost his seat to Liberal challenger Dugald Munro. He regained it in 1969, when the war had become less popular and a strong swing to Labor nearly allowed it to win government. He retired at the 1972 election, when the Whitlam government came to power.

In 1974, Fraser won a seat in Fraser (named after his brother Jim) as an independent in the original Australian Capital Territory Legislative Assembly and was, in consequence, expelled from the Labor Party. He died at Royal Canberra Hospital on 12 December 1977, two days after the 1977 federal election, following several years of heart trouble. He was survived by his wife and son. His brother, Jim Fraser, was MP for the adjoining seat of Australian Capital Territory from 1951 to 1970.

== Honours ==
He was a made a Commander of the Order of St Michael and St George in 1977.

== Notes ==
Parliament of Australia
Preceded by John Perkins	Member for Eden-Monaro; 1943–1966	Succeeded by Dugald Munro
Preceded by Dugald Munro	Member for Eden-Monaro; 1969–1972	Succeeded by Bob Whan
