= Members of the Australian Senate, 1950–1951 =

Senate composition at 1 July 1950
Government (26) - (5 seat minority)
Liberal (21)
Country Party (5)

Opposition (34)
Labor (34)

This is a list of members of the Australian Senate from 1 July 1950 to 28 April 1951. The Senate was expanded from 36 to 60 seats as a result of legislation passed in 1948, which came into effect on 22 February 1950. The membership of the newly expanded Senate broke down as follows:

- 18 of its members (3 for each state) were elected at the 28 September 1946 election, the last election under the plurality-at-large voting system where the Australian Labor Party had won 15 of the 18 seats. These senators had terms starting on 1 July 1947 and due to finish on 30 June 1953.
- 42 of its members (7 for each state) were elected at the 10 December 1949 election, which was the first election conducted with a single transferable vote under a proportional voting system. The senators were divided into two classes:
  - 30 of its members (5 for each state) had terms starting on 1 July 1950 and due to finish on 30 June 1956. The 18 senators elected in the 21 August 1943 election served until their terms ended on 30 June 1950.
  - 12 of its members (2 for each state) had terms starting on 22 February 1950 (the day the term of the House of Representatives began) and due to finish on 30 June 1953.

Labor retained a Senate majority at the election. The Senate was dissolved for the 1951 election, which was a double dissolution. Labor has not held a Senate majority since.

Senator	Party	State	Term ending	Years in office
Stan Amour	Labor	New South Wales	1953	1938–1965
John Armstrong	Labor	New South Wales	1956	1938–1962
James Arnold	Labor	New South Wales	1953	1941–1965
Bill Ashley	Labor	New South Wales	1953	1938–1962
Bill Aylett	Labor	Tasmania	1956	1938–1965
Fred Beerworth	Labor	South Australia	1953	1946–1951
Archie Benn	Labor	Queensland	1956	1950–1968
Gordon Brown (Note: Father of the Senate)	Labor	Queensland	1953	1932–1965
Don Cameron	Labor	Victoria	1956	1938–1962
George Cole	Labor	Tasmania	1953 (Note: Term commenced on 22 February 1950, with expansion of Parliament.)	1950–1965
Joe Cooke	Labor	Western Australia	1953	1947–1951, 1952–1965
Walter Cooper	Country	Queensland	1953	1928–1932, 1935–1968
Ben Courtice	Labor	Queensland	1956	1937–1962
Jack Critchley	Labor	South Australia	1953	1947–1959
Jack Devlin	Labor	Victoria	1956	1946–1957
Alex Finlay	Labor	South Australia	1956	1944–1953
James Fraser	Labor	Western Australia	1956	1938–1959
John Gorton	Liberal	Victoria	1956	1950–1968
Donald Grant	Labor	New South Wales	1956	1944–1959
Allan Guy	Liberal	Tasmania	1956	1950–1956
Clive Hannaford	Liberal	South Australia	1953	1950–1967
John Harris	Labor	Western Australia	1953	1947–1951, 1953–1959
Bert Hendrickson	Labor	Victoria	1953	1947–1971
Denham Henty	Liberal	Tasmania	1956	1950–1968
Fred Katz	Labor	Victoria	1953	1947–1951
Roy Kendall	Liberal	Queensland	1956	1950–1965
William Large	Labor	New South Wales	1953	1941–1951
Ted Maher	Country	Queensland	1956	1950–1965
Ted Mattner	Liberal	South Australia	1956	1944–1946, 1950–1968
John McCallum	Liberal	New South Wales	1956	1950–1962
Nick McKenna	Labor	Tasmania	1956	1944–1968
George McLeay	Liberal	South Australia	1956	1935–1947, 1950–1955
Bill Morrow	Labor	Tasmania	1953	1947–1953
Reg Murray	Labor	Tasmania	1953	1947–1951
Richard Nash	Labor	Western Australia	1956	1943–1951
Theo Nicholls	Labor	South Australia	1956	1944–1968
Justin O'Byrne	Labor	Tasmania	1953	1946–1981
Sid O'Flaherty	Labor	South Australia	1956	1944–1962
Neil O'Sullivan	Liberal	Queensland	1953	1947–1962
Edmund Piesse	Country	Western Australia	1956	1950–1952
Dame Annabelle Rankin	Liberal	Queensland	1953	1947–1971
George Rankin	Country	Victoria	1956	1950–1956
Albert Reid	Country	New South Wales	1956	1950–1962
Agnes Robertson	Liberal	Western Australia	1956	1950–1962
John Ryan	Labor	South Australia	1953	1950–1959
Charles Sandford	Labor	Victoria	1953	1947–1956, 1957–1966
Malcolm Scott	Liberal	Western Australia	1953	1950–1971
Jim Sheehan	Labor	Victoria	1953	1938–1940, 1944–1962
Wilfrid Simmonds	Liberal	Queensland	1953	1950–1951
John Spicer	Liberal	Victoria	1956	1940–1944, 1950–1956
Bill Spooner	Liberal	New South Wales	1956	1950–1965
Dame Dorothy Tangney	Labor	Western Australia	1953	1943–1968
John Tate	Liberal	New South Wales	1953	1950–1953
Seddon Vincent	Liberal	Western Australia	1956	1950–1964
Frederick Ward	Labor	South Australia	1953	1947–1951
Dame Ivy Wedgwood	Liberal	Victoria	1953	1950–1971
Don Willesee	Labor	Western Australia	1953	1950–1975
Ian Wood	Liberal	Queensland	1956	1950–1978
Robert Wordsworth	Liberal	Tasmania	1953	1950–1959
Reg Wright	Liberal	Tasmania	1956	1950–1978
