= Members of the Australian Senate, 1947–1950 =

Senate composition at 1 July 1947
Government (33) - (14 seat majority)
Labor (33)

Opposition (3)
Liberal (2)
Country Party (1)

Senate composition at 22 February 1950
Government (36) - (5 seat majority)
Labor (36)

Opposition (24)
Liberal (19)
Country Party (5)

This is a list of members of the Australian Senate from 1 July 1947 to 30 June 1950. Half of its members were elected at the 21 August 1943 election and had terms starting on 1 July 1944 and finishing on 30 June 1947; the other half were elected at the 28 September 1946 election and had terms starting on 1 July 1947 and finishing on 30 June 1953.

All senators elected at the 1943 election and 15 of the 18 elected (representing all states except Queensland) represented the Australian Labor Party, leading to the strongest single party domination in any Australian Senate. The plurality-at-large voting system used before the 1949 election meant that the winning party (or coalition) ticket usually took all seats in each state.

The Senate was expanded from 36 to 60 seats as a result of legislation passed in 1948. 1949 was the first senate election conducted with a single transferable vote under a proportional voting system. As before, the Senators were elected in state-wide or territory-wide districts.

The new senators took their seats on 22 February 1950. The membership of the newly expanded Senate broke down as follows:

- 12 of its members (2 for each state) had terms starting on 22 February 1950 (the day the term of the House of Representatives began) and due to finish on 30 June 1953.
- 12 of its members (2 for each state) had terms starting on 22 February 1950 (the day the term of the House of Representatives began) and due to finish on 30 June 1956.

While the introduction of new senators decreased the Labor dominance of the senate, Labor retained a Senate majority.

| Senator | Party | State | Term ending | Years in office |
|---|---|---|---|---|
| Stan Amour | Labor | New South Wales | 1950 | 1938–1965 |
| John Armstrong | Labor | New South Wales | 1950 | 1938–1962 |
| James Arnold | Labor | New South Wales | 1953 | 1941–1965 |
| Bill Ashley | Labor | New South Wales | 1953 | 1938–1962 |
| Bill Aylett | Labor | Tasmania | 1950 | 1938–1965 |
| Fred Beerworth | Labor | South Australia | 1953 | 1946–1951 |
| Gordon Brown (Note: Father of the Senate) | Labor | Queensland | 1950 | 1932–1965 |
| Don Cameron | Labor | Victoria | 1950 | 1938–1962 |
| Robert Clothier | Labor | Western Australia | 1950 | 1943–1968 |
| George Cole | Labor | Tasmania | 1953 (Note: Term commenced on 22 February 1950, with expansion of Parliament.) | 1950–1965 |
| Joe Collings | Labor | Queensland | 1950 | 1932–1950 |
| Joe Cooke | Labor | Western Australia | 1953 | 1947–1951, 1952–1965 |
| Walter Cooper | Country | Queensland | 1953 | 1928–1932, 1935–1968 |
| Ben Courtice | Labor | Queensland | 1950 | 1937–1962 |
| Jack Critchley | Labor | South Australia | 1953 | 1947–1959 |
| Jack Devlin | Labor | Victoria | 1950 | 1946–1957 |
| Alex Finlay | Labor | South Australia | 1950 | 1944–1953 |
| James Fraser | Labor | Western Australia | 1950 | 1938–1959 |
| John Gorton | Liberal | Victoria | 1956 | 1950–1968 |
| Donald Grant | Labor | New South Wales | 1950 | 1944–1959 |
| Allan Guy | Liberal | Tasmania | 1956 | 1950–1956 |
| Clive Hannaford | Liberal | South Australia | 1953 | 1950–1967 |
| John Harris | Labor | Western Australia | 1953 | 1947–1951, 1953–1959 |
| Bert Hendrickson | Labor | Victoria | 1953 | 1947–1971 |
| Fred Katz | Labor | Victoria | 1953 | 1947–1951 |
| Roy Kendall | Liberal | Queensland | 1956 | 1950–1965 |
| Charles Lamp | Labor | Tasmania | 1950 | 1938–1950 |
| William Large | Labor | New South Wales | 1953 | 1941–1951 |
| Ted Maher | Country | Queensland | 1956 | 1950–1965 |
| Ted Mattner | Liberal | South Australia | 1956 | 1944–1946, 1950–1968 |
| John McCallum | Liberal | New South Wales | 1956 | 1950–1962 |
| Nick McKenna | Labor | Tasmania | 1950 | 1944–1968 |
| George McLeay | Liberal | South Australia | 1956 | 1935–1947, 1950–1955 |
| Bill Morrow | Labor | Tasmania | 1953 | 1947–1953 |
| Reg Murray | Labor | Tasmania | 1953 | 1947–1951 |
| Richard Nash | Labor | Western Australia | 1950 | 1943–1951 |
| Theo Nicholls | Labor | South Australia | 1950 | 1944–1968 |
| Justin O'Byrne | Labor | Tasmania | 1953 | 1947–1981 |
| Sid O'Flaherty | Labor | South Australia | 1950 | 1944–1962 |
| Neil O'Sullivan | Liberal | Queensland | 1953 | 1947–1962 |
| Edmund Piesse | Country | Western Australia | 1956 | 1950–1952 |
| Dame Annabelle Rankin | Liberal | Queensland | 1953 | 1947–1971 |
| George Rankin | Country | Victoria | 1956 | 1950–1956 |
| Albert Reid | Country | New South Wales | 1956 | 1950–1962 |
| Agnes Robertson | Liberal | Western Australia | 1956 | 1950–1962 |
| John Ryan | Labor | South Australia | 1953 | 1950–1959 |
| Charles Sandford | Labor | Victoria | 1953 | 1947–1956, 1957–1966 |
| Malcolm Scott | Liberal | Western Australia | 1953 | 1950–1971 |
| Jim Sheehan | Labor | Victoria | 1950 | 1938–1940, 1944–1962 |
| Wilfrid Simmonds | Liberal | Queensland | 1953 | 1950–1951 |
| John Spicer | Liberal | Victoria | 1956 | 1940–1944, 1950–1956 |
| Bill Spooner | Liberal | New South Wales | 1956 | 1950–1965 |
| Dame Dorothy Tangney | Labor | Western Australia | 1953 | 1943–1968 |
| John Tate | Liberal | New South Wales | 1953 | 1950–1953 |
| Frederick Ward | Labor | South Australia | 1953 | 1947–1951 |
| Dame Ivy Wedgwood | Liberal | Victoria | 1953 | 1950–1971 |
| Don Willesee | Labor | Western Australia | 1953 | 1950–1975 |
| Ian Wood | Liberal | Queensland | 1956 | 1950–1978 |
| Robert Wordsworth | Liberal | Tasmania | 1953 | 1950–1959 |
| Reg Wright | Liberal | Tasmania | 1956 | 1950–1978 |
