= Members of the Australian Senate, 1944–1947 =

List of members of the Australian Senate (1944-1947)

Senate composition at 1 July 1944
Government (22) - (3 seat majority)
Labor (22) (Note: Labor Senator Richard Keane died in April 1946 and was replaced by Country Party member Alexander Fraser. The seat returned to Labor at the September 1946 election, when Fraser was defeated by Labor candidate Jack Devlin.)

Opposition (14)
United Australia Party (12) (Note: At the September 1946 election UAP Senator Ted Mattner was defeated for a casual vacancy by Labor candidate Fred Beerworth.)
Country Party (2)

Changes in composition

This is a list of members of the Australian Senate from 1944 to 1947. Half of its members were elected at the 21 September 1940 election and had terms starting on 1 July 1941 and finishing on 30 June 1947; the other half were elected at the 21 August 1943 election and had terms starting on 1 July 1944 and finishing on 30 June 1950. The process for filling casual vacancies was complex. While senators were elected for a six-year term, people appointed to a casual vacancy only held office until the earlier of the next election for the House of Representatives or the Senate.

On 21 February 1945, Robert Menzies announced that the parliamentary United Australia Party had been dissolved and replaced by the newly established Liberal Party.

| Senator | Party | State | Term ending | Years in office |
|---|---|---|---|---|
| Stan Amour | Labor | New South Wales | 1950 | 1938–1965 |
| John Armstrong | Labor | New South Wales | 1950 | 1938–1962 |
| James Arnold | Labor | New South Wales | 1947 | 1941–1965 |
| Bill Ashley | Labor | New South Wales | 1947 | 1938–1962 |
| Bill Aylett | Labor | Tasmania | 1950 | 1938–1965 |
| Fred Beerworth (Note: UAP Senator Oliver Uppill resigned on 16 September 1944; UAP member Ted Mattner was appointed to replace him on 10 October, with his term expiring at the 28 September 1946 election, when he was defeated by Labor candidate Fred Beerworth for the vacancy expiring on 30 June 1947.) | Labor | South Australia | 1947 | 1946–1951 |
| Charles Brand | United Australia/Liberal | Victoria | 1947 | 1935–1947 |
| Gordon Brown | Labor | Queensland | 1950 | 1932–1965 |
| Don Cameron | Labor | Victoria | 1950 | 1938–1962 |
| Robert Clothier | Labor | Western Australia | 1950 | 1943–1968 |
| Herbert Collett | United Australia/Liberal | Western Australia | 1947 | 1933–1947 |
| Joe Collings | Labor | Queensland | 1950 | 1932–1950 |
| Walter Cooper | Country | Queensland | 1947 | 1928–1932, 1935–1968 |
| Ben Courtice | Labor | Queensland | 1950 | 1937–1962 |
| Thomas Crawford (Note: Father of the Senate) | United Australia/Liberal | Queensland | 1947 | 1917–1947 |
| Jack Devlin (Note: Labor Senator Richard Keane died on 26 April 1946; Country Party member Alexander Fraser was appointed to replace him on 15 May, with his term expiring at the 28 September 1946 election, when he was defeated by Labor candidate Jack Devlin for the vacancy expiring on 30 June 1950.) | Labor | Victoria | 1950 | 1946–1957 |
| Alex Finlay | Labor | South Australia | 1950 | 1944–1953 |
| Harry Foll | United Australia/Liberal | Queensland | 1947 | 1917–1947 |
| Alexander Fraser | Country | Victoria | 1946 (Note: Appointed to a casual vacancy and only held office until the earlier of the next election for the House of Representatives or the Senate.) | 1946 |
| James Fraser | Labor | Western Australia | 1950 | 1938–1959 |
| William Gibson | Country | Victoria | 1947 | 1935–1947 |
| Donald Grant | Labor | New South Wales | 1950 | 1944–1959 |
| John Hayes | United Australia/Liberal | Tasmania | 1947 | 1923–1947 |
| Herbert Hays | United Australia/Liberal | Tasmania | 1947 | 1923–1947 |
| Richard Keane | Labor | Victoria | 1950 | 1938–1946 |
| Charles Lamp | Labor | Tasmania | 1950 | 1938–1950 |
| William Large | Labor | New South Wales | 1947 | 1941–1951 |
| John Leckie | United Australia/Liberal | Victoria | 1947 | 1935–1947 |
| Allan MacDonald | United Australia/Liberal | Western Australia | 1947 | 1935–1947 |
| Ted Mattner | United Australia/Liberal | South Australia | 1946 | 1944–1946, 1950–1968 |
| Nick McKenna | Labor | Tasmania | 1950 | 1944–1968 |
| James McLachlan | United Australia/Liberal | South Australia | 1947 | 1935–1947 |
| George McLeay | United Australia/Liberal | South Australia | 1947 | 1935–1947, 1950–1955 |
| Richard Nash | Labor | Western Australia | 1950 | 1943–1951 |
| Theo Nicholls | Labor | South Australia | 1950 | 1944–1968 |
| Sid O'Flaherty | Labor | South Australia | 1950 | 1944–1962 |
| Burford Sampson | United Australia/Liberal | Tasmania | 1947 | 1925–1938, 1941–1947 |
| Jim Sheehan | Labor | Victoria | 1950 | 1938–1940, 1944–1962 |
| Dorothy Tangney | Labor | Western Australia | 1947 | 1943–1968 |
| Oliver Uppill | United Australia | South Australia | 1947 | 1935–1944 |
