= List of senators from Queensland =

Queensland Australian Senate
- Created: 1901
- Party: Labor (4); Liberal (2); National (2); Greens (2); One Nation (2)

This is a list of senators from the state of Queensland since the Federation of Australia in 1901.

== List ==
Senate	Election	Senator (Party)	Senator (Party)	Senator (Party)	Senator (Party)	Senator (Party)	Senator (Party)	Senator (Party)	Senator (Party)	Senator (Party)	Senator (Party)	Senator (Party)	Senator (Party)
1901–1903	1901	Anderson Dawson (Labor)	James Drake (Protectionist)	James Stewart (Labor)	John Ferguson (Free Trade)	Thomas Glassey (Protectionist)	William Higgs (Labor)	6 senators per state 1901-1950					
1904–1906	1903	Anderson Dawson (Labor)	James Drake (Protectionist)	James Stewart (Labor)	Harry Turley (Labor)	Thomas Givens (Labor/ National Labor Party/ Nationalist)	William Higgs (Labor)	6 senators per state 1901-1950					
1907–1910	1906	Anthony St Ledger (Anti-Socialist /Liberal)	Robert Sayers (Anti-Socialist /Liberal)	James Stewart (Labor)	Harry Turley (Labor)	Thomas Givens (Labor/ National Labor Party/ Nationalist)	Thomas Chataway (Anti-Socialist /Liberal)	6 senators per state 1901-1950					
1907–1910	1909	Anthony St Ledger (Anti-Socialist /Liberal)	Robert Sayers (Anti-Socialist /Liberal)	James Stewart (Labor)	Harry Turley (Labor)	Thomas Givens (Labor/ National Labor Party/ Nationalist)	Thomas Chataway (Anti-Socialist /Liberal)	6 senators per state 1901-1950					
1910–1913	1910	Anthony St Ledger (Anti-Socialist /Liberal)	Robert Sayers (Anti-Socialist /Liberal)	James Stewart (Labor)	Harry Turley (Labor)	Thomas Givens (Labor/ National Labor Party/ Nationalist)	Thomas Chataway (Anti-Socialist /Liberal)	6 senators per state 1901-1950					
1913–1914	1913	John Mullan (Labor)	Myles Ferricks (Labor)	James Stewart (Labor)	Harry Turley (Labor)	Thomas Givens (Labor/ National Labor Party/ Nationalist)	William Maughan (Labor)	6 senators per state 1901-1950					
1914–1917	1914	John Mullan (Labor)	Myles Ferricks (Labor)	James Stewart (Labor)	Harry Turley (Labor)	Thomas Givens (Labor/ National Labor Party/ Nationalist)	William Maughan (Labor)	6 senators per state 1901-1950					
1914–1917	1916	John Mullan (Labor)	Myles Ferricks (Labor)	James Stewart (Labor)	Harry Turley (Labor)	Thomas Givens (Labor/ National Labor Party/ Nationalist)	William Maughan (Labor)	6 senators per state 1901-1950					
1914–1917	1917	John Mullan (Labor)	Myles Ferricks (Labor)	James Stewart (Labor)	Harry Turley (Labor)	Thomas Givens (Labor/ National Labor Party/ Nationalist)	William Maughan (Labor)	6 senators per state 1901-1950					
1917–1920	1917	Harry Foll (Nationalist/ UAP/ Liberal)	Myles Ferricks (Labor)	Matthew Reid (Nationalist/ UAP)	Thomas Crawford (Nationalist/ UAP/ Independent)	Thomas Givens (Labor/ National Labor Party/ Nationalist)	William Maughan (Labor)	6 senators per state 1901-1950					
1920–1923	1919	Harry Foll (Nationalist/ UAP/ Liberal)	John Adamson (Nationalist)	Matthew Reid (Nationalist/ UAP)	Thomas Crawford (Nationalist/ UAP/ Independent)	Thomas Givens (Labor/ National Labor Party/ Nationalist)	William Glasgow (Nationalist/ UAP)	6 senators per state 1901-1950					
1920–1923	May 1922	Harry Foll (Nationalist/ UAP/ Liberal)	John MacDonald (Labor)	Matthew Reid (Nationalist/ UAP)	Thomas Crawford (Nationalist/ UAP/ Independent)	Thomas Givens (Labor/ National Labor Party/ Nationalist)	William Glasgow (Nationalist/ UAP)	6 senators per state 1901-1950					
1920–1923	Dec 1922	Harry Foll (Nationalist/ UAP/ Liberal)	William Thompson (Nationalist/ UAP)	Matthew Reid (Nationalist/ UAP)	Thomas Crawford (Nationalist/ UAP/ Independent)	Thomas Givens (Labor/ National Labor Party/ Nationalist)	William Glasgow (Nationalist/ UAP)	6 senators per state 1901-1950					
1923–1926	1922	Harry Foll (Nationalist/ UAP/ Liberal)	William Thompson (Nationalist/ UAP)	Matthew Reid (Nationalist/ UAP)	Thomas Crawford (Nationalist/ UAP/ Independent)	Thomas Givens (Labor/ National Labor Party/ Nationalist)	William Glasgow (Nationalist/ UAP)	6 senators per state 1901-1950					
1926–1929	1925	Harry Foll (Nationalist/ UAP/ Liberal)	William Thompson (Nationalist/ UAP)	Matthew Reid (Nationalist/ UAP)	Thomas Crawford (Nationalist/ UAP/ Independent)	Thomas Givens (Labor/ National Labor Party/ Nationalist)	William Glasgow (Nationalist/ UAP)	6 senators per state 1901-1950					
1926–1929	Aug 1928	Harry Foll (Nationalist/ UAP/ Liberal)	William Thompson (Nationalist/ UAP)	Matthew Reid (Nationalist/ UAP)	Thomas Crawford (Nationalist/ UAP/ Independent)	John MacDonald (Labor)	William Glasgow (Nationalist/ UAP)	6 senators per state 1901-1950					
1926–1929	Nov 1928	Harry Foll (Nationalist/ UAP/ Liberal)	William Thompson (Nationalist/ UAP)	Matthew Reid (Nationalist/ UAP)	Thomas Crawford (Nationalist/ UAP/ Independent)	Walter Cooper (Country)	William Glasgow (Nationalist/ UAP)	6 senators per state 1901-1950					
1929–1932	1928	Harry Foll (Nationalist/ UAP/ Liberal)	William Thompson (Nationalist/ UAP)	Matthew Reid (Nationalist/ UAP)	Thomas Crawford (Nationalist/ UAP/ Independent)	Walter Cooper (Country)	William Glasgow (Nationalist/ UAP)	6 senators per state 1901-1950					
1929–1932	1931	Harry Foll (Nationalist/ UAP/ Liberal)	William Thompson (Nationalist/ UAP)	Matthew Reid (Nationalist/ UAP)	Thomas Crawford (Nationalist/ UAP/ Independent)	Walter Cooper (Country)	William Glasgow (Nationalist/ UAP)	6 senators per state 1901-1950					
1932–1935	1931	Harry Foll (Nationalist/ UAP/ Liberal)	Gordon Brown (Labor)	Matthew Reid (Nationalist/ UAP)	Thomas Crawford (Nationalist/ UAP/ Independent)	Joe Collings (Labor)	John MacDonald (Labor)	6 senators per state 1901-1950					
1935–1938	1934	Harry Foll (Nationalist/ UAP/ Liberal)	Gordon Brown (Labor)	Walter Cooper (Country)	Thomas Crawford (Nationalist/ UAP/ Independent)	Joe Collings (Labor)	John MacDonald (Labor)	6 senators per state 1901-1950					
1935–1938	1937	Harry Foll (Nationalist/ UAP/ Liberal)	Gordon Brown (Labor)	Walter Cooper (Country)	Thomas Crawford (Nationalist/ UAP/ Independent)	Joe Collings (Labor)	Ben Courtice (Labor)	6 senators per state 1901-1950					
1938–1941	1937	Harry Foll (Nationalist/ UAP/ Liberal)	Gordon Brown (Labor)	Walter Cooper (Country)	Thomas Crawford (Nationalist/ UAP/ Independent)	Joe Collings (Labor)	Ben Courtice (Labor)	6 senators per state 1901-1950					
1941–1944	1940	Harry Foll (Nationalist/ UAP/ Liberal)	Gordon Brown (Labor)	Walter Cooper (Country)	Thomas Crawford (Nationalist/ UAP/ Independent)	Joe Collings (Labor)	Ben Courtice (Labor)	6 senators per state 1901-1950					
1944–1947	1943	Harry Foll (Nationalist/ UAP/ Liberal)	Gordon Brown (Labor)	Walter Cooper (Country)	Thomas Crawford (Nationalist/ UAP/ Independent)	Joe Collings (Labor)	Ben Courtice (Labor)	6 senators per state 1901-1950					
1944–1947	1944	Harry Foll (Nationalist/ UAP/ Liberal)	Gordon Brown (Labor)	Walter Cooper (Country)	Thomas Crawford (Nationalist/ UAP/ Independent)	Joe Collings (Labor)	Ben Courtice (Labor)	6 senators per state 1901-1950					
1944–1947	1945	Harry Foll (Nationalist/ UAP/ Liberal)	Gordon Brown (Labor)	Walter Cooper (Country)	Thomas Crawford (Nationalist/ UAP/ Independent)	Joe Collings (Labor)	Ben Courtice (Labor)	6 senators per state 1901-1950					
1947–1950	1946	Dame Annabelle Rankin (Liberal)	Gordon Brown (Labor)	Walter Cooper (Country)	Neil O'Sullivan (Liberal)	Joe Collings (Labor)	Ben Courtice (Labor)	6 senators per state 1901-1950					
1947–1950	1950	Dame Annabelle Rankin (Liberal)	Gordon Brown (Labor)	Walter Cooper (Country)	Neil O'Sullivan (Liberal)	Joe Collings (Labor)	Ben Courtice (Labor)	Ian Wood (Liberal)	Roy Kendall (Liberal)	Ted Maher (Country)	Wilfrid Simmonds (Country)	10 senators per state 1950-1984	
1950–1951	1949	Dame Annabelle Rankin (Liberal)	Gordon Brown (Labor)	Walter Cooper (Country)	Neil O'Sullivan (Liberal)	Archie Benn (Labor)	Ben Courtice (Labor)	Ian Wood (Liberal)	Roy Kendall (Liberal)	Ted Maher (Country)	Wilfrid Simmonds (Country)	10 senators per state 1950-1984	
1951–1953	1951	Dame Annabelle Rankin (Liberal)	Gordon Brown (Labor)	Walter Cooper (Country)	Neil O'Sullivan (Liberal)	Archie Benn (Labor)	Ben Courtice (Labor)	Ian Wood (Liberal)	Roy Kendall (Liberal)	Ted Maher (Country)	Condon Byrne (Labor)	10 senators per state 1950-1984	
1953–1956	1953	Dame Annabelle Rankin (Liberal)	Gordon Brown (Labor)	Walter Cooper (Country)	Neil O'Sullivan (Liberal)	Archie Benn (Labor)	Ben Courtice (Labor)	Ian Wood (Liberal)	Roy Kendall (Liberal)	Ted Maher (Country)	Condon Byrne (Labor)	10 senators per state 1950-1984	
1956–1959	1955	Dame Annabelle Rankin (Liberal)	Gordon Brown (Labor)	Walter Cooper (Country)	Neil O'Sullivan (Liberal)	Archie Benn (Labor)	Ben Courtice (Labor)	Ian Wood (Liberal)	Roy Kendall (Liberal)	Ted Maher (Country)	Condon Byrne (Labor)	10 senators per state 1950-1984	
1959–1962	1958	Dame Annabelle Rankin (Liberal)	Gordon Brown (Labor)	Walter Cooper (Country)	Neil O'Sullivan (Liberal)	Archie Benn (Labor)	Ben Courtice (Labor)	Ian Wood (Liberal)	Roy Kendall (Liberal)	Ted Maher (Country)	Felix Dittmer (Labor)	10 senators per state 1950-1984	
1962–1965	1961	Dame Annabelle Rankin (Liberal)	Gordon Brown (Labor)	Walter Cooper (Country)	Bob Sherrington (Liberal)	Archie Benn (Labor)	Max Poulter (Labor)	Ian Wood (Liberal)	Roy Kendall (Liberal)	Ted Maher (Country)	Felix Dittmer (Labor)	10 senators per state 1950-1984	
1962–1965	1962	Dame Annabelle Rankin (Liberal)	Gordon Brown (Labor)	Walter Cooper (Country)	Bob Sherrington (Liberal)	Archie Benn (Labor)	George Whiteside (Labor)	Ian Wood (Liberal)	Roy Kendall (Liberal)	Ted Maher (Country)	Felix Dittmer (Labor)	10 senators per state 1950-1984	
1962–1965	1963	Dame Annabelle Rankin (Liberal)	Gordon Brown (Labor)	Walter Cooper (Country)	Bob Sherrington (Liberal)	Archie Benn (Labor)	Kenneth Morris (Liberal)	Ian Wood (Liberal)	Roy Kendall (Liberal)	Ted Maher (Country)	Felix Dittmer (Labor)	10 senators per state 1950-1984	
1965–1968	1964	Dame Annabelle Rankin (Liberal)	Jim Keeffe (Labor)	Walter Cooper (Country)	Bob Sherrington (Liberal)	Archie Benn (Labor)	Kenneth Morris (Liberal)	Ian Wood (Liberal)	Ellis Lawrie (Country)	Vince Gair (DLP)	Felix Dittmer (Labor)	10 senators per state 1950-1984	
1965–1968	1966	Dame Annabelle Rankin (Liberal)	Jim Keeffe (Labor)	Walter Cooper (Country)	Bill Heatley (Liberal)	Archie Benn (Labor)	Kenneth Morris (Liberal)	Ian Wood (Liberal)	Ellis Lawrie (Country)	Vince Gair (DLP)	Felix Dittmer (Labor)	10 senators per state 1950-1984	
1968–1971	1967	Dame Annabelle Rankin (Liberal)	Jim Keeffe (Labor)	Ron Maunsell (Country)	Bert Milliner (Labor)	Condon Byrne (DLP)	George Georges (Labor/ Independent)	Ian Wood (Liberal)	Ellis Lawrie (Country)	Vince Gair (DLP)	Felix Dittmer (Labor)	10 senators per state 1950-1984	
1971–1974	1970	Dame Annabelle Rankin (Liberal)	Jim Keeffe (Labor)	Ron Maunsell (Country)	Bert Milliner (Labor)	Condon Byrne (DLP)	George Georges (Labor/ Independent)	Ian Wood (Liberal)	Ellis Lawrie (Country)	Vince Gair (DLP)	Ron McAuliffe (Labor)	10 senators per state 1950-1984	
1971–1974	1971	Neville Bonner (Liberal/ Independent)	Jim Keeffe (Labor)	Ron Maunsell (Country)	Bert Milliner (Labor)	Condon Byrne (DLP)	George Georges (Labor/ Independent)	Ian Wood (Liberal)	Ellis Lawrie (Country)	Vince Gair (DLP)	Ron McAuliffe (Labor)	10 senators per state 1950-1984	
1974–1975	1974	Neville Bonner (Liberal/ Independent)	Jim Keeffe (Labor)	Ron Maunsell (Country)	Bert Milliner (Labor)	Glen Sheil (NCP)	George Georges (Labor/ Independent)	Ian Wood (Liberal)	Ellis Lawrie (Country)	Kathy Sullivan (Liberal)	Ron McAuliffe (Labor)	10 senators per state 1950-1984	
1974–1975	1975	Neville Bonner (Liberal/ Independent)	Jim Keeffe (Labor)	Ron Maunsell (Country)	Albert Field (Independent)	Glen Sheil (NCP)	George Georges (Labor/ Independent)	Ian Wood (Liberal)	Ellis Lawrie (Country)	Kathy Sullivan (Liberal)	Ron McAuliffe (Labor)	10 senators per state 1950-1984	
1975–1978	1975	Neville Bonner (Liberal/ Independent)	Jim Keeffe (Labor)	Ron Maunsell (Country)	Mal Colston (Labor/ Independent)	Glen Sheil (NCP)	George Georges (Labor/ Independent)	Ian Wood (Liberal)	Stan Collard (NCP)	Kathy Sullivan (Liberal)	Ron McAuliffe (Labor)	10 senators per state 1950-1984	
1978–1981	1977	Neville Bonner (Liberal/ Independent)	Jim Keeffe (Labor)	Ron Maunsell (Country)	Mal Colston (Labor/ Independent)	Glen Sheil (NCP)	George Georges (Labor/ Independent)	David MacGibbon (Liberal)	Stan Collard (NCP)	Kathy Sullivan (Liberal)	Ron McAuliffe (Labor)	10 senators per state 1950-1984	
1978–1981	1981	Neville Bonner (Liberal/ Independent)	Jim Keeffe (Labor)	Ron Maunsell (Country)	Mal Colston (Labor/ Independent)	Florence Bjelke-Petersen (National)	George Georges (Labor/ Independent)	David MacGibbon (Liberal)	Stan Collard (NCP)	Kathy Sullivan (Liberal)	Ron McAuliffe (Labor)	10 senators per state 1950-1984	
1981–1983	1980	Neville Bonner (Liberal/ Independent)	Jim Keeffe (Labor)	Michael Macklin (Democrat)	Mal Colston (Labor/ Independent)	Florence Bjelke-Petersen (National)	George Georges (Labor/ Independent)	David MacGibbon (Liberal)	Stan Collard (NCP)	Kathy Sullivan (Liberal)	Gerry Jones (Labor)	10 senators per state 1950-1984	
1981–1983	1983	Neville Bonner (Liberal/ Independent)	Jim Keeffe (Labor)	Michael Macklin (Democrat)	Mal Colston (Labor/ Independent)	Florence Bjelke-Petersen (National)	George Georges (Labor/ Independent)	David MacGibbon (Liberal)	Stan Collard (NCP)	Kathy Sullivan (Liberal)	Gerry Jones (Labor)	10 senators per state 1950-1984	
1983–1985	1983	Ron Boswell (National	Margaret Reynolds (Labor)	Michael Macklin (Democrat)	Mal Colston (Labor/ Independent)	Florence Bjelke-Petersen (National)	George Georges (Labor/ Independent)	David MacGibbon (Liberal)	Stan Collard (NCP)	Kathy Sullivan (Liberal)	Gerry Jones (Labor)	10 senators per state 1950-1984	
1983–1985	1984	Ron Boswell (National	Margaret Reynolds (Labor)	Michael Macklin (Democrat)	Mal Colston (Labor/ Independent)	Florence Bjelke-Petersen (National)	George Georges (Labor/ Independent)	David MacGibbon (Liberal)	Stan Collard (NCP)	Warwick Parer (Liberal)	Gerry Jones (Labor)	John Black (Labor)	Glen Sheil (National)
1985–1987	1984	Ron Boswell (National	Margaret Reynolds (Labor)	Michael Macklin (Democrat)	Mal Colston (Labor/ Independent)	Florence Bjelke-Petersen (National)	George Georges (Labor/ Independent)	David MacGibbon (Liberal)	Stan Collard (NCP)	Warwick Parer (Liberal)	Gerry Jones (Labor)	John Black (Labor)	Glen Sheil (National)
1985–1987	1986	Ron Boswell (National	Margaret Reynolds (Labor)	Michael Macklin (Democrat)	Mal Colston (Labor/ Independent)	Florence Bjelke-Petersen (National)	George Georges (Labor/ Independent)	David MacGibbon (Liberal)	Stan Collard (NCP)	Warwick Parer (Liberal)	Gerry Jones (Labor)	John Black (Labor)	Glen Sheil (National)
1987–1990	1987	Ron Boswell (National	Margaret Reynolds (Labor)	Michael Macklin (Democrat)	Mal Colston (Labor/ Independent)	Florence Bjelke-Petersen (National)	Bryant Burns (Labor)	David MacGibbon (Liberal)	John Stone (National)	Warwick Parer (Liberal)	Gerry Jones (Labor)	John Black (Labor)	Glen Sheil (National)
1987–1990	1990	Ron Boswell (National	Margaret Reynolds (Labor)	Michael Macklin (Democrat)	Mal Colston (Labor/ Independent)	Florence Bjelke-Petersen (National)	Bryant Burns (Labor)	David MacGibbon (Liberal)	Bill O'Chee (National)	Warwick Parer (Liberal)	Gerry Jones (Labor)	John Black (Labor)	Glen Sheil (National)
1990–1993	1990	Ron Boswell (National	Margaret Reynolds (Labor)	Cheryl Kernot (Democrat)	Mal Colston (Labor/ Independent)	Florence Bjelke-Petersen (National)	Bryant Burns (Labor)	David MacGibbon (Liberal)	Bill O'Chee (National)	Warwick Parer (Liberal)	Gerry Jones (Labor)	Ian Macdonald (Liberal)	John Herron (Liberal)
1993–1996	1993	Ron Boswell (National	Margaret Reynolds (Labor)	Cheryl Kernot (Democrat)	Mal Colston (Labor/ Independent)	John Woodley (Democrat)	Bryant Burns (Labor)	David MacGibbon (Liberal)	Bill O'Chee (National)	Warwick Parer (Liberal)	Gerry Jones (Labor)	Ian Macdonald (Liberal)	John Herron (Liberal)
1996–1999	1996	Ron Boswell (National	Margaret Reynolds (Labor)	Cheryl Kernot (Democrat)	Mal Colston (Labor/ Independent)	John Woodley (Democrat)	Brenda Gibbs (Labor)	David MacGibbon (Liberal)	Bill O'Chee (National)	Warwick Parer (Liberal)	John Hogg (Labor)	Ian Macdonald (Liberal)	John Herron (Liberal)
1996–1999	1996	Ron Boswell (National	Margaret Reynolds (Labor)	Cheryl Kernot (Democrat)	Mal Colston (Labor/ Independent)	John Woodley (Democrat)	Brenda Gibbs (Labor)	David MacGibbon (Liberal)	Bill O'Chee (National)	Warwick Parer (Liberal)	John Hogg (Labor)	Ian Macdonald (Liberal)	John Herron (Liberal)
1996–1999	1997	Ron Boswell (National	Margaret Reynolds (Labor)	Andrew Bartlett (Democrat)	Mal Colston (Labor/ Independent)	John Woodley (Democrat)	Brenda Gibbs (Labor)	David MacGibbon (Liberal)	Bill O'Chee (National)	Warwick Parer (Liberal)	John Hogg (Labor)	Ian Macdonald (Liberal)	John Herron (Liberal)
1999–2002	1998	Ron Boswell (National	Joe Ludwig (Labor)	Andrew Bartlett (Democrat)	Brett Mason (Liberal)	John Woodley (Democrat)	Brenda Gibbs (Labor)	Jan McLucas (Labor)	Len Harris (One Nation)	Warwick Parer (Liberal)	John Hogg (Labor)	Ian Macdonald (Liberal)	John Herron (Liberal)
1999–2002	2000	Ron Boswell (National	Joe Ludwig (Labor)	Andrew Bartlett (Democrat)	Brett Mason (Liberal)	John Woodley (Democrat)	Brenda Gibbs (Labor)	Jan McLucas (Labor)	Len Harris (One Nation)	George Brandis (Liberal)	John Hogg (Labor)	Ian Macdonald (Liberal)	John Herron (Liberal)
1999–2002	2001	Ron Boswell (National	Joe Ludwig (Labor)	Andrew Bartlett (Democrat)	Brett Mason (Liberal)	John Cherry (Democrat)	Brenda Gibbs (Labor)	Jan McLucas (Labor)	Len Harris (One Nation)	George Brandis (Liberal)	John Hogg (Labor)	Ian Macdonald (Liberal)	John Herron (Liberal)
2002–2005	2001	Ron Boswell (National	Joe Ludwig (Labor)	Andrew Bartlett (Democrat)	Brett Mason (Liberal)	John Cherry (Democrat)	Claire Moore (Labor)	Jan McLucas (Labor)	Len Harris (One Nation)	George Brandis (Liberal)	John Hogg (Labor)	Ian Macdonald (Liberal)	John Herron (Liberal)
2002–2005	2002	Ron Boswell (National	Joe Ludwig (Labor)	Andrew Bartlett (Democrat)	Brett Mason (Liberal)	John Cherry (Democrat)	Claire Moore (Labor)	Jan McLucas (Labor)	Len Harris (One Nation)	George Brandis (Liberal)	John Hogg (Labor)	Ian Macdonald (Liberal)	Santo Santoro (Liberal)
2005–2008	2004	Ron Boswell (National	Joe Ludwig (Labor)	Andrew Bartlett (Democrat)	Brett Mason (Liberal)	Barnaby Joyce (National)	Claire Moore (Labor)	Jan McLucas (Labor)	Russell Trood (Liberal)	George Brandis (Liberal)	John Hogg (Labor)	Ian Macdonald (Liberal)	Santo Santoro (Liberal)
2005–2008	2007	Ron Boswell (National	Joe Ludwig (Labor)	Andrew Bartlett (Democrat)	Brett Mason (Liberal)	Barnaby Joyce (National)	Claire Moore (Labor)	Jan McLucas (Labor)	Russell Trood (Liberal)	George Brandis (Liberal)	John Hogg (Labor)	Ian Macdonald (Liberal)	Sue Boyce (Liberal)
2008–2011	2007	Ron Boswell (National	Joe Ludwig (Labor)	Mark Furner (Labor)	Brett Mason (Liberal)	Barnaby Joyce (National)	Claire Moore (Labor)	Jan McLucas (Labor)	Russell Trood (Liberal)	George Brandis (Liberal)	John Hogg (Labor)	Ian Macdonald (Liberal)	Sue Boyce (Liberal)
2008–2011	2008	Ron Boswell (National	Joe Ludwig (Labor)	Mark Furner (Labor)	Brett Mason (Liberal)	Barnaby Joyce (National)	Claire Moore (Labor)	Jan McLucas (Labor)	Russell Trood (Liberal)	George Brandis (Liberal)	John Hogg (Labor)	Ian Macdonald (Liberal)	Sue Boyce (Liberal)
2011–2014	2010	Ron Boswell (National	Joe Ludwig (Labor)	Mark Furner (Labor)	Brett Mason (Liberal)	Barnaby Joyce (National)	Claire Moore (Labor)	Jan McLucas (Labor)	Larissa Waters (Greens)	George Brandis (Liberal)	John Hogg (Labor)	Ian Macdonald (Liberal)	Sue Boyce (Liberal)
2011–2014	2014	Ron Boswell (National	Joe Ludwig (Labor)	Mark Furner (Labor)	Brett Mason (Liberal)	Barry O'Sullivan (National)	Claire Moore (Labor)	Jan McLucas (Labor)	Larissa Waters (Greens)	George Brandis (Liberal)	John Hogg (Labor)	Ian Macdonald (Liberal)	Sue Boyce (Liberal)
2014–2016	2013	Matt Canavan (National)	Joe Ludwig (Labor)	Glenn Lazarus (PUP/ Independent/ Lazarus Team)	Brett Mason (Liberal)	Barry O'Sullivan (National)	Claire Moore (Labor)	Jan McLucas (Labor)	Larissa Waters (Greens)	George Brandis (Liberal)	Chris Ketter (Labor)	Ian Macdonald (Liberal)	James McGrath (Liberal)
2014–2016	2015a	Matt Canavan (National)	Joe Ludwig (Labor)	Glenn Lazarus (PUP/ Independent/ Lazarus Team)	Joanna Lindgren (Liberal)	Barry O'Sullivan (National)	Claire Moore (Labor)	Jan McLucas (Labor)	Larissa Waters (Greens)	George Brandis (Liberal)	Chris Ketter (Labor)	Ian Macdonald (Liberal)	James McGrath (Liberal)
2014–2016	2015b	Matt Canavan (National)	Joe Ludwig (Labor)	Glenn Lazarus (PUP/ Independent/ Lazarus Team)	Joanna Lindgren (Liberal)	Barry O'Sullivan (National)	Claire Moore (Labor)	Jan McLucas (Labor)	Larissa Waters (Greens)	George Brandis (Liberal)	Chris Ketter (Labor)	Ian Macdonald (Liberal)	James McGrath (Liberal)
2016–2019	2016	Matt Canavan (National)	Anthony Chisholm (Labor)	Pauline Hanson (One Nation)	Malcolm Roberts (One Nation)	Barry O'Sullivan (National)	Claire Moore (Labor)	Murray Watt (Labor)	Larissa Waters (Greens)	George Brandis (Liberal)	Chris Ketter (Labor)	Ian Macdonald (Liberal)	James McGrath (Liberal)
2016–2019	2017	Matt Canavan (National)	Anthony Chisholm (Labor)	Pauline Hanson (One Nation)	Fraser Anning (Independent/ Katter's/ Independent/ Anning's)	Barry O'Sullivan (National)	Claire Moore (Labor)	Murray Watt (Labor)	Andrew Bartlett (Green)	George Brandis (Liberal)	Chris Ketter (Labor)	Ian Macdonald (Liberal)	James McGrath (Liberal)
2016–2019	2018a	Matt Canavan (National)	Anthony Chisholm (Labor)	Pauline Hanson (One Nation)	Fraser Anning (Independent/ Katter's/ Independent/ Anning's)	Barry O'Sullivan (National)	Claire Moore (Labor)	Murray Watt (Labor)	Andrew Bartlett (Green)	Amanda Stoker (Liberal)	Chris Ketter (Labor)	Ian Macdonald (Liberal)	James McGrath (Liberal)
2016–2019	2018b	Matt Canavan (National)	Anthony Chisholm (Labor)	Pauline Hanson (One Nation)	Fraser Anning (Independent/ Katter's/ Independent/ Anning's)	Barry O'Sullivan (National)	Claire Moore (Labor)	Murray Watt (Labor)	Larissa Waters (Greens)	Amanda Stoker (Liberal)	Chris Ketter (Labor)	Ian Macdonald (Liberal)	James McGrath (Liberal)
2016–2019	2019	Matt Canavan (National)	Anthony Chisholm (Labor)	Pauline Hanson (One Nation)	Fraser Anning (Independent/ Katter's/ Independent/ Anning's)	Barry O'Sullivan (National)	Claire Moore (Labor)	Murray Watt (Labor)	Larissa Waters (Greens)	Amanda Stoker (Liberal)	Chris Ketter (Labor)	Ian Macdonald (Liberal)	James McGrath (Liberal)
2019–2022	2019	Matt Canavan (National)	Anthony Chisholm (Labor)	Pauline Hanson (One Nation)	Malcolm Roberts (One Nation)	Susan McDonald (National)	Nita Green (Labor)	Murray Watt (Labor)	Larissa Waters (Greens)	Amanda Stoker (Liberal)	Gerard Rennick (Liberal/ Independent/ People First)	Paul Scarr (Liberal)	James McGrath (Liberal)
2022–2025	2022	Matt Canavan (National)	Anthony Chisholm (Labor)	Pauline Hanson (One Nation)	Malcolm Roberts (One Nation)	Susan McDonald (National)	Nita Green (Labor)	Murray Watt (Labor)	Larissa Waters (Greens)	Penny Allman-Payne (Greens)	Gerard Rennick (Liberal/ Independent/ People First)	Paul Scarr (Liberal)	James McGrath (Liberal)
2022–2025	2024a	Matt Canavan (National)	Anthony Chisholm (Labor)	Pauline Hanson (One Nation)	Malcolm Roberts (One Nation)	Susan McDonald (National)	Nita Green (Labor)	Murray Watt (Labor)	Larissa Waters (Greens)	Penny Allman-Payne (Greens)	Gerard Rennick (Liberal/ Independent/ People First)	Paul Scarr (Liberal)	James McGrath (Liberal)
2022–2025	2024b	Matt Canavan (National)	Anthony Chisholm (Labor)	Pauline Hanson (One Nation)	Malcolm Roberts (One Nation)	Susan McDonald (National)	Nita Green (Labor)	Murray Watt (Labor)	Larissa Waters (Greens)	Penny Allman-Payne (Greens)	Gerard Rennick (Liberal/ Independent/ People First)	Paul Scarr (Liberal)	James McGrath (Liberal)
2025–2028	2025	Matt Canavan (National)	Anthony Chisholm (Labor)	Pauline Hanson (One Nation)	Malcolm Roberts (One Nation)	Susan McDonald (National)	Nita Green (Labor)	Murray Watt (Labor)	Larissa Waters (Greens)	Penny Allman-Payne (Greens)	Corinne Mulholland (Labor)	Paul Scarr (Liberal)	James McGrath (Liberal)

== See also ==
- Electoral results for the Australian Senate in Queensland
