= Fred Beerworth =

Australian politician

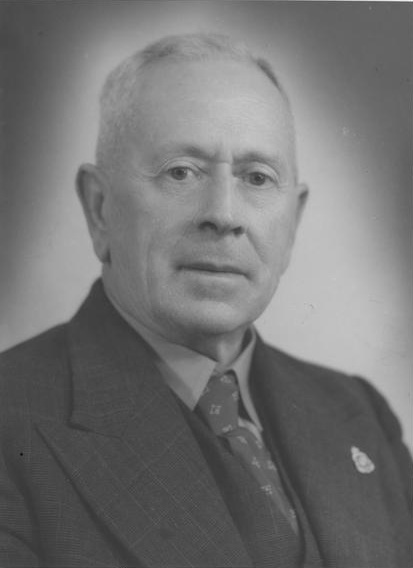

Senator for South Australia
- In office 28 September 1946 – 19 March 1951
- Preceded by: Ted Mattner

Personal details
- Born: 6 May 1886 Quorn, South Australia
- Died: 17 May 1968 (aged 82) Adelaide, South Australia
- Party: Labor
- Spouses: Ellen Beatrice Bourke (m. 1917–1920) Nora Devitt Kenny (m. 1925)
- Relations: James Beerworth (brother)
- Occupation: Railwayman

Frederick Hubert Beerworth (17 May 1886 – 17 May 1968) was an Australian trade unionist and politician. He was a member of the Australian Labor Party (ALP) and served as a Senator for South Australia from 1946 to 1951. He was a railwayman prior to entering politics and served as state president of the Australian Federated Union of Locomotive Enginemen from 1940 to 1941.

== Early life ==
Beerworth was born on 17 May 1886 in Quorn, South Australia. He was one of eleven children born to Mary (née McInerney) and William Carl Beerworth, a German immigrant whose surname was originally "Bierwirth". His older brother James Beerworth was a member of the South Australian parliament in the 1930s and 1940s.

Beerworth attended state schools in Pametta and Carrieton. After leaving school he worked as a farm labourer for a period.

== Railways career ==
Beerworth joined South Australian Railways in 1911. He was employed as an engine-cleaner at Quorn and Peterborough, later becoming a railmotor driver at Gladstone, Port Lincoln and Mile End. His service with South Australian Railways spanned over 30 years. Beerworth was involved in an accident in 1938 when the railcar he was driving struck and fatally injured a 78-year-old pedestrian near Blackwood railway station. An inquest found that the pedestrian had misjudged the crossing and no fault was attributable to the driver.

Beerworth joined the Australian Federated Union of Locomotive Enginemen in 1921. He was elected to its state executive in 1937 and served as vice-president in 1939 and president from 1940 to 1941.

== Military service ==
Beerworth enlisted in the Australian Imperial Force in 1916 with the rank of second corporal. He was sent to the Western Front in 1917 where he served with the 4th Australian Broad Gauge Railway Operating Company in England and France. He was hospitalised twice during his enlistment and was discharged in September 1919.

== Politics ==
Beerworth joined the Australian Labor Party at a young age and served as secretary of its Hilton and Cowandilla branches. He was an unsuccessful candidate for ALP preselection prior to the 1938 South Australian state election. He was later elected to the West Torrens Council in 1944.

Beerworth was elected to the Senate at the 1946 federal election, winning a six-year term beginning on 1 July 1947. As the lead ALP candidate in South Australia, he took his seat immediately to fill the casual vacancy caused by the resignation of Oliver Uppill, which had been filled by Ted Mattner in the interim.

Beerworth made only three brief speeches in the Senate, advocating for the standardisation of rail gauge in Australia. He also asked a number of parliamentary questions on railway matters and a wide range of other subjects. In November 1950 he failed to win re-endorsement from the ALP for a further term in the Senate. His term in the Senate was cut short by a double dissolution on 19 March 1951 prior to the 1951 federal election.

== Personal life ==
In 1917, Beerworth married Ellen Bourke. He was widowed in 1920 and remarried in 1925 to Nora Kenny, with whom he had one son. He died on 17 May 1968, his 82nd birthday.
