= Oliver Uppill =

Australian politician (1876–1946)

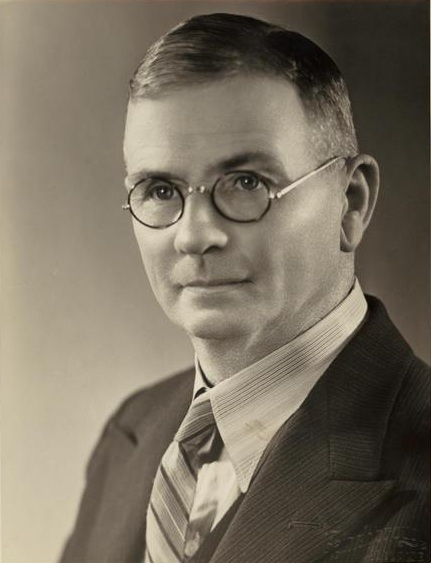

Senator for South Australia
- In office 1 July 1935 – 16 September 1944
- Succeeded by: Ted Mattner

Personal details
- Born: 9 May 1876 Nantawarra, South Australia
- Died: 28 February 1946 (aged 69) Joslin, South Australia
- Party: UAP

Oliver Uppill (9 May 1876 – 28 February 1946) was an Australian politician. He was a United Australia Party member of the Australian Senate from 1934 to 1944, representing South Australia.

Uppill was born into a farming family at Nantawarra, South Australia and was educated at Balaklava Public School and then privately. He became a farmer and grazier at nearby Balaklava from c. 1906. Having long been involved in the state's main conservative party, the Liberal Union, he was elected party president in 1920, and headed the party through its merger with the National Party to form the Liberal Federation, serving as president of the merged body until 1924. He later served on the board of the State Bank of South Australia from 1929, after advocacy from farmers for a board member to represent their interests. Uppill also served as secretary of the Balaklava branch of the Agricultural Bureau and president and secretary of the Balaklava and Dalkey Agricultural Society, and was the inaugural chairman of the Balaklava branch of the Liberal and Country League in 1932.

Uppill was elected to the Senate for the United Australia Party at the 1934 federal election. He was opposition whip from 1943 to 1944. He resigned his seat due to ill health in 1944, necessitating the appointment of Ted Mattner to succeed him. He was largely interested in agricultural issues, in particular wheat farming, and upon his resignation his party's Senate leader, George McLeay, said of Uppill's Senate service that his "knowledge of the practical problems of the man on the land has been of considerable value in the improvement of agricultural legislation.

He died at an St Anthony's Private Hospital in the Adelaide suburb of Joslin in 1946 after a long illness and was buried at North Road Cemetery.

He married Gertrude Caroline Murray in 1904. They had two children.
