= Thomas Crawford (Australian politician) =

Australian politician

The Honourable Thomas Crawford
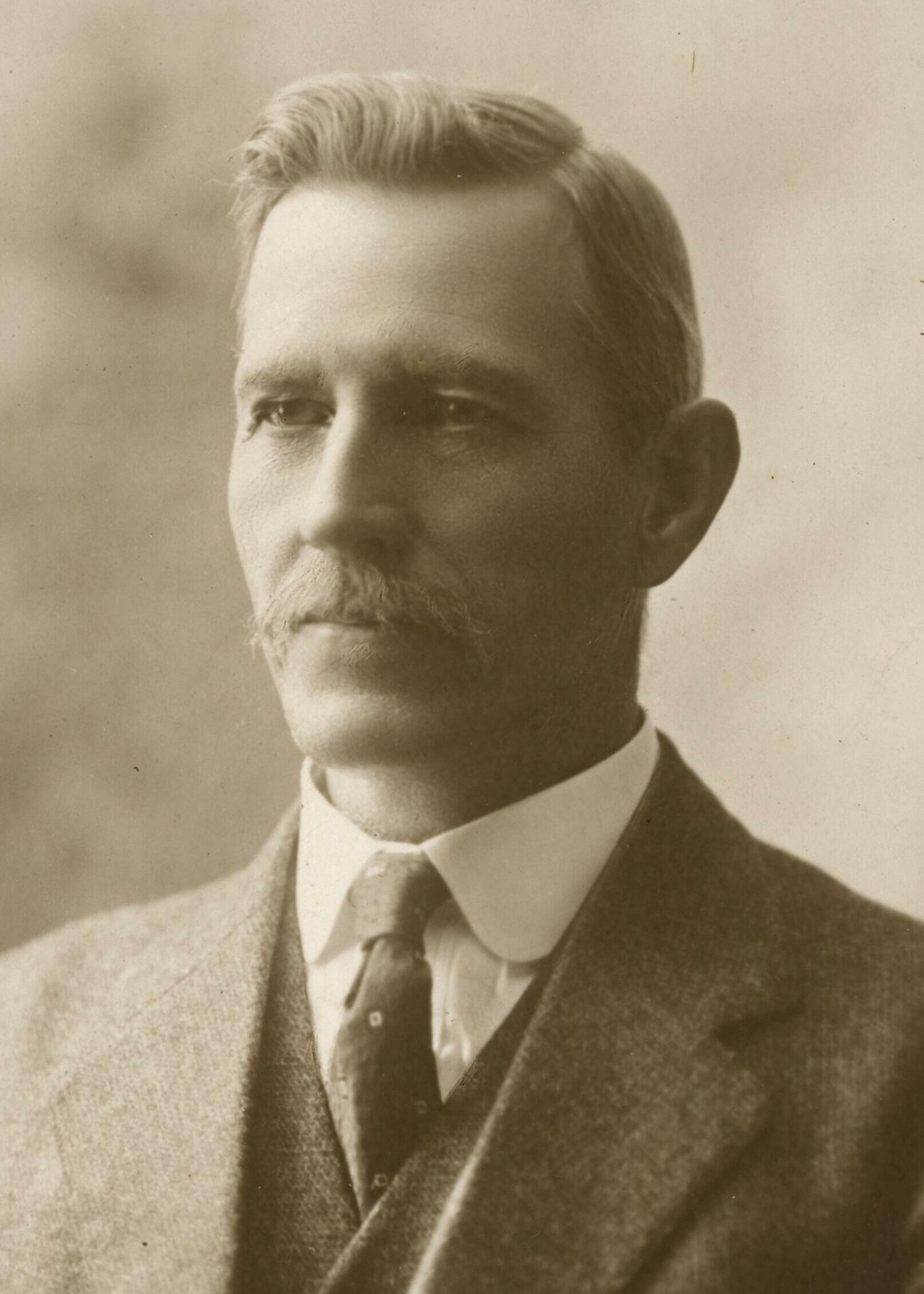

Senator for Queensland
- In office 1 July 1917 – 30 June 1947

Personal details
- Born: 31 January 1865 Collingwood, Victoria
- Died: 8 June 1948 (aged 83) Indooroopilly, Queensland
- Party: Nationalist (1917–31); UAP (1931–44); Independent (1944–47)
- Spouse: Emily
- Occupation: Sugar cane farmer

Thomas William Crawford (31 January 1865 – 8 June 1948) was a long-serving member of the Australian Senate and joint Father of the Senate.

== Early life ==
Crawford was born on 31 January 1865 in East Collingwood, Victoria. He was the oldest of seven children born to Helen (née Lawson) and Thomas Crawford. His mother was born in England, while his father was born in County Armagh, Ireland, and moved to Australia during the Victorian gold rush.

Crawford's father ran a store at Woods Point on the Gippsland goldfields, and later took up land on the Gippsland Lakes. He received limited schooling and worked on the family farm from a young age. In 1879, his father "mysteriously disappeared". Crawford subsequently secured a printing apprenticeship with the Gippsland Mercury in Sale. He moved to Melbourne to work on The Australasian, then after two years moved north to Brisbane and joined the Brisbane Courier. He joined the Queensland Typographical Association (QTA), which by the late 1880s was one of the strongest printers' union in Australia. He became secretary of the QTA in 1887 and grew its membership by touring the colony.

Crawford served on the 1891 royal commission into working conditions, as a representative of the labour movement. He was elected president of the QTA in February 1892, holding office until July 1893 and also serving as a delegate to the Australian Labour Federation. His union was hit hard by the 1890s depression.

== Sugar grower ==
In 1895 Crawford moved to the country, purchasing land near Mossman, Queensland and becoming a successful sugar cane grower. He became Chairman of the Mossman Sugar Mill and heavily involved in sugar issues, including the use of Melanesian labourers on sugar plantations. His stature within the sugar growing community was such that he was elected President of the powerful Queensland Sugar Producers Association in 1909 (a position he held until 1943) and as a member of the Douglas Shire Council.

== Political career ==
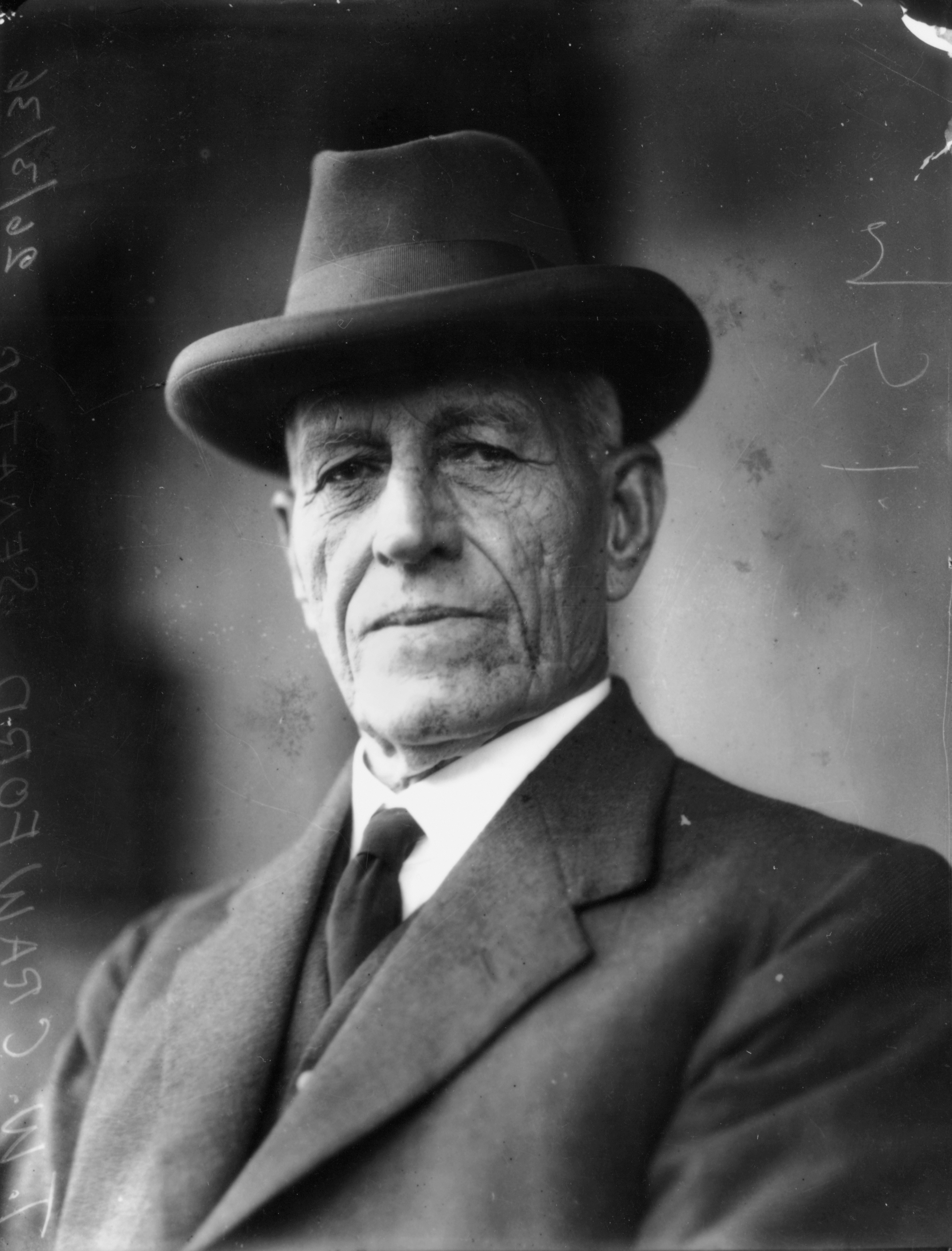
Crawford in 1936

Crawford unsuccessfully stood for parliament firstly in 1910 as a Commonwealth Liberal Party candidate for the Division of Herbert and then as a Senate candidate at the 1914 election before his election to the Senate in 1917 as a representative of the Nationalist Party of Australia.

Crawford retained his seat at subsequent elections until his retirement in June 1947. From 1931, he was a member of the United Australia Party. From 1 July 1938 until their retirements on 30 June 1947, he and Harry Foll were the joint Fathers of the Senate. In 1944 he was asked to leave the Opposition party room and served the remainder of his term as an independent.

In May 1941, Crawford announced that he would leave the UAP and sit as an independent, in protest at the composition of the Third Menzies ministry – specifically the failure of prime minister Robert Menzies to include MPs who had voted for his opponent Billy Hughes in the UAP leadership ballot.

Respected for his authority on sugar issues, an important industry in Australia at the time, Crawford served as honorary minister and acting minister for trade and customs in the Stanley Bruce government. He was also at times a strong advocate for statehood for the Australian tropics.

== Legacy ==
Crawford died at Indooroopilly, survived by his wife Emily, four daughters and three sons. His funeral was held at the Albert Street Methodist Church and proceeded to the Mount Thompson crematorium. His son William Crawford was awarded the Military Medal for bravery in the field.
