= Archie Benn =

Australian politician

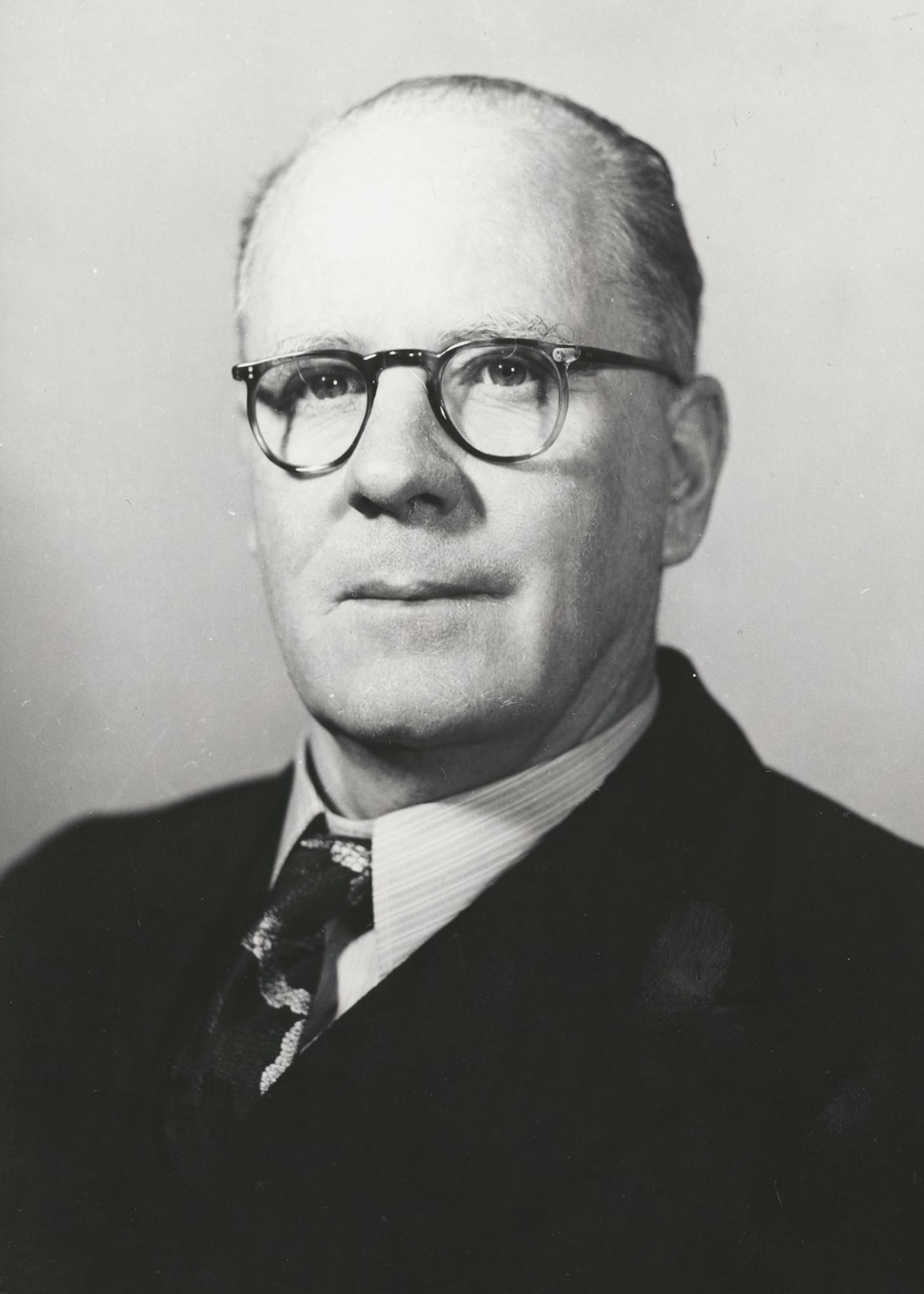

Senator for Queensland
- In office 1 July 1950 – 30 June 1968

Personal details
- Born: 20 January 1897 Branxholme, Victoria, Australia
- Died: 3 April 1980 (aged 83) Paddington, Queensland, Australia
- Party: Labor
- Spouse(s): Margaret Willey (m. 1924; died 1929) Frances Pegus (m. 1934)
- Occupation: Public servant

Archibald Malcolm Benn (20 January 1897 – 3 April 1980) was an Australian politician. He was a member of the Australian Labor Party (ALP) and served as a Senator for Queensland from 1950 to 1968. Prior to entering parliament he was a senior public servant in Queensland.

== Early life ==
Benn was born on 20 January 1897 in Branxholme, Victoria. He was the sixth of nine surviving children born to Mary (née McNeill) and Thomas Benn. His father was an Irish immigrant.

Benn left Victoria at a young age to join his older brother in Queensland. He lived in Toowoomba for a period and was involved with the Toowoomba Rugby League as a player and official. He also worked as a shearer in Charleville. Benn was appointed as a paid organiser for the Australian Workers' Union (AWU) in 1921, covering South West Queensland. He joined the Queensland Public Service in 1924 as a shop and factory inspector in the Public Works Department.

Benn's public service career was aided by his ties with AWU organiser Joe Bukowski and ALP state leader William Forgan Smith. In the early 1930s he spent periods in Innisfail and Mount Isa at the request of the Queensland cabinet, following industrial unrest. Benn was promoted to deputy chief inspector in 1940. He subsequently acted for periods as director of labour, chief inspector of workers' accommodation, registrar of trade unions, assistant deputy director general of manpower, and chief inspector of factories and shops.

== Politics ==
At the 1949 federal election, Benn was elected to a six-year Senate term commencing on 1 July 1950. As he had resigned from the Queensland public service for constitutional reasons, he worked in a department store until he was able to take up his seat. Benn's first term was cut short by a double dissolution, but he was re-elected at the 1951, 1955 and 1961 elections. He did not contest the 1967 election and retired at the expiry of his term on 30 June 1968.

Benn was active on several Senate committees, including as a member of the Joint Statutory Committee on Public Accounts from 1956 to 1963. His entire parliamentary career was spent in opposition and he briefly acted as leader of the opposition in the Senate in 1957 during Nick McKenna's illness. In 1964, Benn mounted an unsuccessful leadership spill against McKenna, against the wishes of party leader Arthur Calwell. His challenge was in response to McKenna and Calwell's decision to boycott a Senate debate on foreign affairs.

Benn spoke on a wide range of topics in the Senate, with a particular focus on economics and foreign affairs, and was associated with Labor's left-wing faction. He was a member of four parliamentary delegations overseas and was interested in the development of the Territory of Papua and New Guinea; his speech to the Inter-Parliamentary Union in 1962 was on that subject. In 1960, Benn planted tobacco bush seeds around Parliament House as a publicity stunt to draw attention to their status as an invasive weed in Queensland. He also attracted attention for his comments likening post-war immigration to Queensland's cane toad plague, in 1951 calling for immigration to be suspended for a period of 12 months to help with unemployment.

Benn was involved in a number of personal conflicts. He refused to acknowledge Democratic Labor Party senator Vince Gair, who had been his superior minister during his time in the Queensland public service but left the ALP during the mid-1950s split. On two other occasions Benn was the subject of controversy for accusing political opponents of drunkenness. In 1958, he made an interjection in the Senate implying that ACTU president Albert Monk had been intoxicated during a television appearance. He subsequently retracted his comments, although he described them as "flippant" and stated they had been taken out of context. In 1968, the month before his term ended, Benn used question time to suggest that Liberal senator Magnus Cormack should be subject to daily breathalyser tests. He refused to withdraw his question and was suspended for 24 hours with unanimous approval.

== Personal life ==
In 1924, Benn married Margaret Willey, with whom he had one son. He was widowed in 1929 and remarried in 1934 to Frances Pegus, with whom he had a son and a daughter. He died on 3 April 1980 in Paddington, Queensland.
