= Joe Cooke (politician) =

Australian politician

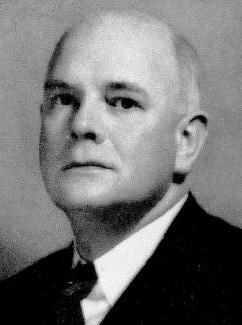

Senator for Western Australia
- In office 1 July 1947 – 19 March 1951
- In office 7 February 1952 – 30 June 1965
- Preceded by: Richard Nash

Personal details
- Born: 28 March 1904 Perth, Western Australia, Australia
- Died: 14 April 1981 (aged 77)
- Party: Australian Labor Party
- Spouse: Monica Mullany (m. 1930)
- Relations: John Mullany (father-in-law)
- Occupation: Railway officer

Joseph Alfred Cooke (28 March 1904 – 14 April 1981) was an Australian politician. Born in Western Australia, he was educated at state schools before becoming a railways officer, rising to become President of the Railway Officers' Union. In 1946, he was elected to the Australian Senate as a Labor Senator for Western Australia. Defeated in 1951, he was re-appointed in 1952 after the death of Labor Senator Richard Nash. He held the seat until his defeat in 1964, when he was demoted to third place on the ballot paper to make way for Western Australian Labor Party Vice-president John Wheeldon. Cooke died in 1981.

== Early life ==
Cooke was born in Perth on 28 March 1904. He was the son of Elizabeth Anne (née Doonan) and Charles John Cooke (originally Cook). His father was a hotel proprietor, while his mother came from a "well-to-do family of grocers and drapers in Fremantle".

Cooke spent his early years in Jarrahdale, moving to Greenbushes with his family in 1914. They later returned to Perth where he completed his education at the Thomas Street State School in Subiaco. He was a talented sportsman and rowed for Western Australia at the King's Cup in 1924.

== Career ==
In 1921, Cooke joined Western Australian Government Railways and Tramways as a clerk in the audit and accounts branch. He was an officeholder in the Railway Officers' Union and served as general president of the union from 1938 to 1947. He also served on the Metropolitan Market Trust from 1944 to 1946 and was appointed by the state government to a committee inquirying into the marketing and production of fruit and vegetables.

== Politics ==
Cooke joined the Australian Labor Party soon after leaving school. He held a number of committee posts in the state branch before being elected state president, serving from 1943 to 1947. He was a delegate to the ALP federal conference from 1945 to 1947.

=== Senate ===
At the 1946 federal election, Cooke was elected to a six-year term in the Senate beginning on 1 July 1947. His first term was cut short by a double dissolution and he failed to retain his seat at the 1951 election, however in February 1952 he was instead appointed to fill a casual vacancy caused by the death of his ALP colleague Richard Nash. Cooke was re-elected at the head of the ALP ticket at the 1953 and 1958 elections, but was defeated in 1964 after being demoted to the unwinnable third position on the ticket at the behest of ALP state secretary Joe Chamberlain.

== Personal life ==
In 1930, Cooke married Monica Mullany, the daughter of state MP John Mullany. The couple had five children, living for periods in Maylands and Leederville before settling in the old lighthouse's cottage in North Beach in 1952. He died on 14 April 1981, aged 77.
