= Charles Lamp =

Australian politician

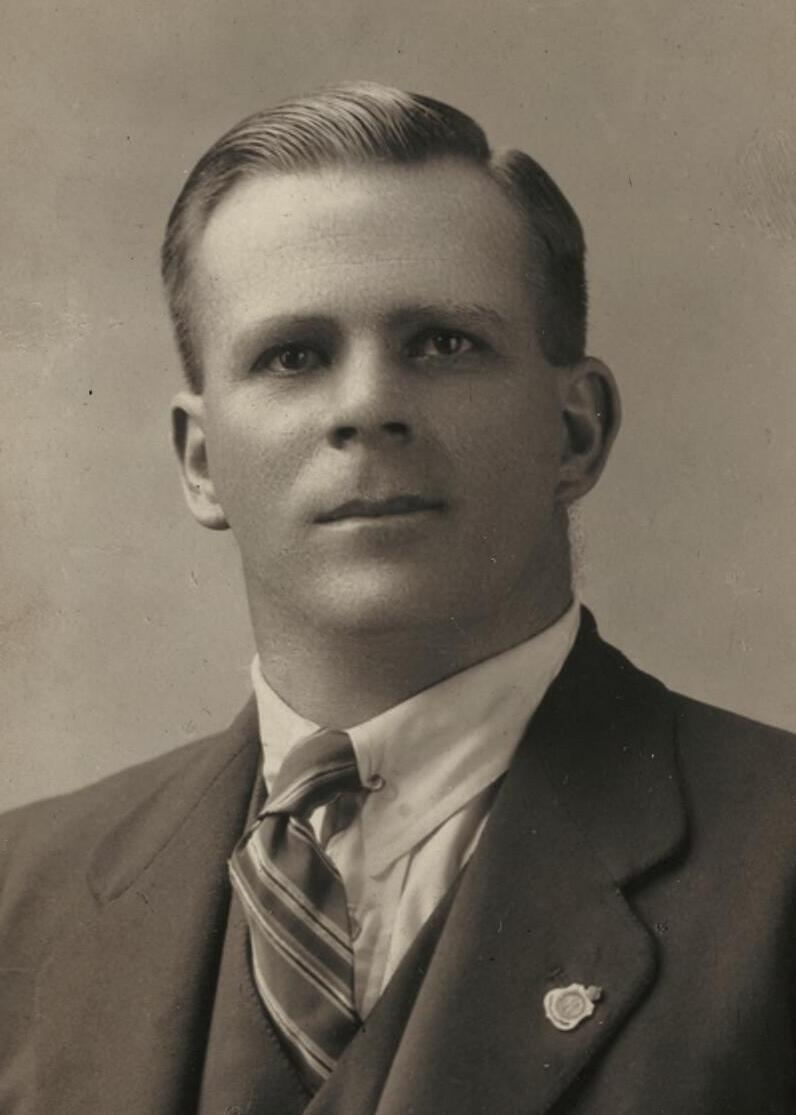
- Lamp in 1938

Senator for Tasmania
- In office 1 July 1938 – 30 June 1950

Personal details
- Born: 3 September 1895 Hobart, Tasmania, Australia
- Died: 17 April 1972 (aged 76) Launceston, Tasmania, Australia
- Party: Labor
- Spouse(s): Mary Ahearn (m. 1921; died 1966) May McDonald (m. 1968)
- Occupation: Soldier; Railwayman

Charles Adcock Lamp (3 September 1895 – 17 April 1972) was an Australian politician and trade unionist. He was a Senator for Tasmania from 1938 to 1950, representing the Australian Labor Party (ALP). He also served terms as the party's state secretary and state president in Tasmania and was state president of the Australian Railways Union.

== Early life ==
Lamp was born on 3 September 1895 in Hobart, Tasmania. He was the son of Rosina (née Fewkes) and John Frederick August Lamp. His paternal grandfather was a German seaman who jumped ship in South Australia and later made his way to Tasmania.

Lamp attended a state school in Queenstown on Tasmania's West Coast. He initially trained as a cabinetmaker after leaving school, later taking up an apprenticeship with Gurr and Sons, a Launceston shipbuilding firm. He reportedly joined the Amalgamated Miners' Union in 1908 at the age of twelve. He enlisted in the Australian Imperial Force (AIF) in January 1916, joining the 9th Field Company of the Australian Engineers. He saw active service in France, but was repatriated to England after being wounded in June 1918 and returned to Australia the following year. He was left with a chronic throat complaint following a gassing attack.

After his military service, Lamp joined the Tasmanian Government Railways. He was an officeholder in the Australian Railways Union (ARU), initially as secretary of its locomotive section and later as state president; he also served a term as president of the Launceston Trades Hall Council. Lamp established the influential ARU Gazette in 1928. He was secretary of the Launceston branch of the Workers' Educational Association and according to Jim Brigden showed "unusual zeal, energy and persistence in the face of most discouraging apathy".

== Politics ==
=== Early involvement ===
Lamp joined the Australian Labor Party at a young age. He additionally joined the Launceston branch of the Douglas Social Credit Association (DSCA) in 1931, at a time when social credit ideas were prevalent in Tasmanian labour circles. He was elected to the ALP state and federal executives in 1928 and was state secretary of the party from 1936 to 1940. The party's state president Thomas D'Alton described him as the "best secretary the state movement had ever known".

Lamp was an unsuccessful candidate in the seat of Bass at the 1934 Tasmanian state election. He was one of three ALP candidates officially endorsed by the DSCA, along with Edward Brooker and Joseph McGrath, with George McElwee describing him as "a 100 per cent Douglasite".

=== Senate ===
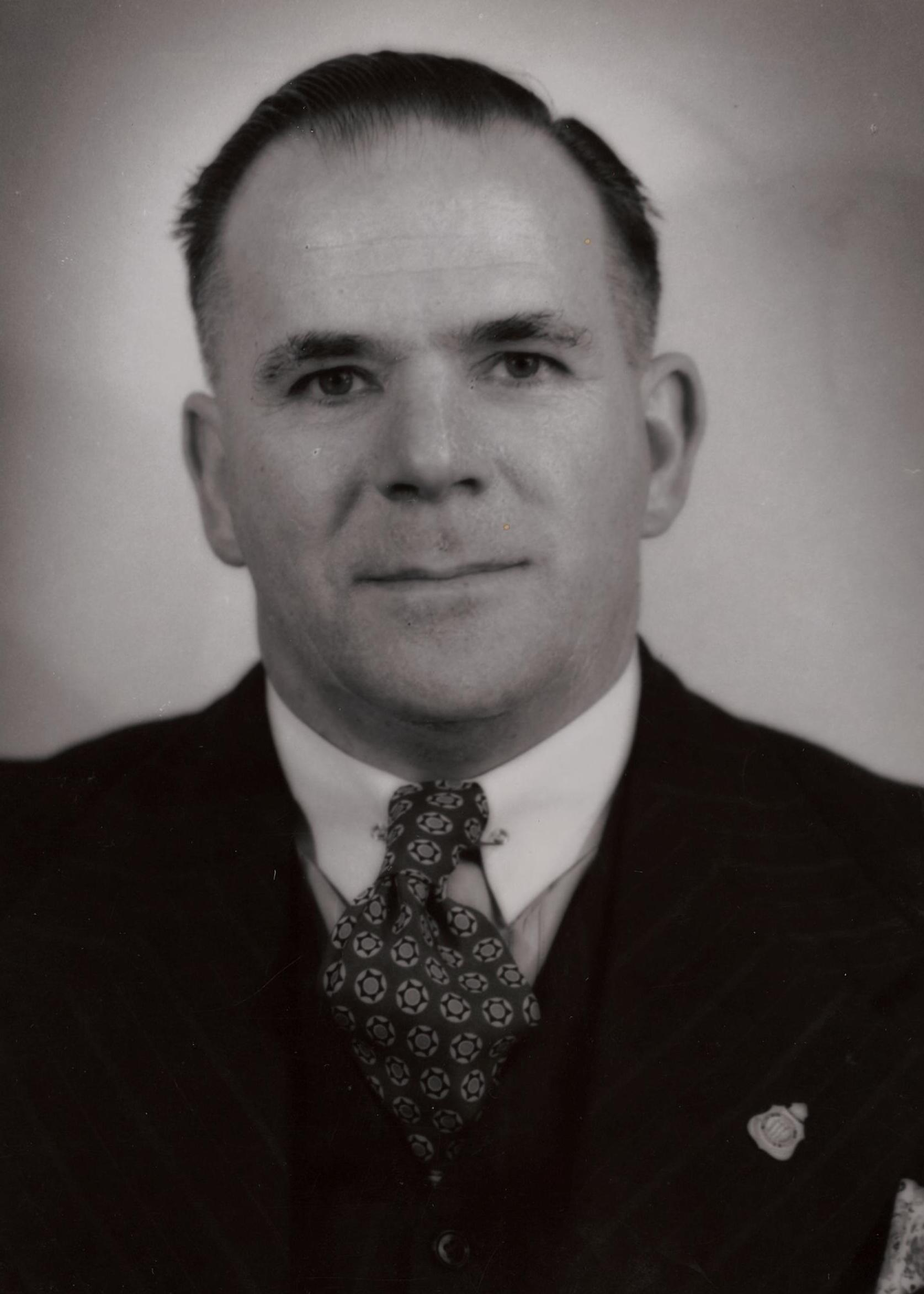
Lamp in the 1940s

At the 1937 federal election, Lamp was elected to a six-year Senate term beginning on 1 July 1938. He won a further six-year term at the 1943 election.

In the Senate, Lamp spoke frequently on Tasmanian matters but was also interested in defence issues and monetary policy, putting forward social credit views. He strongly supported the Chifley government's banking nationalisation legislation. In 1946 he was selected to represent the government at the International Labour Conference in the United States.

Lamp lost his Senate seat at the 1949 election, which saw the defeat of the Chifley government. Following the election he stated that the government had not done enough for old-age pensioners and returned soldiers.

== Personal life ==
In 1921, Lamp married Mary Evangelist Ahearn, with whom he had three children. His son John was killed in World War II. He was widowed in 1966 and remarried in 1968 to May McDonald, whose father James McDonald had been a Tasmanian state MP.

Lamp died in Launceston on 17 April 1972, aged 76.
