= List of longest-serving members of the Parliament of Australia =

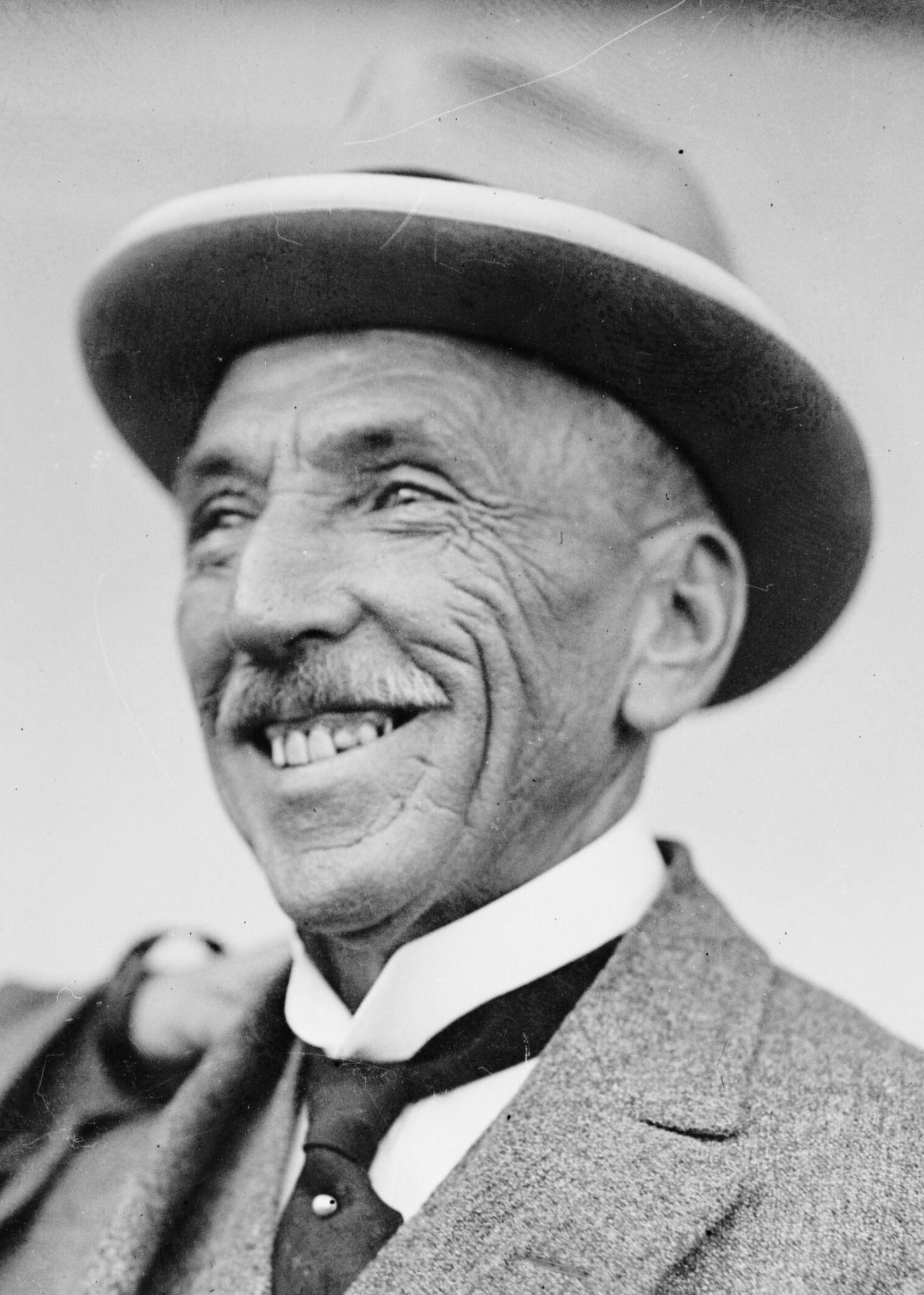
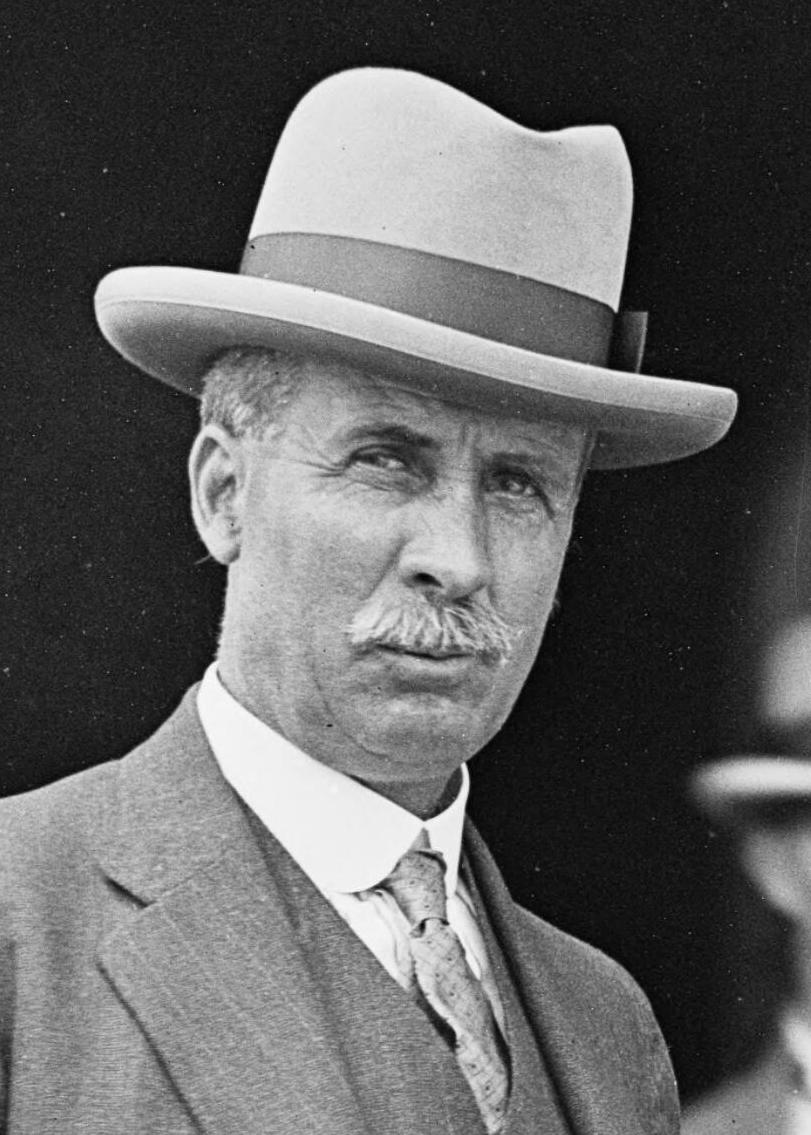
Billy Hughes (left) and George Pearce (right), the longest-serving members of the House of Representatives and Senate, respectively.

This article lists the longest-serving members of the Parliament of Australia.

== Longest total service ==
This section lists members of parliament who have served for a cumulative total of at least 30 years.

All these periods of service were spent in one House exclusively. A number of people have served in both the Senate and the House of Representatives, but none of them to date has had an aggregate length of service to the Parliament reaching 30 years.

No woman yet appears on this list.

Name	Party	Chamber(s)	Start of service	End of service	Period of service
Billy Hughes	Labor/NLP/Nationalist/Independent/ Australian/UAP/Liberal	House of Reps	29 March 1901	28 October 1952†	51 years, 213 days
Philip Ruddock	Liberal	House of Reps	22 September 1973	9 May 2016	42 years, 229 days
Sir Earle Page	Country	House of Reps	13 December 1919	9 December 1961	41 years, 362 days
Sir George Pearce	Labor/Nationalist/UAP	Senate	29 March 1901	30 June 1938	37 years, 94 days
Sir Walter Cooper	Country	Senate	17 November 1928	30 June 1932	36 years, 227 days
Sir Walter Cooper	Country	Senate	1 July 1935	30 June 1968	36 years, 227 days
William Maloney	Labor	House of Reps	30 March 1904	27 August 1940†	36 years, 151 days
Sir John McEwen	Country	House of Reps	15 September 1934	1 February 1971	36 years, 139 days
Norman Makin	Labor	House of Reps	13 December 1919	14 August 1946	36 years, 37 days
Norman Makin	Labor	House of Reps	29 May 1954	1 November 1963	36 years, 37 days
Frank Brennan	Labor	House of Reps	8 February 1911	19 December 1931	35 years, 362 days
Frank Brennan	Labor	House of Reps	15 September 1934	31 October 1949	35 years, 362 days
Joe Clark	Labor	House of Reps	15 September 1934	29 September 1969	35 years, 15 days
Ian Sinclair	National	House of Reps	30 November 1963	31 August 1998	34 years, 275 days
David Watkins	Labor	House of Reps	29 March 1901	8 April 1935†	34 years, 11 days
Justin O'Byrne	Labor	Senate	1 July 1947	30 June 1981	34 years, 0 days
Bob Katter	National/Independent/KAP	House of Reps	13 March 1993	present	33 years, 191 days
John Howard	Liberal	House of Reps	18 May 1974	24 November 2007	33 years, 191 days
Alan Cadman	Liberal	House of Reps	18 May 1974	17 October 2007	33 years, 152 days
Gordon Brown	Labor	Senate	1 July 1932	30 June 1965	33 years, 0 days
Sir Littleton Groom	Protectionist/Liberal/Nationalist/UAP	House of Reps	14 September 1901	12 October 1929	32 years, 353 days
Sir Littleton Groom	Protectionist/Liberal/Nationalist/UAP	House of Reps	19 December 1931	6 November 1936†	32 years, 353 days
Sir Josiah Francis	Nationalist/UAP/Liberal	House of Reps	16 December 1922	4 November 1955	32 years, 324 days
Harold Holt	UAP/Liberal	House of Reps	17 August 1935	17 December 1967†	32 years, 123 days
Eddie Ward	Labor/Lang Labor	House of Reps	7 March 1931	19 December 1931	32 years, 99 days
Eddie Ward	Labor/Lang Labor	House of Reps	6 February 1932	31 July 1963†	32 years, 99 days
Kim Beazley Sr.	Labor	House of Reps	18 August 1945	10 November 1977	32 years, 85 days
Fred Daly	Labor	House of Reps	21 August 1943	11 November 1975	32 years, 83 days
Warren Snowdon	Labor	House of Reps	11 July 1987	2 March 1996	32 years, 60 days
Warren Snowdon	Labor	House of Reps	3 October 1998	11 April 2022	32 years, 60 days
Arthur Calwell	Labor	House of Reps	21 September 1940	2 November 1972	32 years, 43 days
Sir William McMahon	Liberal	House of Reps	10 December 1949	4 January 1982	32 years, 26 days
Patrick Lynch	Labor/Nationalist/UAP	Senate	1 January 1907	30 June 1938	31 years, 181 days
Sir Robert Menzies	UAP/Liberal	House of Reps	15 September 1934	17 February 1966	31 years, 156 days
Ron Boswell	National	Senate	5 March 1983	30 June 2014	31 years, 117 days
Tom Uren	Labor	House of Reps	22 November 1958	19 February 1990	31 years, 90 days
Kevin Andrews	Liberal	House of Reps	11 May 1991	11 April 2022	30 years, 335 days
James Scullin	Labor	House of Reps	13 April 1910	31 May 1913	30 years, 304 days
James Scullin	Labor	House of Reps	18 February 1922	31 October 1949	30 years, 304 days
Clyde Cameron	Labor	House of Reps	10 December 1949	19 September 1980	30 years, 285 days
Anthony Albanese	Labor	House of Reps	2 March 1996	present	30 years, 202 days
David Jull	Liberal	House of Reps	13 December 1975	5 March 1983	30 years, 39 days
David Jull	Liberal	House of Reps	1 December 1984	17 October 2007	30 years, 39 days
Bert Lazzarini	Labor	House of Reps	13 December 1919	19 December 1931	30 years, 24 days
Bert Lazzarini	Labor	House of Reps	15 September 1934	1 October 1952†	30 years, 24 days
Thomas Crawford	Nationalist/UAP/Independent	Senate	1 July 1917	30 June 1947	30 years, 0 days
Harry Foll	Nationalist/UAP/Liberal	Senate	1 July 1917	30 June 1947	30 years, 0 days
John Watson	Liberal	Senate	1 July 1978	30 June 2008	30 years, 0 days

†= Died in office

=== Longest service by women ===
Bronwyn Bishop served in the Australian parliament longer than any other woman, in October 2014 outstripping the record of 27 years and 119 days previously held by Kathy Sullivan. At the end of her term at the 2 July 2016 double dissolution, Bishop had served for 28 years and 274 days.

Name	Party	Chamber(s)	Start of service	End of service	Period of service
Bronwyn Bishop	Liberal	Senate	11 July 1987	24 February 1994	28 years, 272 days
Bronwyn Bishop	Liberal	House of Reps	26 March 1994	9 May 2016	28 years, 272 days
Tanya Plibersek	Labor	House of Reps	3 October 1998	present	27 years, 352 days
Kathy Sullivan	Liberal	Senate	18 May 1974	5 November 1984	27 years, 117 days
Kathy Sullivan	Liberal	House of Reps	1 December 1984	8 October 2001	27 years, 117 days
Marise Payne	Liberal	Senate	9 April 1997	30 September 2023	26 years, 174 days
Catherine King	Labor	House of Reps	10 November 2001	present	24 years, 314 days
Dorothy Tangney	Labor	Senate	21 August 1943	30 June 1968	24 years, 314 days
Sussan Ley	Liberal	House of Reps	10 November 2001	27 February 2026	24 years, 109 days
Penny Wong	Labor	Senate	1 July 2002	present	24 years, 81 days
Annabelle Rankin	Liberal	Senate	1 July 1947	24 April 1971	23 years, 297 days
Maria Vamvakinou	Labor	House of Reps	10 November 2001	28 March 2025	23 years, 138 days
Jenny Macklin	Labor	House of Reps	2 March 1996	11 April 2019	23 years, 40 days
Amanda Vanstone	Liberal	Senate	1 December 1984	26 April 2007	22 years, 146 days
Justine Elliot	Labor	House of Reps	9 October 2004	present	21 years, 346 days
Margaret Reid	Liberal	Senate	5 May 1981	14 February 2003	21 years, 285 days
Ivy Wedgwood	Liberal	Senate	22 February 1950	30 June 1971	21 years, 128 days
Helen Polley	Labor	Senate	1 July 2005	present	21 years, 81 days
Carol Brown	Labor	Senate	5 August 2005	present	21 years, 46 days
Kay Patterson	Liberal	Senate	11 July 1987	30 June 2008	20 years, 355 days
Jacinta Collins	Labor	Senate	3 May 1995	30 June 2005	20 years, 341 days
Jacinta Collins	Labor	Senate	8 May 2008	15 February 2019	20 years, 341 days
Sue Knowles	Liberal	Senate	1 December 1984	30 June 2005	20 years, 211 days
Julie Bishop	Liberal	House of Reps	3 October 1998	11 April 2019	20 years, 190 days
Judi Moylan	Liberal	House of Reps	13 March 1993	5 August 2013	20 years, 145 days
Sharman Stone	Liberal	House of Reps	2 March 1996	9 May 2016	20 years, 68 days

== Chronological list ==
This section lists the members of parliament (and of each chamber) with the longest continuous service at any given time. The longest-serving MPs in each chamber are sometimes referred to as the "Father of the House" and "Father of the Senate", and very rarely the overall longest-serving MP is called the "Father of the Parliament".

House of Representatives Practice describes the title "Father of the House" as a "completely informal designation" with "no functions attached to it".

Odgers' Australian Senate Practice notes that the title "Father of the Senate" is "now seldom referred to or used". It further notes that "as no woman senator has ever been in this situation, it is not clear what the title would be in that circumstance". Since then, the title was assumed by Marise Payne, the longest serving female senator in Australia's history. After Payne's resignation took effect, Penny Wong, also a woman, became the longest serving incumbent senator. The term "Mother of the Senate" has been used to refer to Dame Annabelle Rankin, who was jointly the longest-serving senator with Bert Hendrickson and Justin O'Byrne.

From	To	Overall	Senate	Continuous term started	House	Continuous term started
29/30 March 1901	14 September 1923	Nil	Nil	n/a	Nil	n/a
15 September 1923	8 April 1935	Nil	Sir George Pearce	29 March 1901	Billy Hughes; David Watkins	n/a
9 April 1935	30 June 1938	Nil	Sir George Pearce	29 March 1901	Billy Hughes	30 March 1901
1 July 1938	30 June 1947	Billy Hughes MP	Thomas Crawford; Harry Foll	1 July 1917	Billy Hughes	30 March 1901
1 July 1947	30 June 1950	Billy Hughes MP	Gordon Brown; Joe Collings	1 July 1932	Billy Hughes	30 March 1901
1 July 1950	28 October 1952	Billy Hughes MP	Gordon Brown	1 July 1932	Billy Hughes	30 March 1901
29 October 1952	9 December 1961	Sir Earle Page MP	Gordon Brown	1 July 1932	Sir Earle Page	13 December 1919
10 December 1961	31 July 1963	Eddie Ward MP	Gordon Brown	1 July 1932	Eddie Ward	6 February 1932
1 August 1963	30 June 1965	Senator; Gordon Brown	Gordon Brown	1 July 1932	Joe Clark; John McEwen; Sir Robert Menzies	15 September 1934
1 July 1965	16 February 1966	Joe Clark MP; John McEwen MP; Sir Robert Menzies MP	Sir Walter Cooper	1 July 1935	Joe Clark; John McEwen; Sir Robert Menzies	15 September 1934
17 February 1966	30 June 1968	Joe Clark MP; John McEwen MP	Sir Walter Cooper	1 July 1935	Joe Clark; John McEwen	15 September 1934
1 July 1968	29 September 1969	Joe Clark MP; John McEwen MP	Bert Hendrickson; Justin O'Byrne; Dame Annabelle Rankin	1 July 1947	Joe Clark; John McEwen	15 September 1934
30 September 1969	1 February 1971	John McEwen MP	Bert Hendrickson; Justin O'Byrne; Dame Annabelle Rankin	1 July 1947	John McEwen	15 September 1934
2 February 1971	24 May 1971	Arthur Calwell MP	Bert Hendrickson; Justin O'Byrne; Dame Annabelle Rankin	1 July 1947	Arthur Calwell	21 September 1940
25 May 1971	30 June 1971	Arthur Calwell MP	Bert Hendrickson; Justin O'Byrne	1 July 1947	Arthur Calwell	21 September 1940
1 July 1971	2 November 1972	Arthur Calwell MP	Justin O'Byrne	1 July 1947	Arthur Calwell	21 September 1940
3 November 1972	11 November 1975	Fred Daly MP	Justin O'Byrne	1 July 1947	Fred Daly	21 August 1943
12 November 1975	10 November 1977	Kim Beazley Sr. MP	Justin O'Byrne	1 July 1947	Kim Beazley Sr.	18 August 1945
11 November 1977	19 September 1980	Senator; Justin O'Byrne	Justin O'Byrne	1 July 1947	Clyde Cameron; Sir William McMahon	10 December 1949
20 September 1980	30 June 1981	Senator; Justin O'Byrne	Justin O'Byrne	1 July 1947	Sir William McMahon	10 December 1949
1 July 1981	4 January 1982	Sir William McMahon MP	Doug McClelland	1 July 1962	Sir William McMahon	10 December 1949
5 January 1982	31 March 1983	Malcolm Fraser MP; Sir James Killen MP; Sir Billy Snedden MP	Doug McClelland	1 July 1962	Malcolm Fraser; Sir James Killen; Sir Billy Snedden	10 December 1955
1 April 1983	21 April 1983	Sir James Killen MP; Sir Billy Snedden MP	Doug McClelland	1 July 1962	Sir James Killen; Sir Billy Snedden	10 December 1955
22 April 1983	15 August 1983	Sir James Killen MP	Doug McClelland	1 July 1962	Sir James Killen	10 December 1955
16 August 1983	18 January 1984	Doug Anthony MP	Doug McClelland	1 July 1962	Doug Anthony	14 September 1957
19 January 1984	23 January 1987	Tom Uren MP	Doug McClelland	1 July 1962	Tom Uren	22 November 1958
24 January 1987	27 February 1989	Tom Uren MP	Arthur Gietzelt; Peter Durack	1 July 1971	Tom Uren	22 November 1958
28 February 1989	19 February 1990	Tom Uren MP	Peter Durack	1 July 1971	Tom Uren	22 November 1958
20 February 1990	30 June 1993	Ian Sinclair MP	Peter Durack	1 July 1971	Ian Sinclair	30 November 1963
1 July 1993	31 August 1998	Ian Sinclair MP	Mal Colston; Brian Harradine	13 December 1975	Ian Sinclair	30 November 1963
1 September 1998	30 June 1999	Philip Ruddock MP	Mal Colston; Brian Harradine	13 December 1975	Philip Ruddock	22 September 1973
1 July 1999	30 June 2005	Philip Ruddock MP	Brian Harradine	13 December 1975	Philip Ruddock	22 September 1973
1 July 2005	30 June 2008	Philip Ruddock MP	John Watson	1 July 1978	Philip Ruddock	22 September 1973
1 July 2008	30 June 2014	Philip Ruddock MP	Ron Boswell	5 March 1983	Philip Ruddock	22 September 1973
1 July 2014	6 February 2015	Philip Ruddock MP	John Faulkner	4 April 1989	Philip Ruddock	22 September 1973
6 February 2015	9 May 2016	Philip Ruddock MP	Ian Macdonald	1 July 1990	Philip Ruddock	22 September 1973
9 May 2016	30 June 2019	Senator; Ian Macdonald	Ian Macdonald	1 July 1990	Kevin Andrews	11 May 1991
1 July 2019	11 April 2022	Kevin Andrews MP	Kim Carr	28 April 1993	Kevin Andrews	11 May 1991
11 April 2022	1 July 2022	Bob Katter MP	Kim Carr	28 April 1993	Bob Katter	13 March 1993
1 July 2022	30 September 2023	Bob Katter MP	Marise Payne	9 April 1997	Bob Katter	13 March 1993
30 September 2023	present	Bob Katter MP	Penny Wong	1 July 2002	Bob Katter	13 March 1993

== Longest-serving members by state and territory ==
State / Territory	Longest-serving members		
State / Territory	Upper house	Overall	Lower house
Australian Capital Territory	Margaret Reid; 21 years, 285 days 1981–2003	Bob McMullan; 22 years, 86 days 1988–1996 (S), 1996–2010 (H)	Jim Fraser; 18 years, 338 days 1951–1970
New South Wales	Stan Amour; 26 years, 364 days 1938–1965	Billy Hughes; 45 years, 354 days 1901–1917, 1922–1952	
Northern Territory	Nigel Scullion; 17 years, 232 days 2001–2019	Warren Snowdon; 32 years, 60 days 1987–1996, 1998–2022	
Queensland	Walter Cooper; 36 years, 227 days 1928–1932, 1935–1968		Bob Katter; 33 years, 191 days 1993–
South Australia	Robert Hill; 24 years, 257 days 1981–2006	Norman Makin; 36 years, 37 days 1919–1946, 1955–1963	
Tasmania	Justin O'Byrne; 34 years, 0 days 1947–1981		Gil Duthie; 29 years, 76 days 1946–1975
Victoria	Kim Carr; 29 years, 63 days 1993–2022	William Maloney; 36 years, 151 days 1904–1940	
Western Australia	George Pearce; 37 years, 93 days 1901–1938		Kim Beazley Sr. 32 years, 145 days 1945–1977

== See also ==
- Longest-serving members of the Parliament of Victoria
- List of Australian heads of government by time in office
- List of prime ministers of Australia by time in office
- List of members of the United States Congress by longevity of service
- List of historical longest-serving members of the United States Congress
- List of longest-serving members of the New Zealand House of Representatives
- Members of the Malaysian Parliament who have served for at least 30 years
- Records of members of the Oireachtas (Ireland)
- Records of members of parliament of the United Kingdom
