= Reg Murray =

New Zealand-born Australian politician

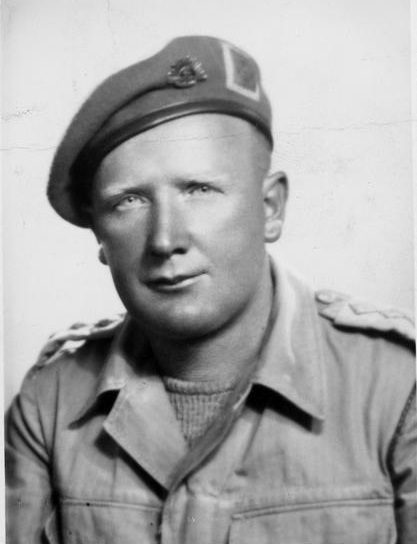

Senator for Tasmania
- In office 1 July 1947 – 19 March 1951

Personal details
- Born: 25 April 1909 Wellington, New Zealand
- Died: 25 November 1962 (aged 53) Hobart, Tasmania, Australia
- Party: Labor
- Spouse: Edith Nash (m. 1937)
- Occupation: Clerk

Reginald James Murray (25 April 1909 – 25 November 1962) was an Australian politician. He was a member of the Australian Labor Party (ALP) and served as a Senator for Tasmania from 1947 to 1951. Prior to entering politics he worked in the shipping industry and was a World War II veteran.

== Early life ==
Murray was born on 27 April 1906 in Wellington, New Zealand. He was the son of Nellie (née Miller) and Walter James Murray. His mother was born in Hobart, Tasmania, and his father in Edinburgh, Scotland.

Murray's father worked as a travelling salesman and the family spent periods in New Zealand and Brisbane before settling in his mother's home town. He attended the Goulburn Street State School in West Hobart and went on to complete his intermediate certificate at Hobart High School. He played for the Lefroy Football Club from 1925 to 1932 and represented Tasmania in interstate matches in 1927 and 1929. After leaving school Murray worked in various roles in the shipping industry, including as a stevedore, seaman and shipping clerk. He later worked on the clerical staff of Australian National Airways in Hobart.

Murray enlisted in the Militia in November 1939, having previously been a member of the Royal Australian Naval Volunteer Reserve for seven years. He transferred to the Australian Imperial Force in August 1942 as a lieutenant. He served in the Australian Intelligence Corps and the 16th Australian Small Ships Company, in 1943 completing a certificate in military intelligence in Liverpool, England. He later served in New Guinea from December 1944 to February 1946 and was formally discharged from the AIF in January 1947.

== Senator, 1947–1951 ==
In August 1946, Murray was unexpectedly placed on first position on the ALP's Senate ticket in Tasmania for the 1946 federal election. He was chosen after two previous candidates withdrew from the ticket: Ernest West withdrew due to factional conflict and Mervyn McNeair withdrew due to a professional conflict. Murray was elected to a six-year term commencing on 1 July 1947. He polled the most votes of any Senate candidate in the state, with campaign material drawing on his status as "a young, forceful ex-serviceman".

In parliament, Murray served on three select committees relating to the banking industry, national service and war gratuities. He spoke frequently on Tasmanian issues and matters relating to ex-servicemen, and was a strong supporter of the Tasmanian whaling industry and exploitation of the Australian Antarctic Territory. He was interested in the Territory of Papua and New Guinea as a result of his war service and spoke at length on the Papua and New Guinea Act 1949 where he was critical of the previous Australian administration. In 1948 he was a member of the first parliamentary delegation to post-war Japan where he met Emperor Hirohito.

Murray's term in the Senate was cut short by a double dissolution in 1951. He was defeated for re-election at the 1951 federal election after being placed last on Labor's ticket in Tasmania.

== Later career ==
After his defeat, Murray became private secretary to his Tasmanian ALP colleague Nick McKenna and was state treasurer of the ALP from 1954 until his death in 1962. He made three unsuccessful attempts to re-enter parliament, standing for the Senate at the 1953 and 1958 elections and in the seat of Braddon at the 1955 election. In 1953, he and incumbent senator Bill Aylett tied in the preselection balloting, with Murray placed above Aylett on the ticket after his name was drawn from a hat. Aylett then mounted a strong personal campaign and issued his own campaign material in defiance of ALP how-to-vote cards, allowing him to win re-election at Murray's expense. Murray subsequently wrote privately to Fred Daly that Aylett had won re-election "by treachery, fraud and wilful deception".

Murray also became more active in the labour movement, serving a term as state president of the Federated Clerks' Union and acting as minute secretary to the Australian Council of Trade Unions congress in Hobart in 1959. He attended the International Labour Organization's conference in Geneva in 1959 as an Australian delegate and also visited Russia and the United States.

== Personal life ==
In 1937, Murray married Edith Nash (née Stepto), who had one son from a previous marriage. He died in Hobart on 25 November 1962, aged 53, after collapsing in his car.
