= Frederick Ward (Australian politician) =

Australian politician

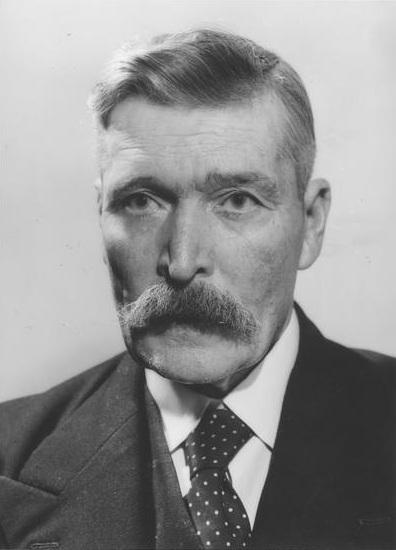

Senator for South Australia
- In office 1 July 1947 – 28 April 1951

Personal details
- Born: 11 May 1872 Bowden, South Australia
- Died: 31 December 1954 (aged 82) Largs Bay, South Australia
- Party: Labor

Frederick Furner Ward (11 May 1872 – 31 December 1954) was a businessman, socialist, union official and politician in South Australia.

== Education and career ==
Born in Bowden, South Australia to Eliza née Sheils and Frederick Rousseau Ward a miller. He was educated at state schools before becoming a clerk, accountant and commercial traveller. He rose to be the manager of a timber, iron and furniture business.

A founding member of the South Australian Labor Party, he was a member or official of various trade unions, playing a prominent role in the Port Adelaide Trades and Labor Council and the United Trades and Labor Council.

He was elected secretary of the South Australian branch of the Labor Party in 1923 and would hold the role until 1944.

In 1931 there was an intense dispute about the handling of the response to the Great Depression in Australia and the Labor Party split into three. The brothers Doug and Ken Bardolph led a breakaway Lang Labor Party, which supported the plan of New South Wales Premier Jack Lang, that successfully contested a by-election in July 1931. I

In August 1931, 23 of Labor's 30 House of Assembly members and two of Labor's four Legislative Council members were expelled from the party for voting in favour of the Premiers' Plan. Ward became the public face of what remained of the party, supported by the trades and labor council. Membership of the branch dropped from 30,000 to less than 10,000 in the space of three years. Ward himself was financially secure, having become a property owner and landlord, however the experience of the depression saw him shift to the political left and embrace socialism, joining the South Australian Socialist League in 1942 and becoming its secretary.

Ward was defeated as Labor branch secretary in September 1944, his defeat celebrated as a major victory for B. A. Santamaria's Catholic Social Studies Movement.

He was selected to be third place on Labor's senate ticket for the 1946 federal election, with Labor winning all three seats. At the age of 74, Ward was the oldest person to take his seat for the first time in the Senate. Labor was defending seven seats at the 1951 federal election, Ward was sixth on the Labor ticket and was defeated.

== Death ==
Ward died in Largs Bay on New Year's Eve 1954, aged 82.
