= James Arnold (Australian politician) =

Australian politician

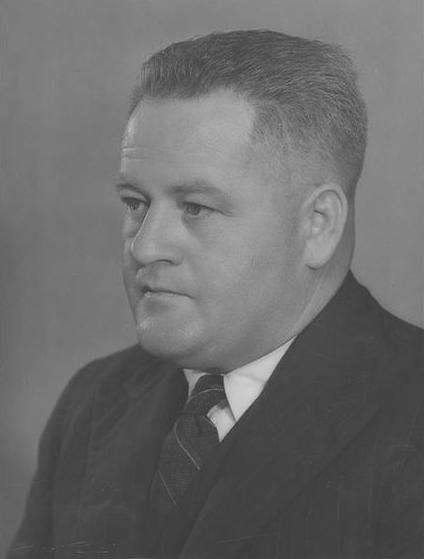

Senator for New South Wales
- In office 1 July 1941 – 30 June 1965

Personal details
- Born: 12 April 1902 Wallaroo, South Australia
- Died: 29 October 1967 (aged 65) Newcastle, New South Wales, Australia
- Party: Australian Labor Party
- Occupation: Railway worker, accountant

James Jarvist Arnold (12 April 1902 – 29 October 1967) was an Australian politician. He was an Australian Labor Party member of the Australian Senate for New South Wales from 1940 to 1967.

Arnold was born at Wallaroo Mines in South Australia and was educated at St Joseph's School in Kadina and Christian Brothers College in Adelaide. He worked as private secretary to the managing director of an insurance company and then for a motor firm. Arnold then moved to Sydney c. 1928 to become a probationary firefighter, later moving to Newcastle c. 1930, where he was assigned to the Newcastle East Fire Brigade. He studied accountancy alongside his work there, and qualified as an accountant in 1937, but remained a firefighter until his election to parliament. Arnold was president of the Newcastle Fire Brigades Association, a delegate to the Newcastle Trade Hall Council, secretary of the Newcastle Workers' Educational Association, a member of the Newcastle School of Arts Committee, secretary of the Newcastle branch of the Labor Party, president of the party's Newcastle state assembly and secretary of its Newcastle regional assembly. He was a fellow of the Federal Institute of Accounts and the Chartered Institute of Secretaries.

Arnold was elected to the Senate at the 1940 federal election, and was re-elected four times. He was temporary chairman of committees from 1941 to 1951, was an assistant to Minister for the Navy and Munitions Norman Makin during World War II and after the war was deputy chairman of the Australian Shipbuilding Board and the parliamentary representative on the Commonwealth Council of National Fitness. In 1957, he was in hospital recovering from surgery when the Menzies government refused him a pair on controversial proposed banking legislation; with his vote critical in a tightly divided Senate, Arnold was brought to Parliament House in an ambulance and had to attend Senate proceedings in a wheelchair and hospital garb in order to defeat the bill. He lost Labor preselection to Les Haylen for the 1964 Senate-only election, and left office when his term expired in 1965.

Arnold died in October 1967 at Royal Newcastle Hospital and was cremated at what is now the Newcastle Memorial Park.

He married Ida Isabelle Brent on 6 August 1935; they had four children.
