= William Large =

Australian politician

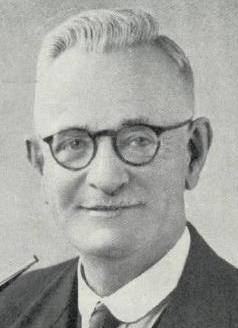

Senator for New South Wales
- In office 1 July 1941 – 19 March 1951

Personal details
- Born: 28 March 1878 Northfleet, Kent, England
- Died: 2 March 1964 (aged 85) Blakehurst, New South Wales, Australia
- Party: Labor
- Spouse: Clara Osborne (m. 1911)
- Occupation: Tradesman

William James Large (28 March 1878 – 2 March 1964) was an Australian politician. He was a member of the Australian Labor Party (ALP) and served as a Senator for New South Wales from 1941 to 1951. He was a tradesman before entering politics and had a long involvement with the Amalgamated Engineering Union.

== Early life ==
Large was born on 28 March 1878 in Northfleet, Kent, England. He was the son of Sophia (née Lancaster) and James Large. His father worked as a fitter and was blacklisted for his involvement in the British labour movement.

Large was educated at St Botolph's Church of England School in Northfleet. After leaving school he worked for the armaments division of Vickers Limited. He immigrated to Australia in 1908 and began working for the British Australian Timber Company on the north coast of New South Wales. He was initially employed as a labourer but after joining the Amalgamated Society of Engineers (ASE) was able to resume his previous role as a skilled tradesman.

Large later moved to Sydney where he was employed at the Eveleigh Railway Workshops. He had a longstanding involvement with the ASE, which became the Amalgamated Engineering Union, serving on the union's executive from 1911 to 1949 and appearing as an expert witness and advocate at arbitration hearings. After a period living in Redfern, Large settled in South Hurstville where he was active in local community organisations and sporting clubs. He was active in the Blakehurst Progress Association and was credited by The Propeller with playing a key role in the resumption of Carss Bush Park as a public reserve.

== Politics ==
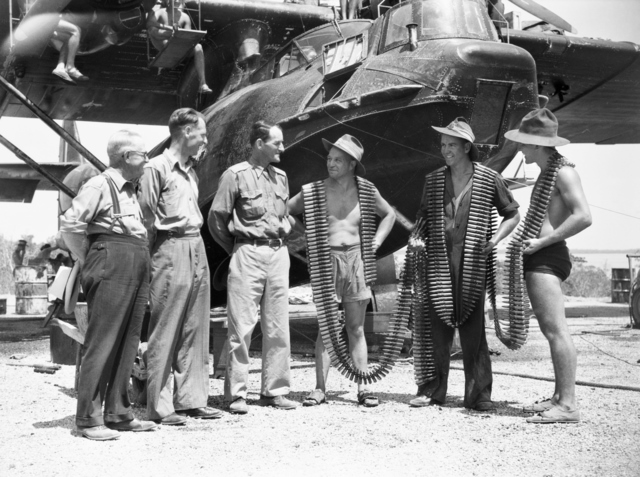
Senator Large, left, with other members of the Parliamentary War Expenditure Committee, visits No. 20 Squadron RAAF, Darwin, 16 October 1944

Large had been a member of the Independent Labour Party while living in England. After moving to Australia he joined the South Hurstville branch of the Australian Labor Party. He described himself as a "convinced socialist" and was avowedly anti-capitalist.

At the 1940 federal election, Large was elected to a six-year Senate term commencing on 1 July 1941, running in third position on the ALP's ticket in New South Wales. He had originally won Labor preselection for the seat of Barton, but withdrew his candidacy in favour of H. V. Evatt and was rewarded with a position on the Senate ticket, despite his relatively unknown status in the party.

Large was re-elected to another six-year term at the 1946 election. His second term was cut short by a double dissolution and he was defeated for re-election at the 1951 election. In the Senate, Large served on the Joint Committee on Profits from 1941 to 1943 and on the Joint Committee on War Expenditure from 1943 to 1946. He was also a member of the Standing Committee on Regulations and Ordinances from 1941 to 1947, including a period as chairman.

== Personal life ==
In 1911, Large married Clara Osborne, with whom he had one daughter. He died on 2 March 1964 in Blakehurst, New South Wales, aged 86.
