= Richard Nash (Australian politician) =

Australian politician (1890–1951)

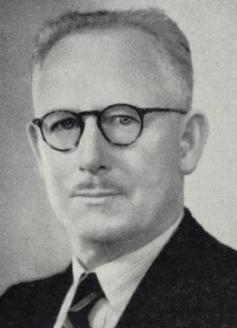

Senator for Western Australia
- In office 21 August 1943 – 12 December 1951
- Succeeded by: Joe Cooke

Personal details
- Born: 2 July 1890 Ascot Vale, Victoria
- Died: 12 December 1951 (aged 61) Subiaco, Western Australia
- Party: Australian Labor Party
- Occupation: Tramway worker

Richard Harry (Dick) Nash (2 July 1890 – 12 December 1951) was an Australian politician. He was an Australian Labor Party member of the Australian Senate from 1943 until his death in 1951.

Nash was born in the Melbourne suburb of Ascot Vale and moved with his family to Kalgoorlie in Western Australia in 1897. He received a primary education in Boulder then apprenticed as a mechanic and worked for the Kalgoorlie Miner newspaper as mechanic and proofreader. In 1910, he was employed by the Kalgoorlie tramways, serving as conductor, motorman and inspector, and being a founding member and later secretary of the Kalgoorlie Tramways Employees Union until 1916. In 1916, Nash relocated to Perth and worked on the Perth tramways. Nas was president of the Perth Tramways Employees Union in 1917-18 and 1922, when he transferred to the role of union secretary, serving in that capacity for many years thereafter. He was also secretary of the Labor Day Committee c. 1923.

Nash served variously as trustee, treasurer, president and (from 1939) secretary of the Metropolitan District Council of the state Labor Party between 1917 and 1943. He was acting general secretary of the state branch in 1939, state vice-president from 1941 to 1943 and a delegate to the federal executive at the time of his election to parliament. He was a Municipality of Subiaco councillor from 1932 to 1935 and again from 1935 to 1944. Other roles in the late 1930s and 1940s included member of the Metropolitan Market Trust, member of the Advisory Committee of the Perth Hospital and member of the State Manpower Board.

Nash was elected to the Australian Senate at the 1943 election and was due to take his seat in July 1944, but was instead appointed to a casual vacancy caused by the death of Senator James Cunningham. He was re-elected at the 1951 election, but died suddenly in office from a heart attack in December that year and was buried at Karrakatta Cemetery.
