= Jack Devlin (Australian politician) =

Australian politician

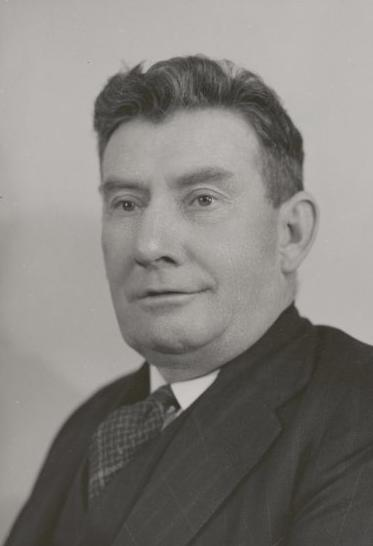

Senator for Victoria
- In office 28 September 1946 – 26 May 1957
- Preceded by: Alexander Fraser
- Succeeded by: Charles Sandford

Personal details
- Born: 6 January 1900 Violet Town, Victoria
- Died: 26 May 1957 (aged 57) Tamleugh, Victoria
- Party: Labor
- Spouse: Jane Dixon (m. 1934)
- Occupation: Farmer

John Joseph Devlin (6 January 1900 – 26 May 1957) was an Australian politician. He was a member of the Australian Labor Party (ALP) and served as a Senator for Victoria from 1946 to 1957.

== Early life ==
Devlin was born on 6 January 1900 in Violet Town, Victoria. He was the son of Bidelia (née Fitzgerald) and John Devlin. His father was a farmer and "pioneer of the Benalla district".

Devlin attended the state schools at Tamleugh and Tamleugh North. After leaving school he farmed at Tamleugh and was a member of the Victorian Wheat and Woolgrowers' Association. He was active in the local district tennis and rifle associations and was a life governor of the district hospital at Wangaratta. In 1953 it was reported that he was still farming on the property at Tamleugh that his father had established 50 years earlier.

== Politics ==
Devlin joined the Australian Labor Party (ALP) during World War I and was active in the anti-conscription movement. He was a founding member of the Tamleugh branch of the ALP in 1919 and served as a delegate to the party's state conference from 1921. He was elected to the central executive in 1924 and would remain a member until 1952, serving as state president from 1937 to 1938.

In 1927, Devlin was elected to the Violet Town Shire Council. He was elected to three one-year terms as shire president: in 1933, 1939 and 1948. He presided over the shire's centenary celebrations in 1949. Devlin first stood for parliament at the 1937 state election, running unsuccessfully in the seat of Benalla. He also stood unsuccessfully in Indi at the 1940 federal election.

=== Senator, 1946-1957 ===
Devlin was elected to the Senate at the 1946 federal election, filling the remainder of the term commenced by Richard Keane. He was re-elected at the 1949, 1951 and 1953 elections.

Devlin made his first and only speech to the Senate on 7 November 1946, where he "advocated a range of rural proposals, including reafforestation, the decentralization of industry, the establishment of additional water supply schemes, the provision of good roads, particularly cross-country roads, and improved post and telephone services". In 1953 he stated that his primary concern in politics was "getting fair treatment for the man on the land" and that he supported a statewide marketing system for agricultural products. Devlin's parliamentary contributions were limited. He served on only one Senate committee, from 1946 to 1949. In part due to his health, he did not speak at all in the Senate for the final seven years of his service, following a question on wool tax in 1951.

Devlin suffered from poor health throughout his parliamentary service, including "a series of small strokes". In 1948 he was hospitalised in Canberra after falling down the steps of Parliament House. In 1952 he collapsed at his home in Tamleugh and was hospitalised, which was attributed to a stomach ailment. In 1956 Devlin suffered a major stroke which left him partially paralysed. He was granted two months of medical leave from parliament.

During the Australian Labor Party split of 1955, Devlin remained loyal to the ALP although his Irish Catholic background led some to assume that he would affiliate with the breakaway Anti-Communist Labor Party. His ALP membership was briefly suspended in April 1955 during a mass expulsion of members associated with the Industrial Groups. He successfully appealed his suspension after pledging his loyal to the state executive and stating that any association with the breakaway groups had been inadvertent.

== Personal life ==
In 1934, Devlin married Jane Dixon, with whom he had three daughters. He died on 26 May 1957 at his home in Tamleugh, Victoria, after a period of illness.
