= Ted Mattner =

Australian politician and soldier

The Honourable Ted Mattner
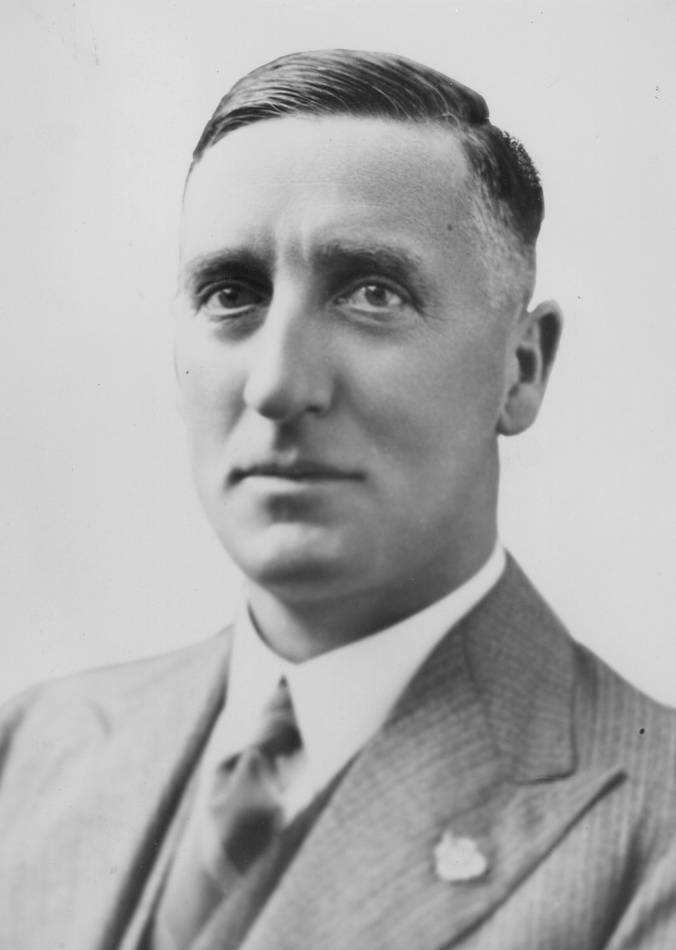

President of the Australian Senate
- In office 12 June 1951 – 7 September 1953
- Preceded by: Gordon Brown
- Succeeded by: Alister McMullin

Senator for South Australia
- In office 10 October 1944 – 27 September 1946
- Preceded by: Oliver Uppill
- Succeeded by: Fred Beerworth
- In office 22 February 1950 – 30 June 1968

Personal details
- Born: 16 September 1893 Oakbank, South Australia
- Died: 21 December 1977 (aged 84) Daw Park, South Australia
- Party: Liberal

Military service
- Allegiance: Australia
- Branch/service: Australian Imperial Force; Second Australian Imperial Force
- Years of service: 1915–1919; 1941–1942
- Rank: Major
- Unit: 18th Battery, 6th Field Artillery (1915–19); 13th Field Regiment (1941–42)
- Battles/wars: First World War; Western Front; Second World War; South West Pacific theatre
- Awards: Military Cross; Distinguished Conduct Medal; Military Medal

Edward William Mattner, MC, DCM, MM (16 September 1893 – 21 December 1977) was an Australian politician and soldier who served as a Senator for South Australia from 1944 to 1946 and 1950 to 1968. He was president of the Senate from 1951 to 1953.

== Early life ==
Mattner was born on 16 September 1893 in Oakbank, South Australia. He was the third of four children born to Emily Louisa (née Hocking) and William Charles Mattner. His father was a gardener who later took up farming.

Matter was raised in Oakbank and attended the local state school, becoming a pupil-teacher at the age of 14. He later attended Adelaide High School from 1910 to 1912 and then in 1914 enrolled at the Teachers' Training College in Adelaide. Before enrolling in the military he worked as an assistant teacher at Uraidla, Parkside and Kadina.

== Military service ==
Mattner enlisted in the Australian Imperial Force (AIF) in September 1915. He was sent to the Western Front in March 1916 as a gunner in the 18th Battery, 6th Field Artillery Brigade. He was awarded the Military Medal for his role in an action at Ploegsteert Wood in June 1917, where he "braved enemy shells and exploding ammunition to extinguish fires in the brigade's gun-pits".

In September 1917, Mattner assumed command when his battery commander was wounded by German shelling at Hooge, for which he was awarded the Distinguished Conduct Medal. He was commissioned as a second lieutenant the following month and received the Military Cross for his actions a few weeks later at Zillebeke, where he "again risked enemy shell-fire and led a party which rescued wounded infantrymen". Mattner returned to Australia in September 1919 and was discharged from the AIF with the rank of lieutenant. He was personally presented with the Military Cross by King George V.

== Politics ==
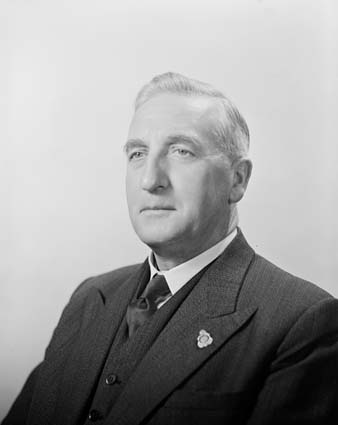
Mattner in 1956

In 1944, he was appointed to the Australian Senate as a United Australia Party Senator for South Australia, filling the casual vacancy caused by the resignation of Oliver Uppill. Soon after his appointment, the UAP became the Liberal Party. Defeated in an attempt at re-election in 1946, he returned to the Senate in 1949. On 12 June 1951, he was elected President of the Senate, a position he held until 7 September 1953, when he was succeeded by Alister McMullin. He held his Senate seat until his retirement in 1967. Mattner died in 1977.

Parliament of Australia
Preceded by Gordon Brown	President of the Senate; 1951–1953	Succeeded by Alister McMullin
