= Gordon Brown (Australian politician) =

Australian politician (1885–1967)

The Honourable Gordon Brown
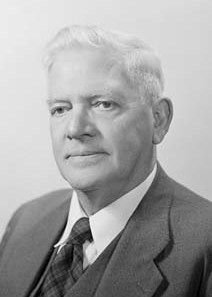
- Brown in 1956

President of the Senate
- In office 23 September 1943 – 19 March 1951
- Preceded by: James Cunningham
- Succeeded by: Ted Mattner

Senator for Queensland
- In office 1 July 1932 – 30 June 1965

Personal details
- Born: 11 February 1885 Chesterfield, Derbyshire, England
- Died: 12 January 1967 (aged 81) Brisbane, Queensland, Australia
- Party: Labor
- Other political affiliations: Social Democratic Federation (UK); Socialist Party of Canada
- Spouse: Beatrice Hinchsliff (m. 1914)
- Occupation: Unionist

Gordon Brown (11 February 1885 – 12 January 1967) was an Australian politician who served as a Senator for Queensland from 1932 to 1965, representing the Australian Labor Party (ALP). He was President of the Senate from 1943 to 1951.

== Early life ==
Brown was born on 11 February 1885, in Chesterfield, Derbyshire, England. He was the son of Jane (born Woodcock) and William Brown, who was a bootmaker and Methodist lay preacher. Brown attended Clay Cross Grammar School on a scholarship and was then apprenticed to a patternmaker at a steam-engine manufacturing company. He had a "restless disposition" and also briefly worked as a piano salesman and in a coal mine in the north of England. He was a member of the Social Democratic Federation and became "steeped in Marxian theory".

=== Canada ===
In 1908, Brown moved to Canada where he became involved with the Socialist Party of Canada. His first major political speech was a three-hour address in Victoria, British Columbia. He stood unsuccessfully for the House of Commons in Victoria City at the 1911 federal election. Brown became disillusioned with the movement's lack of success and doctrinaire nature. He was briefly imprisoned for street agitation, and subsequently returned to England.

=== Move to Australia ===
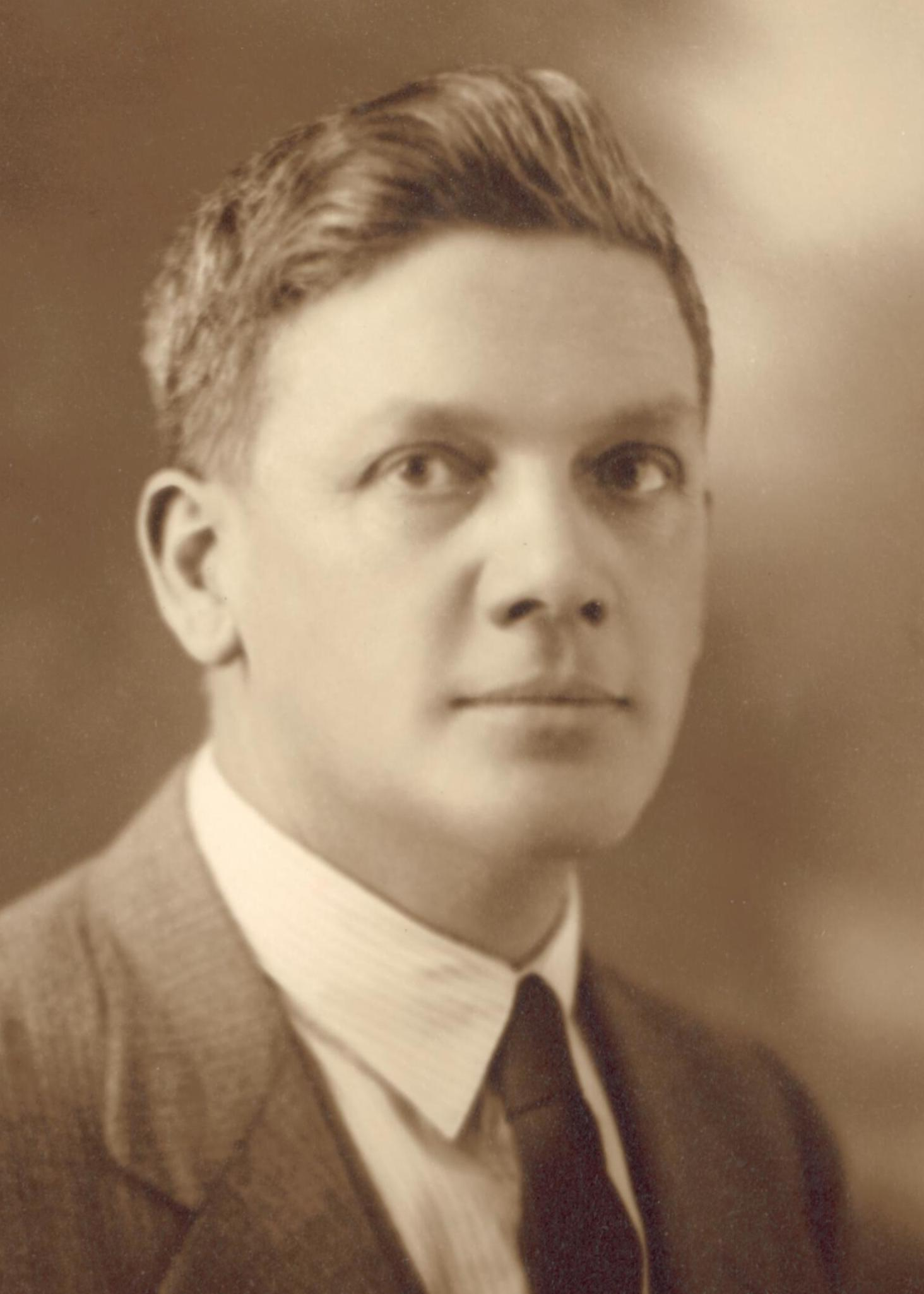
Gordon Brown in 1932

Brown arrived in Sydney in 1912 and, within a few months, was president of the Sydney branch of the Australasian Socialist Party. Shortly after, he was arrested for illegal public speaking in Wollongong. He and a friend walked to Brisbane in April 1913, where he was again gaoled for speaking without a permit. He married Beatrice Agnes Hinchsliff in 1914, with whom he had three children. Brown became the organising secretary of the Brisbane branch of the Socialist Party, and was a regular contributor to The International Socialist. By 1917, he was involved with the Industrial Workers of the World, travelling around Queensland giving speeches. His activities drew the attention of the Commonwealth Investigation Branch, which reported that he was involved with "the worst revolutionary elements of Brisbane". He applied for a passport to travel to Russia and study Bolshevism, but was refused.

In the lead-up to the 1917 conscription plebiscite, Brown was employed as an organiser by the Anti-Conscription Campaign Committee. His radicalism waned, and he later found work as an agent for the Metropolitan Life Insurance Company and as a salesman for Finney Isles and Co., a furniture and drapery firm. He joined the Shop Assistants' Union, serving as an organiser and vice-president and, from 1925 to 1927, served as vice-president of the Trades and Labour Council of Queensland.

== Politics ==
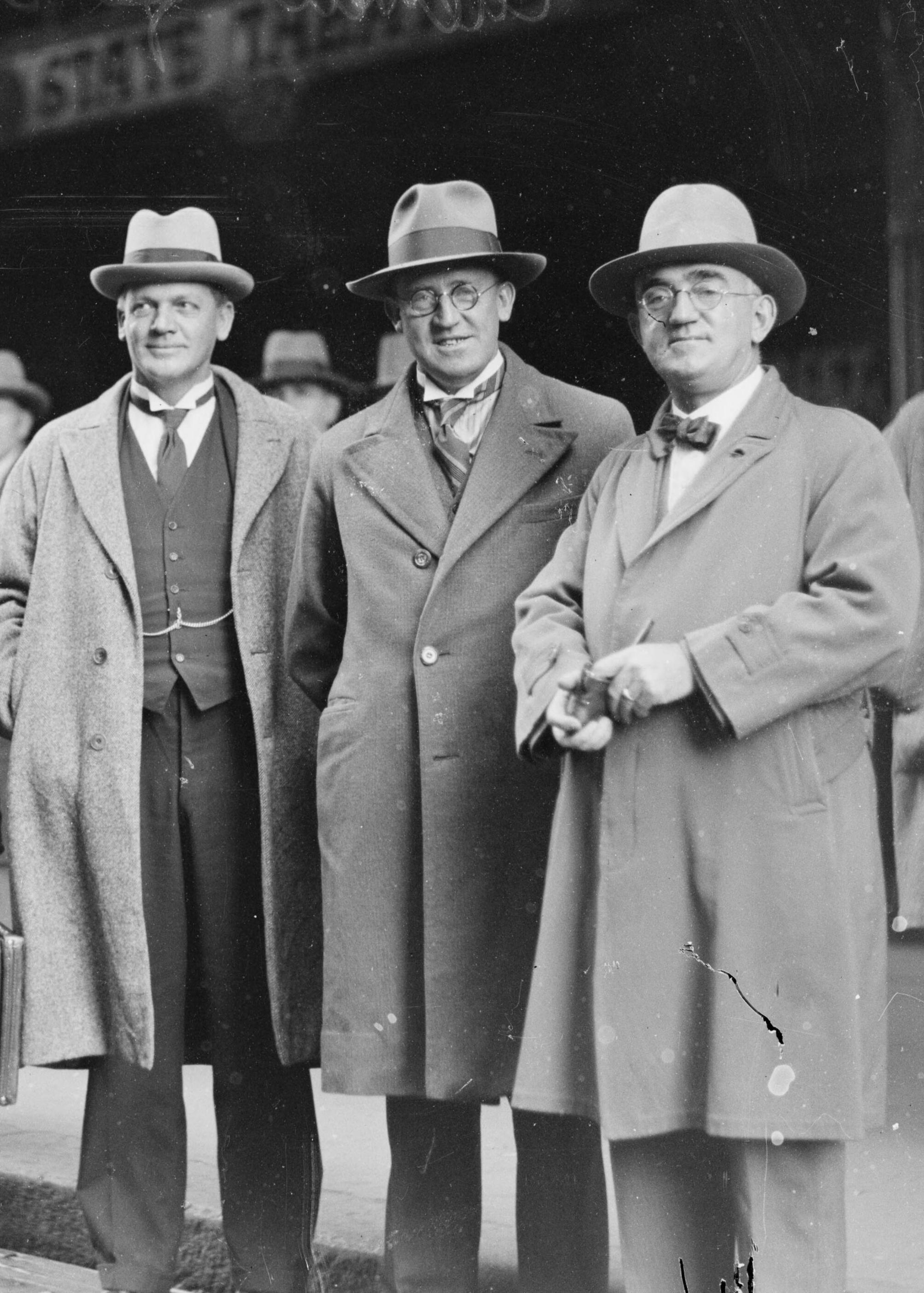
Brown (left) in 1933 with Arthur Calwell and William Forgan Smith

Brown joined the Australian Labor Party (ALP) in 1918 and was elected to the Senate at the 1931 federal election, to a term beginning on 1 July 1932.

Brown served as the ALP's deputy Senate leader from 1935 to 1938, following the 1934 election result which saw the party reduced to only three senators. He was an economic protectionist and opposed the Lyons government's adoption of Imperial Preference on the grounds that tariffs were needed on all imports to protect Australia's secondary industry. By this time his earlier militant views had moderated and he "called for thorough economic management and equity in welfare provision, rather than for more radical reforms". In the early years of World War II, Brown criticised the Department of Information as ineffective and called for greater use of propaganda by the government, which he suggested should emulate Joseph Goebbels. In 1942 he stated that the government should use its "knowledge of mass psychology and the mass mind in order to succeed" in the war.

In 1941, Brown was elected Chairman of Committees. Despite the ALP having a minority in the Senate, he tied with Walter Cooper in the ballot due to the absence of a United Australia Party senator and then had his name drawn from a hat in accordance with standing orders. Brown was elected President of the Senate on 23 September 1943, following the death in office of James Cunningham. He was re-elected unopposed in 1944, 1947 and 1950. His tenure ceased in 1951 when the Menzies government called a double dissolution and won a Senate majority. A portrait of Brown by Henry Hanke is held by the Historic Memorials Collection of Parliament House, Canberra.

Brown suffered a stroke in July 1951 while speaking against the Communist Party ban referendum bill. He collapsed at his desk and was attended by health minister Earle Page, before being taken to Canberra Community Hospital by ambulance. Brown made a full recovery and returned to the Senate in October 1951. He was re-elected to two further six-year terms, in 1953 and 1958, although his subsequent contributions to debate were limited. He retired at the end of his term on 30 June 1965, aged 80.

== Later life ==
Brown published his memoirs, My Descent from Soapbox to Senate, in 1953.

He died on Thursday 12 January 1967 at Royal Brisbane Hospital. A state funeral was held on Saturday 14 January 1967 at St Philip's Anglican Church in Annerley and then the East Chapel of Mount Thompson Crematorium. His ashes are kept in the church's columbarium.

Parliament of Australia
Preceded by James Cunningham	President of the Senate; 1943–1951	Succeeded by Ted Mattner
