= Candidates of the 1940 Australian federal election =

This article provides information on candidates who stood for the 1940 Australian federal election. The election was held on 21 September 1940.

Earlier in 1940, the Lang Labor supporters had again broken away from the federal Australian Labor Party. Seats held by the defectors are designated as Labor seats.

== By-elections, appointments and defections ==
=== By-elections and appointments ===
- On 12 July 1938, Jim Sheehan (Labor) was appointed a Victorian Senator to replace John Barnes (Labor).
- On 10 December 1938, Sydney McHugh (Labor) was elected to succeed Charles Hawker (UAP) as the member for Wakefield.
- On 20 May 1939, William Conelan (Labor) was elected to succeed Frank Baker (Labor) as the member for Griffith.
- On 27 May 1939, Lancelot Spurr (Labor) was elected to succeed Joseph Lyons (UAP) as the member for Wilmot.
- On 2 March 1940, John Dedman (Labor) was elected to succeed Richard Casey (UAP) as the member for Corio.
- On 13 August 1940, three UAP cabinet ministers, Geoffrey Street (Corangamite), James Fairbairn (Flinders) and Sir Henry Gullett (Henty), were killed in the Canberra air disaster. No by-elections were held due to the proximity of the election.

=== Defections ===
- In 1937, Country Party MP John McEwen (Indi) was expelled from the state-based party for accepting a ministry in the Lyons-Page government. In response, following the party conference in 1938, Thomas Paterson (Gippsland) led over a hundred McEwen supporters out of the state United Country Party to form the breakaway Liberal Country Party, loyal to the Page-led federal party. The Country Party's other Victorian MP, George Rankin (Bendigo), remained with the UCP.
- In 1938, Independent UAP MP Percy Spender (Warringah) joined the United Australia Party.
- In 1940, supporters of New South Wales Premier Jack Lang again broke away from the federal Labor Party, this time calling themselves the Australian Labor Party (Non-Communist). Its federal members were Senator Stan Amour (New South Wales), Senator John Armstrong (New South Wales), Jack Beasley (West Sydney), Joe Gander (Reid), Dan Mulcahy (Lang), Sol Rosevear (Dalley) and Tom Sheehan (Cook).

== Retiring Members and Senators ==
=== Labor ===
- William Maloney MP (Melbourne, Vic)

=== United Australia ===
- Senator Charles Grant (Tas)

=== Country ===
- James Hunter MP (Maranoa, Qld)

== House of Representatives ==
Sitting members at the time of the election are shown in bold text. Successful candidates are highlighted in the relevant colour. Where there is possible confusion, an asterisk (*) is also used.

=== New South Wales ===
Electorate	Held by	Labor candidate	Coalition candidate	Labor (N-C) candidate	State Labor candidate	Other candidates
Barton	United Australia	H. V. Evatt	**Albert Lane** (UAP)	John Rose	Sam Lewis	John Mackay (Ind); Robert Mackie (ADM)
Calare	Country	John Breen	Herbert Hodby (CP); **Harold Thorby** (CP)	John Heiss	Greg McGirr	Richard Brazier (Ind)
Cook	Labor	Jock Garden		**Tom Sheehan**		Cyril Glassop (Ind Lab)
Cowper	Country	Myles Kelly	**Sir Earle Page** (CP)			John Cain (Ind); Joseph McElhone (Ind)
Dalley	Labor	Donald Cochrane	Hubert O'Connell (UAP)	**Sol Rosevear**	Edmund Ryan	
Darling	Labor	**Joe Clark**		Les Murphy		Alexander Huie (Ind)
East Sydney	Labor	**Eddie Ward**	James Catts (UAP); Lewis Nott (UAP)	Steve Gould		Fred Aarons (Ind); Diana Gould (Ind); Louis Phillips (Atokist)
Eden-Monaro	United Australia	Herb Turner	Frank Louat (UAP); Roy May (UAP); Pat Osborne (UAP); **John Perkins*** (UAP)	Benjamin Kelly		George Alam (Ind); Rupert Beale (Ind)
Gwydir	Labor	**William Scully**	Ernest Batchelor (CP); Ben Wade (CP)			Frederick Deakins (Ind)
Hume	Country	Clarence Nolan	**Thomas Collins** (CP)	Arthur Fuller	John Fisher	Eric Roberts (ADM)
Hunter	Labor	**Rowley James**			Bill Gollan	
Lang	Labor	John Metcalfe	Matthew Calman (UAP); Bertram Stevens (UAP); Stanley Willmott (UAP)	**Dan Mulcahy**	Arthur Robinson	
Macquarie	United Australia	Ben Chifley	**John Lawson** (UAP)	Bernard Cunningham		
Martin	United Australia	Raymond Watt	**William McCall** (UAP)		Rupert Lockwood	
New England	Country	Leigh Cuthbertson	Joe Abbott* (CP); Donald Shand (CP); **Victor Thompson** (CP)			
Newcastle	Labor	**David Watkins**			Tom Hickey	Arthur Clarke (Ind)
North Sydney	United Australia	James Dooley	**Billy Hughes** (UAP)	John Steel	William Wilson	
Parkes	United Australia	Daniel Murphy	**Sir Charles Marr** (UAP)			David Knox (Ind)
Parramatta	United Australia	Albert Rowe	Norman Rydge (UAP); **Sir Frederick Stewart*** (UAP); Gordon Wallace (UAP)	James Dalton	Bill Wood	
Reid	Labor	Charles Morgan		**Joe Gander**	Jack Hughes	Leslie Brown (Ind UAP); Edward James (Ind)
Richmond	Country	Jim Fredericks	**Larry Anthony** (CP)		Alexander Collingridge	
Riverina	Country	Joe Langtry	**Horace Nock** (CP); Hugh Roberton (CP)	William Quirk	Charles Lenon	Ronald Cuttle (Ind); John Hogan (ADM)
Robertson	United Australia	Thomas Williams	**Sydney Gardner** (UAP); Campbell Marshall (UAP); Eric Spooner* (UAP)	Michael McKeon	James Russell	William Cox (Ind); Edward Down (Ind)
Warringah	Independent UAP	Bessie Frewin	Joseph Hamlet (UAP); **Percy Spender*** (UAP)		Arthur Warren	Patrick Esplin (ADM)
Watson	United Australia	Max Falstein	**John Jennings** (UAP)	Cecil Irwin	Richard Wilson	
Wentworth	United Australia	Norman Smith	Norman Cowper (UAP); **Eric Harrison*** (UAP); Richard Stranger (UAP)		Jim Morley	George McDonald (Ind Nat)
Werriwa	Labor	**Bert Lazzarini**	Walter Duncan (UAP); Charles Hardwick (UAP); Lyell Scott (UAP); Mont Sheppard (UAP); Joseph Worland (UAP)	Con Quilkey	Rex Connor	
West Sydney	Labor	Henry Mulcahy		**Jack Beasley**	Peter Burke	Malinda Ivey (Ind); Stan Moran (Ind)

=== Northern Territory ===
Electorate	Held by	Labor candidate	Other candidates
Northern Territory	Independent	Lindsay Craig	**Adair Blain*** (Ind); Fred Colson (Ind); John McDonald (Ind Lab)

=== Queensland ===
Electorate	Held by	Labor candidate	Coalition candidate	Other candidates
Brisbane	Labor	**George Lawson**	John Fletcher (UAP)	
Capricornia	Labor	**Frank Forde**	Edwin Hiskens (CP)	
Darling Downs	Country	Leslie Bailey	**Arthur Fadden** (CP)	
Griffith	Labor	**William Conelan**	Peter McCowan (UAP)	
Herbert	Labor	**George Martens**	Thomas Mann (CP)	Louis Haydon (Ind RSL); Fred Paterson (Ind)
Kennedy	Labor	**Bill Riordan**	Wilfrid Simmonds (CP)	
Lilley	United Australia	Gordon Lovell	**William Jolly** (UAP)	Charles Mitchell (Ind)
Maranoa	Country	Frank Baker	Bob McGeoch (CP)	Henry Madden (Ind)
Moreton	United Australia	Henry Herbert	**Josiah Francis** (UAP)	
Wide Bay	Country	Samuel Round	**Bernard Corser** (CP)	John Rex (PLP)

=== South Australia ===
Electorate	Held by	Labor candidate	Coalition candidate	Other candidates
Adelaide	United Australia	Edgar Dawes	**Fred Stacey** (UAP)	Raymond Davis (ADLP); Bert Edwards (Ind Lab)
Barker	Country	Cecil Skitch	**Archie Cameron** (CP)	Charles Lloyd (Ind)
Boothby	United Australia	George Edwin Yates	**John Price** (UAP)	William Adey (Ind)
Grey	Country	Charles Davis	**Oliver Badman** (CP)	Percy McFarlane (Ind)
Hindmarsh	Labor	**Norman Makin**	Harry Hatwell (UAP)	
Wakefield	Labor	**Sydney McHugh**	Jack Duncan-Hughes (UAP)	

=== Tasmania ===
Electorate	Held by	Labor candidate	UAP candidate	Independent candidates
Bass	Labor	**Claude Barnard**	Algie Findlay; Desmond Oldham	John Watson
Darwin	United Australia	Eric Reece	**George Bell**	
Denison	Labor	**Gerald Mahoney**	Arthur Beck	
Franklin	Labor	**Charles Frost**	Hugh Warner	
Wilmot	Labor	**Lancelot Spurr**	Frank Edwards; Allan Guy*	

=== Victoria ===
Electorate	Held by	Labor candidate	Coalition candidate	Other candidates
Balaclava	United Australia	Charles Sandford	**Thomas White** (UAP)	Harry Moffat (Ind)
Ballaarat	Labor	**Reg Pollard**	Edward Montgomery (UAP)	Alex Russell (Ind)
Batman	Labor	**Frank Brennan**	Albert Peters (UAP)	
Bendigo	Country	Bert de Grandi	**George Rankin** (UCP)	John Barton (Ind UCP)
Bourke	Labor	**Maurice Blackburn**	Charles Lucas (UAP)	
Corangamite	United Australia	Harold Miller	Allan McDonald (UAP)	
Corio	Labor	**John Dedman**	Gerald Patterson (UAP)	Harry Lyall (Ind)
Deakin	United Australia	Frank Williamson	**William Hutchinson** (UAP)	Frank Fisher (Ind); Duncan McCallum (Ind)
Fawkner	United Australia	Arthur Fraser	**Harold Holt** (UAP)	Alexander Mills (Ind)
Flinders	United Australia	Frank Lee	Rupert Ryan (UAP)	Alexander Amess (Ind); Edward Mann (Ind)
Gippsland	Country	James McKenna	George Bowden (UCP); **Thomas Paterson*** (LCP)	Calvert Wyeth (Ind)
Henty	United Australia	Arthur Haywood		Arthur Coles* (Ind); Edward Riley (Ind); Samuel Thomas (Ind); Eric Young (Ind)
Indi	Country	Jack Devlin	**John McEwen** (LCP)	
Kooyong	United Australia	Thomas Brennan	**Robert Menzies** (UAP)	Drysdale Bett (Ind); John Dale (Ind); Francis Foster (Ind); Frank Hartnett (Ind)
Maribyrnong	Labor	**Arthur Drakeford**	Robert Vroland (UAP)	
Melbourne	Labor	Arthur Calwell	Richard Griffiths (UAP)	James Baker (ADLP); Edward Whitcombe (Ind Lab)
Melbourne Ports	Labor	**Jack Holloway**	Raymond Trickey (UAP)	
Wannon	United Australia	Don McLeod	**Thomas Scholfield** (UAP)	John Crawford (Ind CP); Jabez Potts (Ind)
Wimmera	Independent	Michael Nolan	Hugh McClelland (UCP)	Robert Johnstone (Ind); **Alexander Wilson*** (Ind)
Yarra	Labor	**James Scullin**	Fred Edmunds (UAP)	Ralph Gibson (Ind)

=== Western Australia ===
Electorate	Held by	Labor candidate	Coalition candidate	Other candidates
Forrest	Country	Vane Green	**John Prowse** (CP)	
Fremantle	Labor	**John Curtin**	Frederick Lee (UAP)	Gil Clarke (Ind UAP)
Kalgoorlie	Labor	**Albert Green**		
Perth	United Australia	Gavan McMillan	**Walter Nairn** (UAP)	James Bolitho (Ind)
Swan	Country	Jim Dinan	**Henry Gregory*** (CP); Thomas Marwick (CP)	Claude Barker (Ind); John Tregenza (BIWF)

== Senate ==
Sitting Senators are shown in bold text. Tickets that elected at least one Senator are highlighted in the relevant colour. Successful candidates are identified by an asterisk (*).

=== New South Wales ===
Three seats were up for election. The United Australia Party-Country Party Coalition was defending two seats. The Labor Party was defending one seat. Labor Senators Stan Amour, John Armstrong and Tom Arthur were not up for re-election.

Labor candidates	Coalition candidates	Labor (N-C) candidates	State Labor candidates	Defence candidates	Ungrouped candidates
1. **Bill Ashley***; 2. James Arnold*; 3. William Large*	1. **Dick Dein** (UAP); 2. **Mac Abbott** (CP); 3. James Patrick (UAP)	1. Stanley Allen; 2. John Kerin; 3. James Walker	1. Edwin Barker; 2. Clarrie Campbell; 3. Albert Crowe	1. Peter Pollack; 2. William Hulks; 3. Wilbred Taylor	Adela Walsh; Stanley White; Lance Sharkey; Harry Bohland; William Adkins; John O'Carroll

=== Queensland ===
Three seats were up for election. The United Australia Party-Country Party Coalition was defending three seats. Labor Senators Gordon Brown, Joe Collings and Ben Courtice were not up for re-election.

Labor candidates	Coalition candidates	Ungrouped candidates
1. William Bertram; 2. William Collins; 3. Austin Elliott	1. **Walter Cooper*** (CP); 2. **Thomas Crawford*** (UAP); 3. **Harry Foll*** (UAP)	Jim Slater (Ind Soc)

=== South Australia ===
Three seats were up for election. The United Australia Party was defending three seats. United Australia Party Senators Philip McBride, Alexander McLachlan and Keith Wilson were not up for re-election.

Labor candidates	UAP candidates	Ungrouped candidates
1. Alex Finlay; 2. Bert Hoare; 3. Herman Dolling	1. **James McLachlan***; 2. **George McLeay***; 3. **Oliver Uppill***	Tom Garland

=== Tasmania ===
Three seats were up for election. The United Australia Party was defending three seats. Labor Senators Bill Aylett, Richard Darcey and Charles Lamp were not up for re-election.

Labor candidates	UAP candidates	Ungrouped candidates
1. John Brown; 2. Howard D'Alton; 3. Maurice Weston	1. **Herbert Hays***; 2. **John Hayes***; 3. Bayard Edgell; 4. John Millen; 5. Burford Sampson*	Donald Cameron

=== Victoria ===
Four seats were up for election. One of these was a short-term vacancy caused by Labor Senator-elect John Barnes's death; this had been filled in the interim by Labor's Jim Sheehan. The United Australia Party-Country Party Coalition was defending three seats. The Labor Party was defending one seat. Labor Senators Don Cameron and Richard Keane were not up for re-election.

Labor candidates	Coalition candidates	Ungrouped candidates
1. **Jim Sheehan**; 2. Parker Moloney; 3. Bert Hendrickson; 4. William McAdam	1. **Charles Brand*** (UAP); 2. **William Gibson*** (CP); 3. **John Leckie*** (UAP); 4. John Spicer* (UAP)	Gerry O'Day (Ind); Claude Peace (TR)

=== Western Australia ===
Three seats were up for election. The United Australia Party-Country Party Coalition was defending three seats. Labor Senators Robert Clothier, James Cunningham and James Fraser were not up for re-election.

Labor candidates	Coalition candidates	Soldiers candidates	Ungrouped candidates
1. Frank Trainer; 2. Dorothy Tangney; 3. Herb Graham	1. **Herbert Collett*** (UAP); 2. **Bertie Johnston*** (CP); 3. **Allan MacDonald*** (UAP)	1. Arthur Richards; 2. Alexander Cunningham; 3. Stanley Dival	Carlyle Ferguson (Ind); Claude Swaine (Emp. Co-op.)

== See also ==
- 1940 Australian federal election
- Members of the Australian House of Representatives, 1937–1940
- Members of the Australian House of Representatives, 1940–1943
- Members of the Australian Senate, 1941–1944
- Members of the Australian Senate, 1938–1941
- List of political parties in Australia
