= Members of the Australian Senate, 1938–1941 =

Senate composition at 1 July 1938
Government (20) - (2 seat majority)
United Australia Party (16)
Country Party (3)
Independent Country (1) (Note: Senator William Gibson had been expelled by the Country Party in September 1935. He was listed as an "Independent Country" member and continued to support the government.)

Opposition (16)
Labor (16) (Note: At the September 1940 election Labor Senator Jim Sheehan was defeated for a casual vacancy by UAP candidate John Spicer.)

Changes in composition

This is a list of members of the Australian Senate from 1938 to 1941. Half of its members were elected at the 15 September 1934 election and had terms starting on 1 July 1935 and finishing on 30 June 1941; the other half were elected at the 23 October 1937 election and had terms starting on 1 July 1938 and finishing on 30 June 1944. The process for filling casual vacancies was complex. While senators were elected for a six-year term, people appointed to a casual vacancy only held office until the earlier of the next election for the House of Representatives or the Senate.

Senator	Party	State	Term ending	Years in office
Mac Abbott	Country	New South Wales	1941	1935–1941
Stan Amour	Labor / Non-Comm. Labor (Note: In April 1940, Amour and Armstrong joined five MHRs in forming the Non-Communist Labor Party, a Lang Labor breakaway led by Jack Beasley. They rejoined the ALP in March 1941.)	New South Wales	1944	1938–1965
John Armstrong	Labor / Non-Comm. Labor	New South Wales	1944	1938–1962
Tom Arthur	Labor	New South Wales	1944	1938–1944
Bill Ashley	Labor	New South Wales	1941	1938–1962
Bill Aylett	Labor	Tasmania	1944	1938–1965
John Barnes (Note: Labor Senator John Barnes was elected at the October 1937 election to a term starting on 1 July 1938, but died on 31 January 1938; Labor member Jim Sheehan was appointed to replace him on 12 July, with his term expiring at the September 1940 election, when he was defeated by UAP candidate John Spicer to fill the remainder of the vacancy, expiring on 30 June 1944.)	Labor	Victoria	1944	1913–20, 1923–35
Charles Brand	United Australia	Victoria	1941	1935–1947
Gordon Brown	Labor	Queensland	1944	1932–1965
Don Cameron	Labor	Victoria	1944	1938–1962
Robert Clothier	Labor	Western Australia	1944	1938–1950
Herbert Collett	United Australia	Western Australia	1941	1933–1947
Joe Collings	Labor	Queensland	1944	1932–1950
Walter Cooper	Country	Queensland	1941	1928–1932, 1935–1968
Ben Courtice	Labor	Queensland	1944	1937–1962
Thomas Crawford (Note: Father of the Senate)	United Australia	Queensland	1941	1917–1947
James Cunningham	Labor	Western Australia	1944	1937–1943
Richard Darcey	Labor	Tasmania	1944	1938–1944
Dick Dein	United Australia	New South Wales	1941	1935–1941
Harry Foll	United Australia	Queensland	1941	1917–1947
James Fraser	Labor	Western Australia	1944	1938–1959
William Gibson	Independent / Country (Note: Gibson was expelled from the Country Party on 23 September 1935 for disloyalty. He continued to support the government as an independent, but was not re-admitted to the party until 21 November 1939.)	Victoria	1941	1935–1947
Charles Grant	United Australia	Tasmania	1941	1925, 1932–1941
John Hayes	United Australia	Tasmania	1941	1923–1947
Herbert Hays	United Australia	Tasmania	1941	1923–1947
Bertie Johnston	Country	Western Australia	1941	1929–1942
Richard Keane	Labor	Victoria	1944	1938–1946
Charles Lamp	Labor	Tasmania	1944	1938–1950
John Leckie	United Australia	Victoria	1941	1935–1947
Allan MacDonald	United Australia	Western Australia	1941	1935–1947
Philip McBride	United Australia	South Australia	1944	1937–1944
Alexander McLachlan	United Australia	South Australia	1944	1926–1944
James McLachlan	United Australia	South Australia	1941	1935–1947
George McLeay	United Australia	South Australia	1941	1935–1947, 1950–1955
Jim Sheehan	Labor	Victoria	1940 (Note: Appointed to a casual vacancy and only held office until the earlier of the next election for the House of Representatives or the Senate.)	1938–1940, 1944–1962
John Spicer	United Australia	Victoria	1944	1940–1944, 1950–1956
Oliver Uppill	United Australia	South Australia	1941	1935–1944
Keith Wilson	United Australia	South Australia	1944	1938–1944
