= Leader of the Government in the Senate =

Leader of the Government in the Senate may refer to:

- Leader of the Government in the Senate (Australia)
- Representative of the Government in the Senate (Canada), known before 2015 as the "Leader of the Government in the Senate"
