= James Patrick (shipowner) =

Capt. James Ronald Patrick (1880 – 8 May 1945) was an Australian shipowner, born in Bothwell, Scotland; founder and governing director of James Patrick & Co Pty Ltd and the Patrick Line of cargo ships.

== Early life ==
Patrick began his successful career by working his way to America at the age of 13. He worked for two years in a sailing ship, deserted in Hong Kong and joined an American sailer in Japan.

In 1913 he was master of the Currie Line steamer Gracchus.

At the outbreak of World War I he joined the Royal Navy and in 1917 he was promoted to lieutenant commander. he took over command of the sloop HMS Torch, the last sailing vessel in the Royal Navy. According to his Senate promotional advertisement (which also had him running away to sea at the age of 12) he was promoted to commander in 1920.

== Patrick Shipping ==
In 1919 he founded Patrick Steamship Co Limited with the purchase of the ship Timaru, the SS Skylark and the three-masted schooner Abemama; these vessels were ideally suited for shipping timber. A major financial backer was a "(Tasmanian) north-west coast produce firm".

Patrick Steamships Limited worked the coastal trade between the major east coast cities at rates below those of the Interstate Ship Owners Federation, who retaliated by matching his charges and restricting his access to coal fuel. The company went into liquidation in 1924.

James Patrick and Company was founded 1924 with the Mawatta. He gave his other ships Scots names, including the Carlisle, Cardross and Carsdale. The company worked outside the Commonwealth Steamship Owners Association which had agreed freight rates, and charged the same rates as the old Patrick Steamships. The association again retaliated by reducing its rates on those routes covered by Jas. Patrick and Co.

== Other interests ==
He was a member of the Commonwealth Shipping Control Board and the Maritime Industrial Commission. He was chairman of directors of Anderson and Co. of Sydney, Nixon Smith Shipping and Wool Dumping Co., and the Circular Quay Stevedoring Co. of Brisbane. He was also a director of the Mercantile Mutual.

He was for many years President of the NSW Highland Society, a member of Legacy and the Graziers Association. He ran a cattle property at Moss Vale. He ran (unsuccessfully) for a New South Wales Senate seat in 1940.

He was an avid and successful big game hunter and photographer.

== Family ==
He married Margaret Reed (died 16 January 1946) and had a home "Craigend" at Darling Point in Sydney.

They had two sons: (James Alexander) Ronald Patrick (born 21 March 1905) of Killara and Kenneth Joseph Patrick (born 4 October 1907) of Mosman.
