= John Daly (Australian politician) =

Australian lawyer and politician

The Honourable John Daly
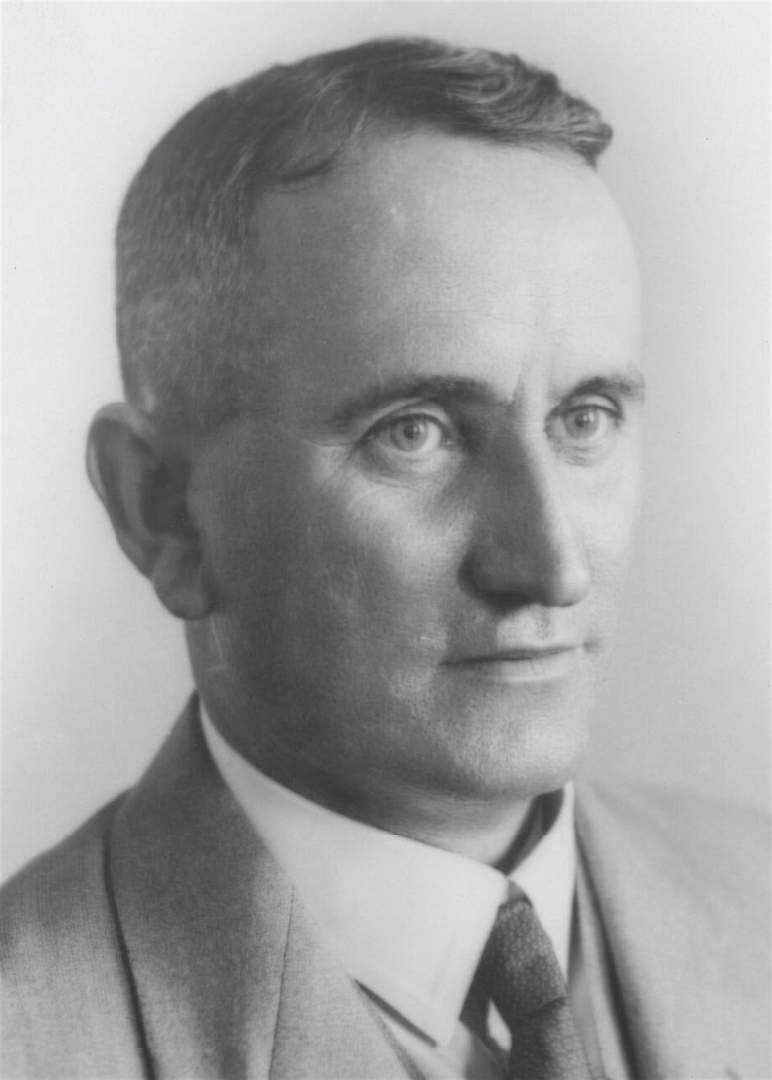

Minister for Defence
- In office 4 February 1931 – 3 March 1931
- Preceded by: Albert Green
- Succeeded by: Ben Chifley

Leader of the Government in the Senate
- In office 22 October 1929 – 3 March 1931
- Preceded by: George Pearce
- Succeeded by: John Barnes

Leader of the Opposition in the Senate
- In office 25 June 1929 – 22 October 1929
- Preceded by: Ted Needham
- Succeeded by: George Pearce

Senator for South Australia
- In office 17 November 1928 – 30 June 1935

Personal details
- Born: 10 November 1891 Thebarton, South Australia
- Died: 13 April 1942 (aged 50) North Adelaide, South Australia
- Party: Labor (1928–34); Independent (1934–35)
- Profession: Barrister

John Joseph Daly (10 November 1891 – 13 April 1942) was an Australian lawyer and politician who served as a Senator for South Australia from 1928 to 1935. He was a member of the Australian Labor Party until 1934, when he was expelled. During the Scullin government he was the party's Senate leader, and held ministerial office as Vice-President of the Executive Council and briefly as Minister for Defence.

== Early life ==
Daly was born at Hemington, now part of the Adelaide suburb of Thebarton, and educated at St John the Baptist School, Thebarton, but left at 13. He continued his education at Remington Training College and became an office-boy in the legal firm of Sir Josiah Symon and later conveyancing clerk for William Joseph Denny and Francis Villeneuve Smith. He was called to the bar in 1919 and handled much trade union work. He married Eva Bird in October 1918.

== Political career ==
Daly joined the Australian Workers' Union in 1914 and was a member of the executive of the South Australian branch of the Australian Labor Party from 1918 to 1928. He ran unsuccessfully for the South Australian Legislative Council in 1921 and for the Australian Senate in 1925. He was elected to the Senate in 1928 and was the following June unanimously elected as the ALP's Senate leader, becoming Leader of the Opposition in the Senate.

With the election of the Scullin government in 1929, Daly became Senate leader and Vice-President of the Executive Council and minister in charge of development and migration, and of the Council for Scientific and Industrial Research in the Scullin Ministry. From August 1930 to January 1931, he acted as Attorney-General and allegedly had H. V. Evatt and Edward McTiernan appointed to the High Court of Australia against Scullin's wishes. He opposed the Scullin government's deflationary Niemeyer Plan and was removed from cabinet by caucus in March 1931, but following a change in his attitude to support the similar Premiers' Plan was restored to cabinet in June 1931 as minister without portfolio. He was expelled from the party by the South Australian branch for supporting Scullin's economic policies and failed to gain preselection for the Senate for the 1934 election.

== Later life ==
Following the expiration of his Senate term, Daly returned to his private practice. He died in North Adelaide survived by his wife and his five children.

== Notes ==
Political offices
Preceded by George Pearce	Vice-President of the Executive Council; 1929–1931	Succeeded by John Barnes
Preceded by Albert Green	Minister for Defence; 1931	Succeeded by Ben Chifley
Party political offices
Preceded by Ted Needham	Leader of the Australian Labor Party in the Senate; 1929–1931	Succeeded by John Barnes
