= Neil O'Sullivan =

Australian politician

The Honourable Sir Neil O'Sullivan KBE
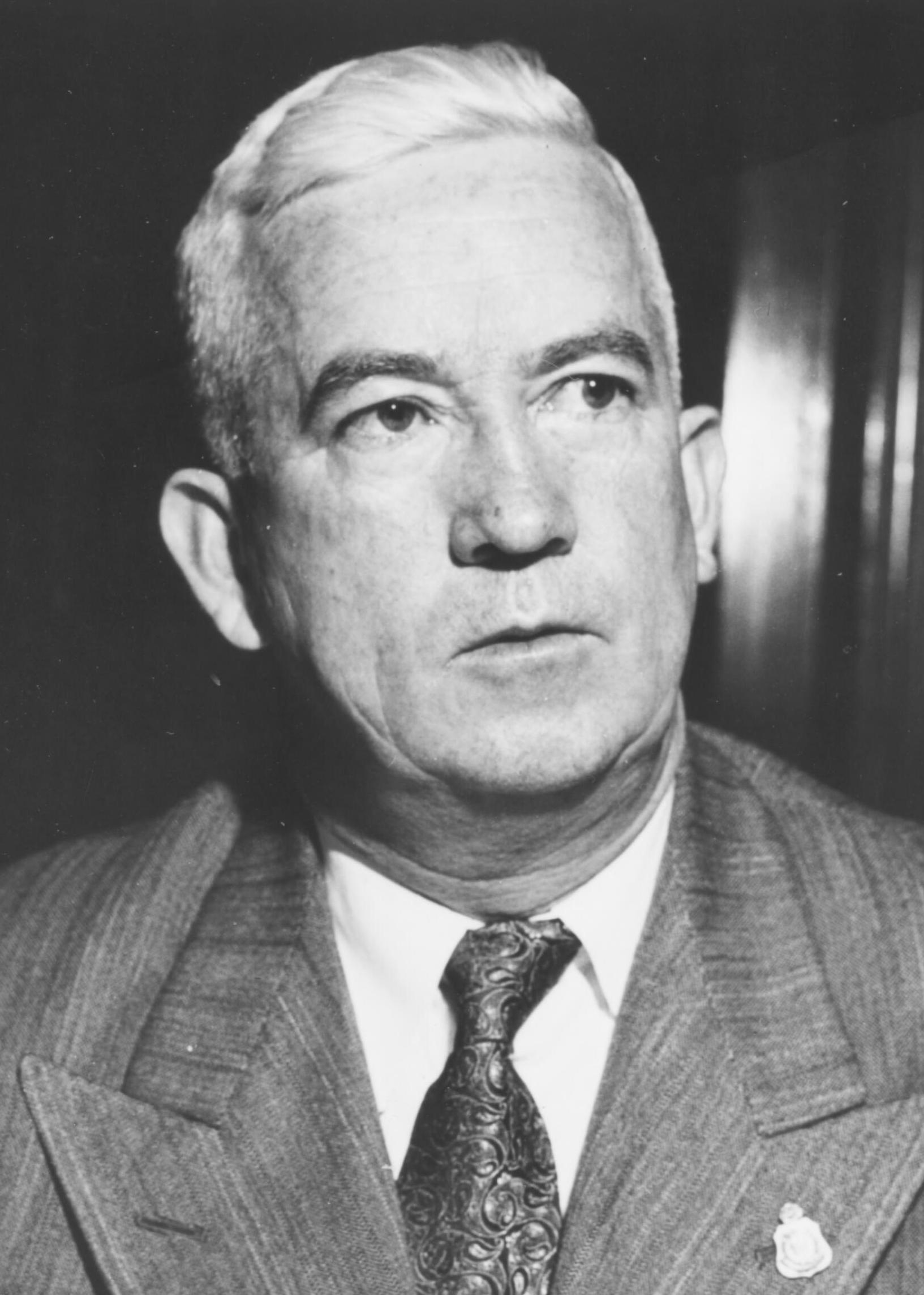

Attorney-General of Australia
- In office 15 August 1956 – 12 October 1958
- Prime Minister: Robert Menzies
- Preceded by: John Spicer
- Succeeded by: Garfield Barwick

Leader of the Government in the Senate
- In office 21 February 1950 – 8 December 1958
- Leader: Robert Menzies
- Preceded by: Bill Ashley
- Succeeded by: Bill Spooner

Minister for the Navy
- In office 11 January 1956 – 24 October 1956
- Prime Minister: Robert Menzies
- Preceded by: Eric Harrison
- Succeeded by: Charles Davidson

Minister for Trade and Customs
- In office 19 December 1949 – 11 January 1956
- Prime Minister: Robert Menzies
- Preceded by: Ben Courtice
- Succeeded by: John McEwen

Senator for Queensland
- In office 1 July 1947 – 30 June 1962

Personal details
- Born: 2 August 1900 Toowong, Queensland, Australia
- Died: 4 July 1968 (aged 67) Sydney, Australia
- Party: UAP (to 1945); Liberal (from 1945)
- Spouse: Jessie McEncroe (m. 1929)
- Relations: Patrick O'Sullivan (grandfather); Thomas O'Sullivan (uncle); Neil MacGroarty (uncle)
- Occupation: Solicitor

Sir Michael Neil O'Sullivan KBE (2 August 1900 – 4 July 1968) was an Australian politician and lawyer. He served as a Senator for Queensland from 1947 to 1962, representing the Liberal Party. He held senior ministerial positions in the post-war Menzies Government, serving as Minister for Trade and Customs (1949–56), Minister for the Navy (1956), and Attorney-General (1956–58).

== Early life ==
O'Sullivan was born on 2 August 1900 in Toowong, Queensland. He was the fifth child born to Patrick Alban O'Sullivan and his wife Mary Bridget (née Macgroarty), both of Irish Catholic descent. His uncles Thomas O'Sullivan and Neil MacGroarty served in the Queensland Legislative Assembly, as did his paternal grandfather Patrick O'Sullivan.

O'Sullivan attended the state school in Taringa before completing his education at St. Joseph's Nudgee College. He followed his father into the legal profession, serving articles of clerkship with firms in Brisbane and Warwick. He did not attend law school but was admitted as a solicitor in December 1922 by examination. He subsequently took over his father's practice in Brisbane, later forming a partnership with John Joseph Rowell.

Regarded as "a leader of Brisbane's mercantile sector", O'Sullivan was president of the Brisbane Chamber of Commerce from 1936 to 1937 and the Property Owners' Protection Association from 1937 to 1938. He served in the Royal Australian Air Force from May 1942 to December 1944, performing intelligence and administration in Australia and the South-West Pacific. He was commissioned as a flying officer and met future prime minister John Gorton while stationed at Milne Bay.

== Political career ==
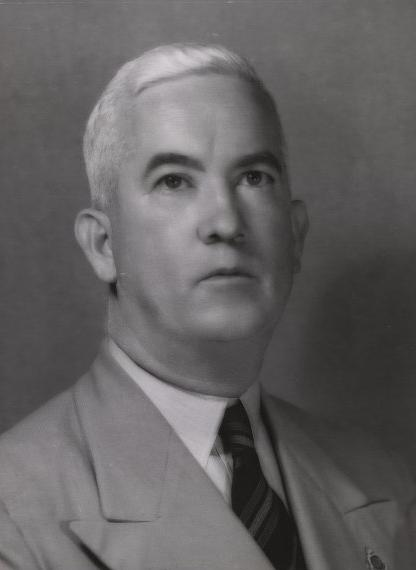
O'Sullivan c. 1947

O'Sullivan ran unsuccessfully for the United Australia Party (UAP) in the Division of Brisbane at the 1934 federal election. He was also an unsuccessful candidate for the Queensland UAP in the seat of Windsor at the 1941 state election.

At the 1946 federal election, O'Sullivan won a seat in the Senate for the Liberal Party of Australia as one of only three non-Labor members in the Senate. Following the 1949 election, he became leader of the government in the Senate and he was appointed Minister for Trade and Customs in the Menzies government. He was appointed Minister for the Navy in January 1956. In August 1956, he was appointed Attorney-General following the resignation of John Spicer and in October 1956, he was appointed Vice-President of the Executive Council following the resignation of Eric Harrison, but he retired from the ministry in 1958. He did not stand for re-election at the 1961 election. After leaving politics he became a director of LJ Hooker.

=== Views ===
In his maiden speech to parliament, O'Sullivan spoke of his belief in the doctrine of natural rights deriving from God. He was a social conservative, supporting heavy censorship as a safeguard against "indecency, blasphemy and sedition". Although he voted for the Matrimonial Causes Act 1959, which established uniform national divorce laws, he believed that divorce violated the divine law and stated that "a valid consummated Christian marriage is indissoluble". He was an anti-communist and cited the papal encyclical Quadragesimo anno in a 1947 speech against the Chifley government's bank nationalisation bill.

== Personal life ==
O'Sullivan married Jessie McEncroe on 3 April 1929, with whom he had two sons. He was a devout Catholic and was a close connection of Archbishop James Duhig, with his biographer Duncan Waterson stating that "on matters of faith, morals, censorship and conservative Catholic social thought the two were as one". O'Sullivan was made Knight Commander of the Order of the British Empire in 1959.

O'Sullivan died unexpectedly of a coronary occlusion while visiting Sydney in 1968. He was survived by his wife and two sons. He was accorded a state funeral and was buried in Nudgee Cemetery.

== Notes ==
Political offices
Preceded by Ben Courtice	Minister for Trade and Customs; 1949–56	Succeeded by John McEwen
Preceded by Eric Harrison	Minister for the Navy; 1956	Succeeded by Charles Davidson
Preceded by John Spicer	Attorney-General; 1956–58	Succeeded by Garfield Barwick
Preceded by Eric Harrison	Vice-President of the Executive Council; 1956–58	Succeeded by Bill Spooner
Party political offices
Vacant Title last held by George McLeay	Leader of the Liberal Party in the Senate; 1949–58	Succeeded by Bill Spooner
