= Patrick Corporation =

Australian transport company

- Industry: Logistics
- Founded: 1919
- Founder: James Patrick
- Headquarters: Melbourne, Australia
- Area served: Australia
- Parent: Brookfield Asset Management (50%); Qube Holdings (50%)
- Website: www.patrick.com.au

Patrick Corporation is an Australian seaport operator with operations in Brisbane, Fremantle, Melbourne and Sydney. Formerly listed on the Australian Securities Exchange, it is owned by Brookfield Asset Management and Qube Holdings.

== History ==
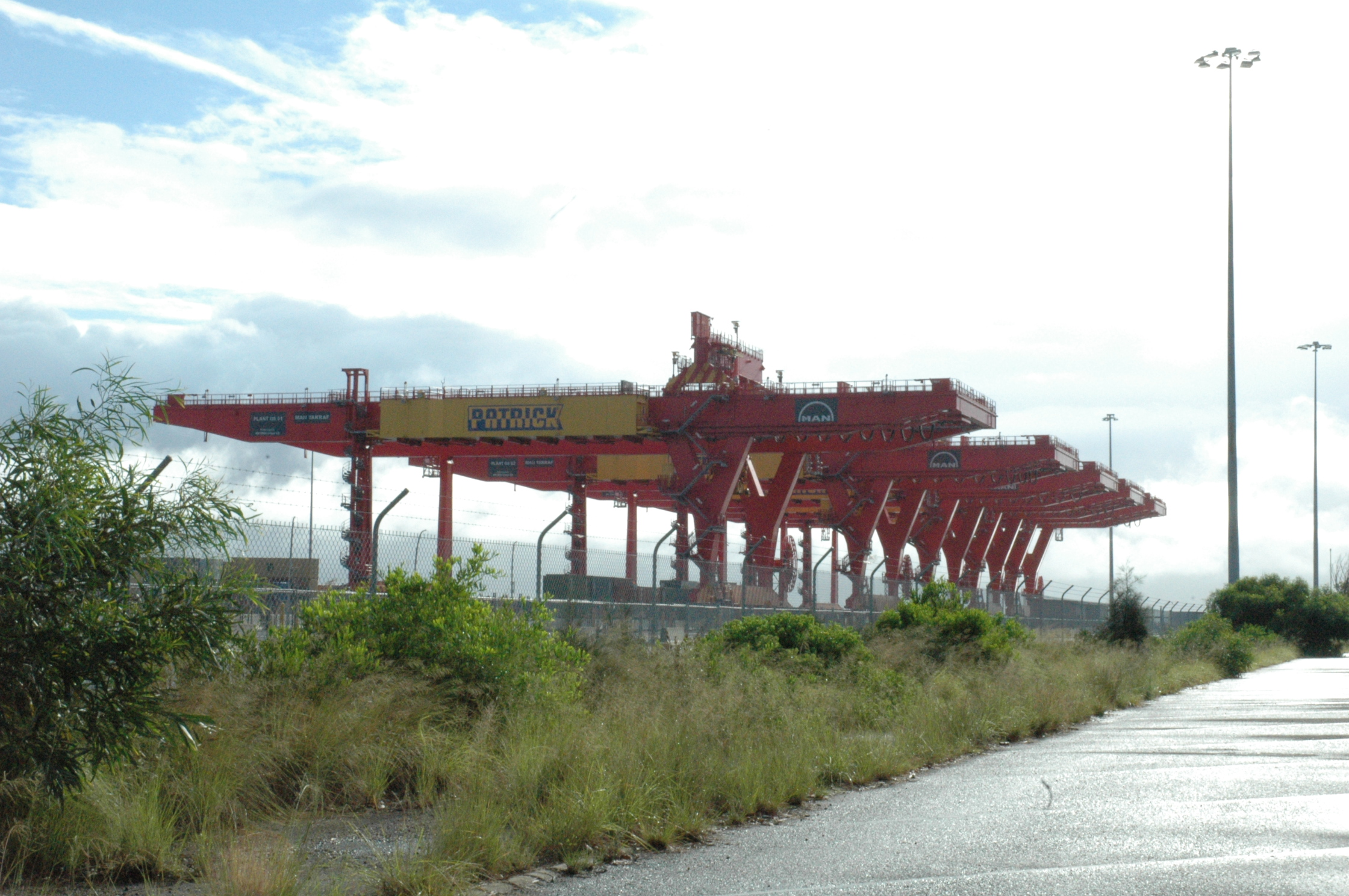
Patrick Corporation container crane at Port Botany

Patrick Steamship Co was founded in 1919 by James Patrick. It operated a shipping service with the SS Timaru out of Sydney along the East Coast of Australia. By 1925 it was operating as both a shipping line and stevedore, gradually expanding interstate. The shipping operations were sold to Howard Smith.

In 1988, Patrick entered a joint venture with Australian National Line to operate all of their ports with Patrick owning 40%.

Patrick was one of the main parties in the 1998 Australian waterfront dispute. In Patrick Stevedores Operations No 2 Pty Ltd v Maritime Union of Australia, Patrick was found to have illegally dismissed its workforce. After a corporate restructure, in April 1998, the company fired its entire workforce on the docks in Australia, and replaced them with a non-unionised workforce that had been trained in Dubai, resulting in controversy and picketing.

In 2000 Patrick Corporation took over Holyman. In November 2000, Patrick purchased the post operations of Mayne Nickless. In February 2002, in partnership with Toll Holdings, it acquired a 50% shareholding in Pacific National that purchased FreightCorp and the National Rail Corporation. In March 2002, Patrick acquired a 50% stake in Virgin Blue. It took control of the airline in March 2005, ultimately having a 63% shareholding.

In August 2005, Toll Holdings launched a hostile takeover bid for Patrick Corporation. In January 2006, the Australian Competition & Consumer Commission (ACCC) announced it would not allow that Toll to takeover Patrick Corporation. However, in March 2006, after the ACCC announced it would allow the takeover after Toll gave further undertakings including disposing of its 50% shareholding in Pacific National.

In April 2006, Patrick Corporation agreed to accept Toll's revised bid for the company after spending nine months fighting the hostile takeover. Having gained a 90% shareholding in May 2006, Toll was able to compulsorily purchase the remaining shares and delist the company from the Australian Securities Exchange.

To fulfil an undertaking given to the ACCC to divest itself of Patrick's Bass Strait and Tasmanian operations, this part of the business was sold to SeaRoad in March 2007.

In June 2007, Patrick Corporation and Pacific National were spun-off from Toll Holdings as Asciano. As part of the break up of Asciano, a consortium of Brookfield Asset Management and Qube Holdings purchased Patrick in August 2016. The Bulk and Automotive Port Services business was sold separately as the Linx Cargo Care Group.
