= Leader of the Government in the Senate (Australia) =

Australian cabinet position

- Commonwealth Coat of Arms

- Flag of Australia

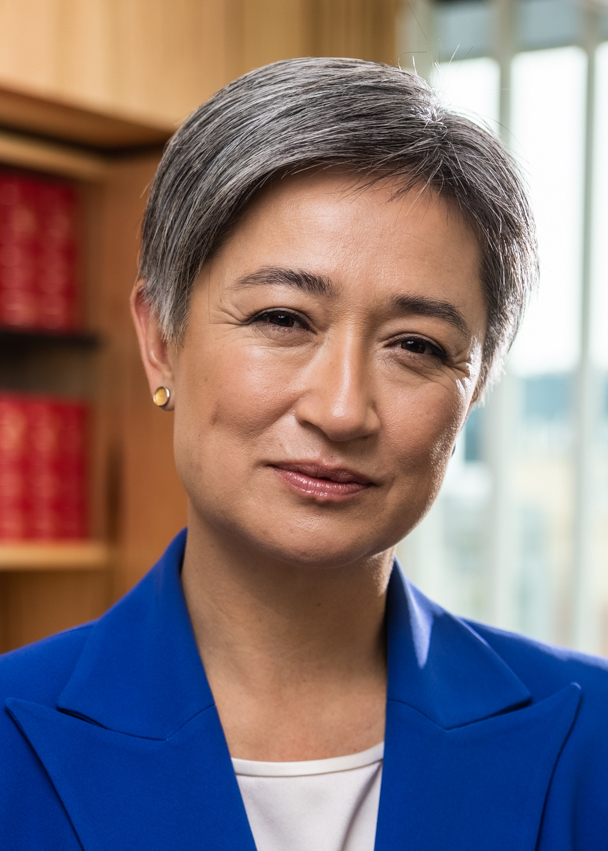
- Incumbent; Penny Wong since 23 May 2022
- Australian Government; Australian Senate
- Style: The Honourable
- Inaugural holder: Richard O'Connor

The Leader of the Government in the Senate (historically also known as the Leader of the Senate) is the government's most senior cabinet minister in the Australian Senate and the main government spokesperson in the Senate. The position's Opposition counterpart is the Leader of the Opposition in the Senate.

The current Leader of the Government in the Senate is Penny Wong, elected unanimously to the position on 23 May 2022, replacing Simon Birmingham. The current Deputy Leader of the Government in the Senate is Don Farrell.

== Role and history ==
According to constitutional convention, the government is formed in the House of Representatives and the Prime Minister is a member of that chamber and the Prime Minister is the leader of the Government in the House of Representatives. The Leader of the Government in the Senate has duties and privileges that parallel those of the Prime Minister, in that they have overarching responsibility for all policy areas and acts as the government's principal spokesperson in the upper house. They are also entitled to sit at the table of the Senate, and has priority in gaining recognition from the President of the Senate during debate. Another similarity is that the leader typically announces changes to government officeholders in the Senate, including ministers, leadership and whips. The leader also has some responsibility for appointing government senators to committees, a role filled in the House of Representatives by the Leader of the House.

The position of Leader of the Government in the Senate does not have a constitutional basis, but has existed since the first parliament in 1901 through longstanding parliamentary convention. Although it has similarities to the Senate Majority Leader in the United States and the Leader of the House of Lords in the United Kingdom, it was not based on either of those, but rather on the position of Leader of the Government in the Legislative Council found in Australia's colonial parliaments. Because government is formed in the House rather than the Senate, there is no guarantee that the Leader of the Government will be drawn from the largest party in the Senate. Unlike the Prime Minister, there is no requirement for the Leader of the Government to command the confidence of the chamber. It is not a cabinet post in its own right, and the holder of the office has always held at least one ministerial portfolio (though sometimes only the mostly honorific Vice-Presidency of the Executive Council).

The longest-serving Leader of the Government in the Senate was George Pearce, who held the position for a cumulative total of 15 years in three separate terms between 1914 and 1937. Uniquely, from 10 January to 1 February 1968, the positions of Prime Minister and Leader of the Government in the Senate were held by the same person, John Gorton. After the disappearance of Harold Holt, Gorton – a senator – was elected leader of the Liberal Party and thus ascended to the prime ministership. In line with constitutional convention, he resigned from the Senate to contest a by-election to the House of Representatives.

== List of Leaders of the Government in the Senate ==
Leader	Term began	Term ended	Portfolio	Party	Prime Minister	Term in office	Deputy
Richard O'Connor	9 May 1901	24 September 1903	V-P Exec. Council	Protectionist	Barton	2 years, 96 days	James Drake
Tom Playford	24 September 1903	27 April 1904	V-P Exec. Council	Protectionist	Deakin	216 days	James Drake
Gregor McGregor	27 April 1904	18 August 1904	V-P Exec. Council	Labor	Watson	113 days	Anderson Dawson
Josiah Symon	18 August 1904	5 July 1905	Attorney-General	Free Trade	Reid	321 days	James Drake
Tom Playford	5 July 1905	31 December 1906 (Note: Playford lost his seat at the federal election on 12 December. The year 1906 was the last in which terms ended in on the last day of December rather than June.)	Defence	Protectionist	Deakin	1 year, 179 days	John Keating
Robert Best	20 February 1907	13 November 1908	V-P Exec. Council	Protectionist	Deakin	1 year, 267 days	John Keating
Gregor McGregor	13 November 1908	2 June 1909	V-P Exec. Council	Labor	Fisher	201 days	George Pearce
Edward Millen	2 June 1909	29 April 1910	V-P Exec. Council	Commonwealth; Liberal	Deakin	331 days	Robert Best
Gregor McGregor	29 April 1910	24 June 1913	V-P Exec. Council	Labor	Fisher	3 years, 56 days	George Pearce
Edward Millen	24 June 1913	17 September 1914	Defence	Commonwealth; Liberal	Cook	1 year, 85 days	James McColl
George Pearce	17 September 1914	17 February 1917	Defence	Labor	Fisher	2 years, 153 days	Albert Gardiner
George Pearce	17 September 1914	17 February 1917	Defence	Labor	Hughes	2 years, 153 days	Albert Gardiner
George Pearce	17 September 1914	17 February 1917	Defence	National Labor	Hughes	2 years, 153 days	Patrick Lynch
Edward Millen	17 February 1917	9 February 1923	V-P Exec. Council; Repatriation (from Sep 1917)	Nationalist	Hughes	5 years, 357 days	George Pearce
George Pearce	9 February 1923	19 October 1929	Home and Territories (to 1926); V-P Exec. Council (from 1926)	Nationalist	Bruce	6 years, 252 days	Victor Wilson
John Daly	22 October 1929	3 March 1931	V-P Exec. Council; Defence (Feb–Mar 1931)	Labor	Scullin	1 year, 132 days	
John Barnes	3 March 1931	6 January 1932	V-P Exec. Council	Labor	Scullin	309 days	
George Pearce	6 January 1932	29 November 1937	Defence (to 1934); Home Affairs (from 1934); Territories (from 1934)	United; Australia	Lyons	5 years, 327 days	
Alexander McLachlan	29 November 1937	7 November 1938	Postmaster-General	United; Australia	Lyons	343 days	
George McLeay	8 November 1938	7 October 1941	V-P Exec. Council (to 1939); Commerce (1939 – Mar 1940); Trade and Customs (Mar–Oct 1940); Postmaster-General (Oct 1940–41); Repatriation (Oct 1940–41); V-P Exec. Council (from 1941); Supply and Development (from Jun 1941)	United; Australia	Lyons	2 years, 333 days	
George McLeay	8 November 1938	7 October 1941	V-P Exec. Council (to 1939); Commerce (1939 – Mar 1940); Trade and Customs (Mar–Oct 1940); Postmaster-General (Oct 1940–41); Repatriation (Oct 1940–41); V-P Exec. Council (from 1941); Supply and Development (from Jun 1941)	United; Australia	Page	2 years, 333 days	
George McLeay	8 November 1938	7 October 1941	V-P Exec. Council (to 1939); Commerce (1939 – Mar 1940); Trade and Customs (Mar–Oct 1940); Postmaster-General (Oct 1940–41); Repatriation (Oct 1940–41); V-P Exec. Council (from 1941); Supply and Development (from Jun 1941)	United; Australia	Menzies	2 years, 333 days	
George McLeay	8 November 1938	7 October 1941	V-P Exec. Council (to 1939); Commerce (1939 – Mar 1940); Trade and Customs (Mar–Oct 1940); Postmaster-General (Oct 1940–41); Repatriation (Oct 1940–41); V-P Exec. Council (from 1941); Supply and Development (from Jun 1941)	United; Australia	Fadden	2 years, 333 days	
Joe Collings	7 October 1941	20 September 1943	Interior	Labor	Curtin	1 year, 348 days	
Richard Keane	20 September 1943	26 April 1946	Trade and Customs	Labor	Curtin	2 years, 218 days	
Richard Keane	20 September 1943	26 April 1946	Trade and Customs	Labor	Forde	2 years, 218 days	
Richard Keane	20 September 1943	26 April 1946	Trade and Customs	Labor	Chifley	2 years, 218 days	
Bill Ashley	17 June 1946	19 December 1949	Supply and Shipping; Shipping and Fuel	Labor	Chifley	3 years, 185 days	
Neil O'Sullivan	21 February 1950	8 December 1958	Trade and Customs (to Jan 1956); the Navy (Jan–Oct 1956); Attorney-General (from Aug 1956); V-P Exec. Council (from Oct 1956)	Liberal	Menzies	8 years, 290 days	
Bill Spooner	8 December 1958	2 June 1964	V-P Exec. Council; National Development	Liberal	Menzies	5 years, 178 days	Shane Paltridge
Shane Paltridge	10 June 1964	19 January 1966	Defence	Liberal	Menzies	1 year, 230 days	Denham Henty
Denham Henty	26 January 1966	16 October 1967	Supply	Liberal	Holt	1 year, 263 days	John Gorton
John Gorton	16 October 1967	1 February 1968	Education and Science; Prime Minister (from 10 Jan. 1968)	Liberal	Holt	108 days	Denham Henty
John Gorton	16 October 1967	1 February 1968	Education and Science; Prime Minister (from 10 Jan. 1968)	Liberal	McEwen	108 days	Denham Henty
John Gorton	16 October 1967	1 February 1968	Education and Science; Prime Minister (from 10 Jan. 1968)	Liberal	Himself	108 days	Denham Henty
Ken Anderson	28 February 1968 (Note: Anderson was appointed Leader of the Government before the second session of the 26th Parliament, and Gorton made his appointments on 28 February 1968.)	5 December 1972	Supply (to 1971); Health	Liberal	Gorton	4 years, 281 days	Denham Henty
Ken Anderson	28 February 1968	5 December 1972	Supply (to 1971); Health	Liberal	Gorton	4 years, 281 days	Annabelle Rankin
Ken Anderson	28 February 1968	5 December 1972	Supply (to 1971); Health	Liberal	McMahon	4 years, 281 days	Annabelle Rankin
Ken Anderson	28 February 1968	5 December 1972	Supply (to 1971); Health	Liberal	McMahon	4 years, 281 days	Reg Wright
Lionel Murphy	19 December 1972	9 February 1975	Attorney-General; Custom and Excise	Labor	Whitlam	2 years, 52 days	
Ken Wriedt	10 February 1975	11 November 1975	Agriculture (to Oct 1975); Minerals and Energy (from Oct 1975)	Labor	Whitlam	274 days	
Reg Withers	12 November 1975	7 August 1978	V-P Exec. Council (Note: Withers was appointed Vice-President of the Executive Council the day after the Dismissal as part of Fraser's Caretaker Cabinet, but he continued in that office for his entire tenure as Leader of the Government. On the same date, he was appointed caretaker the Capital Territory, Special Minister of State, Minister for the Media, and Tourism and Recreation. He served in those offices until 22 December, when Fraser's first full Cabinet was sworn in. The Senate did not meet during the period 12 November to 22 December 1975 (indeed it was dissolved for most of that time). Withers gained the Administrative Services portfolio as part of 22 December reshuffle.); Administrative Services	Liberal	Fraser	2 years, 268 days	
John Carrick	7 August 1978	11 March 1983	V-P Exec. Council (to 1982); Education (to 1979); National Development (from 1979)	Liberal	Fraser	4 years, 216 days	
John Button	11 March 1983	24 March 1993	Industry, Technology and Commerce (Note: Minister for Industry and Commerce 1983–1984.)	Labor	Hawke	10 years, 13 days	
John Button	11 March 1983	24 March 1993	Industry, Technology and Commerce	Labor	Keating	10 years, 13 days	
Gareth Evans	24 March 1993	6 February 1996 (Note: Resigned to contest (successfully) the lower house seat of Holt.)	Foreign Affairs	Labor	Keating	2 years, 319 days	
Robert Hill	11 March 1996	20 January 2006	Environment and Heritage (to 2001) (Note: Minister for Environment 1996–98.); Defence	Liberal	Howard	9 years, 315 days	Nick Minchin
Nick Minchin	27 January 2006	3 December 2007	V-P Exec. Council; Finance and Administration	Liberal	Howard	1 year, 310 days	Helen Coonan
Chris Evans	12 December 2007	4 February 2013	Immigration and Citizenship (to 2010); Tertiary Education, Skills, Jobs and Workplace Relations (from 2010) (Note: Tertiary Education, Skills, Science and Research 2011–13.)	Labor	Rudd	5 years, 54 days	Stephen Conroy
Chris Evans	12 December 2007	4 February 2013	Immigration and Citizenship (to 2010); Tertiary Education, Skills, Jobs and Workplace Relations (from 2010)	Labor	Gillard	5 years, 54 days	Stephen Conroy
Stephen Conroy	4 February 2013	26 June 2013	Broadband, Communications and the Digital Economy	Labor	Gillard	142 days	Penny Wong
Penny Wong	26 June 2013	18 September 2013	Finance and Deregulation	Labor	Rudd	84 days	Jacinta Collins
Eric Abetz	18 September 2013	21 September 2015	Employment	Liberal	Abbott	2 years, 2 days	George Brandis
George Brandis	21 September 2015	20 December 2017	Attorney-General; V-P Exec. Council	Liberal	Turnbull	2 years, 90 days	Mathias Cormann
Mathias Cormann	20 December 2017	30 October 2020	Finance and the Public Service; V-P Exec. Council	Liberal	Turnbull	2 years, 315 days	Mitch Fifield; Simon Birmingham
Mathias Cormann	20 December 2017	30 October 2020	Finance and the Public Service; V-P Exec. Council	Liberal	Morrison	2 years, 315 days	Mitch Fifield; Simon Birmingham
Simon Birmingham	30 October 2020	23 May 2022	Finance; Trade, Tourism and Investment (to Dec 2020); V-P Exec. Council	Liberal	Morrison	1 year, 205 days	Michaelia Cash
Penny Wong	1 June 2022	Incumbent	Foreign Affairs	Labor	Albanese	4 years, 98 days	Don Farrell

== See also ==
- Leader of the Opposition in the Senate (Australia)
- Manager of Government Business in the Senate
