= Jim Sheehan =

Australian politician

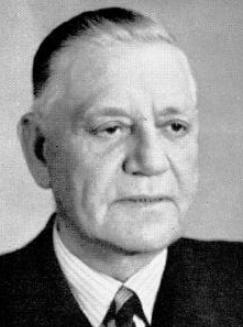

Senator for Victoria
- In office 12 July 1938 – 20 September 1940
- Preceded by: John Barnes (died between election and beginning of term)
- Succeeded by: John Spicer
- In office 1 July 1944 – 30 June 1962

Personal details
- Born: 24 July 1885 Castlemaine, Victoria
- Died: 10 April 1967 (aged 81) Castlemaine, Victoria
- Party: Australian Labor Party
- Occupation: Railway worker, unionist

James Michael Sheehan (24 July 1885 – 10 April 1967) was an Australian trade unionist and politician.

Born in Castlemaine, Victoria, he received a primary education before becoming a railway worker. He was an organiser with the Australian Workers' Union and President of the Victorian Trades Hall Council, as well as being an active member of the Victorian Labor Party. On 12 July 1938, he was appointed to the Australian Senate for Victoria to fill a casual vacancy caused by the death of Labor Senator John Barnes. The Australian Constitution dictated that an appointment to a casual vacancy was required to be re-contested at the next election and while Sheehan was number one on the Labor ticket, he was defeated in 1940 with the UAP-Country coalition winning all four seats. He was third on Labor's ticket at the 1943 election, with Labor winning all three seats, taking his place at the in 1944. He remained in the Senate until his retirement in 1961, taking effect in 1962.

Sheehan died on April 10, 1967, at the age of 81.
