= Walter Cooper (Queensland politician) =

Australian politician (1888–1973)

The Honourable Sir Walter Cooper MBE
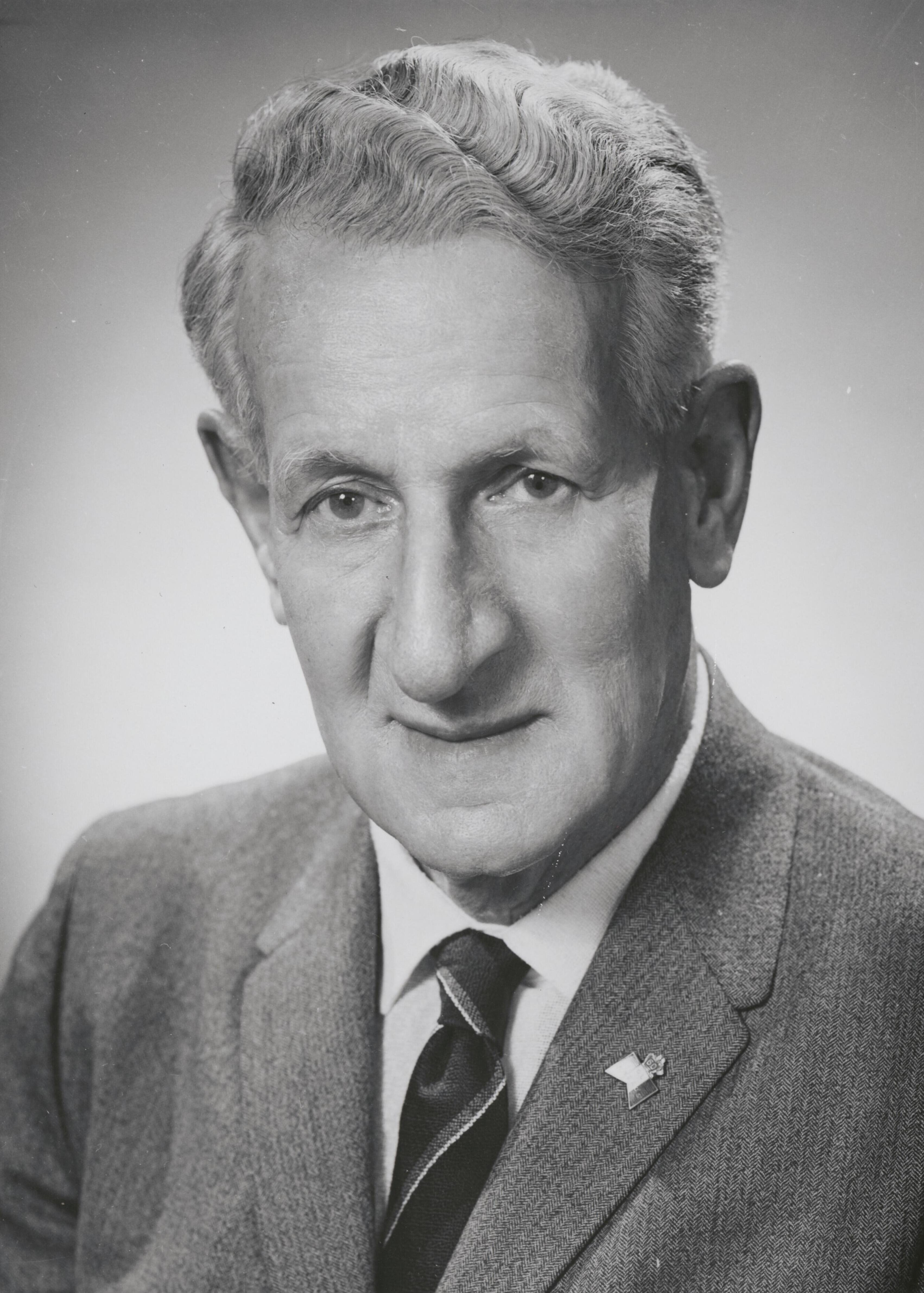

Minister for Repatriation
- In office 19 December 1949 – 29 December 1960
- Prime Minister: Robert Menzies
- Preceded by: Claude Barnard
- Succeeded by: Frederick Osborne

Leader of the Opposition in the Senate
- In office 1 June 1947 – 19 December 1949
- Preceded by: George McLeay
- Succeeded by: Bill Ashley

Senator for Queensland
- In office 1 July 1935 – 30 June 1968
- Preceded by: Matthew Reid
- Succeeded by: Ron Maunsell
- In office 17 November 1928 – 30 June 1932
- Preceded by: John MacDonald
- Succeeded by: Joe Collings

Personal details
- Born: 23 April 1888 Cheetham, Manchester, England
- Died: 22 July 1973 (aged 85) Greenslopes, Queensland, Australia
- Party: Country
- Spouse: Dorothy Crick (m. 1918)

Sir Walter Jackson Cooper, MBE (23 April 1888 – 22 July 1973) was an Australian politician who served as a Senator for Queensland for over 36 years. He served in the Senate from 1928 to 1932 and 1935 to 1968, representing the Country Party. He was also Minister for Repatriation in the Menzies government from 1949 to 1960.

== Early life ==
Cooper was born on 23 April 1888 in Cheetham, Lancashire, England. He was the son of Sarah (née Jackson) and Joseph Pollitt Cooper; his father was a travelling salesman.

Cooper was educated in England at Bedford School and Wyggeston Grammar School for Boys. He was a reservist in the Leicestershire Yeomanry and the Royal Horse Artillery, before migrating to Australia in 1910. He initially landed in Western Australia and worked his way to Queensland, finding work as an indent agent in Brisbane. In 1913, he was awarded a certificate of merit by the Royal Humane Society of Australasia for his role in rescuing swimmers from dangerous surf at Southport in December 1912.

In 1914, via the land ballot system, Cooper purchased a grazing property of 28,000 acres (11,000 ha) in remote Central West Queensland, adjoining Llanrheidol Station in the locality of Middleton. Naming the property Brackenburgh, he expanded his holdings via the acquisition of neighbouring properties and continued to raise sheep until 1950.

== Military career ==
Cooper enlisted in the Australian Imperial Force (AIF) in June 1915. He was commissioned as a second lieutenant and assigned to the 15th Battalion, serving in Gallipoli and Egypt. He was promoted lieutenant in March 1916 and captain in April 1916. After transferring to France in June 1916, Cooper was badly wounded in the right leg at the Battle of Mouquet Farm on 10 August 1916. An official historian of the 15th Battalion concluded that the injury was due to an instance of friendly fire. Cooper was moved to England where his condition deteriorated, and his leg was amputated at the 3rd London General Hospital in Wandsworth a month later.

After a period recuperating in England, Cooper was transferred to the Australian Flying Corps as an adjutant in October 1917. He was appointed acting adjutant of No. 6 Squadron in January 1918 and returned to France in September 1918 with No. 4 Squadron as recording officer. He was appointed Member of the Order of the British Empire (MBE) in 1919. Cooper served with the Army of Occupation in Germany from November 1918 to February 1919. He subsequently took an eight-month course in textile industries at the University of Leeds as part of the AIF's repatriation program, before returning to Australia in 1920. He was officially demobilised from the AIF in March 1921.

Cooper resumed his farming at Brackenburgh after the war's end, making adjustments for the loss of his leg. He joined the Legacy Club in Brisbane and the Returned Sailors' and Soldiers' Imperial League of Australia (RSL).

== Political career ==
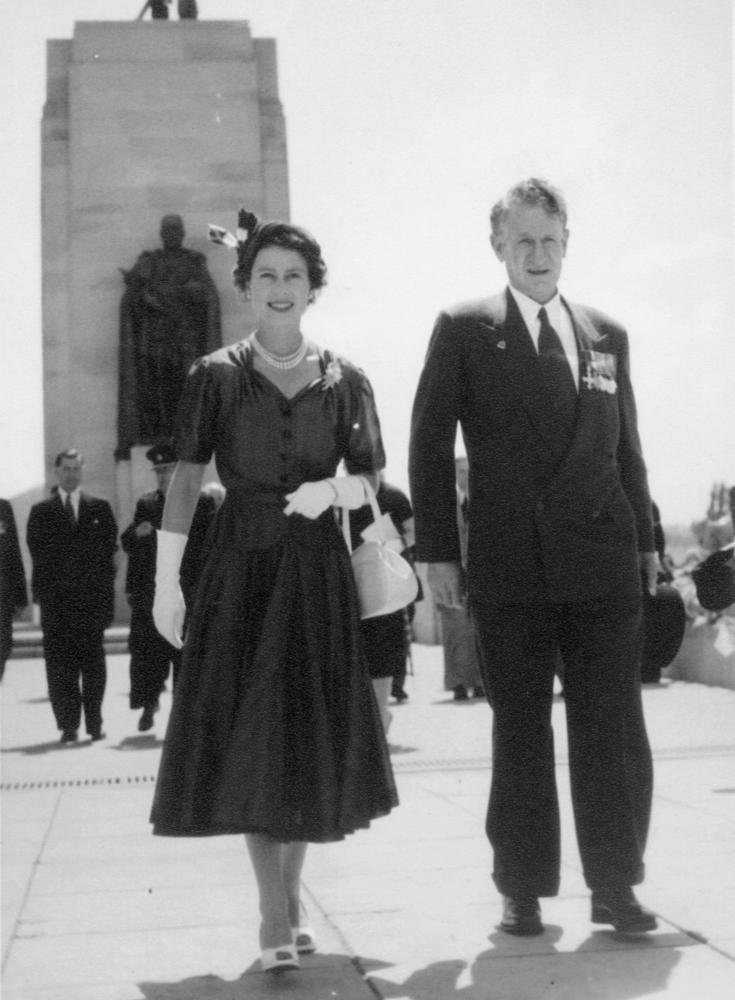
Cooper with Queen Elizabeth II in 1954

Cooper joined the Country and Progressive National Party in 1927 and the following year won preselection for the joint Country Party/Nationalist Party Senate ticket at the 1928 federal election. He was elected in place of Australian Labor Party (ALP) senator John MacDonald, who had filled the casual vacancy caused by the death of Thomas Givens. Cooper was defeated for re-election at the 1931 election. His term consequently ended on 30 June 1932, when Givens' original term would have expired.

Cooper was re-elected to the Senate at the 1934 election, to a six-year term commencing on 1 July 1935. He proved to be an "active backbencher", speaking frequently on agricultural matters and the interests of rural residents and returned soldiers. Cooper was also active on Senate committees, including as a long-standing member of the Joint Standing Committee on Public Works and the Joint Standing Committee on Social Security. In 1941 he tied with ALP senator Gordon Brown in a vote for the position of Chairman of Committees, with Brown elected by drawing lots. In March 1944, he resigned from the social security committee in protest at the actions of Speaker of the House of Representatives Sol Rosevear, which he regarded as undue interference in the committee's activities. He returned to the committee a few months later after a compromise was reached.

From 1947 to 1949, Cooper was leader of the Opposition in the Senate. Following the election of the Menzies government at the 1949 election, he led the Country Party in the Senate. In 1949, he was appointed Minister for Repatriation and held that position until he resigned from the ministry in 1960. In this position he worked closely with the RSL. He was knighted in 1959 and retired from parliament in June 1968. From 1965 until his retirement, Cooper was the Father of the Senate. He served in the Senate for a total of 36 years, 227 days, making him the longest-serving member of parliament from Queensland, the second-longest-serving senator after George Pearce, and the second-longest-serving Country MP after Earle Page.

== Personal life ==
In 1918, Cooper married Dorothy Crick, the daughter of an English farmer; they had no children. He died at Repatriation General Hospital in the Brisbane suburb of Greenslopes on 22 July 1973, survived by his wife.

In 1931, Cooper received severe injuries to his face and left arm in a motor vehicle accident when he crashed his car into a stationary truck in the Brisbane suburb of Cannon Hill.

== Notes ==
Political offices
Preceded by Claude Barnard	Minister for Repatriation; 1949–1960	Succeeded by Frederick Osborne
