= Bill Ashley (politician) =

Australian politician (1881–1958)

The Honourable Bill Ashley
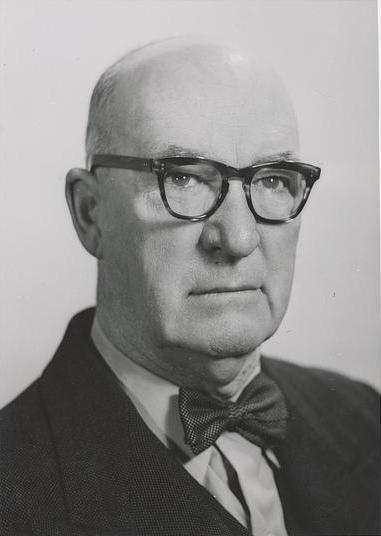

Leader of the Opposition in the Senate
- In office 19 December 1949 – 11 June 1951
- Preceded by: Walter Cooper
- Succeeded by: Nick McKenna

Leader of the Government in the Senate
- In office 17 June 1946 – 19 December 1949
- Preceded by: Richard Keane
- Succeeded by: Neil O'Sullivan

Senator for New South Wales
- In office 23 October 1937 – 27 June 1958
- Preceded by: Guy Arkins
- Succeeded by: James Ormonde

Personal details
- Born: 20 September 1881 near Hay, New South Wales, Australia
- Died: 27 June 1958 (aged 76) Sydney, New South Wales, Australia
- Party: Labor
- Spouse: Theresa Maloney (m. 1921)
- Occupation: Tobacconist

William Patrick Ashley (20 September 1881 – 27 June 1958) was an Australian politician. He was a Senator for New South Wales from 1937 until his death in 1958, representing the Australian Labor Party (ALP). He was a cabinet minister in the ALP governments between 1941 and 1949, serving as Postmaster-General (1941–1945), Minister for Information (1941–1943), Supply and Shipping (1945–1948), and Shipping and Fuel (1948–1950). He was the party's Senate leader from 1946 to 1951.

== Early life ==
Ashley was born on 20 September 1881 at Singorumba Station near Hay, New South Wales. He was the son of Julia Ann (née O'Connell) and James Ashley; his father worked as a station overseer. His mother was born in Ireland.

Ashley attended primary school in Hay. After leaving school he worked as a shop assistant in Hay and at a hotel in Booligal. He and his younger brother Tom enlisted in the Australian Commonwealth Horse in 1902 as troopers in the 5th Battalion. Their regiment arrived in South Africa after the conclusion of the Boer War and they returned to Australia a few months later. Ashley subsequently moved to Sydney and found work on the Sydney Tramways. He was an official in the Tramways Union.

Ashley eventually settled in Lithgow where he established a tobacconist shop. He also had a hairdressing saloon and kept a billiard room. He was elected to the Lithgow Municipal Council in 1911 and served two terms as mayor (in 1929 and 1935).

== Political career ==
Ashley was a friend and ally of future prime minister Ben Chifley. He served as Chifley's campaign manager in the seat of Macquarie at the 1925 federal election.

Ashley was pre-selected for the ALP's Senate ticket in New South Wales at the 1937 election, partly because his surname would appear high on the ballot paper under the alphabetical system then in effect. With the fall of the Fadden government, he became Postmaster-General and Minister for Information in the Curtin government. In March 1943, he lost the portfolio of information, but gained the position of Vice-President of the Executive Council. In February 1945, he became Minister for Supply and Shipping.

In a minor reshuffle in April 1948, Ashley became Minister for Shipping and Fuel, responsible for the Department of Shipping and Fuel. In June 1949, his handling of a scheme to introduce long-service leave for coal miners contributed to a major ensuing strike. He had implied that the federal government would contribute financially to the scheme, but this proved not to be the case. In addition, the proposed scheme might have limited the right to strike. He also attempted to support British economic recovery by buying oil from British companies—when they ran short of supplies, he was forced to impose petrol rationing. Both the coal miners' strike and the fuel rationing contributed to Labor's defeat at the 1949 election. He stayed in the Senate for the rest of his life and supported H. V. Evatt against the Industrial Groups.

== Personal life ==
Ashley married Theresa Maloney in 1921, with whom he had one daughter. After his election to the Senate he and his family moved to Coogee in Sydney's eastern suburbs. According to journalist Don Whitington, as a member of parliament he "developed few of the objectionable mannerisms that stud the path of many men of all parties to the privileges of Ministerial office [...] he continued to live in a small flat at a Sydney seaside suburb, to wear shabby double breasted blue suits with tan shoes, and horse racing continued to be his only spare time interest".

Ashley died in Sydney Hospital on 27 June 1958, survived by his wife and daughter. He had suffered a stroke earlier in the month, while being driven to an appointment for his arthritis treatment. He was accorded a state funeral. Ashley died intestate.

== Notes ==
Political offices
Preceded by Thomas Collins	Postmaster-General; 1941–1945	Succeeded by Don Cameron
Preceded by Richard Keane	Vice-President of the Executive Council; 1943–1945	Succeeded by Jack Beasley
Preceded by Jack Beasley	Minister for Supply and Shipping; 1945–1948	Succeeded by John Armstrong as Minister for Supply and Development
Preceded by Jack Beasley	Minister for Shipping and Fuel; 1948–1949	Succeeded by George McLeay
Party political offices
Preceded by Richard Keane	Leader of the Australian Labor Party in the Senate; 1946–1951	Succeeded by Nick McKenna
