= Richard Keane =

Australian politician

The Honourable Richard Keane
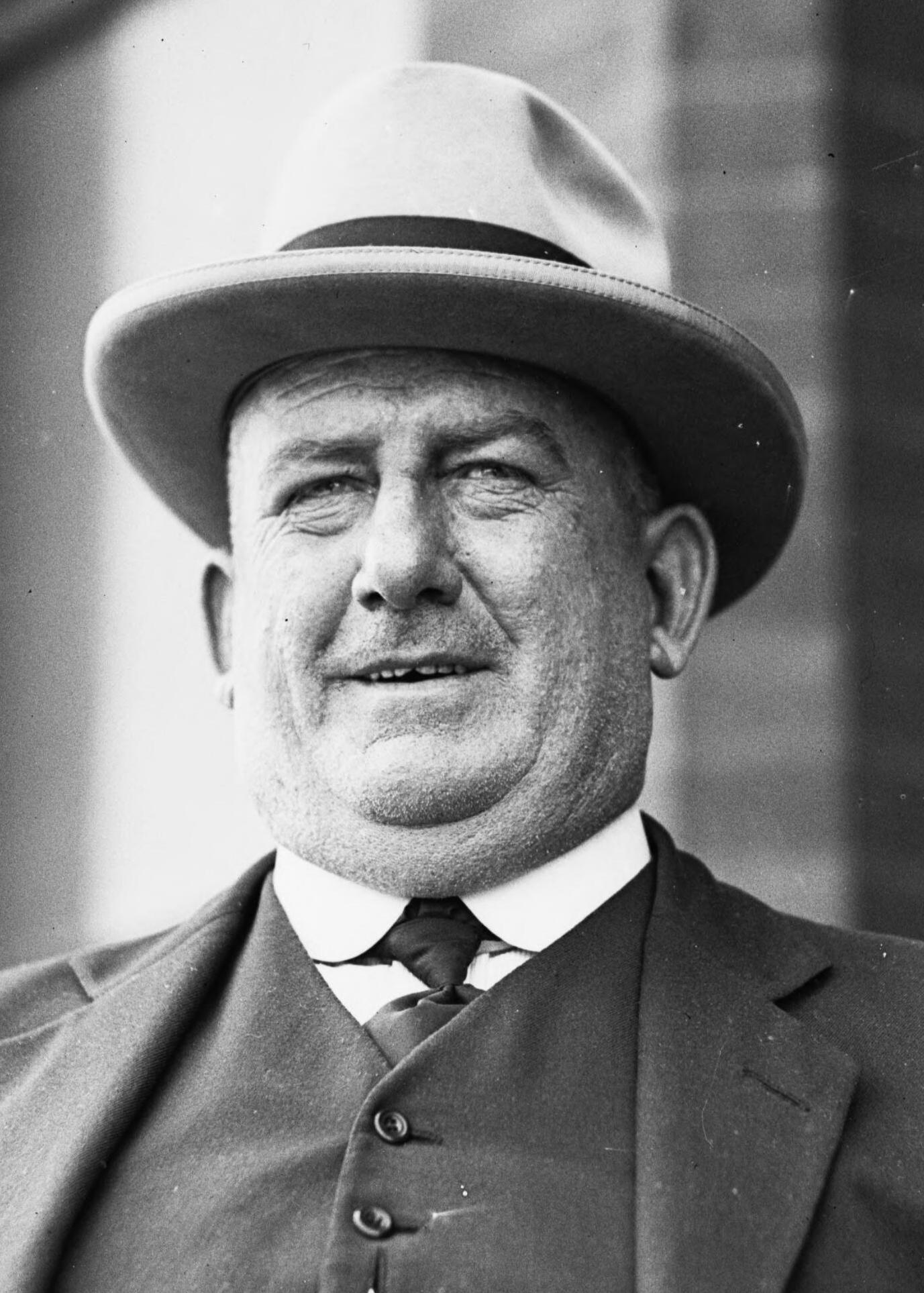

Minister for Trade and Customs
- In office 7 October 1941 – 26 April 1946
- Prime Minister: John Curtin; Frank Forde; Ben Chifley
- Preceded by: Eric Harrison
- Succeeded by: John Dedman

Leader of the Government in the Senate
- In office 20 September 1943 – 26 April 1946
- Preceded by: Joe Collings
- Succeeded by: Bill Ashley

Senator for Victoria
- In office 1 July 1938 – 26 April 1946
- Succeeded by: Alexander Fraser

Member of the Australian Parliament for Bendigo
- In office 12 October 1929 – 19 December 1931
- Preceded by: Geoffry Hurry
- Succeeded by: Eric Harrison

Personal details
- Born: 14 February 1881 Beechworth, Victoria, Australia
- Died: 26 April 1946 (aged 65) Washington, D.C., United States
- Party: Labor
- Spouses: Ruby Thorne (m. 1909; died 1923) Millicent Dunn (m. 1940)
- Occupation: Railway clerk

Richard Valentine Keane (14 February 1881 – 26 April 1946) was an Australian politician and trade unionist. He was a member of the Australian Labor Party (ALP) and served as Minister for Trade and Customs from 1941 until his death in 1946. He was a member of both the House of Representatives (1929–1931) and the Senate (1938–1946). Prior to entering politics he worked as a clerk with the Victorian Railways and served as national secretary of the Australian Railways Union (1925–1929).

== Early life ==
Keane was born on 14 February 1881 in Beechworth, Victoria, the fourth child of Hanorah (née O'Sullivan) and Timothy Keane. His parents were Irish Catholic immigrants – his mother was born in County Tipperary and his father, a police constable, in County Kerry. He possessed papers showing that his father had served with the Union in the American Civil War under the name "Timothy Kane", and had received a commendation for his role in the Battle of Sailor's Creek.

Keane was educated at Christian Brothers College, St Kilda, following his father's transfer to Melbourne. He later became the first president of the school's Old Boys association. In 1897, aged 16, Keane began working as a clerk with the Victorian Railways in Bendigo. He soon became involved in the labour movement.

== Union career ==
In 1918, Keane became an officeholder in the Victorian Railways Union. In 1925 he resigned from the public service to take up a paid position as state secretary and national secretary of the Australian Railways Union (ARU). At the time the ARU was the largest union in Victoria, with over 20,000 members. Keane supported industrial unionism and unsuccessfully advocated for the ARU to merge with the Australian Workers' Union (AWU). He was vice-president of the Commonwealth Council of Federated Unions and later served on the general arbitration committee of the Australian Council of Trade Unions (ACTU).

== Political career ==
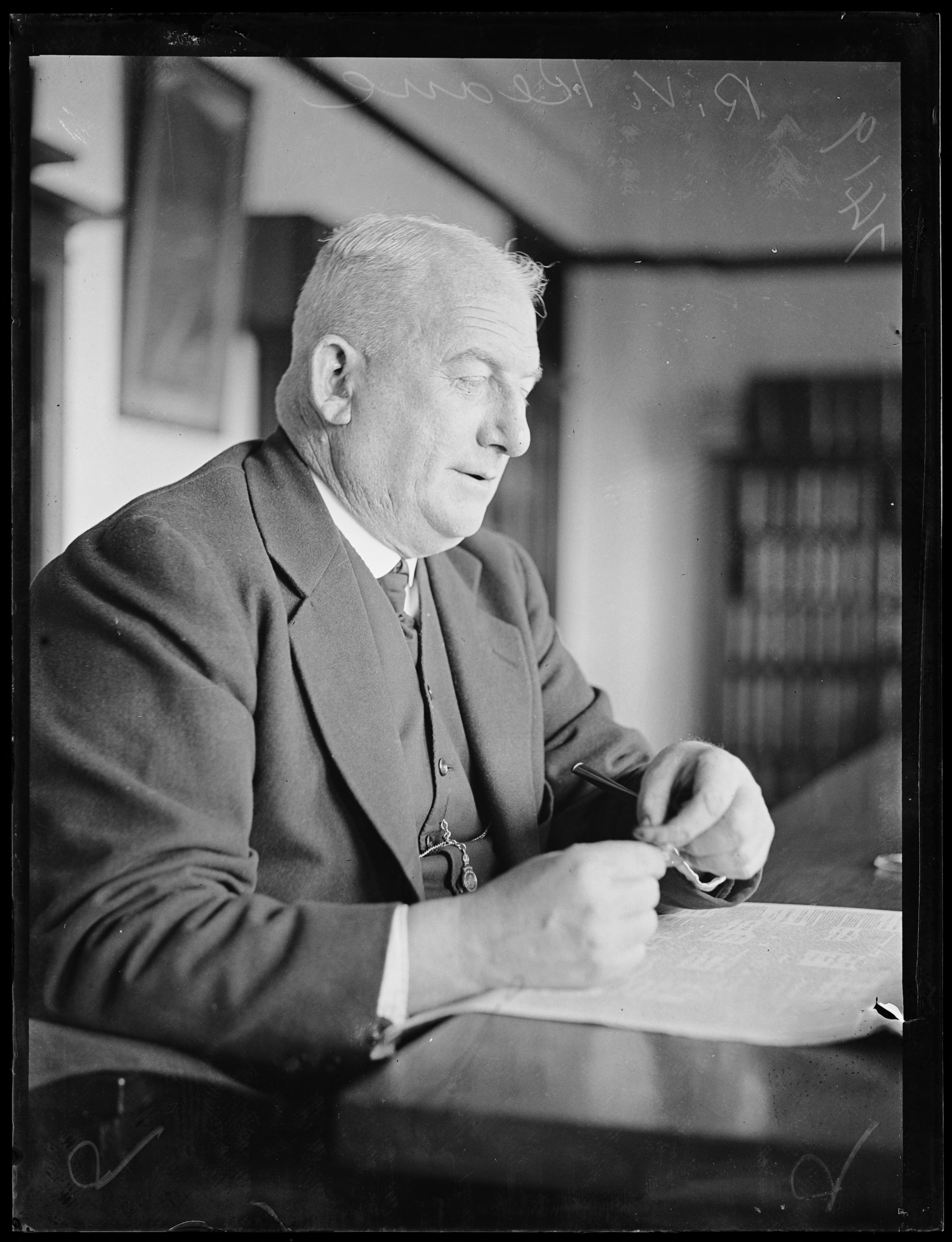
Keane at his desk in 1931

Keane was vice-president of the executive of the Victorian branch of the Australian Labor Party in 1928 and its president in 1930 and from 1937 to 1938. In 1925, he stood unsuccessfully for the Australian Senate and the Victorian Legislative Council. In the October 1929 election, he was elected as the member for Bendigo in the Australian House of Representatives, but lost it at the October 1931 election. He was narrowly defeated for Bendigo at the 1934 election, but was elected to the Senate at the 1937 election. He became leader of the government in the Senate in 1943.

In October 1941 Keane was appointed Minister for Trade and Customs and Vice-President of the Executive Council in the first Curtin Ministry and was responsible for administering wartime rationing and price controls. In 1946 he travelled to the United States to terminate Australia's Lend-Lease arrangements. While leaving the Waldorf Astoria in New York in March 1946, Keane was "wildly cheered" by "hundreds of celebrity-conscious New Yorkers" who mistook him for Winston Churchill, who was also staying at the hotel. He subsequently quipped that "I somehow wish I had been smoking a cigar".

Keane died at a hospital in Washington, D.C., on 26 April 1946, aged 65. He had collapsed earlier in the day at the Australian embassy due to heart trouble, which was attributed to over-work. He had taken over the administration of the embassy while awaiting the arrival of the new ambassador, Norman Makin.

== Personal life ==
In 1909, Keane married Ruby Thorne, a milliner, with whom he had two daughters and a son. He was widowed in 1923 and remarried in 1940 to Millicent Dunn, a typist, with whom he had another daughter, Virginia.

Keane stood 6 feet (180 cm) tall and reportedly weighed 127 kilograms (280 lb).

== Notes ==
Parliament of Australia
Preceded by Geoffry Hurry	Member for Bendigo; 1929–1931	Succeeded by Eric Harrison
Political offices
Preceded by Eric Harrison	Minister for Trade and Customs; 1941 – 1946	Succeeded by John Dedman
Preceded by George McLeay	Vice-President of the Executive Council; 1941 – 1943	Succeeded by Bill Ashley
Party political offices
Preceded by Joe Collings	Leader of the Australian Labor Party in the Senate; 1943–1946	Succeeded by Bill Ashley
