= John Spicer (Australian politician) =

Australian politician

The Honourable Sir John Spicer
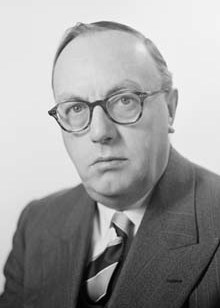

Attorney-General of Australia
- In office 19 December 1949 – 14 August 1956
- Prime Minister: Robert Menzies
- Preceded by: H. V. Evatt
- Succeeded by: Neil O'Sullivan

Senator for Victoria
- In office 29 September 1940 – 30 June 1944
- Preceded by: Jim Sheehan
- In office 22 February 1950 – 13 August 1956
- Succeeded by: George Hannan

Personal details
- Born: 5 March 1899 Prahran, Victoria, Australia
- Died: 3 January 1978 (aged 78) Armadale, Victoria, Australia
- Party: UAP (to 1945); Liberal (from 1945)
- Spouse: Lavinia Webster (m. 1924)
- Education: University of Melbourne
- Occupation: Lawyer

Sir John Armstrong Spicer (5 March 1899 – 3 January 1978) was an Australian lawyer, politician, and judge. He served two terms as a Senator for Victoria, representing the United Australia Party (UAP) from 1940 to 1944 and the Liberal Party from 1950 to 1956. Spicer was Attorney-General in the Menzies Government from 1949 to 1956. He left politics to become chief judge of the newly created Commonwealth Industrial Court, a position which he held until 1976.

== Early life ==
Spicer was born in the Melbourne suburb of Prahran, but was taken to England by his family in 1905 and educated at Chelston School, Torquay. His family returned to Australia in 1911 and he attended Hawksburn State School in the inner Melbourne suburb of South Yarra. In 1913, he started working as an office boy in a legal practice. He studied law at the University of Melbourne from 1916 to 1918, and was admitted as a barrister and solicitor in March 1921, later establishing a successful legal practice. He married Lavinia May Webster in June 1924.

== Political career ==
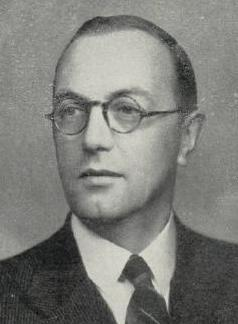
Spicer early in his political career

Spicer won a seat in the Senate as a United Australia Party candidate at the 1940 election. In the Senate, he spoke frequently on tax issues and promoted "sound and honest finance". Spicer was defeated at the 1943 election. He strongly opposed Ben Chifley's bank nationalisation and acted for the English banks in court action on the issue. He took silk in 1948.

Spicer returned to the Senate as a Liberal Party candidate in the December 1949 election, and was immediately appointed Attorney-General in the Menzies Government, even though his Senate term did not begin until February 1950. He was the first senator to hold the position since Josiah Symon in 1905. Spicer's first priority was to draft a bill banning the Communist Party of Australia. The Bill was eventually passed by the Parliament and became the Communist Party Dissolution Act 1950, but was later declared unconstitutional by the High Court of Australia. In 1952, he drafted an official secrets bill which included a provision permitting the death penalty for spying and wide powers of search and arrest without warrant, but this was rejected by cabinet. He was also Minister for Transport for two weeks after George McLeay's death.

== Judicial career ==
In August 1956, Spicer resigned from parliament so that he could be appointed to the Commonwealth Industrial Court. He was made a Knight Bachelor in 1963.

Spicer presided over inquiries into aviation accidents:

- Trans Australia Airlines Flight 538, a Fokker F27 Friendship aircraft that crashed into the sea in 1960 while attempting to land in Mackay, Queensland, killing all 29 people on board.
- Ansett-ANA Flight 325, a Vickers Viscount aircraft that crashed into Botany Bay in 1961, killing all 15 people on board.
- Ansett-ANA Flight 149, a Vickers Viscount aircraft that crashed near Winton, Queensland in 1966, killing all 24 people on board.

Spicer also chaired a royal commission in 1964 into the sinking of HMAS Voyager. He found that officers in both Voyager and HMAS Melbourne had been at fault. A second royal commission in 1967-68 attributed blame to Voyager's officers only.

Spicer retired in 1976, and died in the Melbourne suburb of Armadale two years later, survived by his wife and son.

== Notes ==
Political offices
Preceded by H. V. Evatt	Attorney-General; 1949–1956	Succeeded by Neil O'Sullivan
Preceded by George McLeay	Minister for Shipping and Transport; 1955	Succeeded by Shane Paltridge
