= Jack Beasley =

Australian politician (1895–1949)

The Right Honourable Jack Beasley
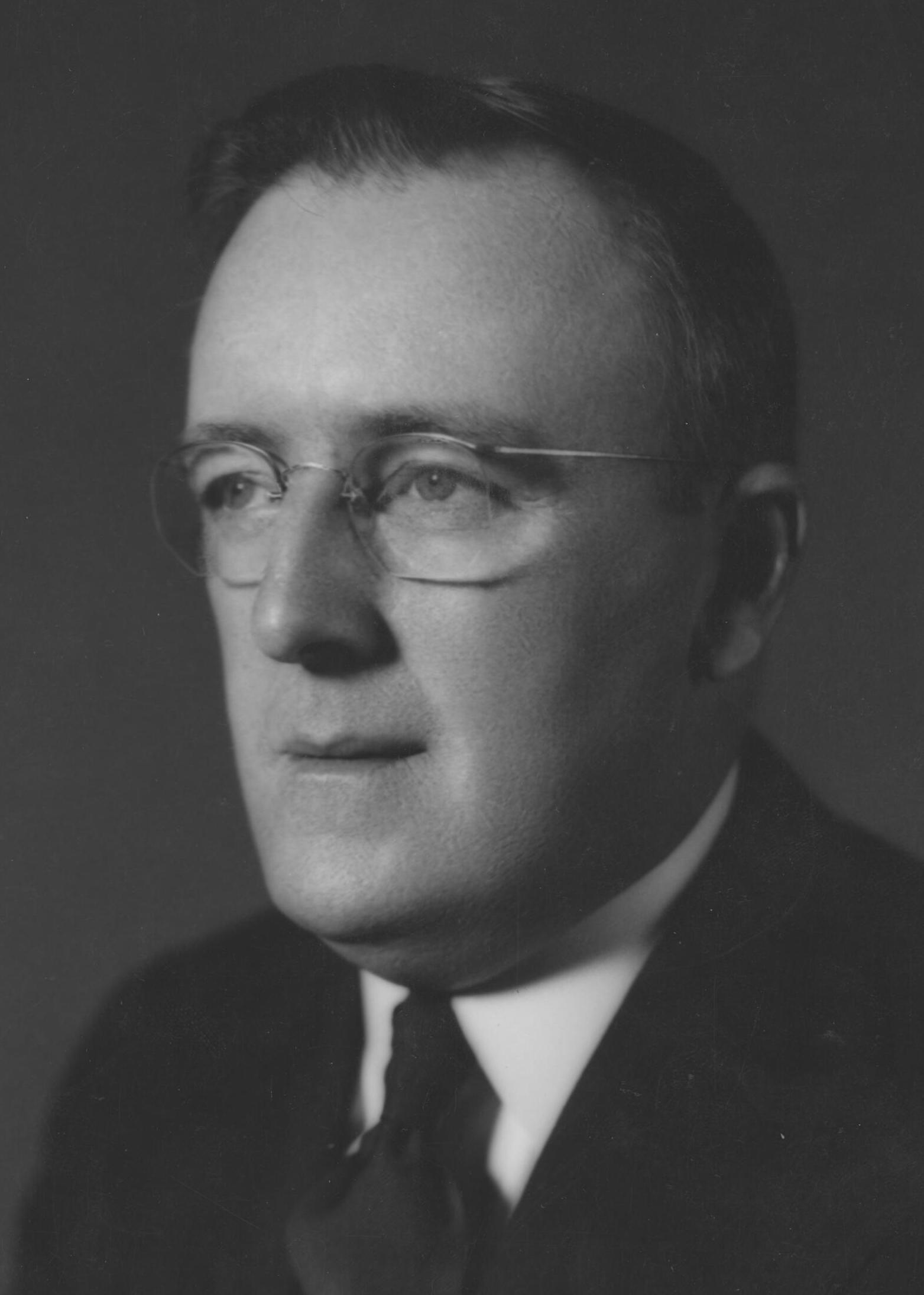

High Commissioner of Australia to the United Kingdom
- In office 14 August 1946 – 2 September 1949
- Preceded by: Stanley Bruce
- Succeeded by: Sir Norman Rupert Mighell CMG

Minister for Defence
- In office 6 July 1945 – 14 August 1946
- Prime Minister: Frank Forde; Ben Chifley
- Preceded by: John Curtin
- Succeeded by: Frank Forde

Minister for Supply and Shipping
- In office 17 October 1942 – 6 July 1945
- Prime Minister: John Curtin
- Preceded by: (new title)
- Succeeded by: Bill Ashley

Minister for Supply and Development
- In office 7 October 1941 – 17 October 1942
- Prime Minister: John Curtin
- Preceded by: George McLeay
- Succeeded by: (title abolished)

Member of the Australian Parliament for West Sydney
- In office 17 November 1928 – 14 August 1946
- Preceded by: William Lambert
- Succeeded by: William O'Connor

Personal details
- Born: 9 November 1895 Werribee, Victoria, Australia
- Died: 2 September 1949 (aged 53) Darlinghurst, New South Wales, Australia
- Resting place: Frenchs Forest Bushland Cemetery
- Party: Labor
- Other political affiliations: Lang Labor (1931–36); ALP (Non-Communist) (1940–41)
- Spouse: Alma Creighton (m. 1927)
- Occupation: Unionist

John Albert Beasley (9 November 1895 – 2 September 1949) was an Australian politician who was a member of the House of Representatives from 1928 to 1946. He served in the Australian War Cabinet from 1941 to 1946, and was a government minister in the Curtin and Chifley governments. Beasley was a member of the Australian Labor Party, although on two occasions he left the party to join the breakaway Lang Labor groups, leading the faction in federal parliament. He concluded his career as High Commissioner to the United Kingdom from 1946 until his death in 1949.

== Early life ==
Beasley was born on 9 November 1895 in Werribee, Victoria, the son of Catherine (née Hogan) and John Beasley. His mother was born in County Tipperary, Ireland, while his Australian-born father was a blacksmith and farmer. Beasley was educated at St Andrew's Catholic Primary School, but left at a young age to work on his father's farm. He later worked as a labourer in Tasmania and Adelaide, and then trained as an electrician in Port Augusta, South Australia, and Broken Hill, New South Wales. In 1918, Beasley moved to Sydney and found work at the Cockatoo Island Dockyard. He was employed by the Sydney Municipal Council in 1920, becoming an electrical installation inspector and then supervisor of appliance sales in the electricity department in 1926. On 5 February 1927, he married Alma Matilda Creighton at a Catholic church in Manly. The couple had two sons and two daughters together.

== Early political involvement ==
Beasley became involved in the labour movement as a shop steward for the Electrical Trades Union of Australia (ETU). He served as the union's president from 1924 to 1930, and was one of its delegates to the Labor Council of New South Wales, serving as president of the council from 1922 to 1928. Beasley was elected to the state executive of the Australian Labor Party in June 1923. Although initially sympathetic to communism and supportive of Jock Garden, he later moderated his views. He represented the ALP at the International Labour Conference in Switzerland in 1926, and returned to Australia "appalled at the excesses of Italian fascism and disconcerted by the realities of Russian communism".

== Federal politics ==
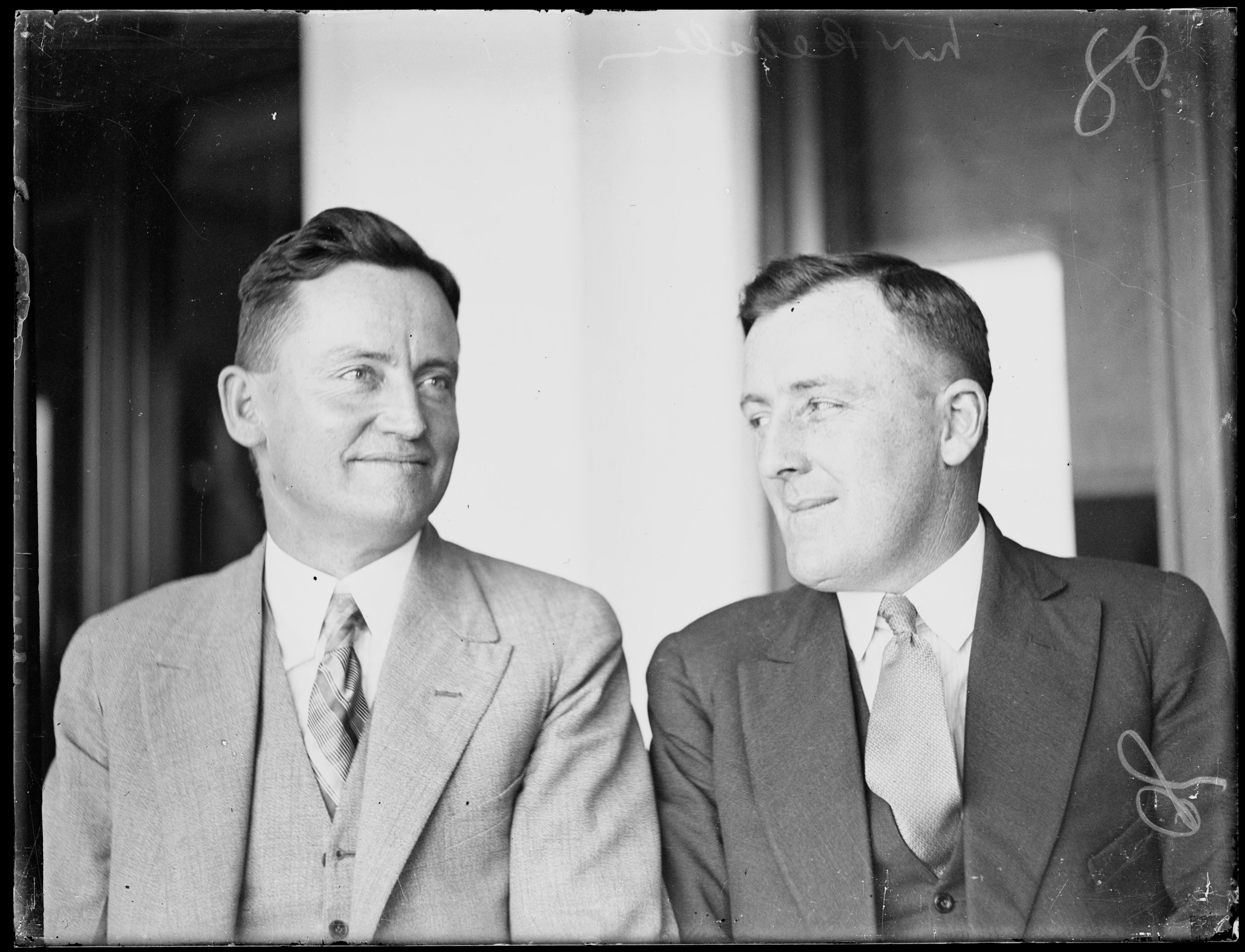
Beasley as a young MP in 1929, alongside future prime minister Frank Forde (left)

In 1928 Beasley was elected for the safe Labor seat of West Sydney. When Labor under Jim Scullin won the 1929 federal election, he became an Honorary Minister (minister without portfolio), but he resigned this position in 1931 in protest at the Scullin government's policies in response to the Great Depression. He became the leading lieutenant of the radical Premier of New South Wales, Jack Lang, and when Lang decided to break with the federal ALP Beasley resigned from the ALP Caucus and became leader of the Lang Labor party in federal Parliament. In December 1931 he led his group across the floor of the House and brought down the Scullin government on a vote of confidence. This earned him the nickname "Stabber Jack" for the rest of his life.

From 1932 to 1936 Beasley led the Lang group in opposition to both the United Australia Party government of Joseph Lyons and Federal Labor. In 1935 Scullin retired and in early 1936 the new federal leader, John Curtin, brought about a reunification of the NSW and Federal parties, and Beasley joined the Opposition front bench. But in 1940 Lang again broke off relations with the federal party, although by this time he was no longer Premier and no longer had the support of the NSW Branch as a whole. Nevertheless, Beasley again supported Lang and became leader of the so-called Non-Communist Labor Party in federal Parliament.

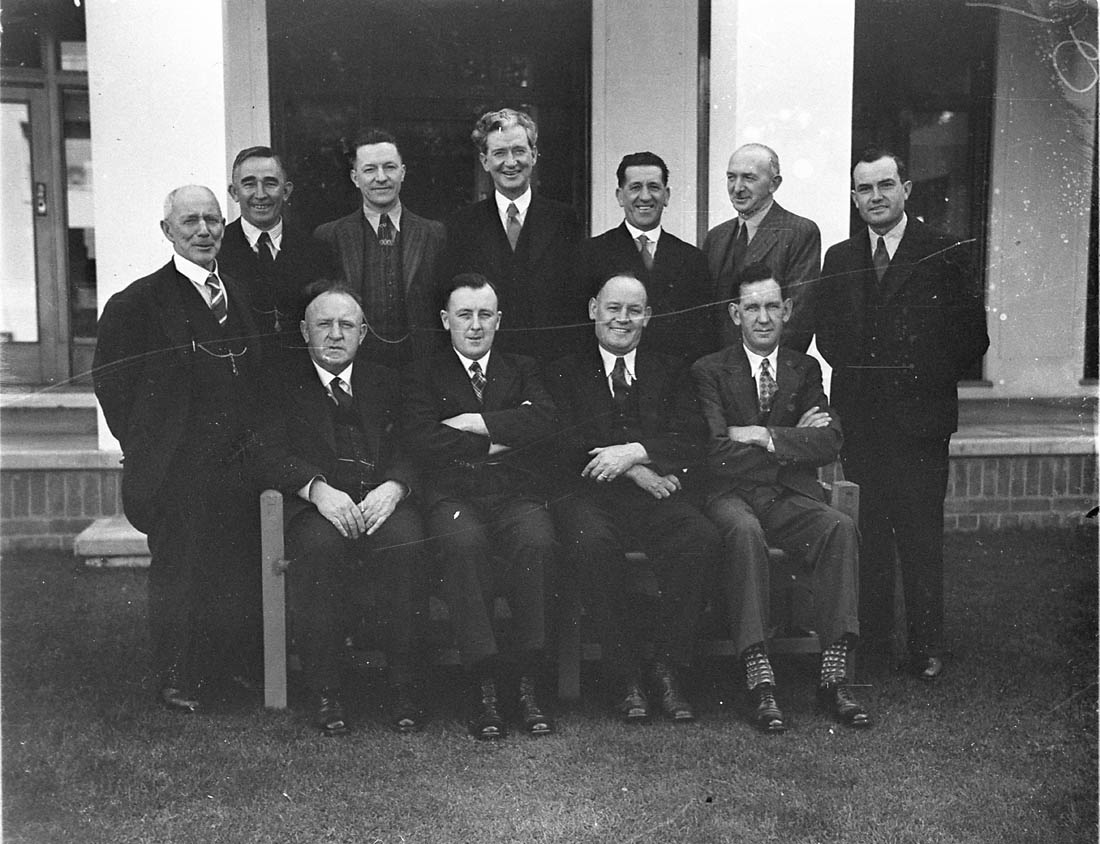
Lang Labor MPs in 1935 including Beasley

=== World War II ===
In 1941 Curtin again brought Lang's followers (although not Lang himself) back into the Labor Party. When Curtin became Prime Minister in October 1941, he made Beasley Minister for Supply and Development (later Minister for Supply and Shipping), a vital portfolio in wartime. Beasley proved to be a highly competent minister and played a leading role in co-ordinating Australia's wartime economy and supporting the Allied forces in the Pacific Theatre. Due to ill health he exchanged positions with Bill Ashley in February 1945 to take the undemanding Vice-President of the Executive Council.

== High Commissioner to the United Kingdom ==
When Curtin died in July 1945, his successor Ben Chifley made Beasley Minister for Defence, but Chifley had been a minister in the Scullin government and had been the leading opponent of Lang in the NSW ALP through the 1930s. He had not forgiven Beasley and did not want him in the Cabinet, so in 1946 Beasley was appointed High Commissioner in London. He was appointed to the Privy Council in 1946. and was a leading guest at the 1947 wedding of Princess Elizabeth and Philip, Duke of Edinburgh. He served as High Commissioner until his sudden death in September 1949 on a visit to Sydney at St Vincent's Hospital, Darlinghurst.

Political offices
Preceded by George McLeay	Minister for Supply and Development/ Minister for Supply and Shipping; 1941–1945	Succeeded by Bill Ashley
Preceded by Bill Ashley	Vice-President of the Executive Council; 1945	Succeeded by Joe Collings
Preceded by John Curtin	Minister for Defence; 1945–1946	Succeeded by Frank Forde
Parliament of Australia
Preceded by William Lambert	Member for West Sydney; 1928–1946	Succeeded by William O'Connor
Diplomatic posts
Preceded by The Viscount Bruce	Australian High Commissioner to the United Kingdom; 1946–1949	Succeeded by Norman Mighell (Acting)
