= Australian Labor Party (Non-Communist) =

- Abbreviation: ALP (N-C)
- Founder: Jack Lang
- Federal parliamentary leader: Jack Beasley
- Founded: 18 April 1940; 1943
- Dissolved: February 1941; 1950
- Split from: Australian Labor Party
- Merged into: Australian Labor Party
- Headquarters: Sydney, New South Wales, Australia
- Ideology: Labour politics Anti-communism

The Australian Labor Party (Non-Communist), which operated from 1940 to 1941, was a breakaway from the Australian Labor Party (ALP), and was associated with the Lang Labor faction and former New South Wales premier Jack Lang.

== History ==
=== 1940–1941 ===
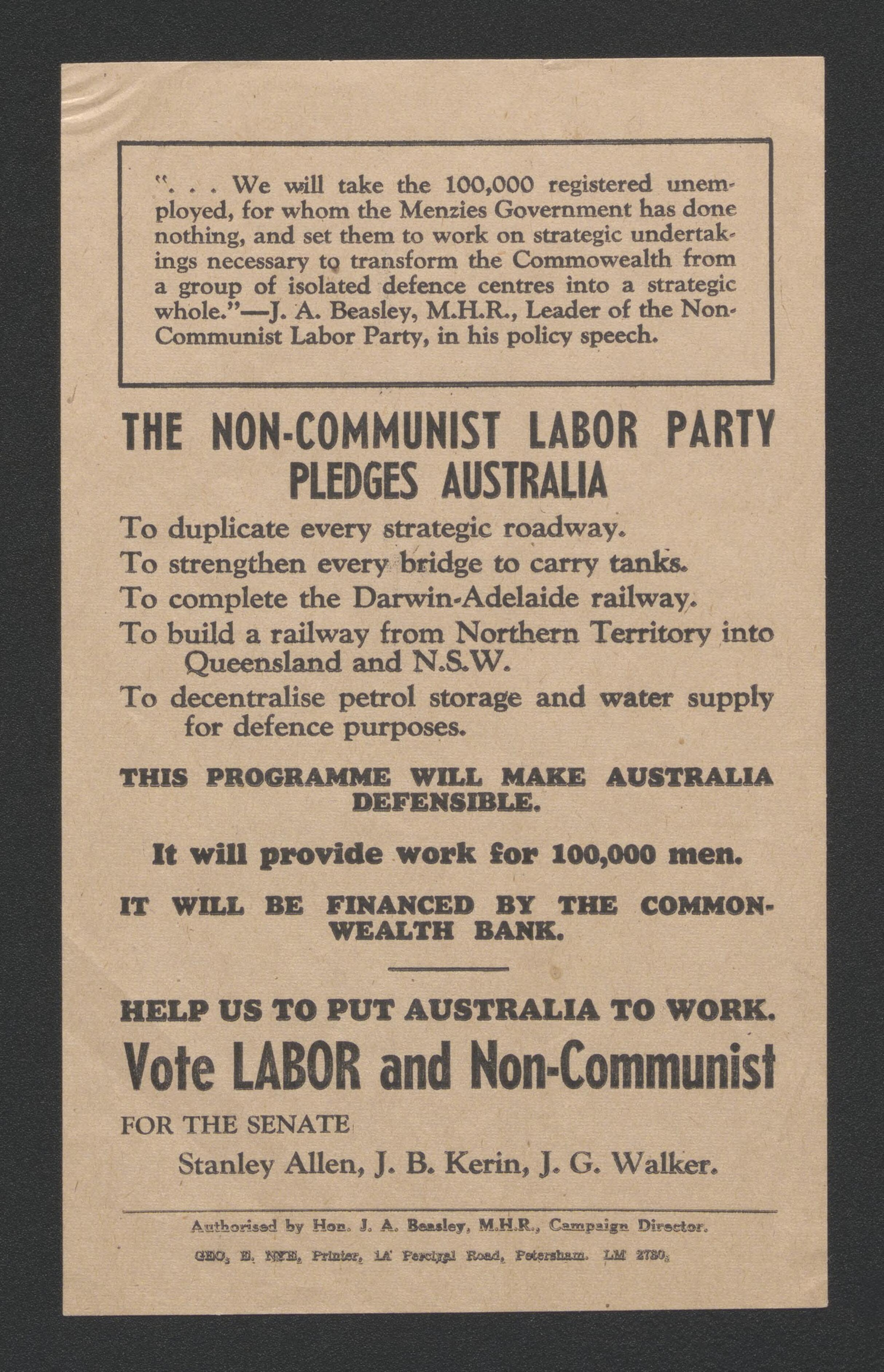
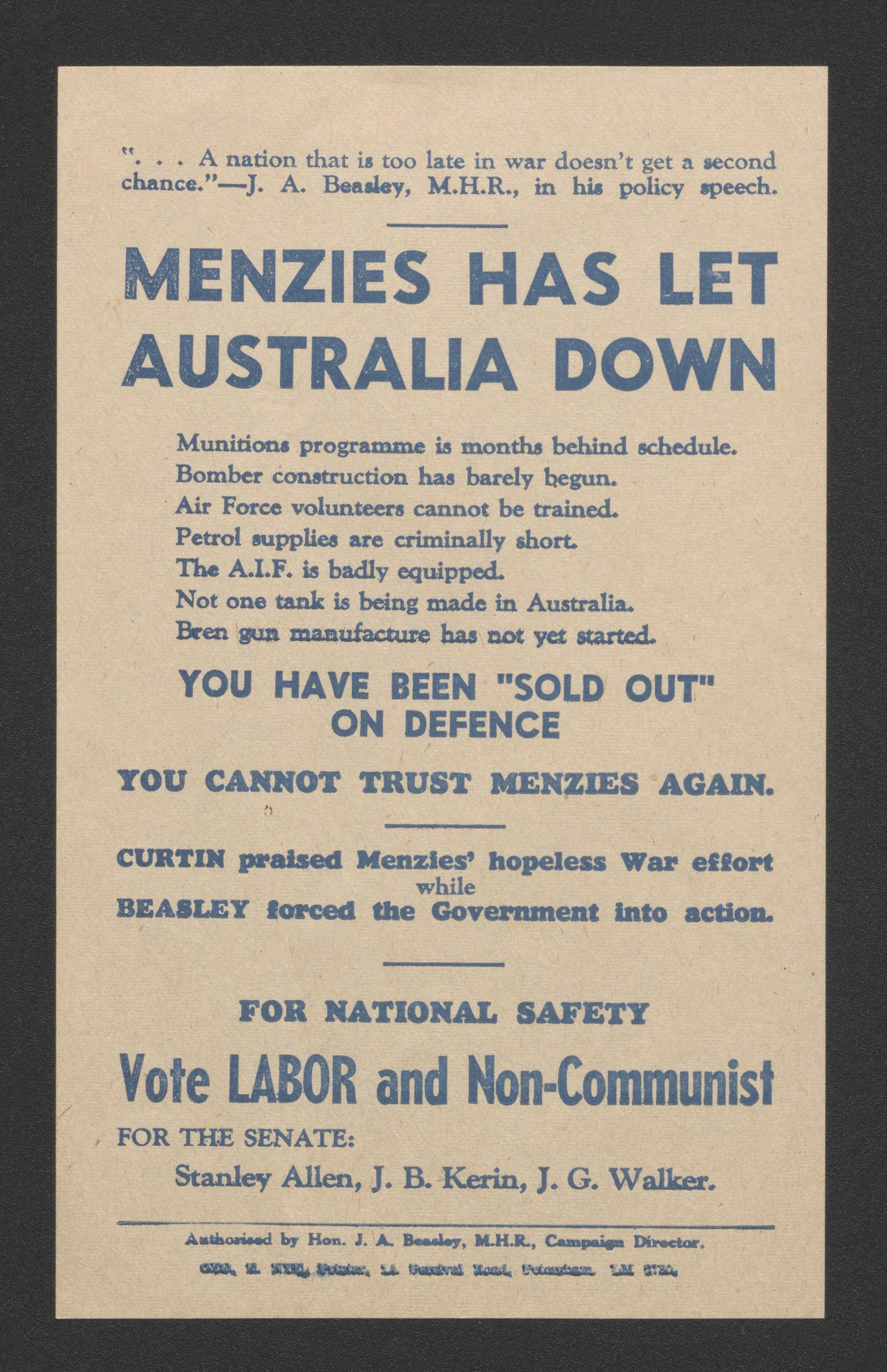
Campaign material used by the party at the 1940 federal election

Lang lost the leadership of the New South Wales state branch of the ALP in 1939. Prior to that, between 1931 and 1936, the NSW branch, led by Lang, had been expelled from the ALP and ran in elections as the Australian Labor Party (New South Wales), also known as Lang Labor. After the reconciliation of the NSW branch and ALP, left-wing forces gained control of the extra-parliamentary executive of the NSW Branch and, in 1940, the state executive adopted a policy calling for a "Hands off Russia", which was seen as opposing Australian involvement in World War II. Lang denounced that stance; despite his radicalism, he had always been strongly anti-Communist. He seceded from Labor, along with several supporters, and formed a new party called the "Australian Labor Party (Non-Communist)".

On 18 April 1940, Lang announced the creation of the Australian Labor Party (Non-Communist). In federal parliament, seven ALP members defected to the new party, with Jack Beasley chosen as leader. He was joined by fellow MPs Sol Rosevear, Joe Gander, Dan Mulcahy, and Tom Sheehan, as well as senators Stan Amour and John Armstrong. In the Parliament of New South Wales, fifteen ALP members defected – nine in the Legislative Assembly (including Lang) and six in the Legislative Council. Federal opposition leader, John Curtin, reacted angrily to the news, declaring the defectors had "wrecked the solidarity of Labor at a time of great crisis".

Lang Labor contested the 1940 federal election. Unlike the previous Lang Labor, Lang and his allies were in a minority in New South Wales, and many of his old supporters, such as Eddie Ward, remained loyal to ALP leader John Curtin. Lang candidates polled poorly. The Federal Executive again intervened in the NSW branch and expelled the leftist elements. Some members joined the Communist Party of Australia, but most joined the short-lived State Labor Party, which was also known as the State Labor Party (Hughes-Evans). Following the Federal intervention, prior to the May 1941 state election, Lang, and nearly all of his followers, rejoined the ALP. The reunification helped Labor to form government at the federal level in October 1941, with Curtin becoming Prime Minister of Australia.

=== 1943–1950 ===
In 1943, having published newspaper articles attacking McKell (NSW's Premier since 1941) and Prime Minister John Curtin, Lang was expelled from the ALP and restarted the Australian Labor Party (Non-Communist). This manifestation of Lang Labor contested the 1944 NSW election, electing two members—Lang and Lilian Fowler, Australia's first female mayor. When Lang transferred to federal politics, he was succeeded as the Lang Labor member for Auburn by his son James. Although Fowler and Chris Lang were both re-elected in the 1947 NSW election, they were defeated in 1950, leading to the party essentially being defunct.

During Lang's expulsion, the ALP continued to enjoy their greatest House of Representatives victory both in terms of proportion of seats and their strongest national two-party vote at the 1943 federal election and additionally their first successful federal re-election attempt as a full term government at the 1946 federal election. During this election Lang was elected to the House of Representatives for the federal seat of Reid, being elected with the benefit of Liberal Party preferences. Lang was a nuisance to the Labor government led, since 1945, by Ben Chifley, whom he repeatedly castigated in public. He lost his seat at the 1949 election. In the double dissolution 1951 election he stood for the Senate, but was not elected.
