= George McLeay =

Australian politician

The Honourable George McLeay
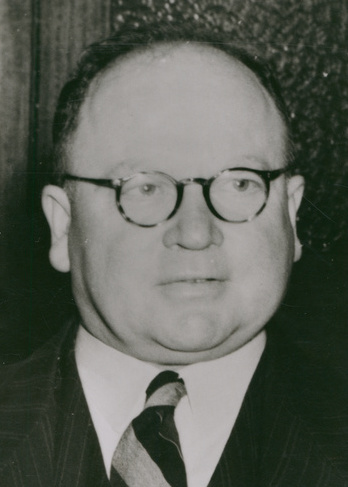

Leader of the Opposition in the Senate
- In office 7 October 1941 – 31 May 1947
- Preceded by: Joe Collings
- Succeeded by: Walter Cooper

Leader of the Government in the Senate
- In office 8 November 1938 – 7 October 1941
- Preceded by: Alexander McLachlan
- Succeeded by: Joe Collings

Senator for South Australia
- In office 22 February 1950 – 14 September 1955
- Preceded by: seat established
- Succeeded by: Nancy Buttfield
- In office 1 July 1935 – 30 June 1947
- Preceded by: Bert Hoare
- Succeeded by: Frederick Ward

Personal details
- Born: 6 August 1892 Port Clinton, South Australia
- Died: 14 September 1955 (aged 63) North Adelaide, South Australia
- Party: Liberal
- Spouse: Marcia Doreen Weston
- Children: 1 son, 1 daughter

George McLeay (6 August 1892 – 14 September 1955) was an Australian politician and senior minister in the Menzies Liberal government.

== Early life ==
McLeay was born in Port Clinton, South Australia and educated at Port Clinton Public School until 1906 when he was sent to Adelaide where he continued his education at Unley Public School. At the outbreak of World War I, he was rejected for service in the First Australian Imperial Force and did civilian war work instead. He and his younger brother Jack – who also became a federal politician, as did his son, John – set up as accountants and agents and eventually became wholesale and retail merchants. In October 1924, he married Marcia Doreen Weston.

== Political career ==
At twenty McLeay joined the Liberal Union and in 1922 ran unsuccessfully for election for the seat of Adelaide in the House of Representatives. In the 1934 elections, he was elected to the Australian Senate. He was leader of the government in the Senate from November 1938 to October 1941 and Vice-President of the Executive Council from November 1938 to March 1940 and from October 1940 to October 1941. He was Minister for Commerce from April 1939 to March 1940 in the first Menzies Ministry and Minister for Trade and Customs from March to October 1940 in the second Menzies Ministry. He was Postmaster-General in the third Menzies Ministry from October 1940 until the fall of the government in August 1941 and Minister for Repatriation until June 1941 and Minister for Supply and Development from June to October 1941.

McLeay was leader of the opposition in the Senate from 1941 until the end of his Senate term in June 1947. He was defeated in the 1946 elections, but re-elected to the Senate in 1949 elections. Robert Menzies appointed him Minister for Shipping and Fuel in 1949; Minister for Shipping, Fuel and Transport in 1950; and Minister for Shipping and Transport in 1951. He energetically negotiated with shipowners and trade unions to improve the performance of the ports. As with other senior federal politicians, a locality on the Trans-Australian Railway was named after him – an isolated crossing loop 118 kilometres (70 miles) west of Port Augusta. In 1954, the Commonwealth Railways mounted his name on a diesel locomotive – NSU class no. 51.

McLeay suffered from diabetes mellitus and was affected by excessive travel. He died from ischaemic heart disease at Calvary Hospital, North Adelaide, survived by his wife, son and daughter.

== Notes ==
Political offices
Preceded by Billy Hughes	Vice-President of the Executive Council; 1938–1939	Succeeded by James Fairbairn
Preceded by Earle Page	Minister for Commerce; 1939–1940	Succeeded by Archie Cameron
Preceded by Robert Menzies	Minister for Trade and Customs; 1940	Succeeded by Eric Harrison
Preceded by Eric Harrison	Postmaster-General; 1940–1941	Succeeded by Thomas Collins
Preceded by Herbert Collett	Vice-President of the Executive Council; 1940–1941	Succeeded by Richard Keane
Preceded by Philip McBride	Minister for Repatriation; 1940–1941	Succeeded by Herbert Collett
Preceded by Philip McBride	Minister for Supply and Development; 1941	Succeeded by Jack Beasley
Preceded by Howard Beale	Minister for Shipping and Fuel; Minister for Shipping, Fuel and Transport; Minister for Shipping and Transport; 1949–1955	Succeeded by John Spicer
Party political offices
Preceded by Alexander McLachlan	Leader of the United Australia Party in the Senate; 1938–1945	Defunct political party
New political party	Leader of the Liberal Party in the Senate; 1945–1947	Vacant Title next held by Neil O'Sullivan
