= Joe Collings =

Australian politician (1865–1955)

The Honourable Joe Collings
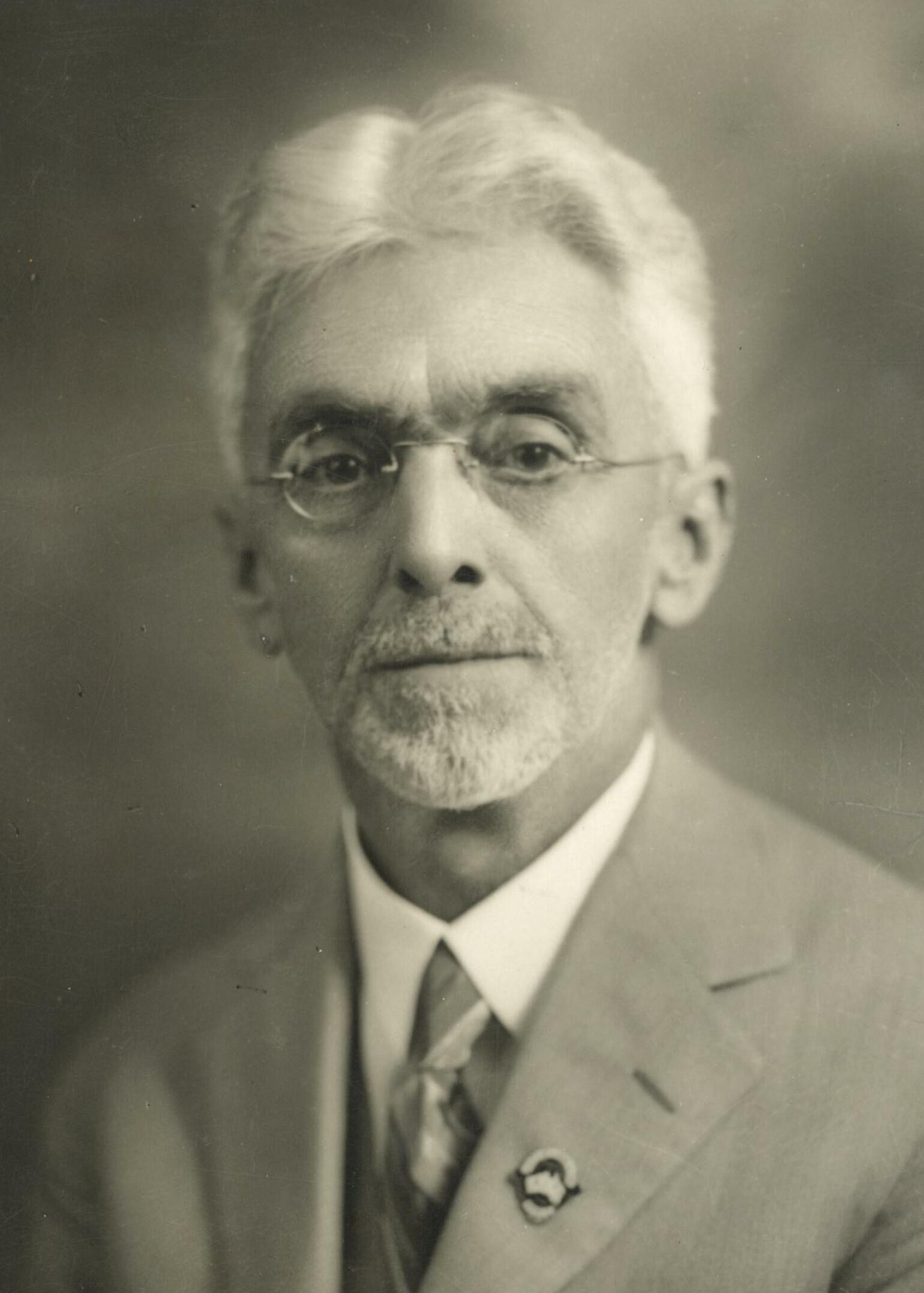

Minister for the Interior
- In office 7 October 1941 – 13 July 1945
- Prime Minister: John Curtin; Frank Forde
- Preceded by: Harry Foll
- Succeeded by: Herbert Johnson

Leader of the Government in the Senate
- In office 7 October 1941 – 20 September 1943
- Preceded by: George McLeay
- Succeeded by: Richard Keane

Leader of the Opposition in the Senate
- In office 1 July 1935 – 7 October 1941
- Preceded by: John Barnes
- Succeeded by: George McLeay

Senator for Queensland
- In office 1 July 1932 – 30 June 1950

Member of the Queensland Legislative Council
- In office 19 February 1920 – 23 March 1922

Personal details
- Born: Joseph Silver Collings; 11 May 1865 Brighton, Sussex, England
- Died: 20 June 1955 (aged 90) Brighton, Queensland, Australia
- Party: Labor
- Spouse: Kate McInerney (m. 1886; died 1917)
- Occupation: Trade union official

Joseph Silver Collings (11 May 1865 – 20 June 1955) was an Australian trade unionist and politician. He was a member of the Australian Labor Party (ALP) and served as a Senator for Queensland from 1932 to 1950. He was a cabinet minister in the Curtin and Chifley governments from 1941 to 1946.

== Early life ==
Collings was born on 11 May 1865 in Brighton, England. He was the son of Mary Ann (née Dyke) and Joseph Silver Collings. His parents were both religious non-conformists, with his father being a Freethinker and his mother being a Quaker.

Collings was educated at a board school in Brighton. After leaving school he became a cadet journalist for the Sussex Daily News. He moved to Australia with his parents in 1883, settling in Queensland. He worked as a farm labourer for a period and unsuccessfully took up a selection near Mooloolah.

Collings later found work in the footwear industry and was at one time secretary of the Queensland Boot and Shoe Manufacturers' Association. He worked with "scabs" during a strike in 1895 and was ostracised by the Australian Boot Trade Employees' Federation although he worked hard for the labour movement. His support for the 1912 Brisbane general strike led to him being forgiven by the unions and he subsequently established the Federated Clerks' Union in Queensland.

== Early political involvement ==
Collings unsuccessfully contested elections to the Legislative Assembly of Queensland in 1908, 1909, and 1915, but was elected to Balmoral Shire Council from 1910 to 1913. He attended Labor Party conventions from 1905 and was elected to the Queensland central executive of the party between 1913 and 1928. From 1914 to 1915 and 1919 to 1931 he was an organiser for the party. In 1916 he campaigned vigorously against conscription in Queensland and Victoria. He was appointed to the Queensland Legislative Council in 1920 and took part in the successful vote to abolish it in 1922. In 1931 he was organising secretary for the provisional state executive set up by the federal party to replace the expelled Lang Labor executive.

== Senate career ==
Collings was elected to the Senate at the 1931 federal election, to a six-year term beginning on 1 July 1932. He was 67 years old at the time he took his seat, but would nonetheless remain in the Senate for 18 years, winning re-election to further six-year terms at the 1937 and 1943 elections.

Following the collapse of the Fadden government in 1941, Collings became Leader of the Government in the Senate and was appointed Minister for the Interior in the Curtin government. Much of the minister's ordinary responsibilities for public works were delegated to the Allied Works Council, headed by former ALP treasurer Ted Theodore. He retained responsibility for the Commonwealth Electoral Office, Commonwealth Railways and administration of the national capital Canberra, where he retained existing liquor restrictions and introduced a new ban on Saturday afternoon sales of liquor.

Following Curtin's death in July 1945, Collings was appointed to the largely honorary role of Vice-President of the Executive Council in the Chifley government. He was not reappointed to the ministry after the 1946 election. He did not contest the 1949 election and retired from the Senate in June 1950. Along with Gordon Brown, Collings was joint Father of the Senate from 1947 to 1950. Collings, at 85 years of age, remains the oldest person to have served in the Senate.

== Later life ==
In 1886, Collings married Kate McInerney, with whom he had four children. His wife died of meningitis in 1917.

Collings died on 20 June 1955 at his home in Brighton, Queensland, survived by one son and one daughter of his six children. He was accorded a state funeral and cremated.

Political offices
Preceded by Harry Foll	Minister for the Interior; 1941–1945	Succeeded by Herbert Johnson
Preceded by Jack Beasley	Vice-President of the Executive Council; 1945–1946	Succeeded by William Scully
Party political offices
Preceded by John Barnes	Leader of the Australian Labor Party in the Senate; 1935–1943	Succeeded by Richard Keane
