= John Barnes (Australian politician) =

Australian politician and union official

The Honourable John Barnes
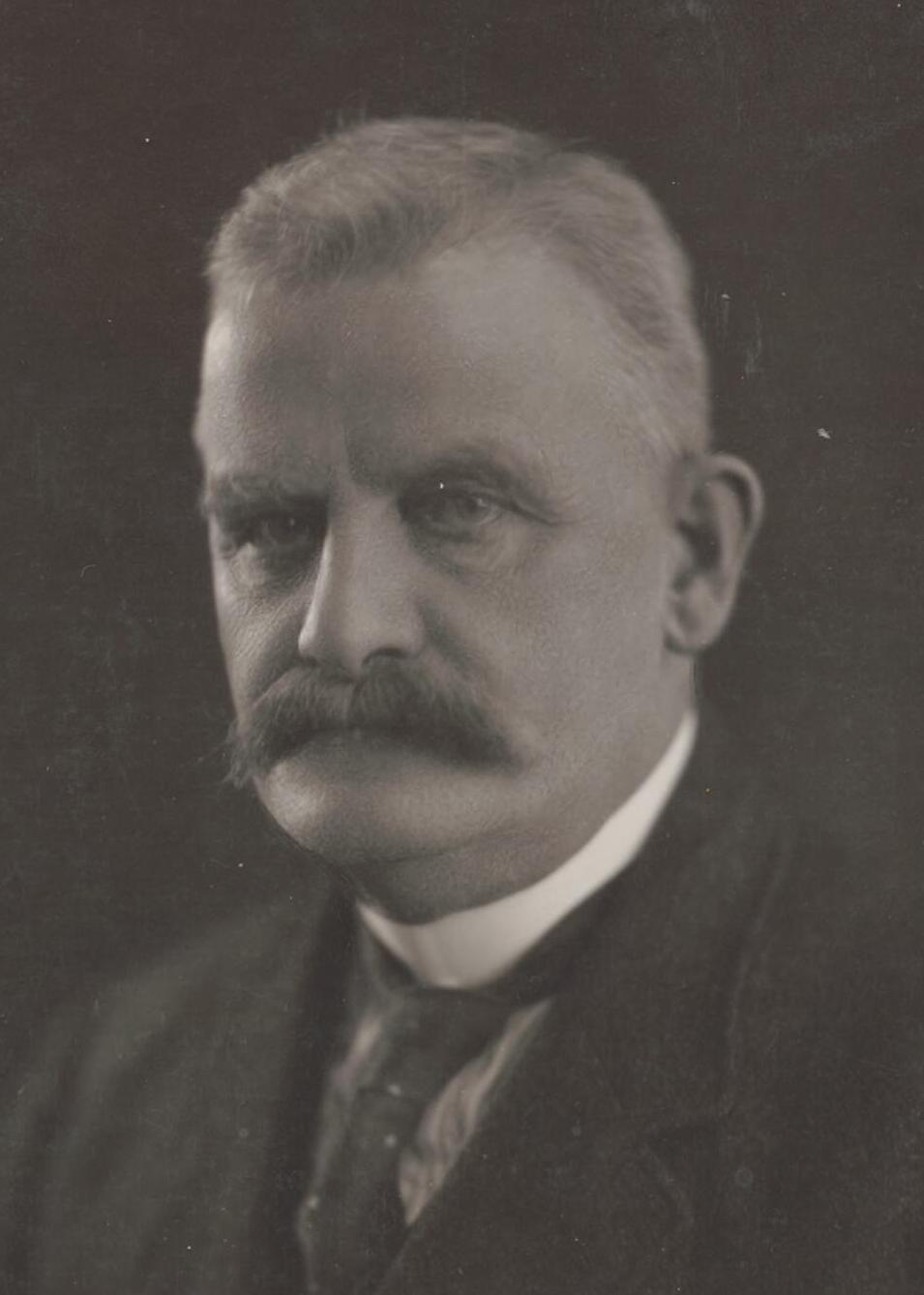

Leader of the Opposition in the Senate
- In office 6 January 1932 – 30 June 1935
- Preceded by: George Pearce
- Succeeded by: Joe Collings

Leader of the Government in the Senate
- In office 3 March 1931 – 6 January 1932
- Preceded by: John Daly
- Succeeded by: George Pearce

Senator for Victoria
- In office 1 July 1913 – 30 June 1920
- In office 1 July 1923 – 30 June 1935

Personal details
- Born: 17 July 1868 Hamilton, South Australia, Australia
- Died: 31 January 1938 (aged 69) East Melbourne, Victoria, Australia
- Party: Labor
- Spouse: Ellen Abbott (m. 1898)
- Occupation: Labourer; Shearer; Miner

John Barnes (17 July 1868 – 31 January 1938) was an Australian trade unionist and politician. He was a member of the Australian Labor Party (ALP) and served as a Senator for Victoria from 1913 to 1920 and 1923 to 1935. He was his party's Senate leader from 1931 to 1935 and served as Vice-President of the Executive Council in the Scullin government from 1931 to 1932.

== Early life ==
Barnes was born on 17 July 1868 in Hamilton, South Australia. He was the son of Mary (née Cummeford) and John Thomas Barnes. His father was a labourer originally from Somerset, England, while his mother was from County Clare, Ireland.

Barnes' father died when he was six years old and he had a limited formal education. He left school at a young age and worked a variety of jobs, including as a roustabout, timber-getter and handyman. While travelling in search of work he lived out of a swag, reputedly carrying the works of Adam Smith, Henry George, Robert Blatchford and Henry Lawson with him. Barnes eventually began working in shearing sheds, initially as a shed hand and "tar boy" and then as a shearer. By the late 1880s he had settled in Broken Hill, New South Wales, where he joined the Amalgamated Shearers' Union in 1887. He also worked as a miner for a period.

== Union movement ==
In 1894, Barnes was involved in the merger of the Amalgamated Shearers' Union into the new Australian Workers' Union (AWU). He was the first AWU agent in Broken Hill and later returned to South Australia where he was the AWU's first paid organiser. Barnes later served as the secretary of the AWU's Victoria/Riverina division from 1909 to 1913, based in Ballarat. He was elected federal president of the AWU in 1923, a position he would hold until his death in 1938.

== Politics ==
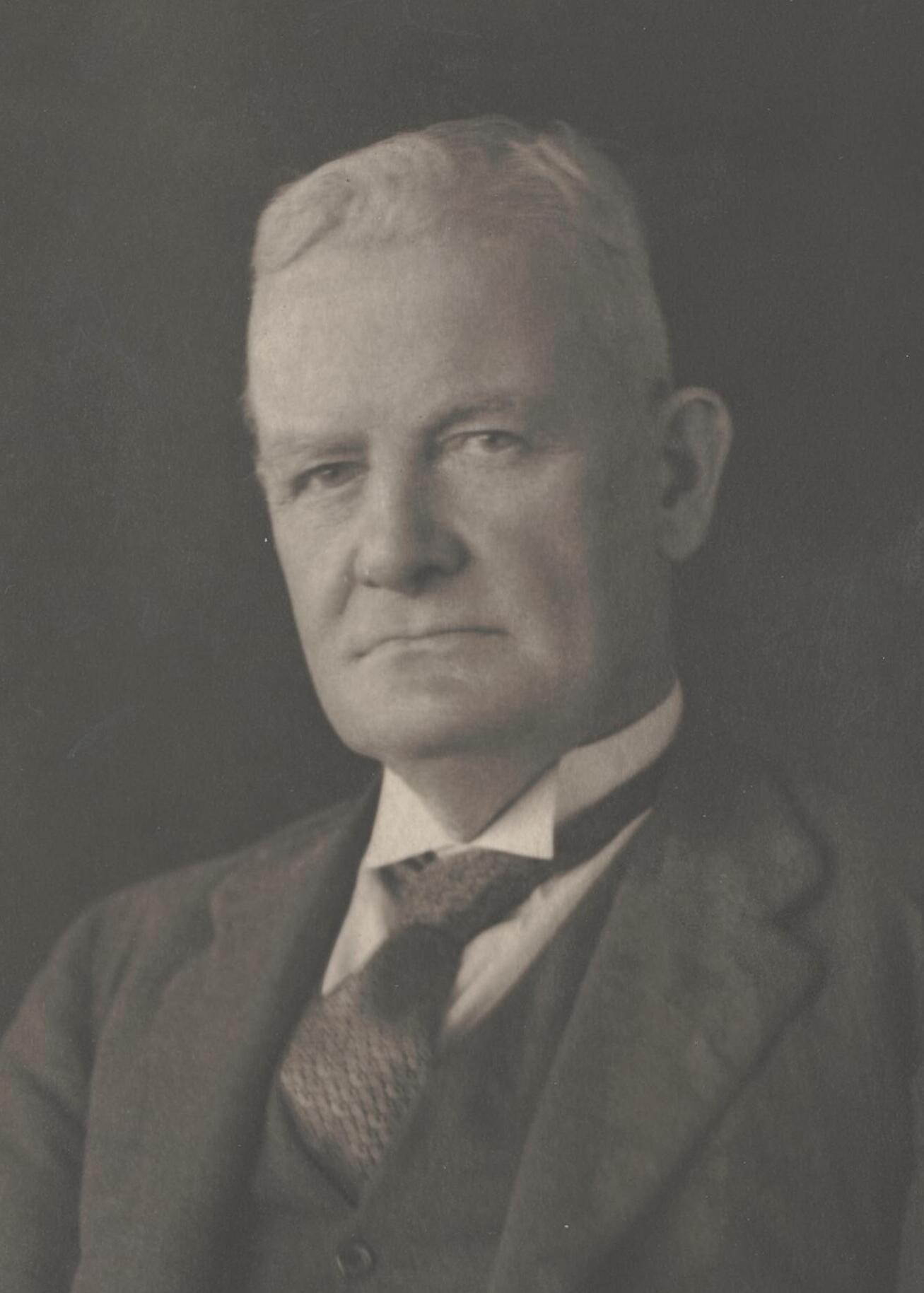
Barnes c. 1930

Barnes was first elected to the Senate at the 1913 federal election, winning a six-year term beginning on 1 July 1913. His initial term was cut short by a double dissolution, but he was re-elected to a further six-year term at the 1914 election.

Barnes was defeated at the 1919 general election.

== Late life and legacy ==
Barnes, however was suffering from cancer and died in East Melbourne on 31 January 1938 as a senator-elect. He left a widow, one son and five daughters. He was given a state funeral, the procession travelling through the city, pausing at Trades Hall, and continuing to the Melbourne General Cemetery.

Political offices
| Preceded by John Daly | Vice-President of the Executive Council; 1931–1932 | Succeeded by Alexander McLachlan |
Party political offices
| Preceded by John Daly | Leader of the Australian Labor Party in the Senate; 1931–1935 | Succeeded by Joe Collings |
