= Liberal Party of Australia =

Political party in Australia

- Abbreviation: LP; LIB
- Leader: Angus Taylor
- Deputy Leader: Jane Hume; Andrew Hastie (Note: The position of "Deputy Leader in the House of Representatives" is held by Hastie. As Hume is a member of the Senate, it was necessary to elect a House-only deputy for procedural reasons.)
- Senate Leader: Michaelia Cash
- Deputy Senate Leader: Anne Ruston
- President: Tony Abbott
- Founder: Robert Menzies (Note: Menzies is the party's most prominent co-founder, having been the party's first and longest serving leader. Furthermore, he is often cited as the "founder" or "father" of the party.)
- Founded: 13 October 1944; 82 years ago (Note: The Liberal Party acknowledges the party's formation date to be 13 October 1944, which was the first day of a three-day meeting called the "Conference of Representatives of Non-Labour Organisations" in Canberra. The name and objectives were adopted at the conference, with the party constitution and organisation being decided two months later at the Albury Conference (15–16 December 1944). The only other date that has been cited for the founding of the party is 31 August 1945.)
- Preceded by: United Australia Party
- Headquarters: R. G. Menzies House, Barton, Australian Capital Territory
- Think tank: Menzies Research Centre
- Student wing: Liberal Students' Federation
- Youth wing: Young Liberals
- Women's wing: Federal Women's Committee
- Overseas wing: Australian Liberals Abroad
- LGBTQ wing: Liberal Pride
- Membership (2026): ▼50,000
- Ideology: Liberal conservatism; Conservatism (Australian); Liberalism (Australian); Factions: Right-wing populism; Australian nationalism
- Political position: Centre-right to right-wing
- National affiliation: Liberal–National Coalition (since 2026)
- Regional affiliation: Asia Pacific Democracy Union
- European affiliation: European Conservatives and Reformists Party (regional partner, until 2022)
- International affiliation: International Democracy Union
- Factions: Moderates; Centre Right; National Right
- Colours: Blue
- Governing body: Federal Council
- Party branches: ACT; NI; NSW; NT (Note: The Country Liberal Party was formed as a merger of the Northern Territory branches of the Country Party (today the National Party) and the Liberal Party. It mainly functions at the territory-level.); Qld (Note: The Liberal National Party of Queensland was formed as a merger of the Queensland branch of the Liberal Party and the National Party. It mainly functions at the state-level.); SA; Tas; Vic; WA
- House of Representatives: 27 / 150 (Note: Including the 10 LNP MPs who sit in the Liberal party room.)
- Senate: 23 / 76 (Note: Including the 2 LNP Senators and 1 CLP Senator who sit in the Liberal party room.)
- State and territorial governments: 3 / 8
- State and territorial lower house members: 165 / 465
- State upper house members: 41 / 156

Website
- www.liberal.org.au

The Liberal Party of Australia is the major conservative and centre-right to right-wing political party in Australia. Historically the most electorally successful party in Australia, it was founded in 1944 by Robert Menzies to act as the successor to the United Australia Party. It is part of the Liberal–National Coalition—one of the two major groupings in Australian politics—with its main rival being the Labor Party.

The Liberal Party is the senior partner in a conservative alliance known in Australian politics as the Liberal–National Coalition, accompanied by the regional-based National Party, which is typically focused on issues pertinent to regional Australia. When in government, the party leader is the prime minister, with the leader of the National Party traditionally serving as deputy prime minister. The party's current leader is Angus Taylor. As leader of the Liberal Party, Taylor is also the leader of the Opposition. A leading member of the party's National Right faction, he was elected leader in 2026. Two past leaders of the party, Robert Menzies and John Howard, are Australia's two longest-serving Prime Ministers.

The Liberal Party has a federal structure, with autonomous divisions in all six states and the Australian Capital Territory (ACT). The Country Liberal Party (CLP) of the Northern Territory is an affiliate. Both the CLP and the Liberal National Party (LNP) of Queensland were formed through mergers of the local Liberal and National parties. At the state and territory level, the Liberal Party is in office in two states (Queensland and Tasmania) and one territory (Northern Territory). The party is in opposition in the states of New South Wales, Victoria, South Australia, and Western Australia, and in the ACT.

The party's ideology has been referred to as liberal, conservative, liberal-conservative, conservative-liberal, and classical liberal. The Liberal Party tends to promote economic liberalism and social conservatism. The Moderate faction has been referred to as centrist, while the National Right faction has also been referred to as right-wing and right-wing populist.

== History ==
=== Origins ===
The Liberals Party's immediate predecessor was the United Australia Party (UAP). Its ideological ancestry originated to the anti-Labor groupings during the first Commonwealth parliaments: the Free Trade Party (later the Anti-Socialist Party) and the Protectionist Party. These parties merged in 1909 as the Commonwealth Liberal Party, led by Prime Minister Alfred Deakin, in response to the growing electoral prominence of the Labor Party. Following the Labor Party's split in 1916, the Commonwealth Liberal Party merged into the Nationalist Party in 1917 with several Labor outcasts, including Billy Hughes. While dominated by former Liberals, Hughes became its first leader. The Nationalists governed until 1929.

After another split of the Labor Party, Nationalist Party merged with additional Labor dissidents to form the United Australia Party in 1931, with Labor Party defector Joseph Lyons as its leader. The political positions of Lyons and other Labor defectors, against the more radical positions of the Labor movement on how to address the Great Depression had attracted the support of prominent Australian conservatives. With Australia still suffering the effects of the Depression, the newly formed party won a landslide victory at the 1931 federal election, with the Lyons government going on to win three consecutive elections. It largely avoided Keynesian pump-priming and pursued a more conservative fiscal policy of debt reduction and balanced budgets as a means of stewarding Australia out of the Depression.

Lyons' death in 1939 resulted in Robert Menzies assuming the role of prime minister shortly before the Second World War. Menzies served as the prime minister from 1939 to 1941, but resigned as leader of a wartime minority government amidst an unworkable parliamentary majority. The UAP, now led by Billy Hughes, was dissolved after suffering a heavy defeat in the 1943 election. In New South Wales, the party merged with the Commonwealth Party to form the Democratic Party, In Queensland the state party was absorbed into the Queensland People's Party.

From 1942 onward, Menzies had maintained his public profile with his series of "The Forgotten People" radio talks—similar to Franklin D. Roosevelt's fireside chats of the 1930s—in which he spoke of the middle class as the "backbone of Australia" but as nevertheless having been "taken for granted" by political parties.

Menzies called a conference of conservative parties and other groups opposed to the ruling Labor Party, which met in Canberra on 13 October 1944 and again in Albury, New South Wales in December 1944. Outlining his vision for a new political movement, Menzies said:

[W]hat we must look for, and it is a matter of desperate importance to our society, is a true revival of liberal thought which will work for social justice and security, for national power and national progress, and for the full development of the individual citizen, though not through the dull and deadening process of socialism.

The formation of the party was formally announced at Sydney Town Hall on 31 August 1945. It took the name Liberal in honour of the old Commonwealth Liberal Party. The new party was dominated by the remains of the old UAP; with few exceptions, the UAP party room became the Liberal Party room. The Australian Women's National League, a powerful conservative women's organisation, also merged with the new party. A conservative youth group Menzies had set up, the Young Nationalists, was also merged into the new party. It became the nucleus of the Liberal Party's youth division, the Young Liberals. By September 1945 there were more than 90,000 members, many of whom had not previously been members of any political party.

In New South Wales, the New South Wales division of the Liberal Party replaced the Liberal Democratic Party and Democratic Party between January and April 1945. In Queensland, the Queensland People's Party did not become part of the Liberal Party until July 1949, when it became the Queensland division of the Liberal Party.

=== Menzies era (1949–1966) ===
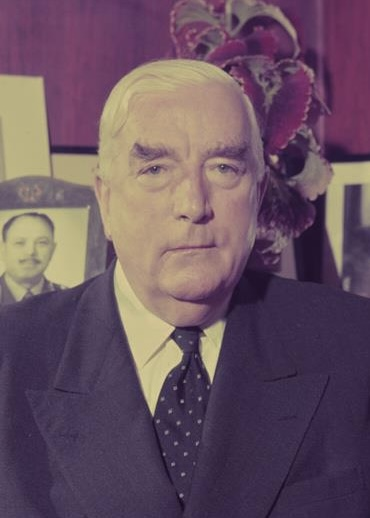
Sir Robert Menzies, founder of the Liberal Party and prime minister 1939–41 (UAP) and 1949–66

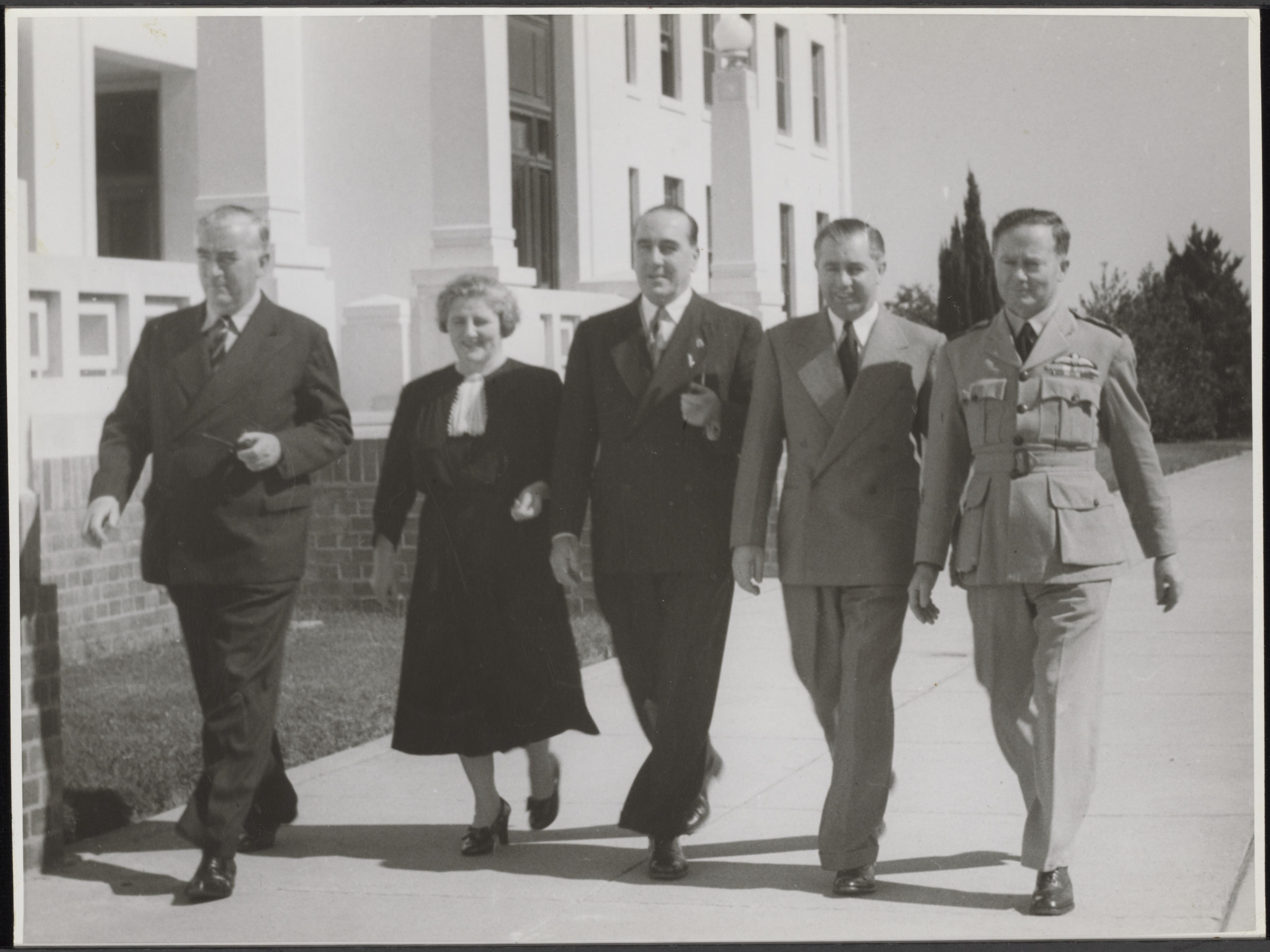
Sir Robert Menzies, Dame Enid Lyons (the first female member of an Australian Cabinet), Sir Eric Harrison, Harold Holt (Menzies' successor) and Tom White, in 1946.

After an initial loss to Labor at the 1946 election, Menzies led the Liberals to victory at the 1949 election, and the party stayed in office for a record 23 years—the longest unbroken run ever in government at the federal level. Australia experienced prolonged economic growth during the post-war boom period of the Menzies government (1949–66) and Menzies fulfilled his promises at the 1949 election to end rationing of butter, tea and petrol and provided a five-shilling endowment for first-born children, as well as for others. While Menzies himself was an unashamed Anglophile, his government concluded a number of major defence and trade treaties that set Australia on its post-war trajectory out of Britain's orbit; opened up Australia to multi-ethnic immigration; and instigated important legal reforms regarding Aboriginal Australians.

Menzies was strongly opposed to Labor's plans under Ben Chifley to nationalise the Australian banking system and, following victory at the 1949 election, secured a double dissolution election for April 1951, after the Labor-controlled Senate rejected his banking legislation. The Liberal-Country Coalition was returned with control of the Senate. The Government was re-elected again at the 1954 election; the formation of the anti-Communist Democratic Labor Party (DLP) and the consequent split in the Australian Labor Party early in 1955 helped the Liberals to secure another victory in December 1955. John McEwen replaced Arthur Fadden as leader of the Country Party in March 1958 and the Menzies-McEwen Coalition was returned again at elections in November 1958—their third victory against Labor's H. V. Evatt. The Coalition was narrowly returned against Labor's Arthur Calwell in the December 1961 election, in the midst of a credit squeeze. Menzies stood for office for the last time at the November 1963 election, again defeating Calwell, with the Coalition winning back its losses in the House of Representatives. Menzies went on to resign from parliament on 26 January 1966.

Menzies came to power the year the Communist Party of Australia had led a coal strike to improve pit miners' working conditions. That same year Joseph Stalin's Soviet Union exploded its first atomic bomb, and Mao Zedong led the Chinese Communist Party (CCP) to power in China; a year later came the invasion of South Korea by Communist North Korea. Anti-Communism was a key political issue of the 1950s and 1960s. Menzies was firmly anti-Communist; he committed troops to the Korean War and attempted to ban the Communist Party of Australia in an unsuccessful referendum during the course of that war. The Labor Party split over concerns about the influence of the Communist Party over the trade union movement, leading to the foundation of the breakaway Democratic Labor Party whose preferences supported the Liberal and Country parties.

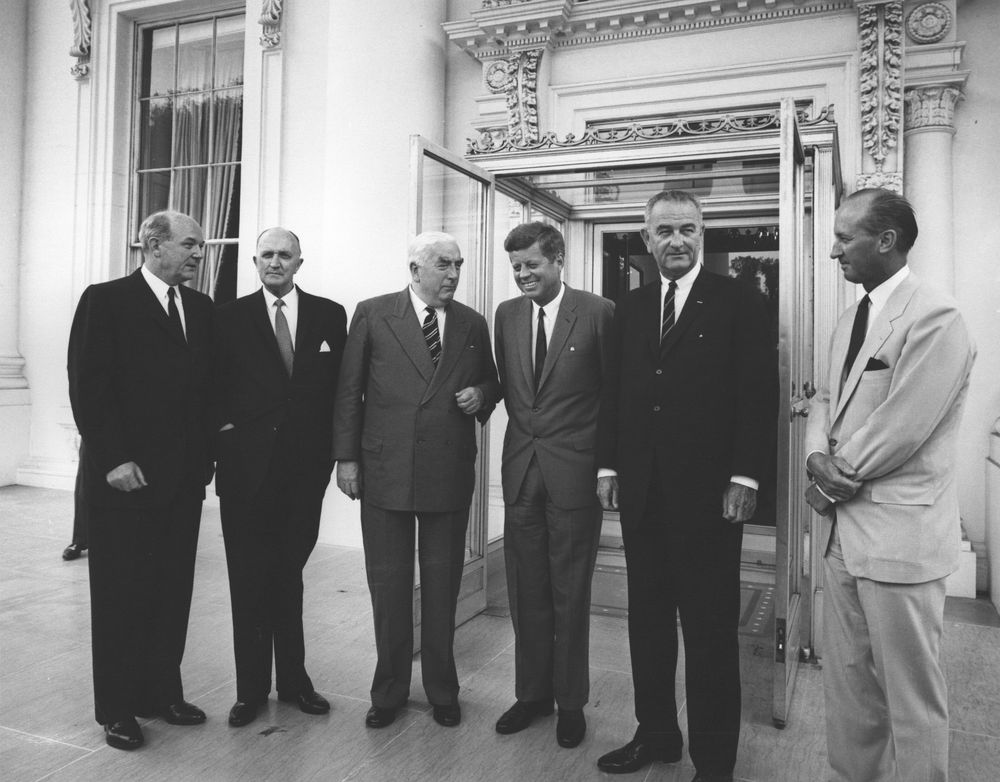
Menzies attending a White House luncheon in his honour with US president John F. Kennedy and his vice president Lyndon B. Johnson on 8 July 1963.

In 1951, during the early stages of the Cold War, Menzies spoke of the possibility of a looming third world war. The Menzies government entered Australia's first formal military alliance outside of the British Commonwealth with the signing of the ANZUS Treaty between Australia, New Zealand and the United States in San Francisco in 1951. External Affairs Minister Percy Spender had put forward the proposal to work along similar lines to the NATO Alliance. The Treaty declared that any attack on one of the three parties in the Pacific area would be viewed as a threat to each, and that the common danger would be met in accordance with each nation's constitutional processes. In 1954, the Menzies government signed the South East Asia Collective Defence Treaty (SEATO) as a South East Asian counterpart to NATO. That same year, Soviet diplomat Vladimir Petrov and his wife defected from the Soviet embassy in Canberra, revealing evidence of Russian spying activities; Menzies called a Royal Commission to investigate.

In 1956, a committee headed by Sir Keith Murray was established to inquire into the financial plight of Australia's universities, and Menzies injected funds into the sector under conditions which preserved the autonomy of universities.

Menzies continued the expanded immigration programme established under Chifley, and took important steps towards dismantling the White Australia Policy. In the early-1950s, external affairs minister Percy Spender helped to establish the Colombo Plan for providing economic aid to underdeveloped nations in Australia's region. Under that scheme many future Asian leaders studied in Australia. In 1958, the government replaced the Immigration Act's arbitrarily applied European language dictation test with an entry permit system, that reflected economic and skills criteria. In 1962, Menzies' Commonwealth Electoral Act provided that all Indigenous Australians should have the right to enrol and vote at federal elections (prior to this, indigenous people in Queensland, Western Australia and some in the Northern Territory had been excluded from voting unless they were ex-servicemen). In 1949, the Liberals appointed Dame Enid Lyons as the first woman to serve in an Australian Cabinet. Menzies remained a staunch supporter of links to the monarchy and British Commonwealth but formalised an alliance with the United States and concluded the Agreement on Commerce between Australia and Japan which was signed in July 1957 and launched post-war trade with Japan, beginning a growth of Australian exports of coal, iron ore and mineral resources that would steadily climb until Japan became Australia's largest trading partner.

Menzies retired in 1966 after serving 20 years in two separate stints, making him Australia's longest-serving prime minister in history. His second 17-year tenure is easily the longest unbroken tenure for a prime minister.

=== Transition and resurgence ===
==== Holt government (1966–1967) ====
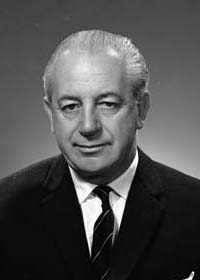
Harold Holt, Prime Minister 1966–67

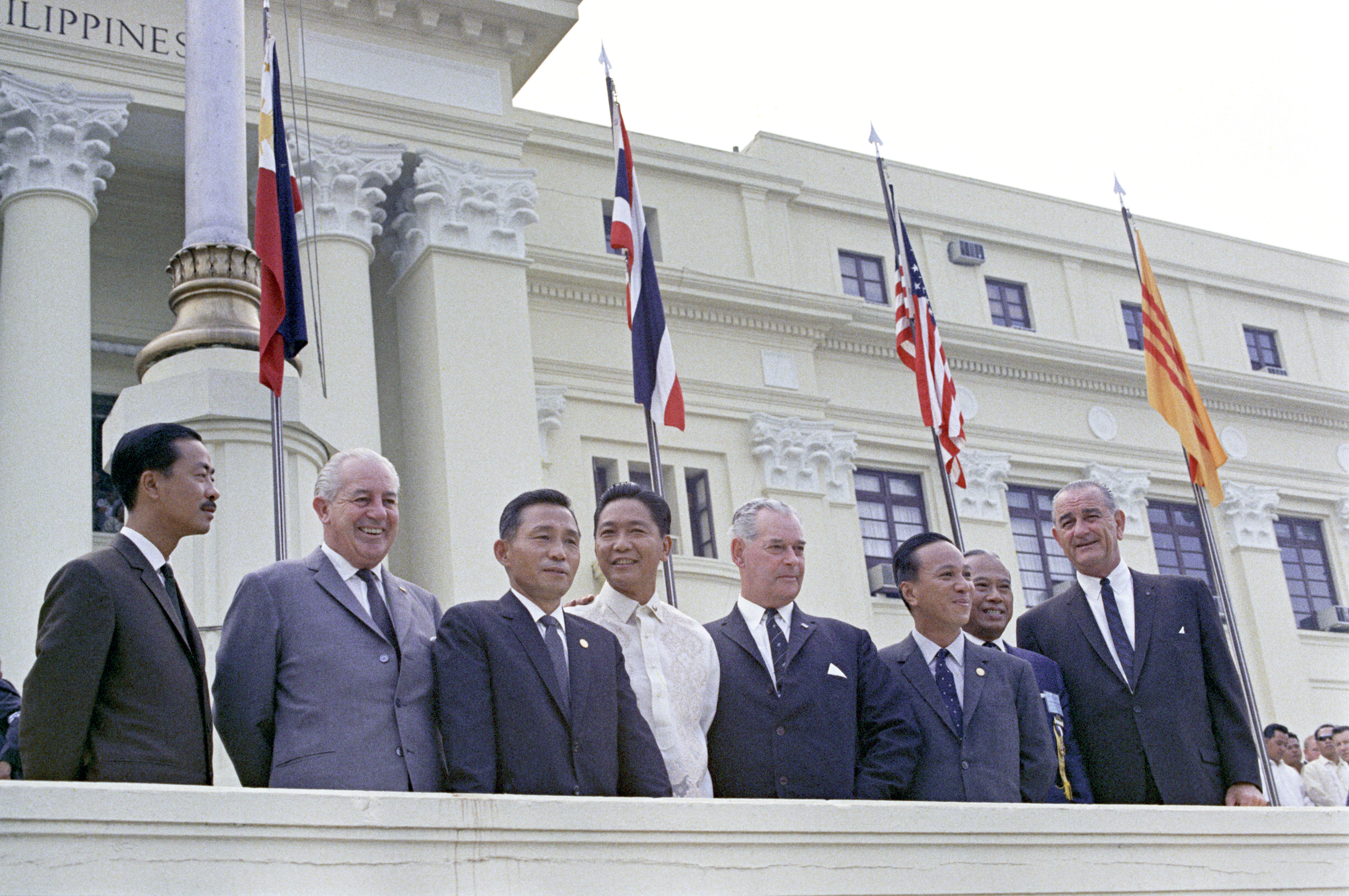
Prime Minister Harold Holt (second from left), attending the Manila Summit Conference in Manila, in 1966.

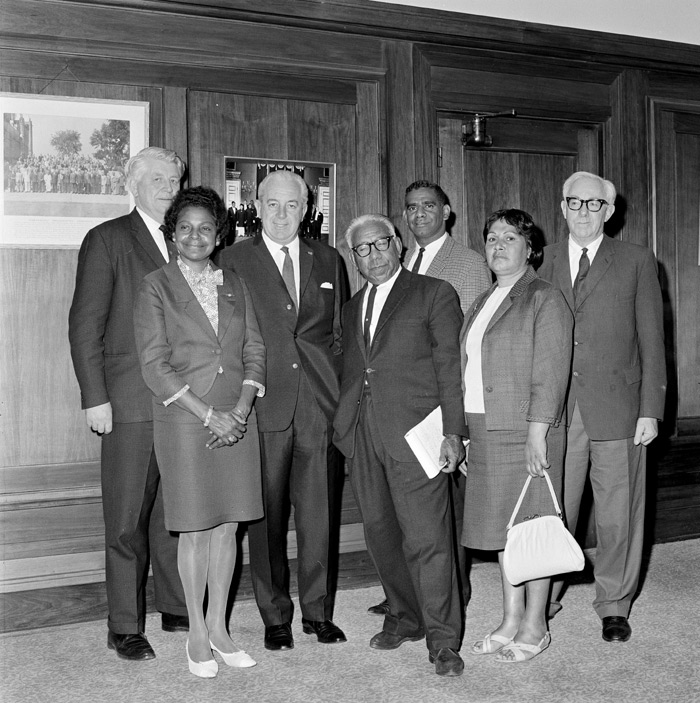
Harold Holt meeting with 1967 Referendum Aboriginal rights campaigners.

Harold Holt replaced the retiring Robert Menzies in 1966 and the Holt government went on to win 82 seats to Labor's 41 at the 1966 election. Holt remained prime minister until 19 December 1967, when he was declared presumed dead two days after disappearing in rough surf in which he had gone for a swim. His body has never been found.

Holt's ministerial appointments showed strong continuity with the Menzies era, though whilst Dame Enid Lyons had served as the first woman member of Cabinet under Menzies with an honorary role, it was Holt's first ministry that included Australia's first female minister, with Senator (later Dame) Annabelle Rankin serving as Minister for Housing.

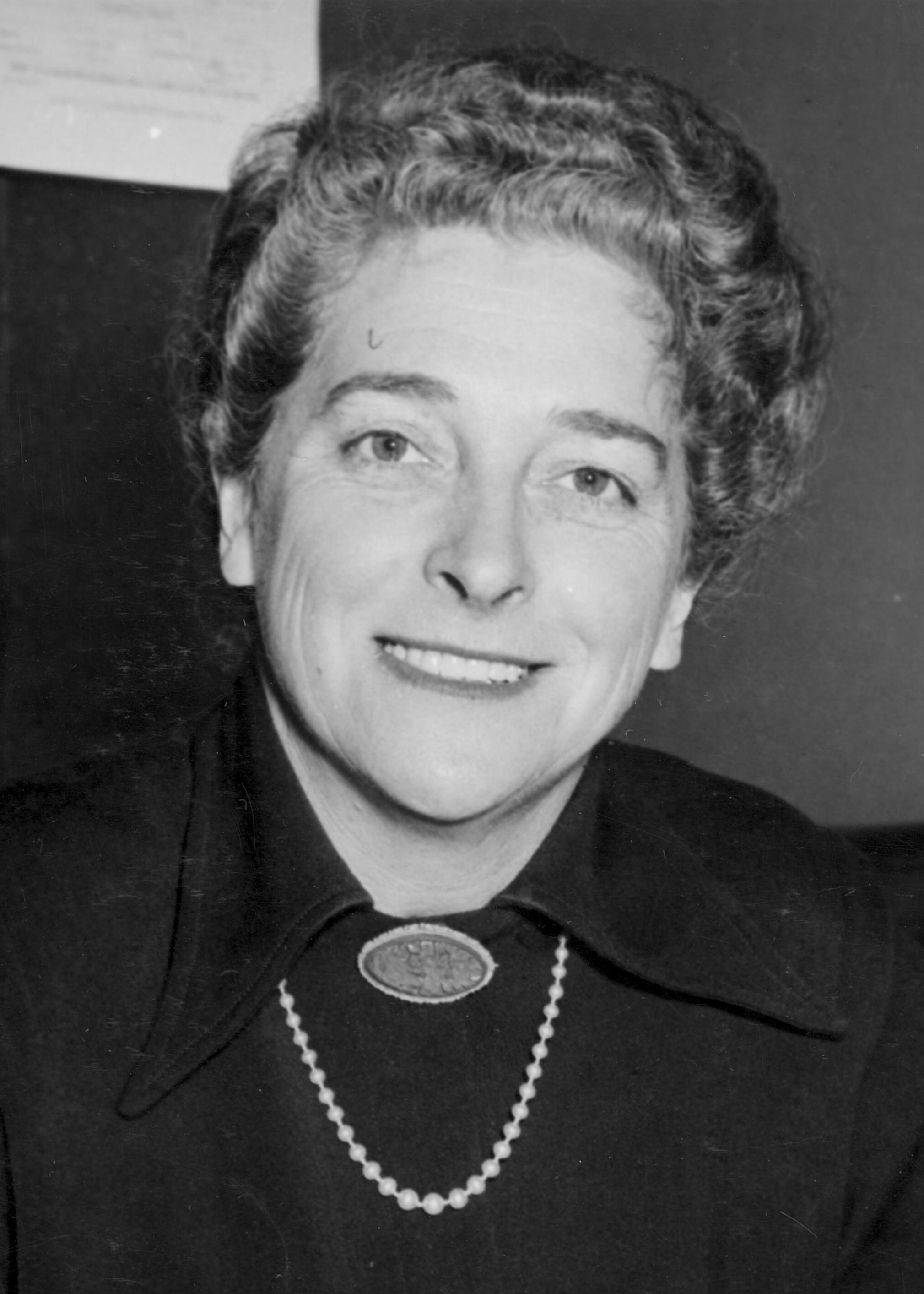
Senator Annabelle Rankin, the first female minister in Australian history.

Holt increased Australian commitment to the growing War in Vietnam, which met with some public opposition. His government oversaw conversion to decimal currency. Holt faced Britain's withdrawal from Asia by visiting and hosting many Asian leaders and by expanding ties to the United States, hosting the first visit to Australia by an American president, his friend Lyndon B. Johnson. Holt's government introduced the Migration Act 1966, which effectively dismantled the White Australia Policy and increased access to non-European migrants, including refugees fleeing the Vietnam War. By the end of 1967, the Liberals' initially popular support for the war in Vietnam was causing increasing public protest.

Holt also called the historic 1967 Referendum which transferred responsibility for Aboriginal Affairs to the Federal Parliament, and removed a discriminatory clause in the Australian Constitution excluding Indigenous Australians from the census. The referendum was one of the few to be overwhelmingly endorsed by the Australian electorate (over 90% voted "Yes"). Following the success of the referendum, Holt established an Office of Aboriginal Affairs under the prime minister's control, and set up the Council for Aboriginal Affairs, chaired by Reserve Bank of Australia Governor H. C. Coombs.

==== Gorton government (1968–1971) ====
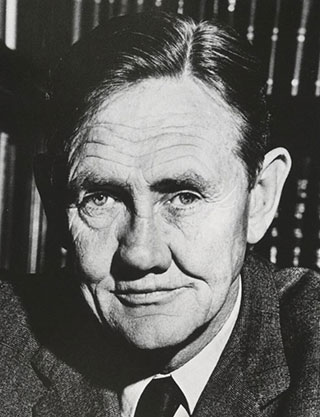
John Gorton, Prime Minister 1968–71

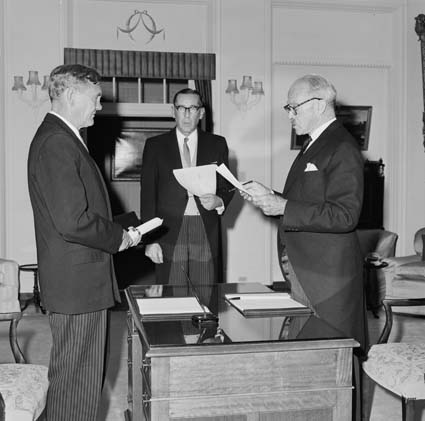
John Gorton being sworn in as prime minister by Lord Casey on 10 January 1968. Gorton led Australia into the tumultuous decade of the 1970s. Gorton declared himself "Australian to the bootheels" and increased funding for Australian cinema and arts to project a newly assertive Australian nationalism.

The Liberals chose John Gorton over Paul Hasluck to replace Holt, following a contentious ballot often described as the first modern political leadership contest in Australian history - and in doing so became the first and only Senator to become prime minister, though Gorton swiftly and successfully contested Holt's vacated House seat of Higgins. Gorton, a former World War II Royal Australian Air Force pilot, with a battle-scarred face, said he was "Australian to the bootheels" and had a personal style which often affronted some conservatives.

The Gorton government increased funding for the arts, setting up the Australian Council for the Arts, the Australian Film Development Corporation and the National Film and Television Training School - and in doing so playing a central role in helping re-establish the local Australian film industry. The Gorton government passed legislation establishing equal pay for men and women and increased pensions, allowances and education scholarships, as well as providing free health care to 250,000 of the nation's poor (but not universal health care). Additionally, the Gorton government established the Australian Industry Development Corporation and presided over the introduction of the metric system. In the field of foreign policy, Gorton maintained good relations with the United States and Britain but like Holt pursued closer ties with Asia. Though initially keeping Australia in the Vietnam War, Gorton held significant private reservations about the war and by the end of 1970 he had actively begun reducing Australia's commitment and stopped replacing troops once battalions had completed their tour of duty.

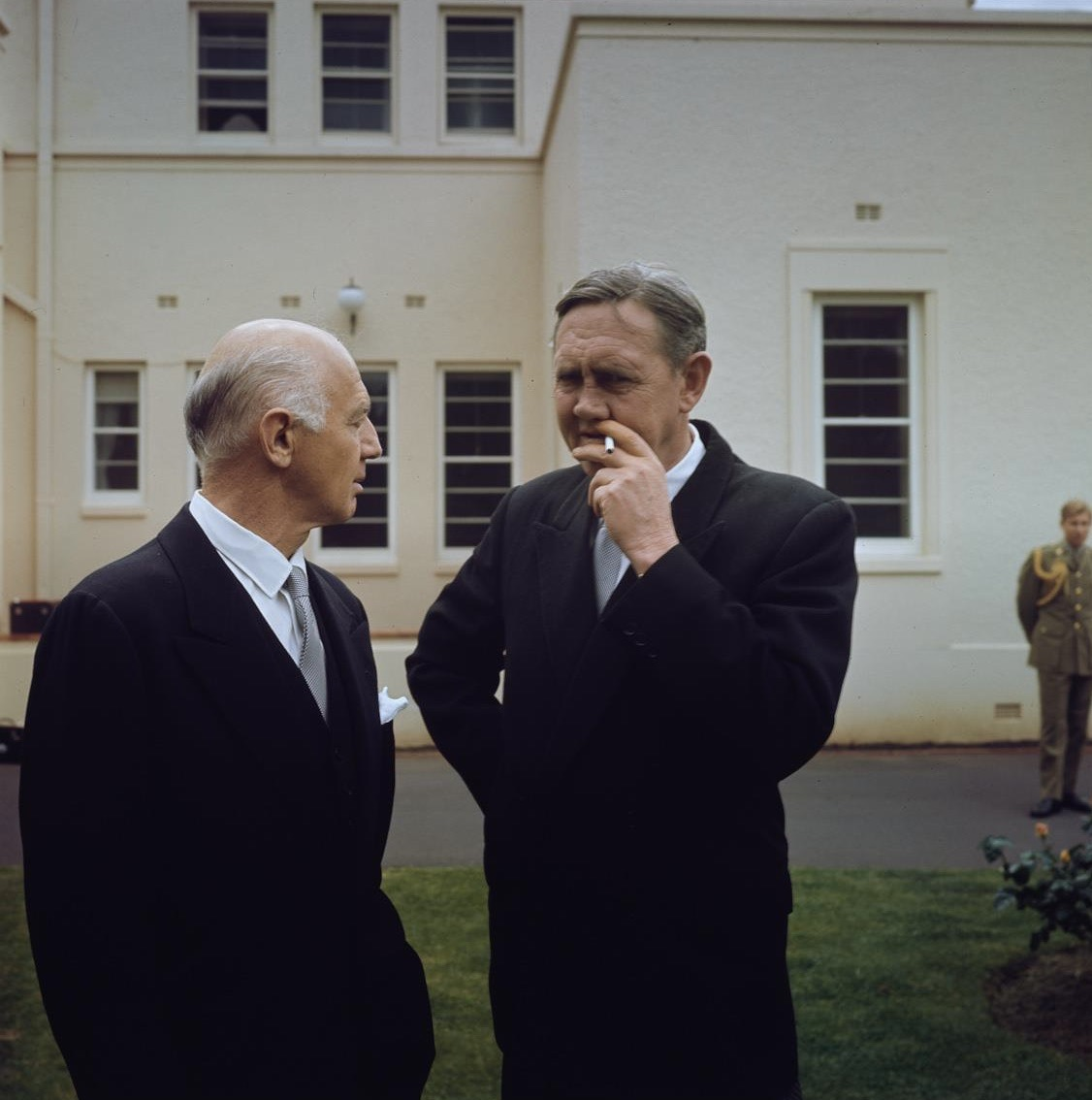
Gorton with his deputy William McMahon shortly after McMahon's unsuccessful leadership challenge, on 12 November 1969.

Following the success of the Holt Government's 1967 Referendum which had transferred powers for Aboriginal Affairs to the Federal Government, Gorton established the role of Minister for Aboriginal Affairs with Bill Wentworth serving as the "Minister in charge of Aboriginal Affairs under the Prime Minister". Gorton considered that the "primary aim" of government policy should be to "make Aboriginals self-supporting", and to end dependence on welfare and charity. The Government introduced the Aboriginal Study Grants Scheme (ABSTUDY) in 1969, as part of a commitment to assist Aboriginal and Torres Strait Islander people to attain better educational, social and economic outcomes, and in response to low participation of Indigenous Australians in higher education, and to promote participation in secondary education, the Aboriginal Secondary Grants Scheme (ABSEG) was established.

The Gorton government experienced a decline in voter support at the 1969 election. State Liberal leaders and internal party opponents saw his policies as too economically nationalist, centralist rather than federalist, and socially progressive - while other Liberals didn't like his personal behaviour. In 1971, Defence Minister Malcolm Fraser, resigned and said Gorton was "not fit to hold the great office of Prime Minister". In a vote on the leadership the Liberal Party split 50/50, and although this was insufficient to remove him as the leader, Gorton decided this was also insufficient support for him, and he resigned.

==== McMahon government and opposition (1971–1975) ====
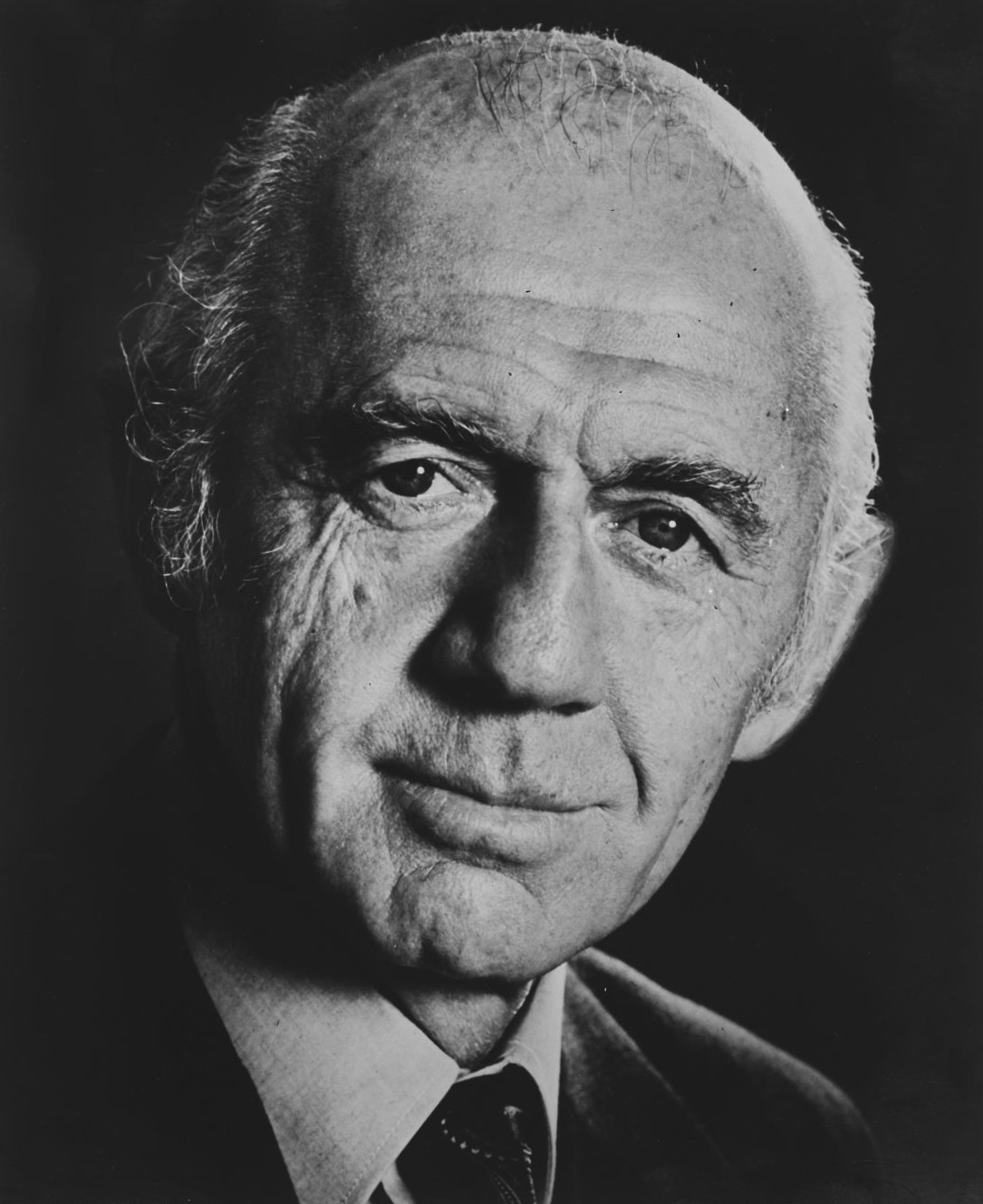
William McMahon, Prime Minister 1971–72

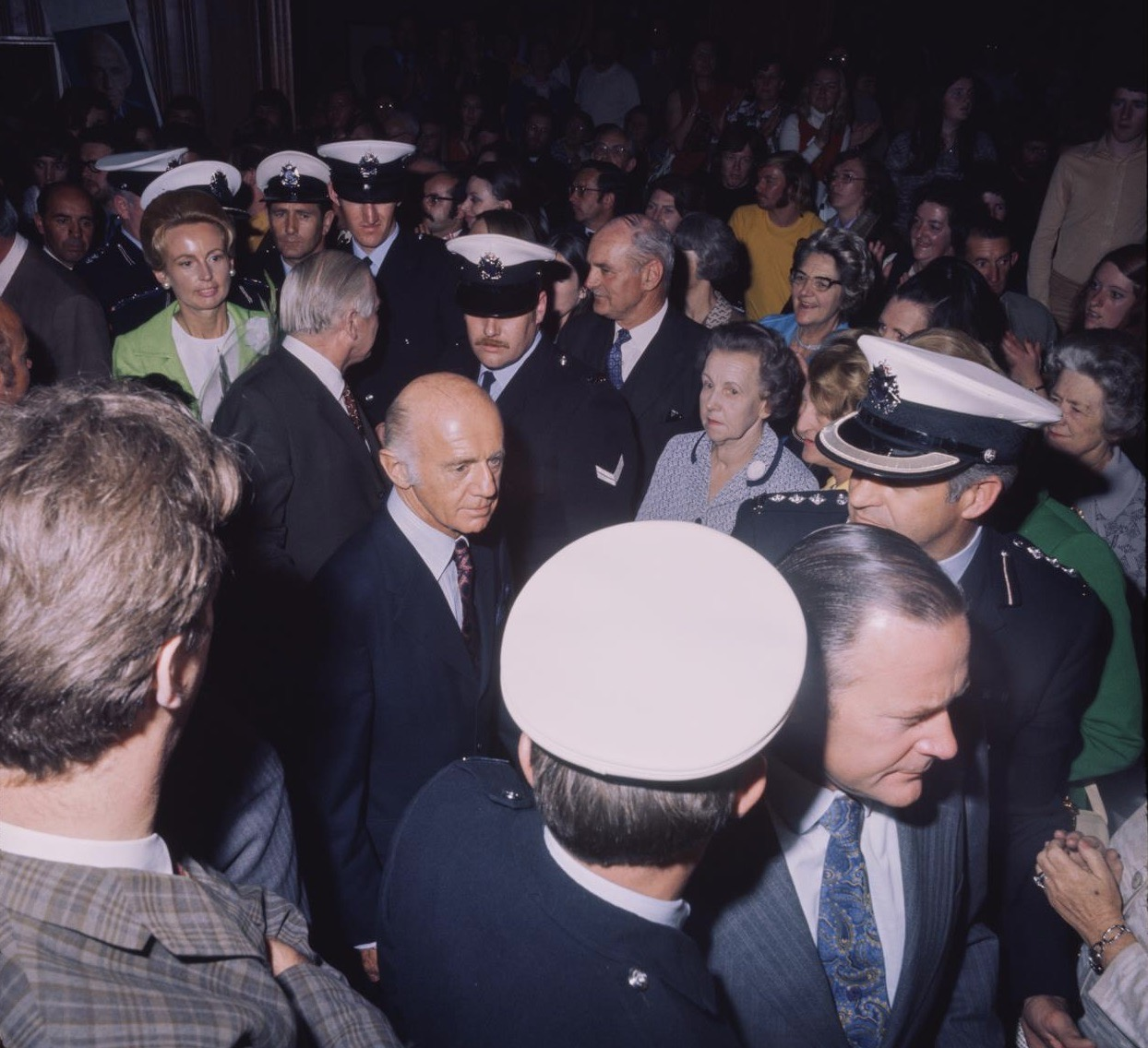
McMahon at a campaign rally in Springvale, Victoria on 23 November 1972, during the 1972 federal election

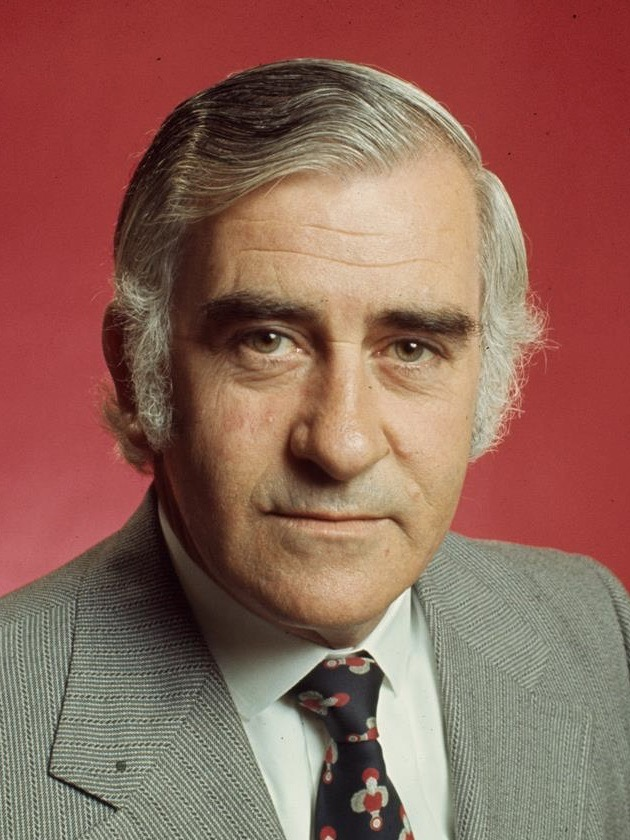
Billy Snedden, Opposition Leader 1972–75

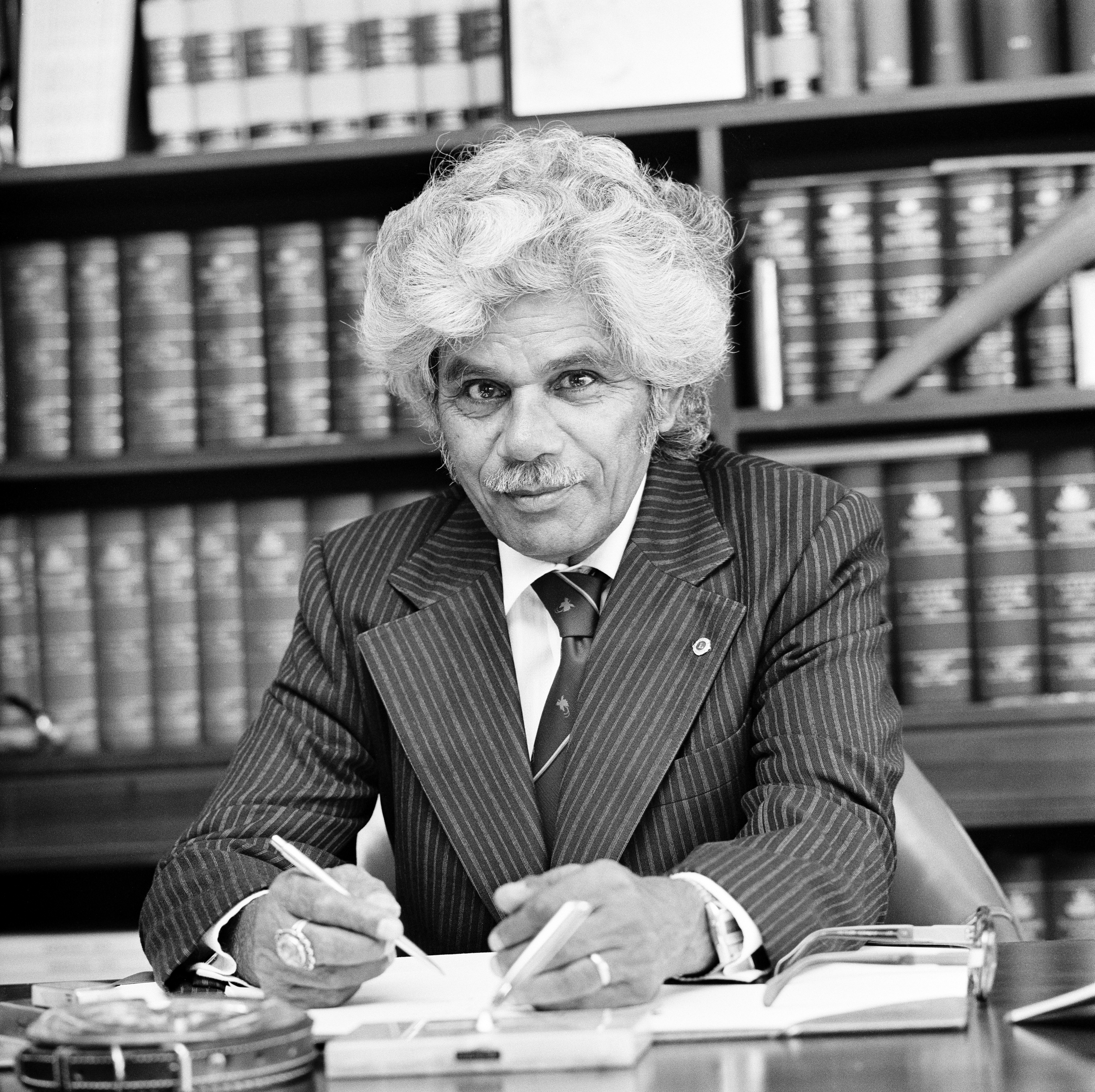
Senator Neville Bonner, the first Aboriginal Australian to sit in Federal Parliament.

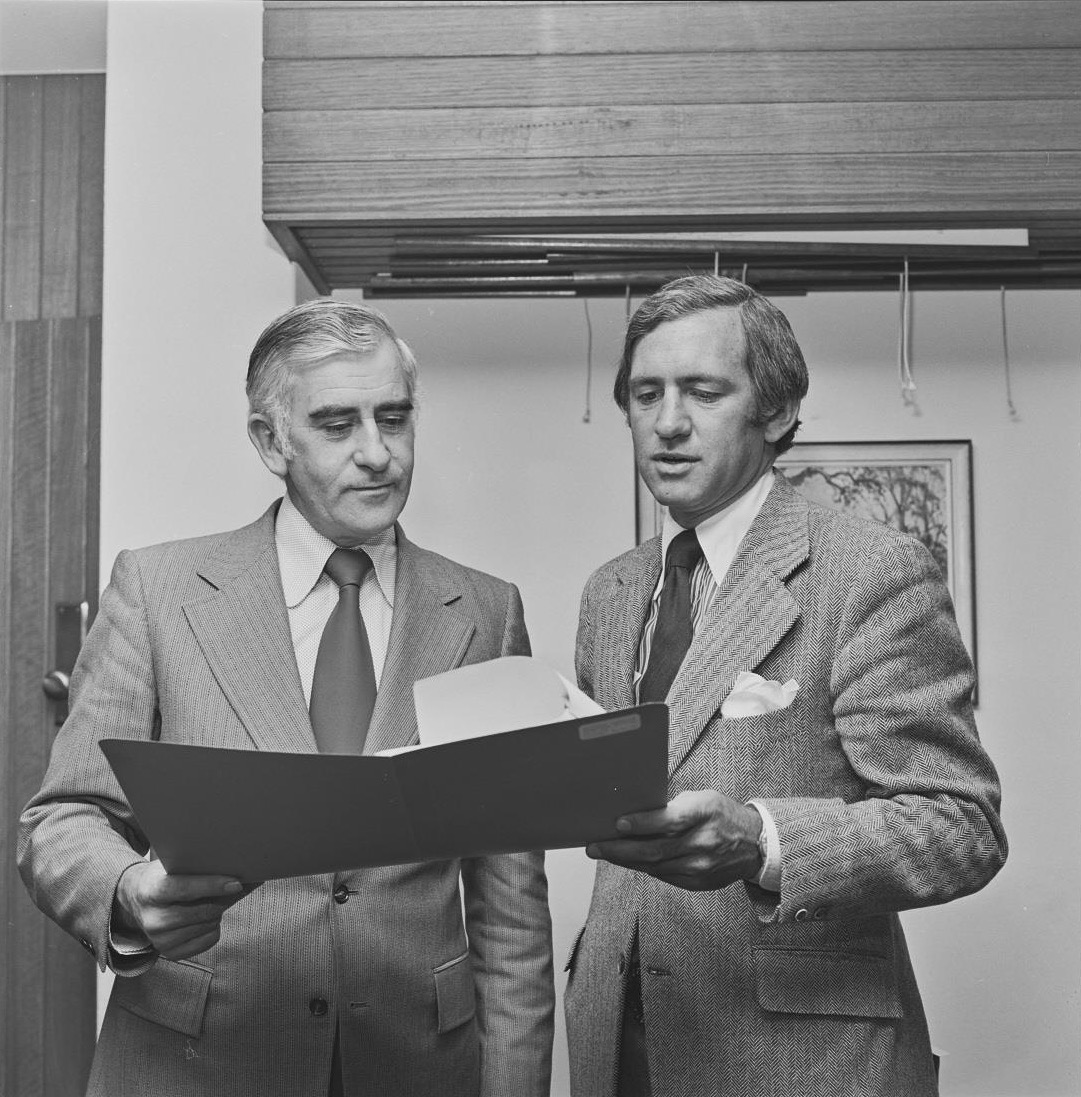
Billy Snedden and Andrew Peacock on 12 October 1973. They were the first two Liberal leaders who never got to serve as Prime Minister.

Foreign Affairs minister William McMahon replaced Gorton as prime minister. Gorton initially served as McMahon's deputy leader as well as defence minister, although Gorton would be forced to resign in August 1971 by McMahon on the grounds of "disloyalty". Treasurer Billy Snedden replaced Gorton as deputy and Fraser was reinstated into the ministry, although Fraser remained unpopular within Liberal ranks for some time over the events of March 1971; Gorton never forgave Fraser and never spoke to him again.

The economy was weakening as the post-war economic boom was drawing to a close. McMahon withdrew Australia's remaining combat troops from Vietnam, but criticised Opposition leader Gough Whitlam for visiting the communist People's Republic of China (PRC) in July 1971—only to have the US president Richard Nixon and his National Security Advisor Henry Kissinger announce a planned visit soon after.

During McMahon's period in office, Neville Bonner joined the Senate and became the first Indigenous Australian in the Australian Parliament. Bonner was chosen by the Liberal Party to fill a Senate vacancy in 1971 and celebrated his maiden parliamentary speech with a boomerang throwing display on the lawns of Parliament. Bonner went on to win election at the 1972 election and served as a Liberal Senator for 12 years. He worked on Indigenous and social welfare issues and proved an independent-minded senator, often crossing the floor on Parliamentary votes.

The McMahon government ended when Gough Whitlam led the Australian Labor Party out of its 23-year period in Opposition at the 1972 election. Following Whitlam's victory, John Gorton played a further role in reform in October 1973 by successfully moving a motion, seconded by Labor minister Moss Cass, which decriminalised homosexuality on a federal and territory level.

Billy Snedden defeated Nigel Bowen by one vote to succeed McMahon as Liberal leader and subsequently led the party against Whitlam in the 1974 federal election, which saw a return of the Labor government. After a series of gaffes that eroded his leadership authority and a perception that he was struggling to gain traction against Whitlam in the Parliament and with the public, Malcolm Fraser successfully challenged Snedden for the Liberal leadership on 21 March 1975. Upon Fraser's election, Gorton walked out of the Party Room, and quit the party shortly afterwards; he would go on to denounce the dismissal of the Whitlam Government, and endorsed and voted for Labor in the 1975 election.

==== Fraser government (1975–1983) ====
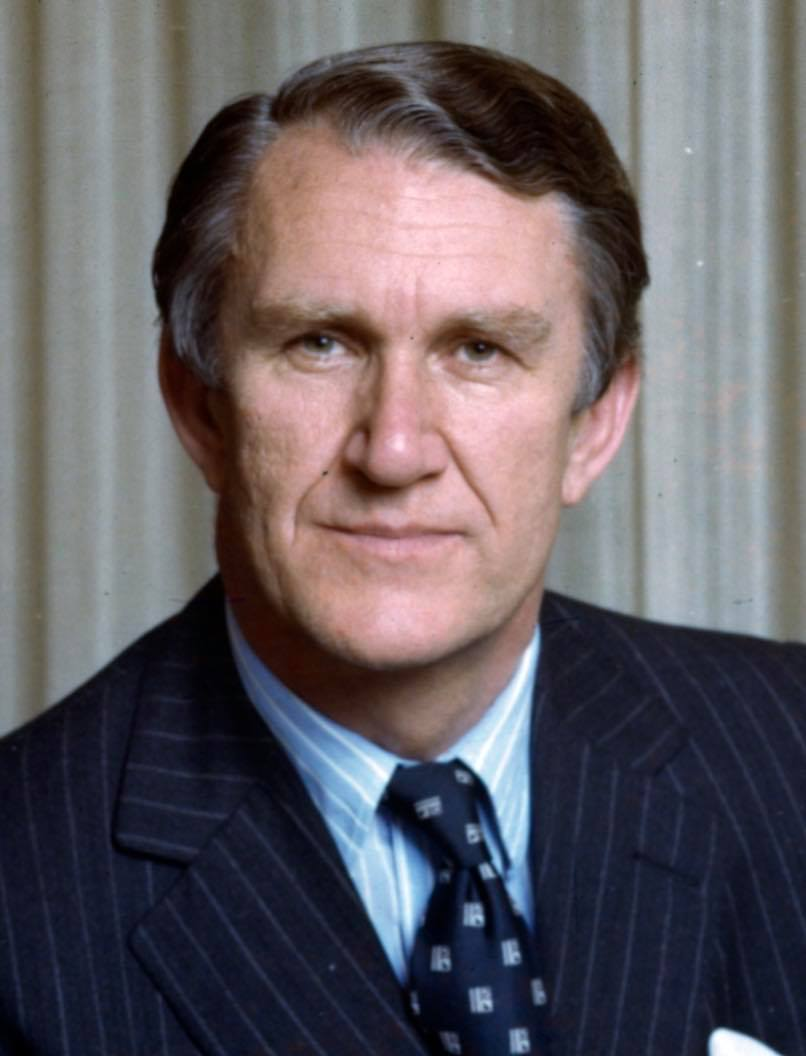
Malcolm Fraser, Prime Minister 1975–83

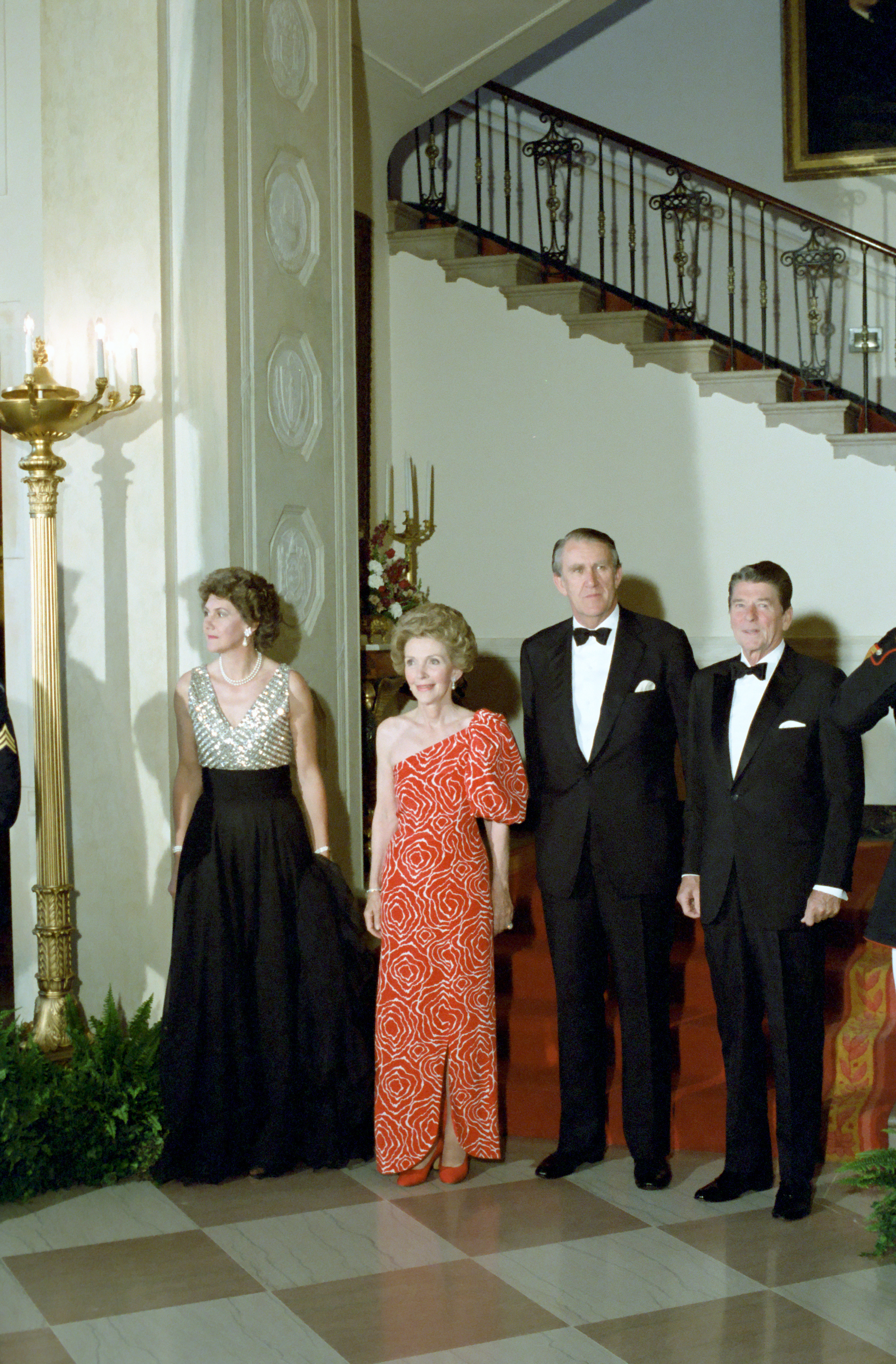
Prime Minister Malcolm Fraser (second right) and Tamie Fraser (left) with US president Ronald Reagan and Nancy at the White House in 1982. Fraser came to power amidst the divisive 1975 Australian constitutional crisis, but went on to lead Australia into the 1980s.

Following the 1974–75 Loans Affair, the Malcolm Fraser-led Liberal-Country Party Coalition argued that the Whitlam government was incompetent and so delayed passage of the Government's money bills in the Senate, until the government would promise a new election. Whitlam refused, yet Fraser insisted, leading to the divisive 1975 Australian constitutional crisis. The deadlock came to an end when the Whitlam government was controversially dismissed by the governor-general, Sir John Kerr on 11 November 1975 and Fraser was installed as caretaker prime minister, pending an election. Fraser won in a landslide at the resulting 1975 election.

Fraser maintained some of the social reforms of the Whitlam era, while seeking increased fiscal restraint. His majority included the first Aboriginal federal parliamentarian, Neville Bonner. In 1976, Parliament passed the Aboriginal Land Rights Act 1976, which, while limited to the Northern Territory, affirmed "inalienable" freehold title to some traditional lands:

The Australian Government grants Aboriginal land that can be successfully claimed under inalienable freehold title. This communal form of title cannot be bought, sold or mortgaged…"

The Fraser government also established the multicultural broadcaster SBS, accepted Vietnamese refugees, opposed minority white rule in apartheid South Africa and Rhodesia and opposed Soviet expansionism, but Liberal minister Don Chipp split off from the party to form a new centrist-social liberal party, the Australian Democrats in 1977.

The Liberals under Fraser won substantial majorities at the 1977 and 1980 elections, but a significant program of economic reform was never pursued. By 1983, the Australian economy was suffering with the early 1980s recession and amidst the effects of a severe drought. Fraser had promoted "states' rights" and his government refused to use Commonwealth powers to stop the construction of the Franklin Dam in Tasmania in 1982. Fraser had also been severely weakened by the 1981 resignation of Andrew Peacock from the ministry, and subsequent unsuccessful leadership challenge from Peacock on 8 April 1982 which also saw treasurer John Howard succeed Phillip Lynch as Fraser's deputy. The Liberal Party lost to the Bob Hawke-led Australian Labor Party in the 1983 election.

=== Internal division ===
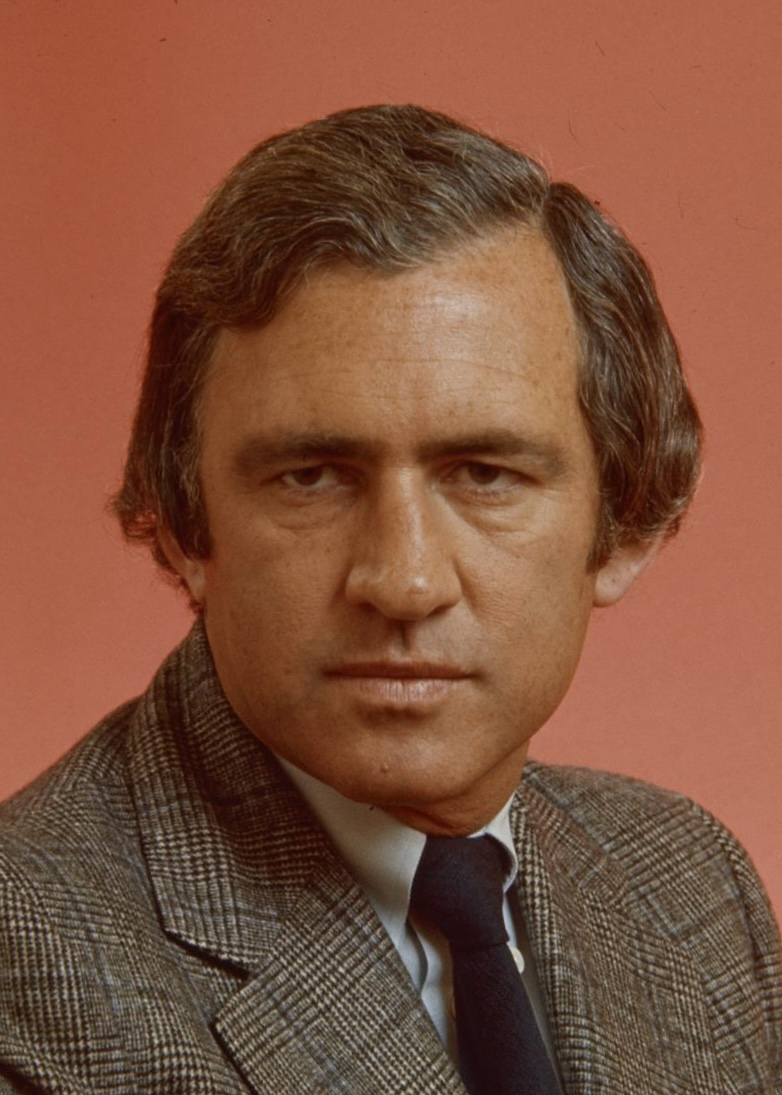
Andrew Peacock, Opposition Leader 1983–85, 1989–90

John Hewson, Opposition Leader 1990–94

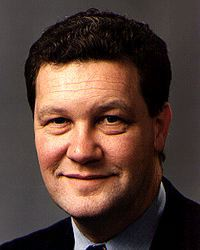
Alexander Downer, Opposition Leader 1994–95

A period of division for the Liberals followed, with former Treasurer John Howard competing with former foreign minister Andrew Peacock for supremacy. The Australian economy was facing the early 1990s recession. Unemployment reached 11.4% in 1992. Under Dr John Hewson, in November 1991, the opposition launched the 650-page Fightback! policy document—a radical collection of dry (economic liberal) measures including the introduction of a goods and services Tax (GST), various changes to Medicare including the abolition of bulk billing for non-concession holders, the introduction of a nine-month limit on unemployment benefits, various changes to industrial relations including the abolition of awards, a $13 billion personal income tax cut directed at middle and upper income earners, $10 billion in government spending cuts, the abolition of state payroll taxes and the privatisation of a large number of government owned enterprises − representing the start of a very different future direction to the keynesian economic policies practised by previous Liberal/National Coalition governments.

The 15 percent GST was the centrepiece of the policy document. Through 1992, Labor Prime Minister Paul Keating mounted a campaign against the Fightback package, and particularly against the GST, which he described as an attack on the working class in that it shifted the tax burden from direct taxation of the wealthy to indirect taxation as a broad-based consumption tax. Pressure group activity and public opinion was relentless, which led Hewson to exempt food from the proposed GST—leading to questions surrounding the complexity of what food was and wasn't to be exempt from the GST. Hewson's difficulty in explaining this to the electorate was exemplified in the infamous birthday cake interview, considered by some as a turning point in the election campaign. Keating won a record fifth consecutive Labor term at the 1993 election. A number of the proposals were later adopted into law in some form, to a small extent during the Keating Labor government, and to a larger extent during the Howard Liberal government (most famously the GST), while unemployment benefits and bulk billing were re-targeted for a time by the Abbott Liberal government.

=== Howard era (1995–2007) ===
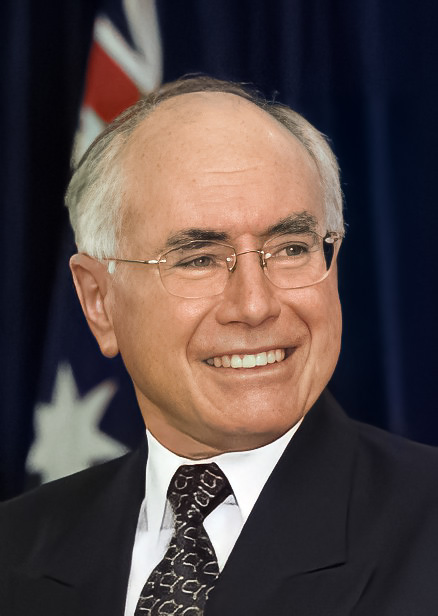
John Howard, Prime Minister 1996–2007

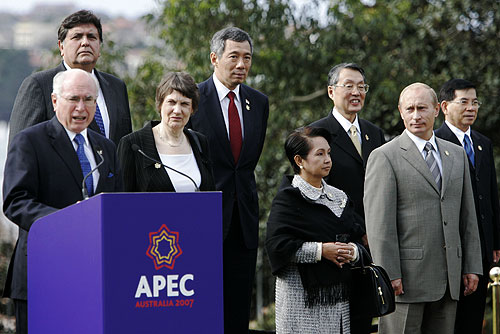
Prime Minister John Howard with APEC leaders in Sydney in 2007. Howard supported the traditional icons of Australian identity and its international allegiances, but oversaw booming trade with Asia and increased non-European immigration.

Labor's Paul Keating lost the 1996 Election to the Liberals' John Howard. The Liberals had been in Opposition for exactly 13 years. John Howard was sworn in as prime minister on 11 March, the 13th anniversary of the Liberals entering opposition following the swearing in of Bob Hawke. With Howard as prime minister, Peter Costello as treasurer and Alexander Downer as foreign minister, the Howard government remained in power until their electoral defeat to Kevin Rudd in 2007.

Howard generally framed the Liberals as being conservative on social policy, debt reduction and matters like maintaining Commonwealth links and the American Alliance but his premiership saw booming trade with Asia and expanding multiethnic immigration. His government concluded the Australia-United States Free Trade Agreement with the Bush administration in 2004. Howard's premiership coincided with Al Qaeda's 11 September attacks on the United States. The Howard government invoked the ANZUS treaty in response to the attacks and supported America's campaigns in Afghanistan and Iraq.

Howard differed from his Labor predecessor Paul Keating in that he supported traditional Australian institutions like the monarchy in Australia, the commemoration of ANZAC Day and the design of the Australian flag, but like Keating he pursued privatisation of public utilities and the introduction of a broad based consumption tax (although Keating had dropped support for a GST by the time of his 1993 election victory). Howard convened the 1998 Australian Constitutional Convention to discuss whether Australia should become a republic and called a referendum in 1999, which saw the minimalist republican model endorsed by the convention rejected by voters. Howard did not support the republic, but proposed a new preamble to the Constitution that began by expressing hope in God and went on to "honour" Aboriginal and Torres Islander peoples "for their deep kinship with their lands and for their ancient and continuing cultures which enrich the life of our country..." This proposed preamble was also voted down in the referendum.

In the 2004 federal elections the party strengthened its majority in the lower house and, with its coalition partners, became the first federal government in twenty years to gain an absolute majority in the Senate. This control of both houses permitted their passing of legislation without the need to negotiate with independents or minor parties, exemplified by industrial relations legislation known as WorkChoices, a wide-ranging effort to increase deregulation of industrial laws in Australia.

In 2005, Howard reflected on his government's cultural and foreign policy outlook in oft repeated terms:

When I became Prime Minister nine years ago, I believed that this nation was defining its place in the world too narrowly. My Government has rebalanced Australia's foreign policy to better reflect the unique intersection of history, geography, culture and economic opportunity that our country represents. Time has only strengthened my conviction that we do not face a choice between our history and our geography.

The 2007 federal election saw the defeat of the Howard federal government, and the Liberal Party was in opposition throughout Australia at the state and federal level; the highest Liberal office-holder at the time was Lord Mayor of Brisbane Campbell Newman. This ended after the 2008 Western Australian state election, when Colin Barnett became premier of that state.

=== Modern day ===
==== Opposition (2007–2013) ====
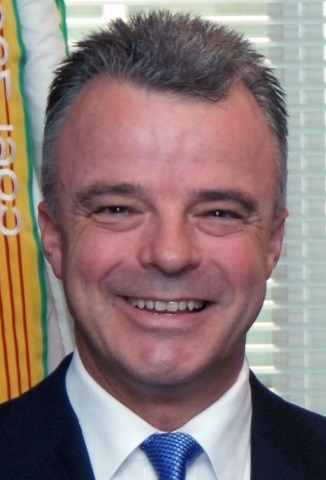
Brendan Nelson, Opposition Leader 2007–08

Following the 2007 federal election, Brendan Nelson was elected leader by the Parliamentary Liberal Party. On 16 September 2008, in a second contest following a spill motion, Nelson lost the leadership to Malcolm Turnbull by a margin of 4 votes (41 to 45). On 1 December 2009, a subsequent leadership election saw Turnbull lose the leadership to Tony Abbott by one vote (42 to 41) on the second ballot. Abbott led the party to the 2010 federal election, which saw the Coalition vote (opposition) equalling the Labor Vote (government), resulting in the first hung parliament since the 1940 election.

Through 2010, the party remained in opposition at the Tasmanian and South Australian state elections and achieved state government in Victoria. In March 2011, the New South Wales Liberal-National Coalition led by Barry O'Farrell won government with the largest election victory in post-war Australian history at the State Election. In Queensland, the Liberal and National parties merged in 2008 to form the new Liberal National Party of Queensland (registered as the Queensland Division of the Liberal Party of Australia). In March 2012, the new party achieved Government in an historic landslide, led by former Brisbane Lord Mayor, Campbell Newman.

In March 2013, the Western Australian Liberal-National government won re-election, and Tony Abbott led the party to government at the 2013 Australian federal election. As of 2025, The 2013 federal election was the most recent election the Liberal party and the Coalition saw an increase in the First preference vote in the House of Representatives.

==== Abbott government (2013–2015) ====
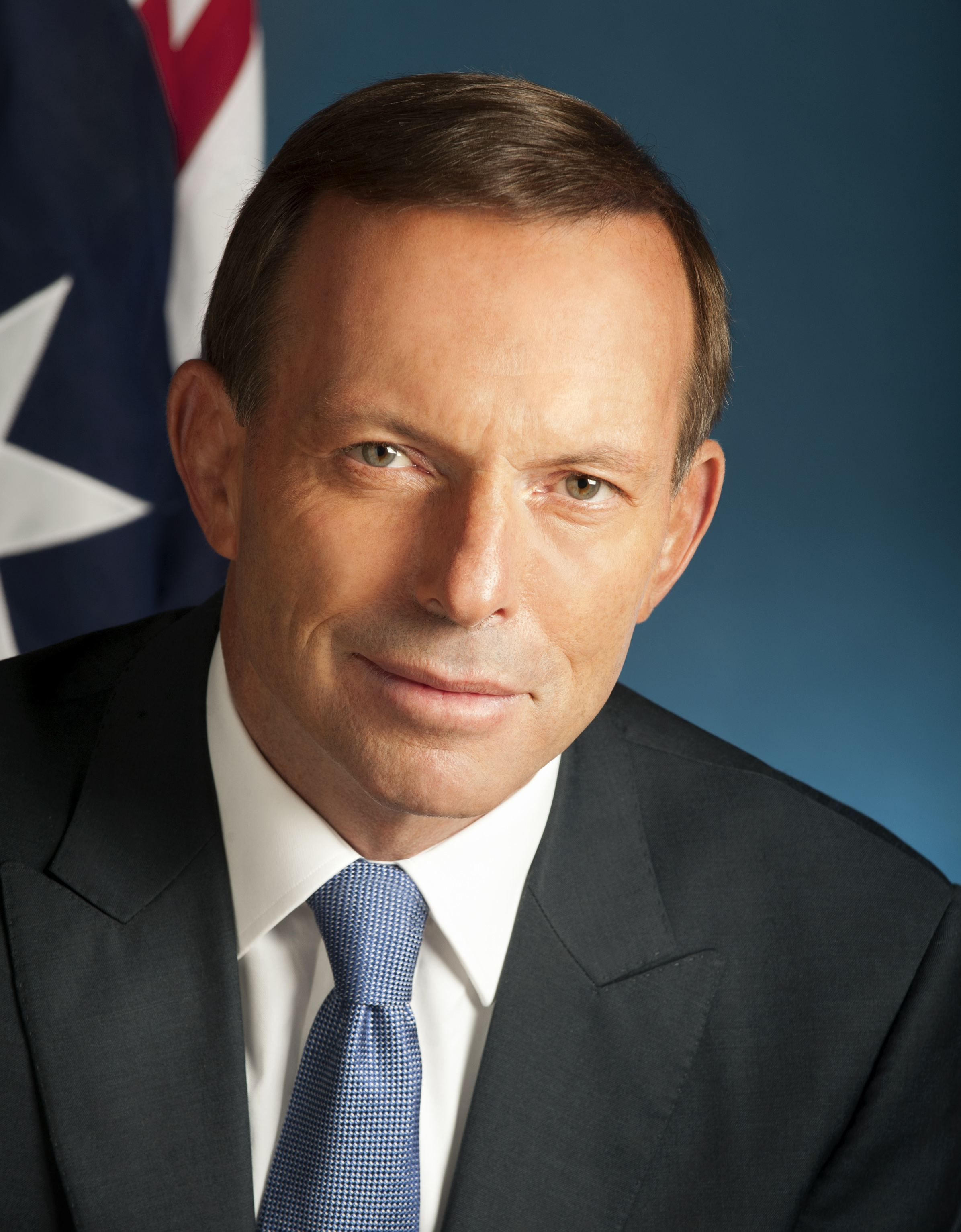
Tony Abbott

In economic policy, the Abbott government aimed to rein in a budget deficit that reached A$48.5 billion by June 2014. It concluded free trade agreements with China, Japan and South Korea. It removed the Rudd-Gillard era Resource Super Profits Tax and carbon pricing. It established the National Commission of Audit to advise on restoring the Budget to surplus; instituted the Royal Commission into Trade Union Governance and Corruption; founded the Medical Research Future Fund.

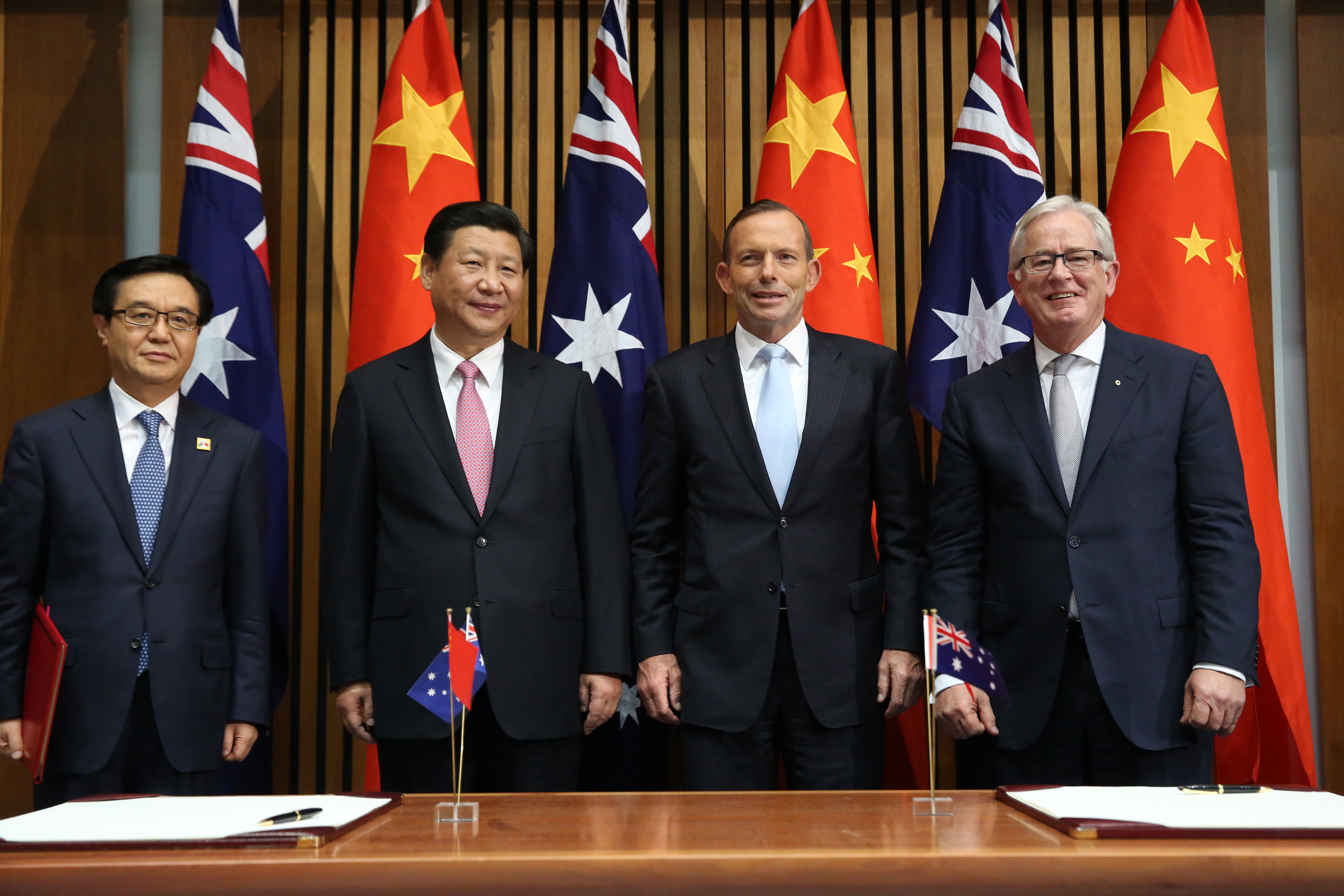
Prime Minister Abbott and Trade Minister Andrew Robb signing the Free Trade Agreement with Chinese leader Xi Jinping and Minister for Commerce Gao Hucheng.

Abbott campaigned in opposition and in office to halt the people smuggling trade, and unauthorised maritime arrivals ceased during his term of office under Operation Sovereign Borders. In foreign policy, Australia continued its military engagement in the Middle-East, amid the worsening Syrian conflict. In 2015, The Abbott government agreed to resettle an additional 12,000 refugees from the region. Abbott and Australia's first female foreign minister Julie Bishop challenged Russia at the United Nations over the shooting down of Malaysian Flight MH17 in Ukraine. The government launched the New Colombo Plan to encourage educational exchange with the Indo-Pacific region. Domestically, Abbott campaigned for recognition of Indigenous Australians in the Australian Constitution, flagging a referendum for 2017, and promised a plebiscite on the issue of same-sex marriage. Investments in air and road infrastructure were prioritised.

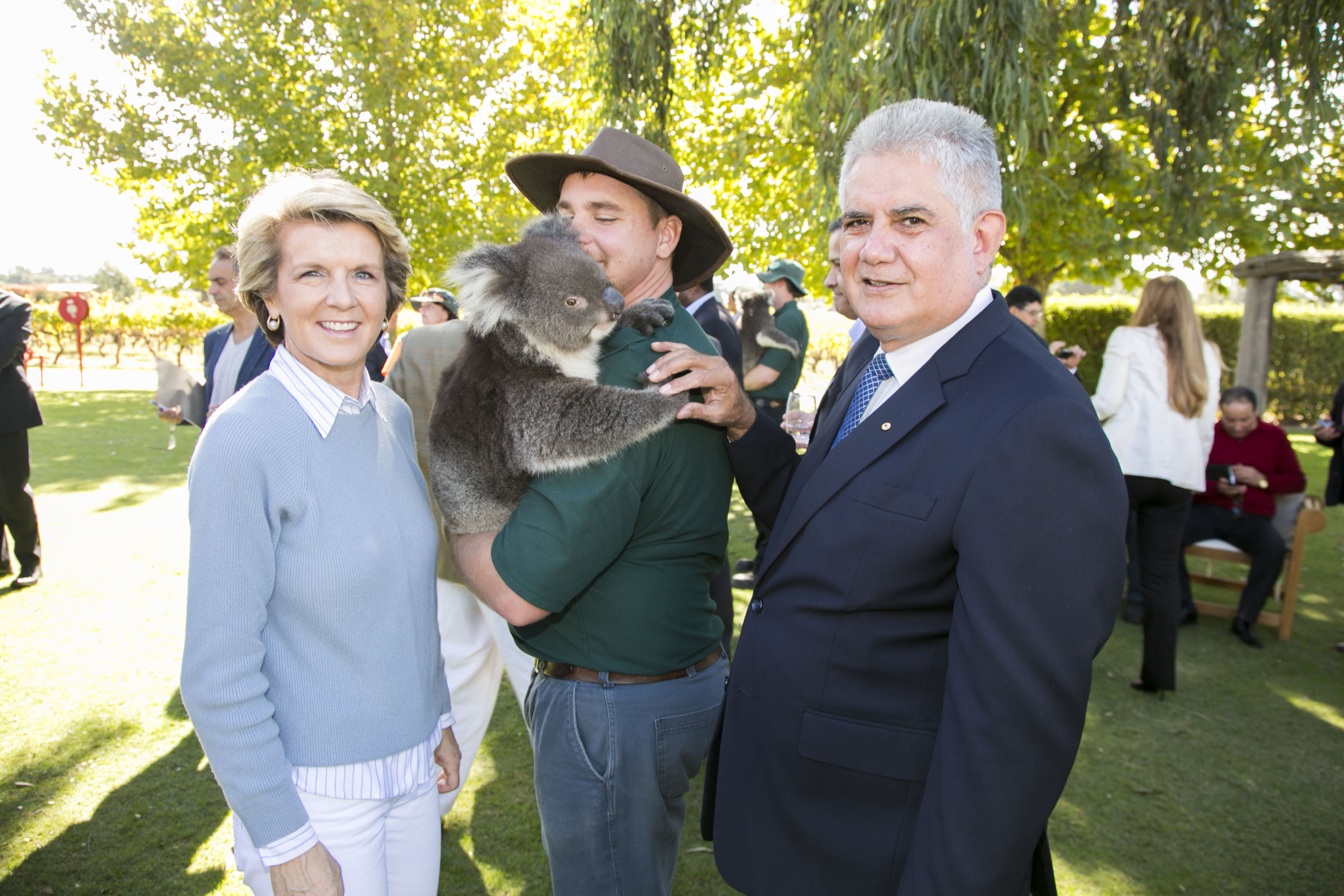
Australia's first female Foreign Minister Julie Bishop with the first Aboriginal Member of the House of Representatives (and later Minister) Ken Wyatt

Treasurer Joe Hockey delivered two Budgets, the first focused on expenditure reduction measures, but faced a hostile reception in the Senate and media. Partial deregulation of universities, and a $7 contribution to doctor visits were proposed, but blocked by the Senate. The second Budget emphasised stimulus for the small business sector. The Liberal Party faced Cabinet leaks and early leadership instability, after a poorly received first Budget and amid media criticism, with dissenters coalescing around Abbott's leadership rival Malcolm Turnbull.

Abbott became the shortest-serving Australian prime minister since William McMahon, when Turnbull launched a challenge and won a September 2015 internal leadership ballot. Turnbull famously cited 30 consecutive negative Newspoll results and "economic leadership" as reasons for mounting his challenge.

==== Turnbull government (2015–2018) ====
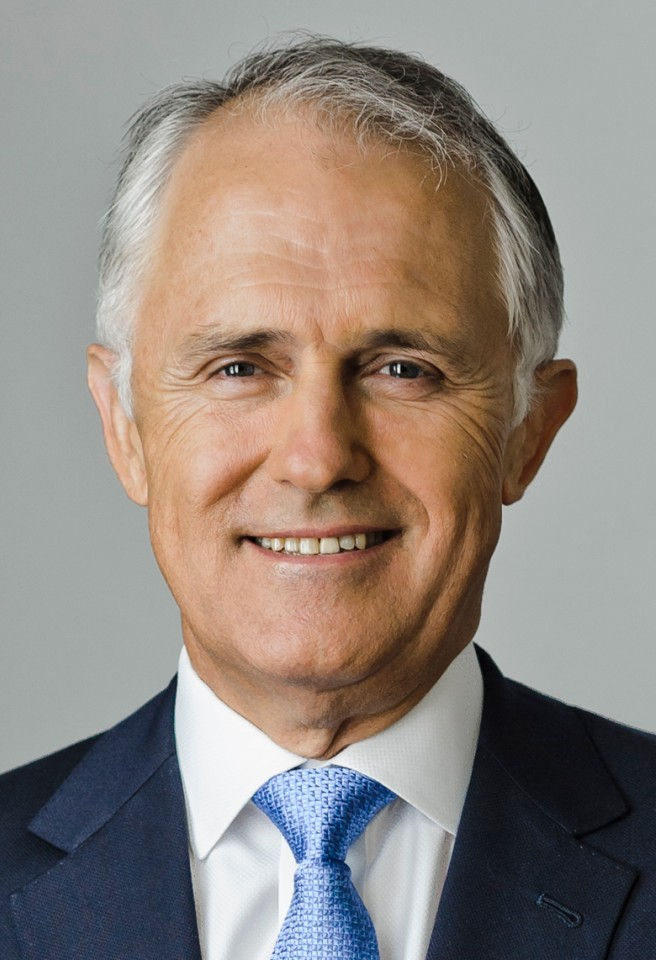
Malcolm Turnbull

Turnbull appointed Scott Morrison as Treasurer in an expanded ministry, promoting several key supporters. The Turnbull government continued a number of Abbott government initiatives, delivering a plebiscite approving legal recognition of same-sex marriage, and continuing initiatives on an anti-domestic violence campaign, funding the National Disability Insurance Scheme, signing the China free trade deal, and reforming Senate voting.

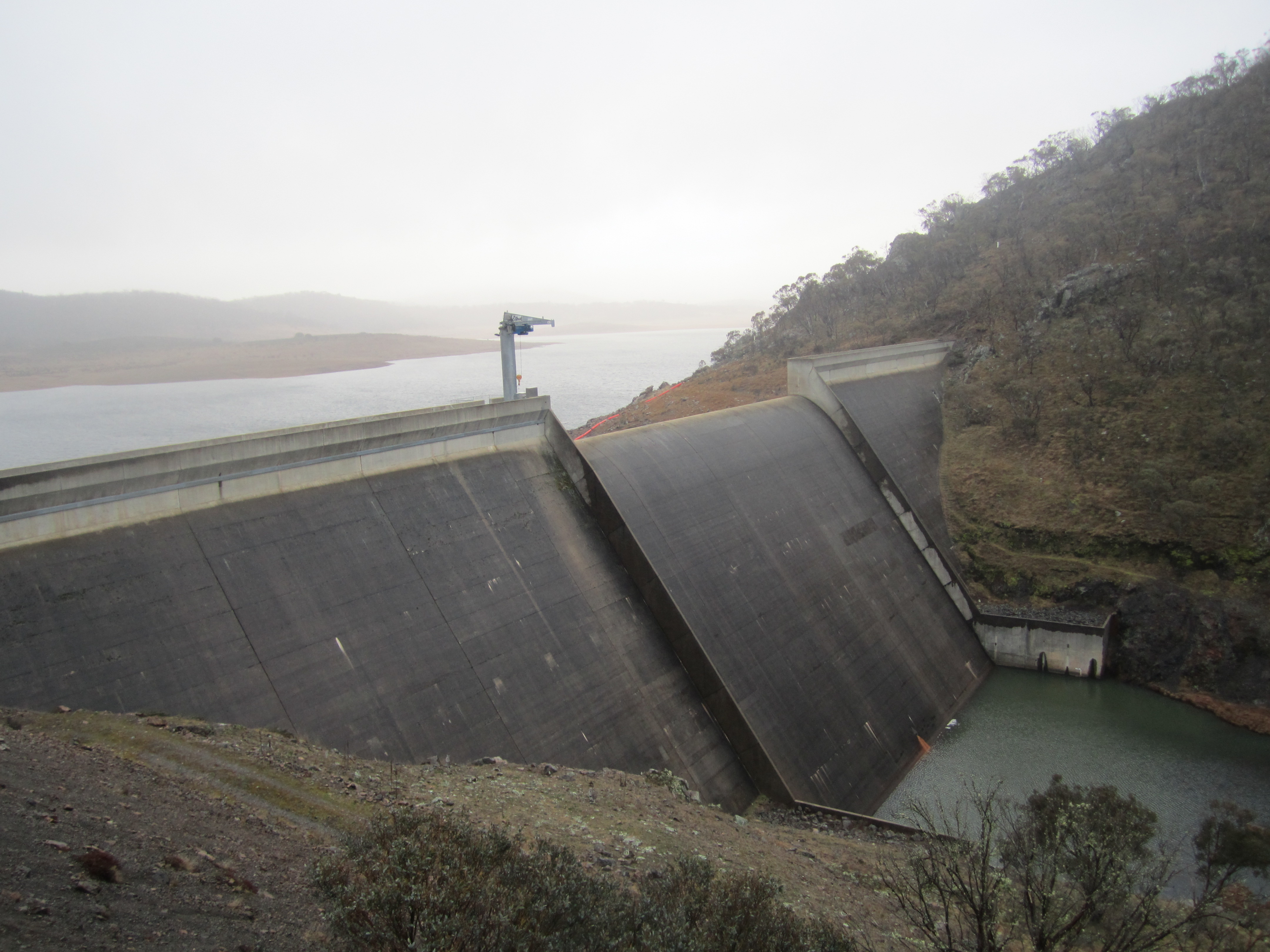
Tantangara Reservoir was identified for Snowy 2.0 Pumped Storage Power Station construction works by the Turnbull Government.

The April 2016 refusal of the Senate to pass the government's bill to re-establish Australian Building and Construction Commission provided Turnbull with a double dissolution trigger. An election was held on 2 July 2016, and the government was returned with its majority in the House of Representatives reduced to one seat. The now elected Turnbull government secured passage of the Registered Organisations and Australian Building and Construction Commission legislation. In 2017, it announced construction of the Snowy 2.0 Pumped Storage Power Station.

Turnbull's ousting of Abbott had divided the Liberal Party rank and file and tensions continued in the parliamentary Party. The government reached the 30-consecutive-Newspoll-losses benchmark Turnbull had used to unseat Abbott, in April 2018. By-election losses in July 2018 further diminished Turnbull's authority. On 21 August 2018, Turnbull announced a leadership spill ahead of his 39th consecutive Newspoll loss. Turnbull narrowly won in a party room vote against Home Affairs Minister Peter Dutton. Leadership tension continued, and the party voted to hold a second leadership ballot on 24 August, with Turnbull choosing not to stand. In that ballot, Treasurer Scott Morrison was seen as a compromise candidate, with backing from his own Centre-right faction, and the Moderate faction, led by Christopher Pyne. Consequently, Morrison defeated Foreign Minister Julie Bishop, and then Peter Dutton and his National Right faction to become leader of the Liberal Party. Morrison was elected as Turnbull's successor by 45 votes over Dutton with 40.

==== Morrison government (2018–2022) ====
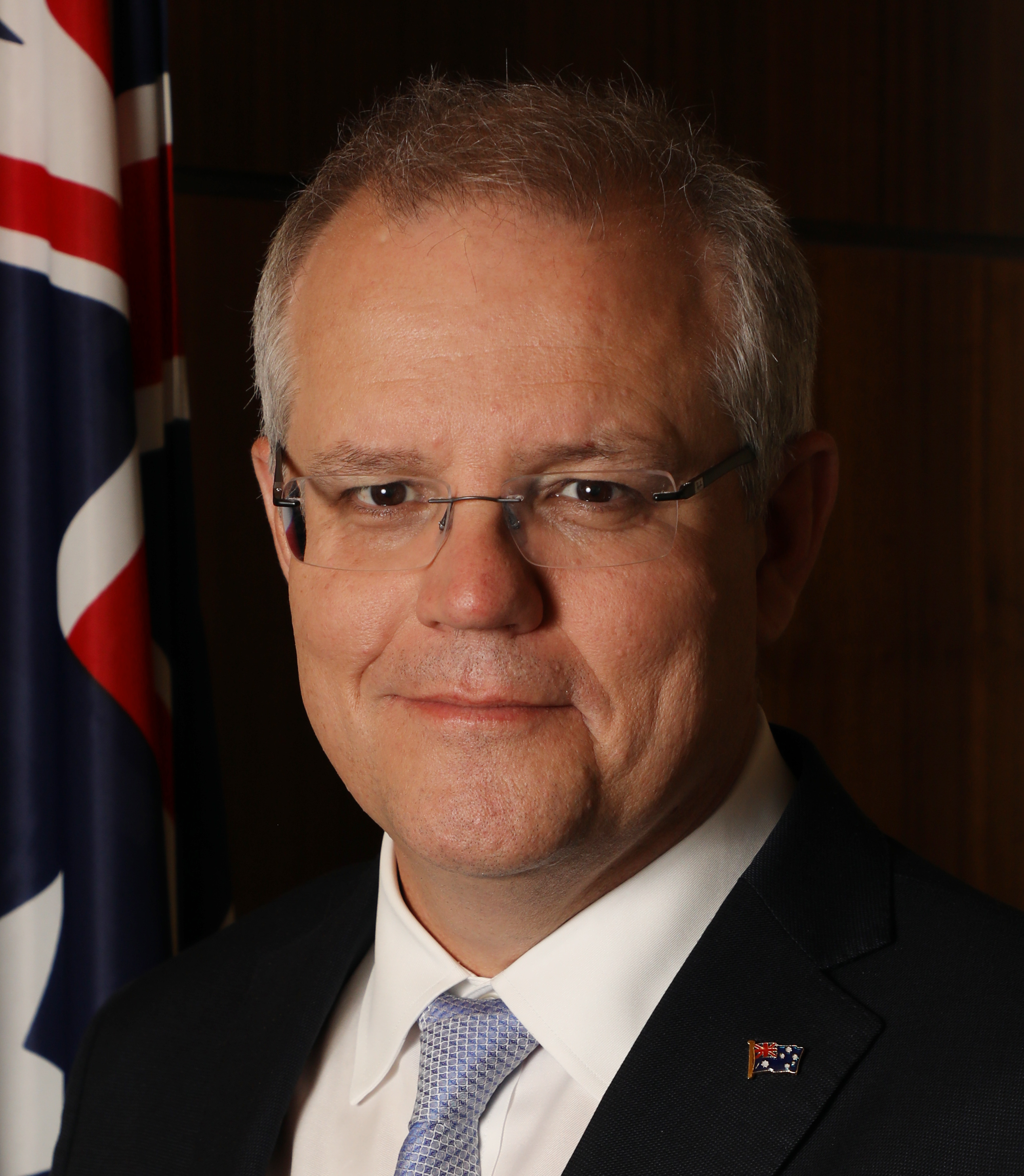
Scott Morrison

In the first Morrison Ministry, Josh Frydenberg succeeded Morrison as treasurer and Marise Payne succeeded Julie Bishop as foreign minister. Following his party room loss, Turnbull quit Parliament, plunging the Coalition into minority government following the 2018 Wentworth by-election. Morrison then restored the Coalition to majority government at the 2019 Election.

Frydenberg and Payne remained in their posts in the Second Morrison Ministry, which was notable for including Ken Wyatt as Minister for Indigenous Australians – the first Aboriginal Australian to sit in Federal Cabinet – and seven women members, which was the largest number of women Cabinet members in Australian history.

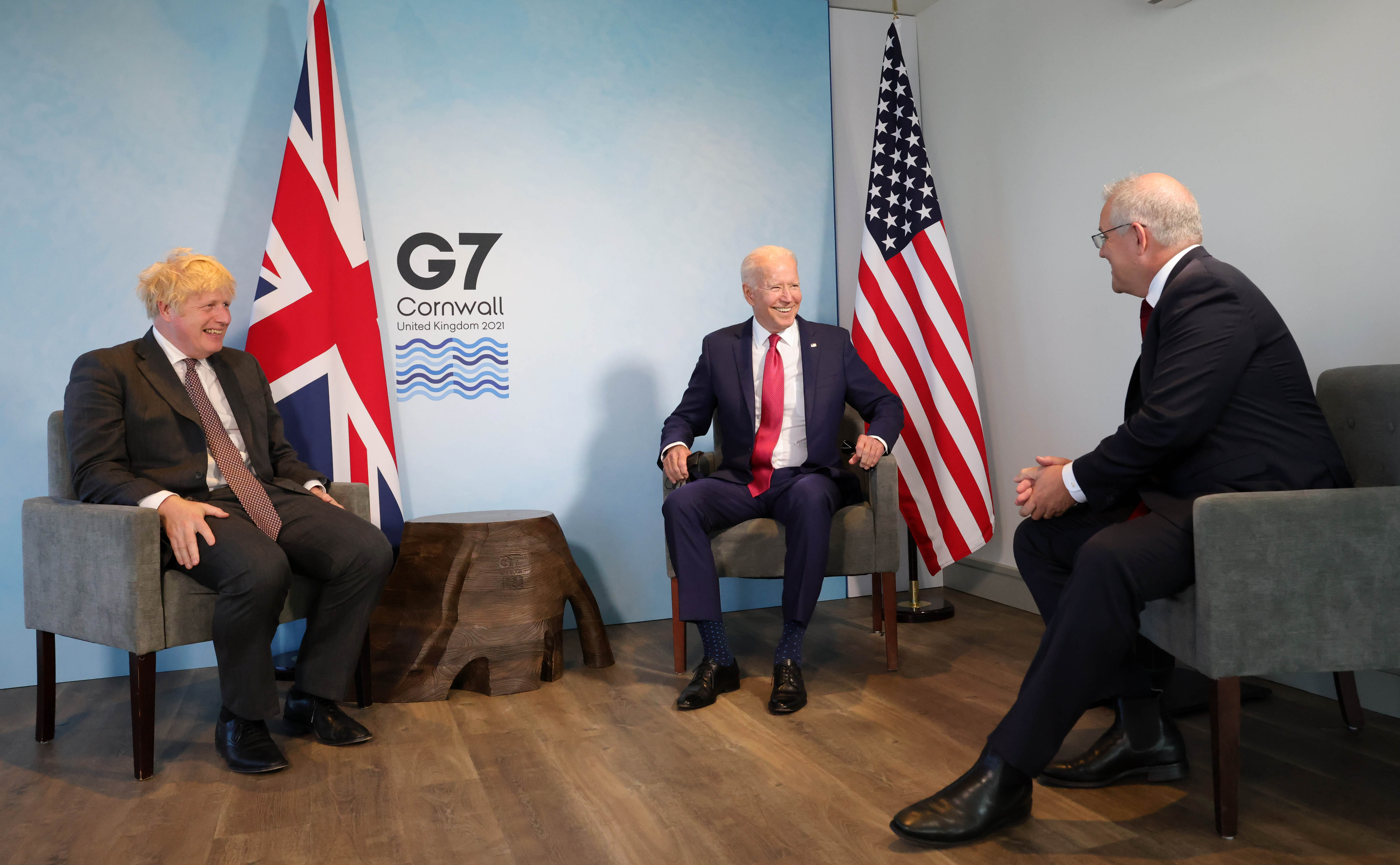
The Morrison Government negotiated the AUKUS defence pact with Britain and the United States

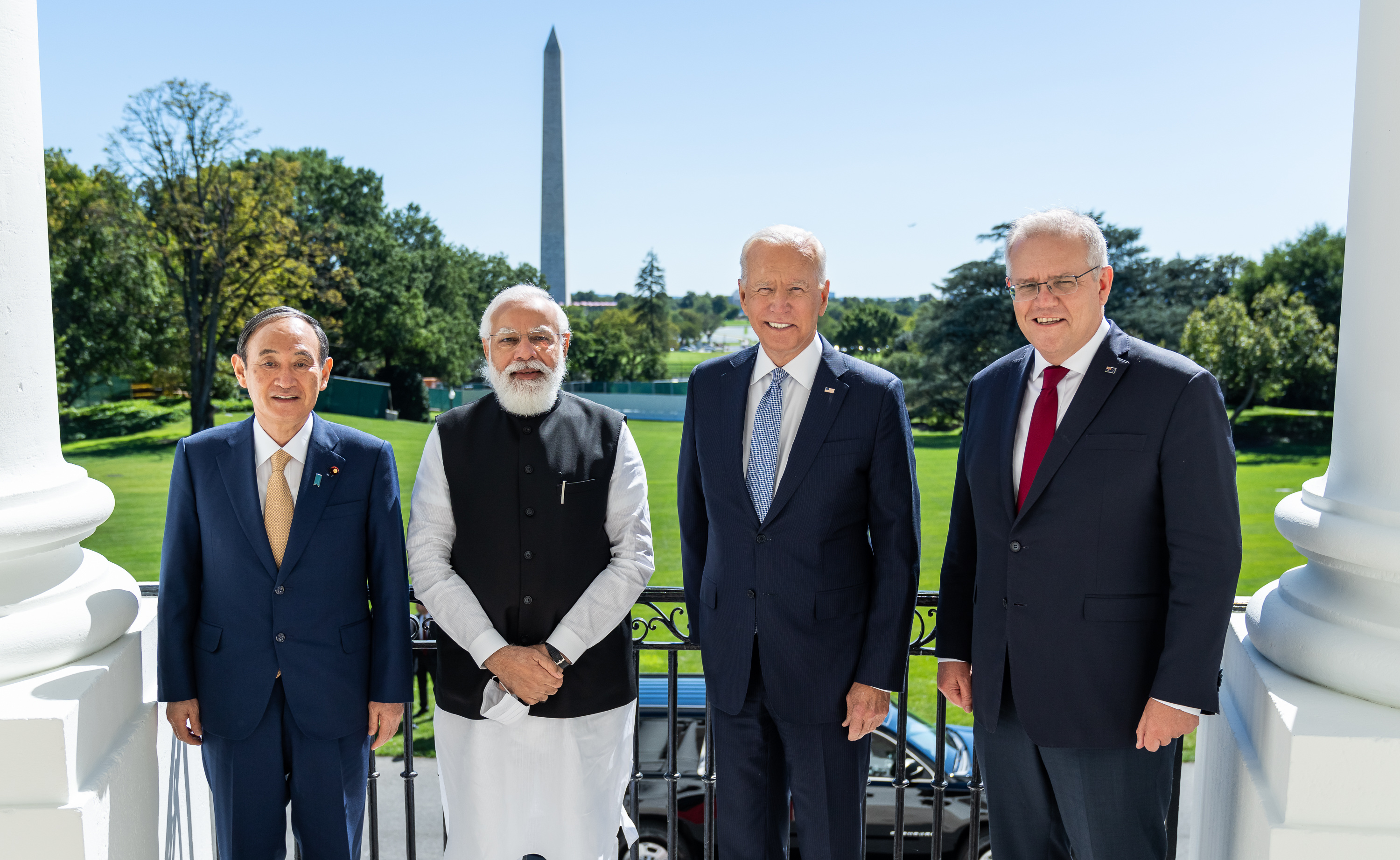
From left to right: Japanese prime minister Yoshihide Suga, Indian prime minister Narendra Modi, U.S. president Joe Biden and Prime Minister Scott Morrison at the first in-person Quad meeting in Washington, D.C., 2021

In economic affairs, after producing the lowest federal budget deficit in a decade, Treasurer Frydenberg predicted a small surplus in the 2019 Federal Budget, however the outbreak of the COVID-19 pandemic led to a dramatic increase in government expenditure and a brief recession by September 2020. Pandemic management became a core focus of the Morrison government, which instigated tight border controls, convened a National Cabinet to co-ordinate State and Territory government responses, and initiated a program of income support for business and workers. Two years into the pandemic, Australia had achieved one of the lowest death rates and highest vaccination rates in the world. By the fourth Frydenberg Budget in March 2022 ahead of the 2022 Election, Australia's unemployment rate was at 4% and projected to drop to 3.75%, its lowest figure in 50 years.

In trade and international affairs, the Morrison government concluded free trade agreements with Indonesia, the United Kingdom and India. In the Indo-Pacific region, Morrison launched the Pacific Step-Up initiative to increase engagement with Pacific Island nations, and revived the Quadrilateral Security Dialogue with Japan, India and United States. He also signed the AUKUS trilateral security pact with the United Kingdom and the United States to increase defence co-operation. The period was marked by a deterioration in bilateral relations with the increasingly autocratic Xi Jinping regime in China, with Australia calling for an independent inquiry into the origins of COVID-19 and China responding with trade sanctions. Following the Russian invasion of Ukraine in 2022, Morrison committed Australian military, diplomatic and humanitarian aid to support Ukraine's efforts to repel the Russian attack.

The Morrison government was defeated at the 2022 election, ending nearly nine years of a Coalition government. After the loss, Defence Minister Peter Dutton was elected to succeed Morrison as party leader. After leaving office, Morrison faced criticism after he revealed that during the pandemic emergency he had secretly held several ministerial positions while serving as prime minister, which resulted in Parliament passing a censure motion against him.

==== Opposition (2022–present) ====
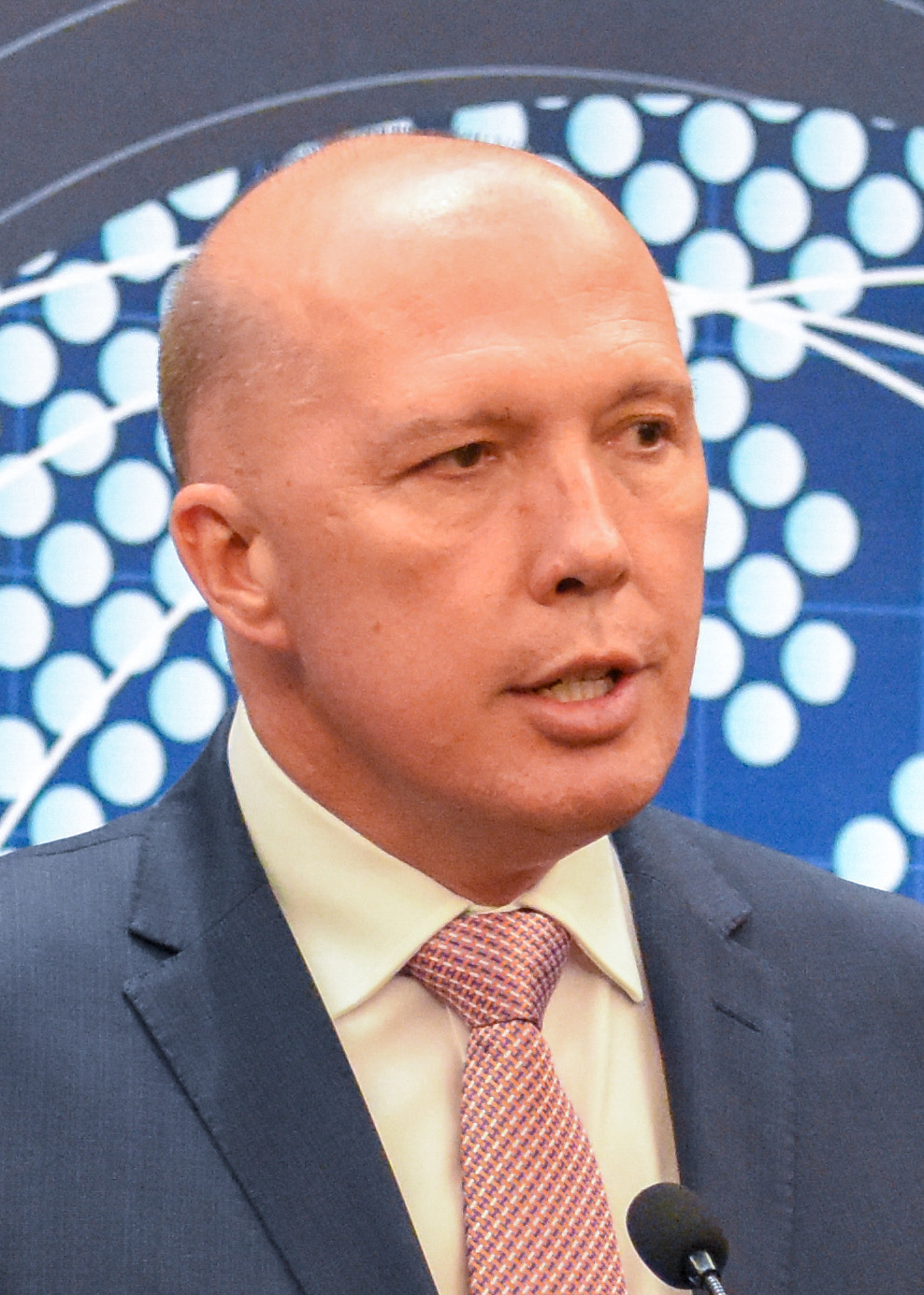
Peter Dutton

The incumbent minority Liberal–National Coalition government in New South Wales, led by Premier Dominic Perrottet, was defeated at an election in 2023. The outcome resulted in the first Labor government in the state in 12 years, ending the longest Coalition government in New South Wales history. In 2024, the party won government at elections in Tasmania, Queensland, and in the Northern Territory.

In 2025, early polling showed that the Coalition led by Dutton had been poised to win the 2025 election, however, it lost its lead as the year progressed, influenced by poorly received domestic campaigning alongside international damage to conservative politics as the second Trump administration took office in the United States. Resultantly, the Coalition was defeated by the incumbent Labor government in a landslide, with Dutton being defeated in his personal electorate of Dickson in Brisbane. The party's leadership was succeeded to by Sussan Ley, who became the first woman to hold either the position of leader of the Liberal Party or leader of the Opposition.

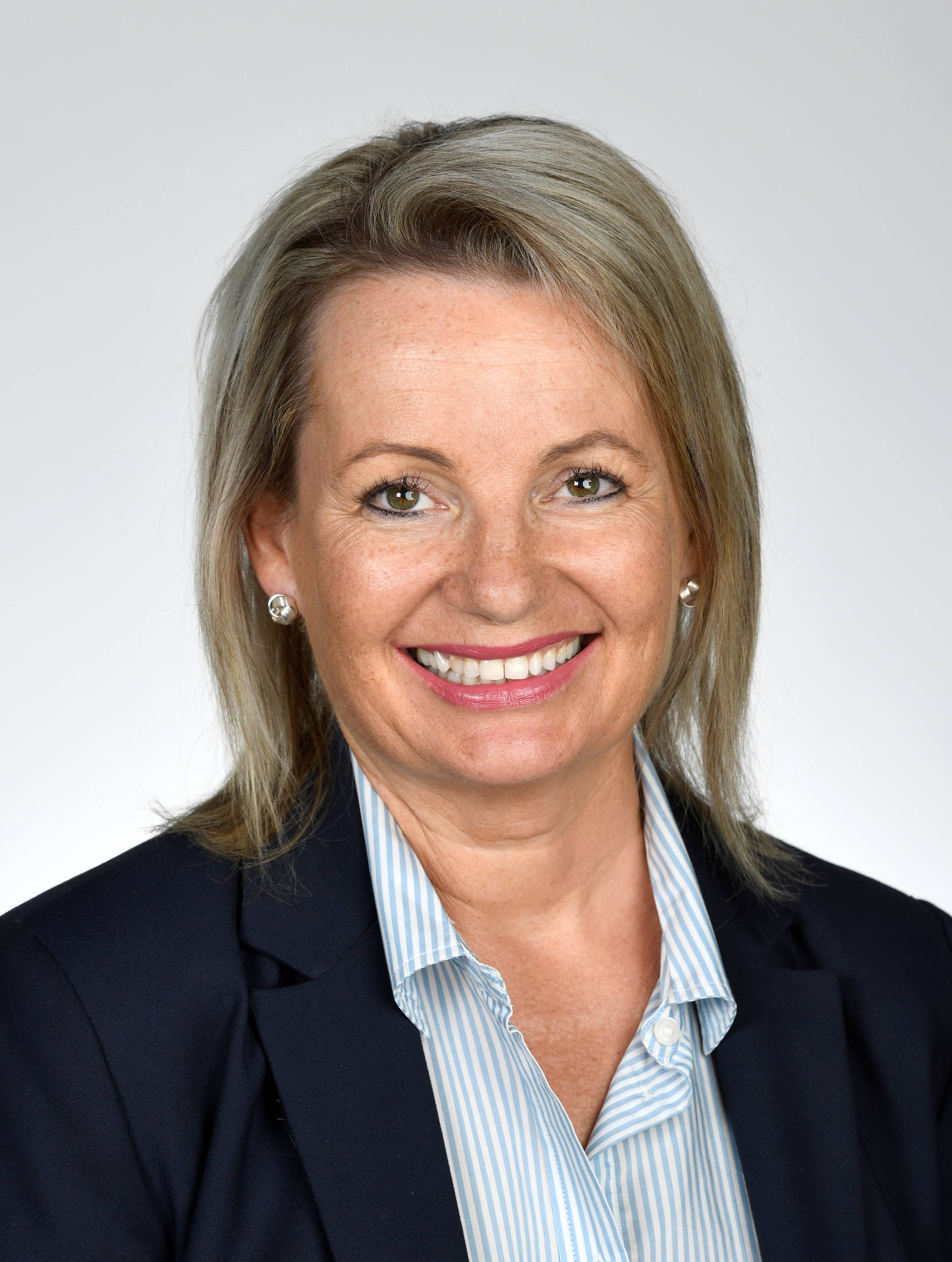
Sussan Ley

Weeks after the election, on 20 May 2025, the National Party briefly dissolved the Liberal–National Coalition agreement. This resulted in the two parties operating separately for the first time since 1987. The Liberal Party thus became the sole opposition party, though the Coalition was re-united on 28 May when the two parties agreed on several joint policies and unveiled a shadow ministry.

With her election as party leader, Sussan Ley became the first female leader of the Opposition at a federal level in Australian history. In her first address to the National Press Club of Australia as leader in June 2025, Ley said:

Aspiration is the foundation of the Australian promise: that if you work hard, play by the rules, do your best for your kids and contribute to your community, you will be able to build a better life for yourself and your family. That promise feels distant for many Australians today... As we seek to regain trust with all voters across our great country, the task before me – and my team – is to lead a Liberal Party that respects modern Australia, reflects modern Australia and represents modern Australia.

— Sussan Ley, 25 June 2025

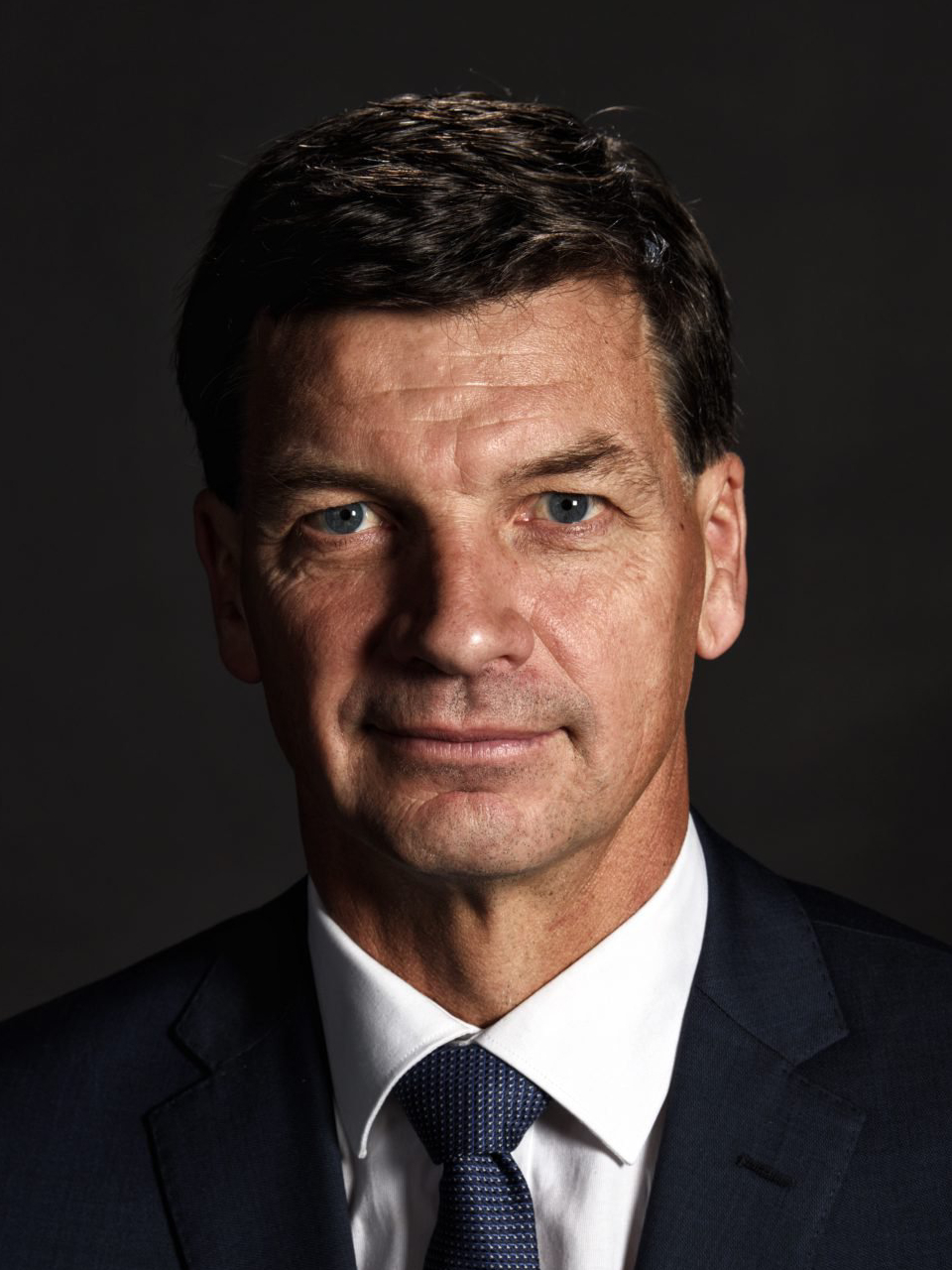
Angus Taylor

In January 2026, several National Party frontbenchers resigned from Ley's shadow cabinet due to significant ideological disagreements between the Liberal and National parties regarding hate speech laws drafted by the Albanese government in response to the Bondi Beach shooting. Ley accepted the resignations, which prompted all remaining National Party members of the shadow ministry to resign. Amid the height of the tension, National Party Leader David Littleproud announced the dissolution of the Liberal–National Coalition on 22 January. This marked the second of two splits during Sussan Ley's leadership in one year. The two parties were re-united on 8 February after 17 days apart.

On 13 February 2026, Angus Taylor defeated Ley in a leadership spill, becoming leader of the party and leader of the Opposition. Prior to the spill, Taylor resigned from the shadow cabinet during rising internal tensions and historically low opinion polling, before calling for a spill on 12 February.

== Notable firsts ==
- 1949: First Liberal prime minister: Sir Robert Menzies wins 1949 election.
- 1949: First woman in an Australian Federal Cabinet: Dame Enid Lyons appointed vice-president of the executive council in the Menzies government.
- 1966: First female minister in an Australian Government: Dame Annabelle Rankin becomes minister for housing in the Holt Government.
- 1971: First Aboriginal parliamentarian: Neville Bonner becomes a senator for Queensland.
- 1995: First female opposition leader to win an election: Kate Carnell becomes Chief Minister of the Australian Capital Territory
- 2010: First youngest federal Member of Parliament: Wyatt Roy is elected at 20 years and 89 days old.
- 2010: First Aboriginal elected to House of Representatives: Ken Wyatt becomes Member for Hasluck
- 2013: First Palestinian-Australian treasurer of Australia: Joe Hockey appointed treasurer in the Abbott government
- 2013: First female foreign minister: Julie Bishop appointed to the role in the Abbott Government
- 2013: First Aboriginal leader of a state or territory: Adam Giles becomes Chief Minister of the Northern Territory as leader of the Liberal-affiliated Country Liberal Party
- 2015: First Aboriginal Assistant Minister in an Australian Government: Ken Wyatt becomes Assistant Minister for Health in the Turnbull government
- 2015: First female minister for defence: Marise Payne appointed to the position in Turnbull government
- 2015: First youngest cabinet minister: Wyatt Roy is promoted to the cabinet at 25 years old.
- 2017: First Aboriginal minister in an Australian Government: Ken Wyatt becomes minister for aged care and minister for Indigenous health in the Turnbull government
- 2017: First Armenian-Australian premier of an Australian state: Gladys Berejiklian becomes Premier of New South Wales
- 2018: First Jewish-Australian Treasurer of Australia: Josh Frydenberg appointed treasurer in Morrison Government
- 2019: First Aboriginal member for Federal Cabinet: Ken Wyatt appointed minister for Indigenous Australians in the Morrison government
- 2020: First Korean-Australian to lead a major political party: Elizabeth Lee becomes Leader of the Opposition in the Australian Capital Territory
- 2025: First female Federal Opposition Leader: Sussan Ley elected to lead the Liberal Party.

== State and territory level ==
Since the Party's foundation, at the state level, the Liberals have been dominant for long periods in all states except Queensland, where they always held fewer seats than the National Party (though here the Coalition partners merged as the Liberal National Party of Queensland in 2008).

=== South Australia ===
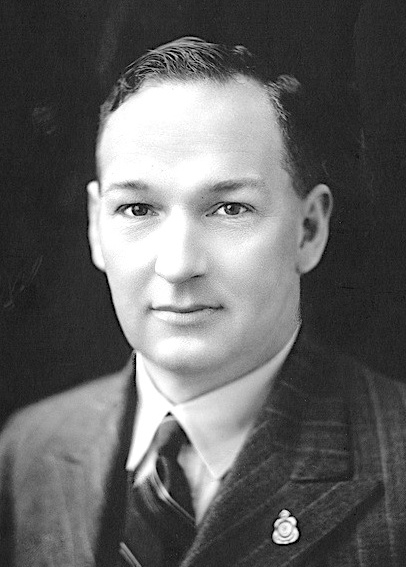
Liberal and Country League leader Sir Thomas Playford IV, the longest-serving Premier of any state in Australian history (1938–1965)

The Liberal and Country League (LCL) was founded by Richard Butler in 1932 and held office firstly under Butler from 1933, and then from 1938 by Sir Thomas Playford IV. Following the foundation of the Liberal Party in 1944, the LCL was incorporated to become a Liberal affiliated Party, though the state division would retain its name until it was changed to Liberal in 1974. Playford remained as Premier until 1965, though with assistance from an electoral malapportionment, or gerrymander, known as the Playmander. The LCL's Steele Hall governed for one term from the 1968 election to the 1970 election and during this time began the process of dismantling the Playmander.

Liberal David Tonkin became premier at the 1979 election for one term, losing office at the 1982 election. The Liberals returned to power at the 1993 election, led by premiers Dean Brown, John Olsen and Rob Kerin through two terms, until their defeat at the 2002 election. They remained in opposition for 16 years, under a record five opposition leaders, until Steven Marshall led the party to victory in the 2018 election. Marshall was ousted after just one term in 2022 by Labor's Peter Malinauskas in 2022.

=== Western Australia ===
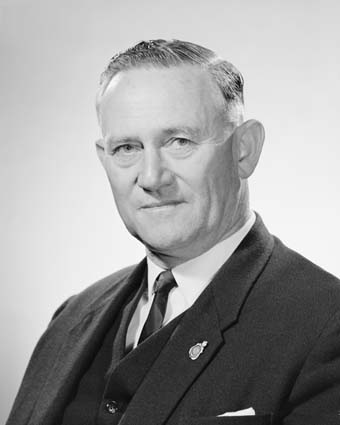
Sir David Brand, Western Australia's longest-serving Premier (1959–1971)

Sir Ross McLarty was the first Liberal premier of Western Australia, winning elections for the newly formed party in 1947 and 1950. Sir David Brand made his mark on the state as Liberal premier with four election victories from 1959 to 1968, finally losing to Labor in 1971.

Brand continued as Liberal leader in Opposition until 1973, when he was succeeded by Sir Charles Court who went on to three election wins in 1974, 1977 and 1980 and was succeeded by Ray O'Connor who won in 1982, before being defeated by Labor's Brian Burke in 1983. Labor remained in office until 1990, a period marred by the WA Inc corruption scandals, and the Liberals returned to power in WA for much of the 1990s under Richard Court, who won in 1993 and 1996 and losing to Labor in 2001.

The Liberals returned to power in the 2008 election, which saw Labor defeated after seven years by Colin Barnett, who became premier after securing support from the WA Nationals and three independents in a hung parliament. Barnett then won a landslide majority for the Liberal-National Coalition in the subsequent 2013 election, with the Liberals attaining a majority in their own right.

Barnett's Liberals suffered a heavy defeat in the 2017 election to Labor's Mark McGowan, who again won emphatically in 2021 following a period of popularity over his management of the COVID-19 pandemic. The Liberals were reduced to two Lower House seats, leaving the Nationals as the largest opposition party with four seats. In 2025, the Liberals under Libby Mettam won just seven seats in the Lower House, and the Nationals six, enabling the Liberals to reclaim formal status as the main Opposition Party.

=== Victoria ===
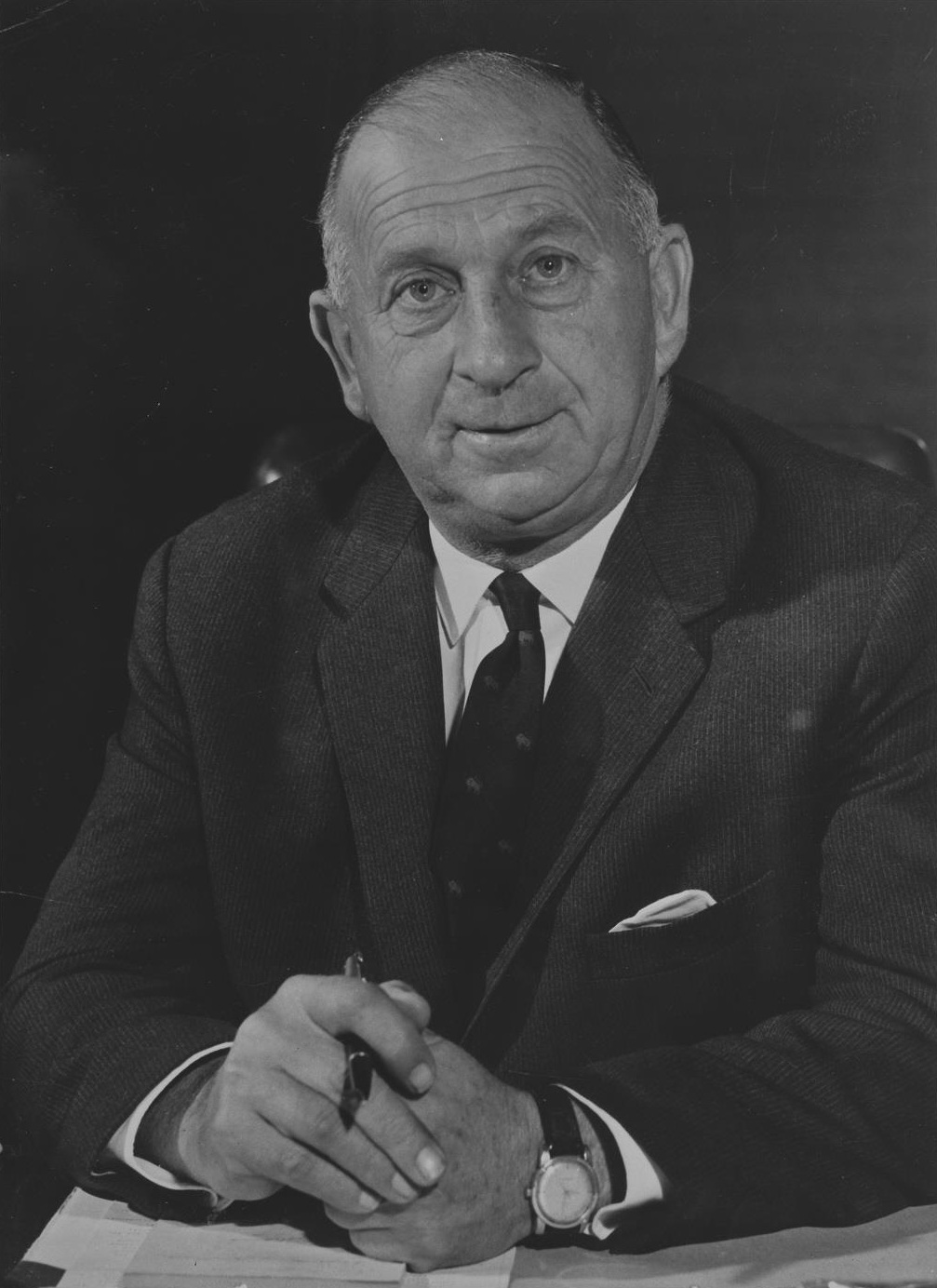
Sir Henry Bolte, Victoria's longest-serving Premier (1955–1972)

Known as the Liberal and Country Party (LCP) from 1949 to 1965, the Liberals were in power in Victoria uninterrupted from 1955 to 1982 under Sir Henry Bolte, Dick Hamer and Lindsay Thompson - a period when Victoria was known as the "jewel in the Liberal crown". Jeff Kennett led the party back to office in that state in 1992, and remained premier until 1999. Ted Baillieu led the Liberal-National Coalition to government in Victoria in 2010, ending a decade of Labor rule, but announced his retirement from politics ahead of the 2014 election. He was succeeded briefly as Liberal premier by Denis Napthine, and the one-term government who was defeated by Dan Andrews, who went on to win three successive elections for Labor.

=== New South Wales ===
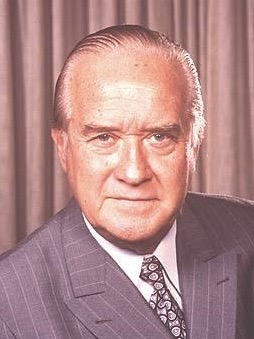
Sir Robert Askin, NSW's longest-serving Liberal Premier (1965–1975)

In New South Wales, the Liberal Party has not been in office as much as its Labor rival, and just three leaders have led the party from opposition to government in that state: Sir Robert Askin, who was premier from 1965 to 1975, Nick Greiner, who came to office in 1988 and resigned in 1992, and Barry O'Farrell who led the party out of 16 years in opposition in an historic landslide in 2011. The Coalition won a second consecutive landslide in March 2015, led by Premier Mike Baird, who ran for election offering an ambitious program of transport and infrastructure development.

Following Mike Baird's resignation in 2017, Gladys Berejiklian was elected party leader, becoming the first female Liberal premier and leading the Coalition to victory in the 2019 New South Wales state election. Berejiklian and her successor Dominic Perrottet continued the Party's ambitious program of infrastructure development. The Coalition lost to Labor in the 2023 election.

=== Tasmania ===
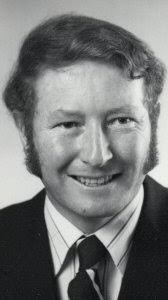
Robin Gray, Tasmania's longest-serving Liberal Premier (1982–1989)

Angus Bethune was elected as the first Liberal premier of Tasmania in 1969 Tasmanian state election, but Labor was returned in 1972 and governed until Robin Gray led the Liberals out of the wilderness in 1982, and won again in 1986. Ray Groom won again for the Liberals in 1992 and 1996, before Labor enjoyed 16 years in power from 1998 until Will Hodgman won office for the Liberals in 2014, ushering in an extended period of Liberal government. Hodgman won the 2018 election, and his successors Peter Gutwein won in 2021, and Jeremy Rockliff in 2024 & 2025.

=== Queensland ===
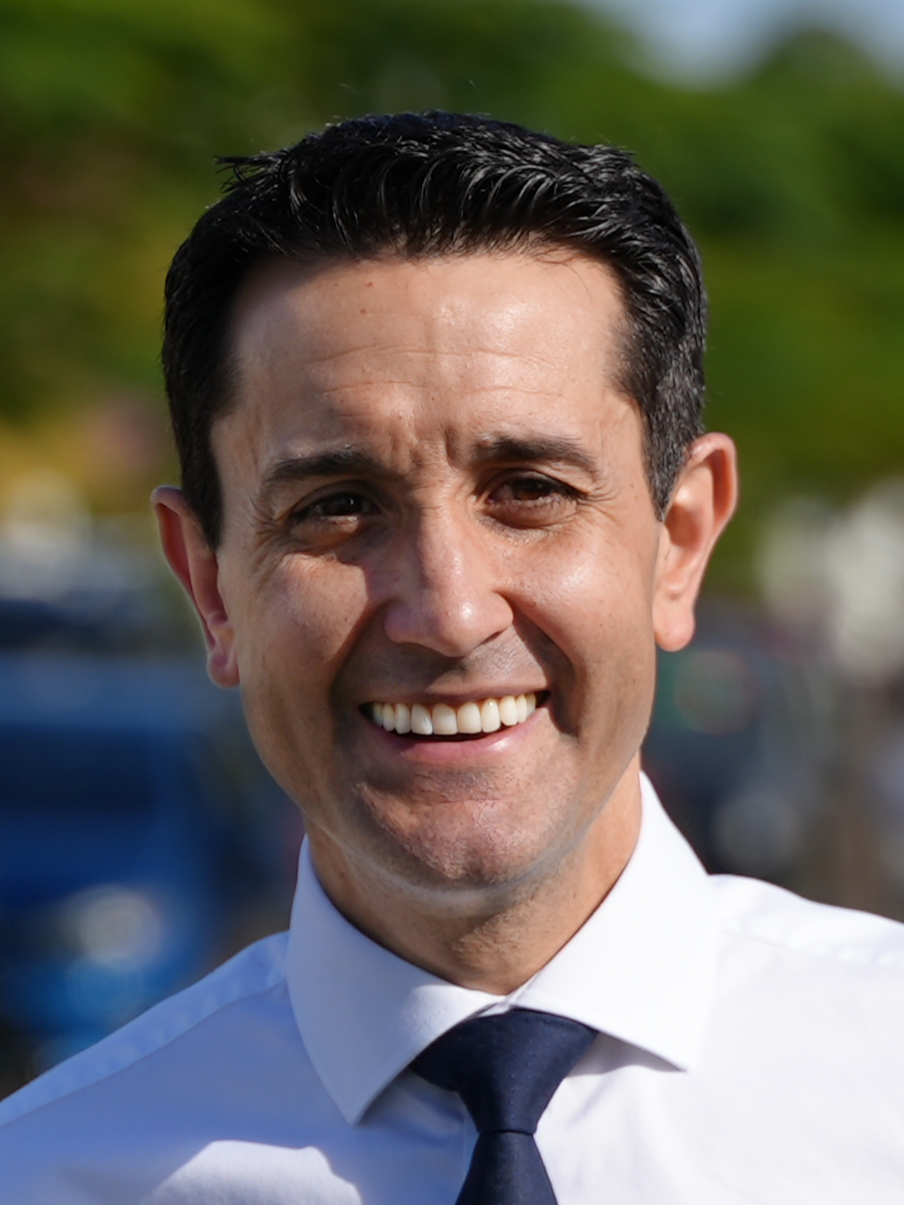
David Crisafulli, Premier of Queensland since 2024

The Liberals were for decades the junior Coalition partner in Queensland, where the Nationals were dominant in a state with a decentralised population - only Gordon Chalk served as Liberal Premier during this period, and only in a caretaker capacity following the death of Jack Pizzey and before the Country Party elected Joh Bjelke-Petersen to succeed Pizzey. Following the amalgamation of the Liberal and National Parties into the Liberal National Party of Queensland (LNP) in 2008, Campbell Newman led the LNP to a landslide victory in 2012, ending 13 years of Labor rule. However, Labor returned in the 2015 Queensland state election and remained in power for nearly a decade until David Crisafulli's victory in October 2024.

=== Northern Territory ===
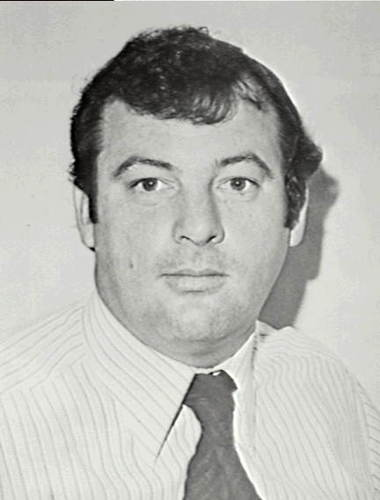
Country Liberal Paul Everingham, Northern Territory's longest-serving Chief Minister and head of government (1977-1984)

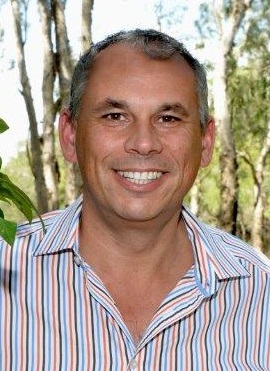
Country Liberal Chief Minister Adam Giles, the first Aboriginal Australian to head a State or Territory (2013-2016)

The dual aligned Country Liberal Party governed the Northern Territory from 1978 to 2001. After Labor rule in the Northern Territory from 2001, the Liberal affiliated Country Liberal Party returned to office in the Northern Territory in 2012 under Terry Mills, and via a 2013 leadership spill, elected Adam Giles as party leader, the first Aboriginal Australian to lead an Australian State or Territory. Giles went on to lose the 2016 Territory Election, ushering in a decade of Labor rule. Lia Finocchiaro brought the Country Liberals back into office in 2024 election.

=== Australian Capital Territory ===
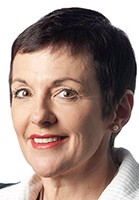
Kate Carnell, ACT's longest-serving Liberal Chief Minister and the first Liberal woman to lead a State or Territory, and the first woman to lead any party from Opposition into Government (1995-1998)

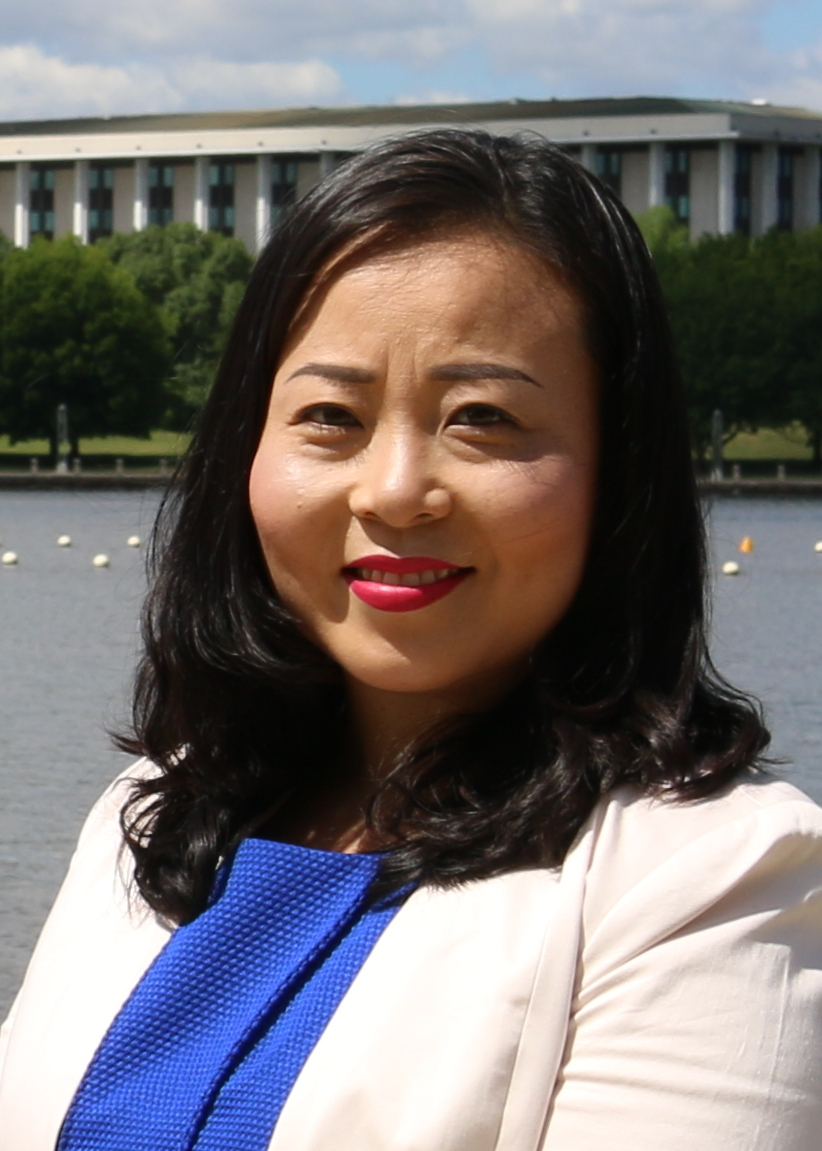
Elizabeth Lee, ACT Opposition Leader and the first Asian-Australian to lead a major party (2020-2024)

While Labor won government in the Australian Capital Territory's inaugural election in 1989, the Liberals Trevor Kaine became the first male Chief Minister of the ACT after a vote of no-confidence in the Follett Government in December 1989, but lost the office by the same means, when Rosemary Follett returned in 1991.

In winning the 1995 election, Liberal Kate Carnell became the first woman to lead any party from Opposition to Government in Australian history, serving as Chief Minister of the ACT from 1995 to 1998, succeeded by Liberal Gary Humphries who kept the party in office until 2000.

The Liberals have remained out of office in the Australian Capital Territory since Gary Humphries' loss in 2000. In 2016 while the Federal Liberals narrowly won re-election in July 2016, the Canberra Liberals lost their fifth election in a row. Elizabeth Lee, a Korean-Australian, won the leadership of the ACT Liberals in 2020, becoming the first Australian of Asian background to lead a major party. Lee led the party to defeat in the 2024 ACT election.

The Liberal Party does not officially contest most local government elections, although many members do run for office in local government as independents. An exception is the Brisbane City Council, where both Sallyanne Atkinson and Campbell Newman have been elected Lord Mayor of Brisbane.

== Ideology ==
From its foundation, the Liberal Party has had a great internal diversity in policy positions among its members, primarily defining itself as an anti-Labor, anti-Socialist party that supports individual freedom and private enterprise.

The party's founder and longest-serving leader Robert Menzies envisaged that Australia's middle class would form its main constituency.

Towards the end of his term as Prime Minister of Australia and in a final address to the Liberal Party Federal Council in 1964, Menzies spoke of the "Liberal Creed" as follows:

As the etymology of our name "Liberal" indicates, we have stood for freedom ... We took the name 'Liberal' because we were determined to be a progressive party, willing to make experiments, in no sense reactionary but believing in the individual, his right and his enterprise, and rejecting the socialist panacea. We have realised that men and women are not just ciphers in a calculation, but are individual human beings whose individual welfare and development must be the main concern of government ... We have learned that the right answer is to set the individual free, to aim at equality of opportunity, to protect the individual against oppression, to create a society in which rights and duties are recognised and made effective.

Soon after the election of the Howard government the new prime minister John Howard, who was to become the second longest-serving Liberal prime minister, spoke of his interpretation of the "Liberal Tradition" in a Robert Menzies Lecture in 1996:

Menzies knew the importance for Australian Liberalism to draw upon both the classical liberal as well as the conservative political traditions. He believed in a liberal political tradition that encompassed both Edmund Burke and John Stuart Mill—a tradition which I have described in contemporary terms as the broad church of Australian Liberalism.

Until the 2022 election, the Liberals were in electoral terms largely the party of the middle class (whom Menzies, in the era of the party's formation called "The forgotten people"), though such class-based voting patterns are no longer as clear as they once were. In the 1970s a left-wing middle class emerged that no longer voted Liberal. One effect of this was the success of a breakaway party, the Australian Democrats, founded in 1977 by former Liberal minister Don Chipp and members of minor liberal parties. During the prime ministership of John Howard, the Liberals did increasingly well among socially conservative working-class voters. Until 2022 the Liberal Party's key support base remained the upper-middle classes—in 2010, 16 of the 20 richest federal electorates were held by the Liberals, most of which were safe seats. Following the 2022 election, 16 of the 20 poorest seats in Australia were held by the Liberal Party, while it held only five of the 20 wealthiest electorates. In country areas they either compete with or have a truce with the Nationals, depending on various factors.

Menzies was an ardent constitutional monarchist, who supported the monarchy in Australia and links to the Commonwealth of Nations. Today the party is divided on the question of republicanism, with some (such as former leader Peter Dutton) being monarchists, while others (such as his successor Sussan Ley) are republicans. The Menzies government formalised Australia's alliance with the United States in 1951 and the party has remained a strong supporter of the mutual defence treaty.

Domestically, Menzies presided over a fairly regulated economy in which utilities were publicly owned, and commercial activity was highly regulated through centralised wage-fixing and high tariff protection. Liberal leaders from Menzies to Malcolm Fraser generally maintained Australia's high tariff levels. At that time the Liberals' coalition partner, the Country Party, the older of the two in the coalition (now known as the National Party), had considerable influence over the government's economic policies. It was not until the late 1970s and through their period out of power federally in the 1980s that the party came to be influenced by what was known as the New Right—a conservative liberal group who advocated market deregulation, privatisation of public utilities, reductions in the size of government programs and tax cuts.

Socially, while liberty and freedom of enterprise form the basis of its beliefs, elements of the party include both what is termed small-l liberalism and social conservatism. Historically, Liberal governments have been responsible for the carriage of a number of notable socially liberal reforms, including the opening of Australia to multiethnic immigration under Menzies and Harold Holt; Holt's 1967 Referendum on Aboriginal Rights; John Gorton's support for cinema and the arts; and Malcolm Fraser's Aboriginal Land Rights Act 1976.

The Liberal Party is a member of the International Democracy Union and the Asia Pacific Democrat Union.

== Factions ==
According to Ronald Mizen of The Australian Financial Review, following the 2025 federal election there are two major factional groupings in the federal parliamentary Liberal Party: the Moderates and the National Right. Factional alignments are "fluid and often built around personalities", with several individuals either identifying with multiple factions or remaining unaligned.

During the Morrison government years, the Liberal Party consisted of three broad factional groupings: a moderate wing, a centre-right wing and a right wing, led by Simon Birmingham, Scott Morrison and Peter Dutton respectively, with the Centre-Right being the largest faction, with 32 of 91 Liberal MPs belonging to the group. The 2022 Australian federal election saw a significant realignment of factional affiliations within the Liberal Party: the National Right became the largest faction with 27 of 65 Liberal MPs aligned with the faction, the Centre-Right went from being the largest faction to the smallest faction, plummeting from 32 members to just 6, the Moderates' membership dropped from 22 members to 14, while a Centrist faction emerged, comprising 11 members. In 2025, Ley of the moderate faction was elected leader of the party. Still, members of the Liberal Party often are grouped into the three-faction system.

== Organisation ==
Position	Leader	House or Senate	Electorate	Faction
Party office
President	Tony Abbott	—N/a		
Treasurer	Charlie Taylor	—N/a		
Director	Andrew Hirst	—N/a		
Parliament
Leader	Angus Taylor	House of Representatives	Hume (NSW)	National Right
Deputy Leader	Jane Hume	Senate	Victoria (Senate)	Moderate
Manager of Opposition Business in the House	Dan Tehan	House of Representatives	Wannon (Vic)	National Right
Manager of Opposition Business in the Senate	Jonathon Duniam	Senate	Tasmania (Tas)	National Right
Senate Leader	Michaelia Cash	Senate	Western Australia	National Right
Deputy Senate Leader	Anne Ruston	Senate	South Australia	Moderate

The Liberal Party's organisation is dominated by the six autonomous state divisions, reflecting the party's original commitment to a federalised system of government (a commitment which was strongly maintained by all Liberal governments bar the Gorton government until 1983, but was to a large extent abandoned by the Howard government, which showed strong centralising tendencies). Party policy is made almost entirely by the parliamentary parties as opposed to the federal and state and territorial party organisations, although Liberal party members do have a degree of influence over party policy.

The Liberal Party's basic organisational unit is the branch, which consists of party members in a particular locality. For each electorate there is a conference—notionally above the branches—which coordinates campaigning in the electorate and regularly communicates with the member (or candidate) for the electorate. As there are three levels of government in Australia, each branch elects delegates to a local, state, and federal conference.

All the branches in an Australian state are grouped into a Division. The ruling body for the Division is a State Council. There is also one Federal Council which represents the entire organisational Liberal Party in Australia. Branch executives are delegates to the Councils ex-officio and additional delegates are elected by branches, depending on their size.

Preselection of electoral candidates is performed by a special electoral college convened for the purpose. Membership of the electoral college consists of head office delegates, branch officers, and elected delegates from branches.

=== State and territory divisions ===
Note that the following table only consists of Liberal members of parliament. This means that members of the National Party are not present, except in the LNP and CLP.

Division	Leader	Last election						Status	Federal representatives	
Division	Leader	Lower House				Upper House		Status	MPs	Senators
Division	Leader	Year	Votes (%)	Seats	TPP (%)	Votes (%)	Seats	Status	MPs	Senators
Queensland (Note: The Liberal National Party of Queensland (LNP) is the result of a merger of the Queensland Liberal Party and the Queensland National Party to contest elections as a single party. It is officially a division of the federal Liberal Party, affiliated with The National Party.)	David Crisafulli	2024	41.5	52 / 93	53.8	—N/a (Note: Queensland has maintained a unicameral legislature since 1922.)		Majority government	10 / 30	2 / 12
Northern Territory (Note: The Country Liberal Party is an associate of both the Liberal and National parties on a federal level.)	Lia Finocchiaro	2024	49.0	17 / 25	57.1	—N/a (Note: The Northern Territory has a unicameral parliament.)		Majority government	0 / 2	1 / 2
Tasmania	Jeremy Rockliff	2024	36.67	14 / 35	—N/a (Note: Tasmania uses a semi-proportional system and thus TPP is not calculated.)	—N/a (Note: Tasmania elects Legislative Councillors on a periodic basis, with elections held almost every year.)	4 / 15	Minority government	0 / 5	4 / 12
New South Wales	Kellie Sloane	2023	26.78	24 / 93	45.73 (Note: Combined with the New South Wales National Party.)	29.78	9 / 42	Liberal–National Coalition opposition	5 / 46	4 / 12
South Australia	Ashton Hurn	2026	18.9	5 / 47	—N/a (Note: Due to an even split of the primary vote between the Liberals and One Nation, the Electoral Commission of South Australia abandoned an attempt to calculate a two-party-preferred result as 25 two-candidate-preferred contests were Labor–One Nation and 13 were Labor–Liberal.)	17.7	6 / 22	Opposition	3 / 10	6 / 12
Australian Capital Territory	Mark Parton	2024	33.5	9 / 25	—N/a (Note: The ACT uses a semi-proportional system and thus TPP is not calculated.)	—N/a (Note: The ACT has a unicameral parliament.)		Opposition	0 / 3	0 / 2
Victoria	Jess Wilson	2022	29.76	19 / 88	45.00 (Note: Combined with the Victorian National Party.)	29.44	14 / 40	Liberal–National Coalition opposition	6 / 39	3 / 12
Western Australia	Basil Zempilas	2025	28.0	7 / 59	42.9	27.27	10 / 36	Liberal–National opposition alliance	5 / 15	5 / 12

=== Federal presidents ===
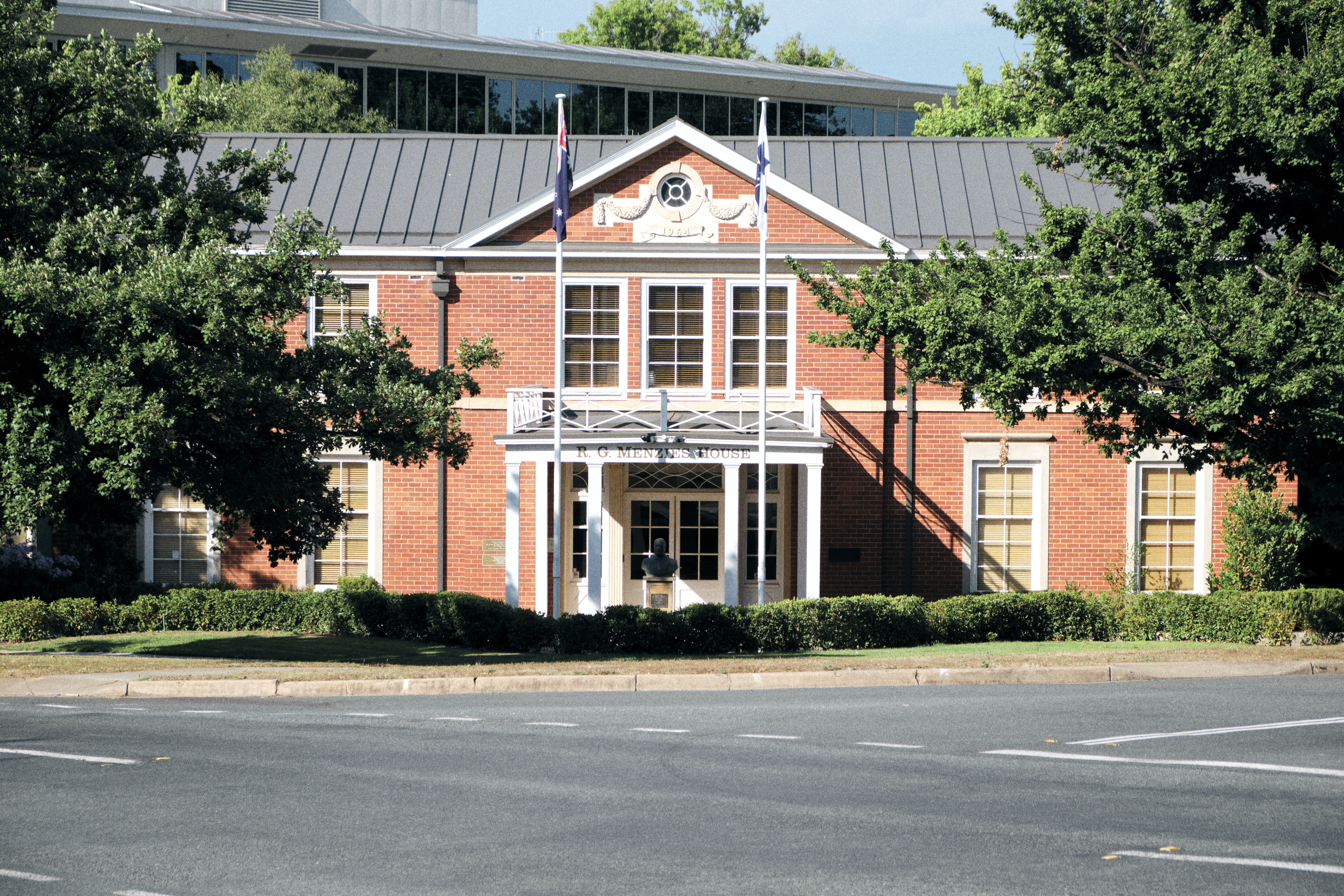
R.G. Menzies House, the Liberal Party's national headquarters, in the Canberra suburb of Barton

=== Networks and party wings ===
The Liberal Party has several party wings and networks. Major party wings include:

- The Federal Women's Committee (the women's wing)
- The Young Liberals (the youth wing)

Other networks include an overseas wing (Australian Liberals Abroad) and a Norfolk Island wing (operated by the Canberra Liberals).

== Election results ==
=== House of Representatives ===
Note that the following table only consists of Liberal members of parliament. This means that members of the National Party are not present, except in the LNP and CLP.

Election	Leader	Votes	%	Seats	+/–	Position	Status
1946	Robert Menzies	1,431,682	32.95	15 / 74	▲15	▲2nd	Opposition
1949	Robert Menzies	1,813,794	39.39	55 / 121	▲40	▲1st	Coalition
1951	Robert Menzies	1,854,799	40.62	52 / 121	▼3	▼2nd	Coalition
1954	Robert Menzies	1,745,808	38.31	47 / 121	▼5	2nd	Coalition
1955	Robert Menzies	1,746,485	39.73	57 / 122	▲10	▲1st	Coalition
1958	Robert Menzies	1,859,180	37.23	58 / 122	▲1	1st	Coalition
1961	Robert Menzies	1,761,738	33.58	45 / 122	▼13	▼2nd	Coalition
1963	Robert Menzies	2,030,823	37.09	52 / 122	▲7	2nd	Coalition
1966	Harold Holt	2,291,964	40.14	61 / 124	▲9	▲1st	Coalition
1969	John Gorton	2,125,987	34.77	46 / 125	▼15	▼2nd	Coalition
1972	William McMahon	2,115,085	32.04	38 / 125	▼8	2nd	Opposition
1974	Billy Snedden	2,582,968	34.95	40 / 127	▲2	2nd	Opposition
1975	Malcolm Fraser	3,232,159	41.80	68 / 127	▲28	▲1st	Coalition
1977	Malcolm Fraser	3,017,896	38.09	67 / 124	▼1	1st	Coalition
1980	Malcolm Fraser	3,108,512	37.43	54 / 125	▼13	1st	Coalition
1983	Malcolm Fraser	2,983,986	34.36	33 / 125	▼21	▼2nd	Opposition
1984	Andrew Peacock	2,951,556	34.06	45 / 148	▲12	2nd	Opposition
1987	John Howard	3,175,262	34.41	43 / 148	▼2	2nd	Opposition
1990	Andrew Peacock	3,468,570	35.04	55 / 148	▲12	2nd	Opposition
1993	John Hewson	3,923,786	37.10	49 / 147	▼6	2nd	Opposition
1996	John Howard	4,210,689	38.69	75 / 148	▲26	▲1st	Coalition
1998	John Howard	3,764,707	33.89	64 / 148	▼11	▼2nd	Coalition
2001	John Howard	4,244,072	37.40	68 / 150	▲4	▲1st	Coalition
2004	John Howard	4,741,458	40.47	74 / 150	▲5	1st	Coalition
2007	John Howard	4,546,600	36.60	55 / 150	▼20	▼2nd	Opposition
2010	Tony Abbott	3,777,383	30.46	60 / 150 (Note: Including the 17 LNP MPs who sit in the Liberal party room.)	▲5	2nd	Opposition
2013	Tony Abbott	4,134,865	32.02	74 / 150 (Note: Including the 16 LNP MPs who sit in the Liberal party room.)	▲14	▲1st	Coalition
2016	Malcolm Turnbull	3,882,905	28.67	60 / 150	▼14	▼2nd	Coalition
2019	Scott Morrison	3,989,435	27.97	61 / 151	▲1	2nd	Coalition
2022	Scott Morrison	3,502,713	23.89	42 / 151	▼19	2nd	Opposition
2025	Peter Dutton	3,205,216	20.69	28 / 150 (Note: Including the 10 LNP MPs who sit in the Liberal party room)	▼14	2nd	Opposition

=== Election reviews ===
Australian federal elections
Election	Election result	Review title	Panelists	Ref
**2025**	Opposition	Review of the 2025 federal election	Pru Goward; Nick Minchin	
**2022**	Opposition	Review of the 2022 Federal Election	Pru Goward; Nick Minchin	

=== Results timeline ===
Year	(Australia) AU	(Australian Capital Territory) ACT	(New South Wales) NSW	(Northern Territory) NT	(Queensland) Qld	(South Australia) SA	(Tasmania) Tas	(Victoria (state)) Vic	(Western Australia) WA
1945	N/A	N/A	N/A	N/A	N/A	N/A	N/A	▼20.5	N/A
1946	▲32.3	N/A	N/A	N/A	N/A	N/A	▼34.2	▼20.5	N/A
1947	▲32.3	N/A	29.6	N/A	▲25.7	▼40.4	▼34.2	▲37.2	▲35.2
1948	▲32.3	N/A	29.6	N/A	▲25.7		▲37.8		
1949	▲39.4	N/A	29.6	N/A	▲25.7		▲37.8		
1950		N/A	▲37.5	N/A	▲29.9	▲40.5	▲47.6	▲40.7	▲40.1
1951	▲40.6	N/A	▲37.5	N/A	▲29.9		▲47.6		
1952		N/A	▲37.5	N/A	▲29.9		▲47.6	▼24.9	
1953		N/A	▼27.9	N/A	▼21.3	▼36.5	▲47.6	▼24.9	▼38.0
1954	▼38.3	N/A	▼27.9	N/A	▼21.3		▲47.6	▼24.9	▼38.0
1955	▲39.7	N/A	▼27.9	N/A	▼21.3		▼45.3	▲37.8	▼38.0
1956		N/A	▲35.1	N/A	▲25.1	▲36.7	▼43.6		▼33.1
1957		N/A	▲35.1	N/A	▼23.2		▼43.6		▼33.1
1958	▼37.2	N/A	▲35.1	N/A			▼43.6	▼37.2	▼33.1
1959		N/A	▲35.4	N/A		▲37.0	▼41.1		▲37.5
1960		N/A	▲35.4	N/A	▲24.0		▼41.1		
1961	▼33.6	N/A	▲35.4	N/A			▼41.1	▼36.4	
1962		N/A	▼34.9	N/A		▼34.5	▼41.1		▲41.2
1963	▲37.1	N/A	▼34.9	N/A	▼23.8		▼41.1		
1964		N/A	▼34.9	N/A			▼38.5	▲39.6	
1965		N/A	▲39.6	N/A		▲35.9	▼38.5		▲48.0
1966	▲40.1	N/A		N/A	▲25.5	▲35.9	▼38.5		
1967		N/A		N/A		▲35.9	▼38.5	▼37.5	
1968		N/A	▼38.5	N/A		▲43.8	▼38.5		▼44.0
1969	▼34.8	N/A		N/A	▼23.7		▲44.0		
1970		N/A		N/A		▼43.8		▲36.7	
1971		N/A	▼35.7	N/A		▼43.8			▼29.7
1972	▼32.0	N/A		N/A	▼22.2	▼43.8	▼38.4		▼29.7
1973	▼32.0	N/A	▼33.8	N/A		▼39.8	▼38.4	▲42.3	▼29.7
1974	▼34.9	N/A		49.0	▲31.1	▼39.8	▼38.4		▲40.3
1975	▲41.8	N/A				▼31.5	▼38.4		
1976		N/A	▲36.3			▼31.5	▲44.5	▲45.9	
1977	▼38.1	N/A	▲36.3	▼40.1	▼25.2	▲41.2	▲44.5		▲49.4
1978		N/A	▼27.0			▲41.2	▲44.5		
1979		N/A	▼27.0			▲47.9	▼41.3	▼41.4	
1980	▼37.4	N/A	▼27.0	▲50.0	▲26.9		▼41.3		▼43.7
1981		N/A	▲27.6				▼41.3		
1982		N/A	▲27.6			▼42.7	▲48.5	▼38.3	
1983	▼34.4	N/A	▲27.6	▲58.2	▼14.9	▼42.7		▼38.3	▼39.9
1984	▼34.1	N/A	▲32.2		▼14.9	▼42.7		▼38.3	▼39.9
1985	▼34.1	N/A	▲32.2		▼14.9	▼42.2		▲41.9	▼39.9
1986	▼34.1	N/A	▲32.2		▲16.5	▼42.2	▲54.2	▲41.9	▲41.3
1987	▲34.4	N/A	▲32.2	▼39.4	▲16.5	▼42.2		▲41.9	▲41.3
1988	▲34.4	N/A	▲35.8		▲16.5	▼42.2		▼40.5	▲41.3
1989	▲34.4	14.9			▲21.1	▲44.2	▼46.9	▼40.5	▲42.8
1990	▲35.0	14.9		▲48.8	▲21.1	▲44.2	▼46.9	▼40.5	▲42.8
1991	▲35.0	14.9	▼34.2		▲21.1	▲44.2	▼46.9	▼40.5	▲42.8
1992	▲35.0	▲29.0			▼20.4	▲44.2	▲54.1	▲44.2	▲42.8
1993	▲37.1	▲29.0			▼20.4	▲52.8			▲44.1
1994	▲37.1	▲29.0		▲51.9	▼20.4				
1995	▲37.1	▲40.5	▼32.8		▲22.7				
1996	▲38.7		▼32.8		▲22.7		▼41.2	▼44.0	▼39.9
1997			▼32.8	▲54.7	▲22.7	▼40.4			
1998	▼33.9	▼37.8	▼32.8		▼16.1		▼38.1		
1999			▼24.8		▼16.1		▼38.1	▼42.2	
2000			▼24.8		▼16.1		▼38.1	▼42.2	
2001	▲37.4	▼31.6	▼24.8	▼45.4	▼14.3		▼38.1	▼42.2	▼31.2
2002		▼31.6	▼24.8	▼45.4	▼14.3	▼39.9	▼27.4	▼33.9	▼31.2
2003		▼31.6	▼24.7	▼45.4	▼14.3	▼39.9	▼27.4	▼33.9	▼31.2
2004	▲40.5	▲34.8	▼24.7	▼45.4	▲18.5	▼39.9	▼27.4	▼33.9	▼31.2
2005		▲34.8	▼24.7	▼25.7	▲18.5	▼39.9	▼27.4	▼33.9	▲35.6
2006		▲34.8	▼24.7	▼25.7	▲20.1	▼34.0	▲31.8	▲34.4	▲35.6
2007	▼36.6	▲34.8	▲27.0	▼25.7	▲20.1	▼34.0	▲31.8	▲34.4	▲35.6
2008	▼36.6	▼31.6	▲27.0	▲45.4	▲20.1	▼34.0	▲31.8	▲34.4	▲38.4
2009	▼36.6	▼31.6	▲27.0	▲45.4	▼41.6	▼34.0	▲31.8	▲34.4	
2010	▼30.5	▼31.6	▲27.0	▲45.4	▼41.6	▲41.7	▲39.0	▲38.0	
2011	▼30.5	▼31.6	▲38.6	▲45.4	▼41.6	▲41.7	▲39.0		
2012	▼30.5	▲38.9		▲50.6	▲49.6	▲41.7	▲39.0		
2013	▲32.0	▲38.9				▲41.7	▲39.0		▲38.4
2014		▲38.9				▲44.8	▲51.2	▼36.5	
2015		▲38.9	▼35.1		▼41.3	▲44.8		▼36.5	
2016	▼28.7	▼36.7		▼31.8	▼41.3	▲44.8		▼36.5	
2017		▼36.7		▼31.8	▼33.7	▲44.8		▼36.5	▼31.2
2018		▼36.7		▼31.8	▼33.7	▼38.0	▼50.3	▼30.4	▼31.2
2019	▼28.0	▼36.7	▼32.0	▼31.8	▼33.7			▼30.4	▼31.2
2020		▼33.8		▼31.3	▲35.9			▼30.4	▼31.2
2021		▼33.8		▼31.3	▲35.9		▼48.7	▼30.4	▼21.3
2022	▼23.9	▼33.8		▼31.3	▲35.9	▼35.7		▼29.7	▼21.3
2023	▼23.9	▼33.8	▼26.8	▼31.3	▲35.9	▼35.7		▼29.7	▼21.3
2024	▼23.9	▼33.5	▼26.8	▲49.2	▲41.6	▼35.7	▼36.7	▼29.7	▼21.3
2025	▼20.7	▼33.5	▼26.8			▼35.7	▲39.9	▼29.7	▲28.0
2026	▼20.7	▼33.5	▼26.8			▼18.9		—N/a (Note: The 2026 Victorian state election will be held on 28 November 2026)	▲28.0
Year	(Australia) AU	(Australian Capital Territory) ACT	(New South Wales) NSW	(Northern Territory) NT	(Queensland) Qld	(South Australia) SA	(Tasmania) Tas	(Victoria (state)) Vic	(Western Australia) WA
**Bold** indicates best result to date. Present in legislature (in opposition); Junior coalition partner Senior coalition partner

== Donors ==
For the 2015–2016 financial year, the top ten disclosed donors to the Liberal Party were: Paul Marks (Nimrod resources) ($1,300,000), Pratt Holdings ($790,000), Hong Kong Kingson Investment Company ($710,000), Aus Gold Mining Group ($410,000), Village Roadshow ($325,000), Waratah Group ($300,000), Walker Corporation ($225,000), Australian Gypsum Industries ($196,000), National Automotive Leasing and Salary Packaging Association ($177,000) and Westfield Corporation ($150,000).

The Liberal Party also receives undisclosed funding through several methods, such as "associated entities". Cormack Foundation, Eight by Five, Free Enterprise Foundation, Federal Forum and Northern Sydney Conservative forum are entities which have been used to funnel donations to the Liberal Party without disclosing the source.

== See also ==
- Country Liberal Party (Northern Territory)
- Liberal National Party (Queensland)
- Liberal Party of Australia (New South Wales Division)
- Liberal Party of Australia (South Australian Division)
- Liberal Party of Australia (Tasmanian Division)
- Liberal Party of Australia (Victorian Division)
- List of political parties in Australia
- Turnbull Government (2015–2018)
- Abbott Government (2013–2015)
- Liberalism in Australia
- Moderates
- Young Liberal Movement of Australia
- List of major liberal parties considered right
