= 1969 Liberal Party of Australia leadership spill =

Liberal Party of Australia leadership spill, 1969
← 1968	7 November 1969	1971 →
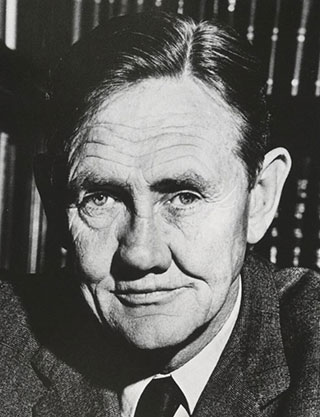

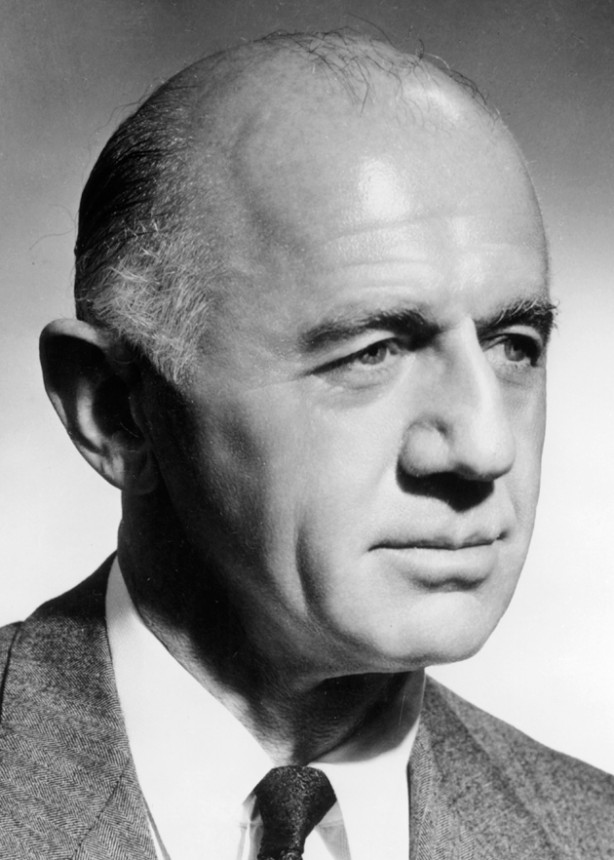

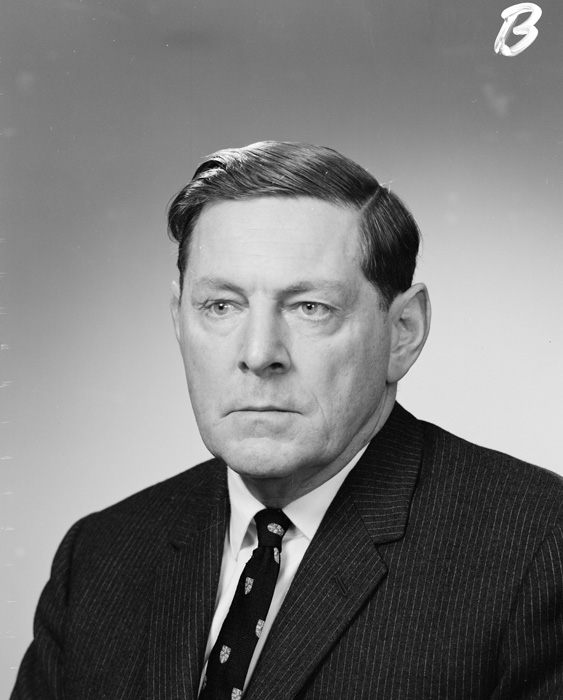
Candidate	John Gorton	William McMahon	David Fairbairn
First Ballot	34–40 (est.)	20–25 (est.)	5–6 (est.)
Seat	Higgins (Vic.)	Lowe (NSW)	Farrer (NSW)
Leader before election
John Gorton
Elected Leader
John Gorton

The Liberal Party of Australia held a leadership spill on 7 November 1969, following the party's poor performance at the federal election on 25 October. Prime Minister John Gorton was re-elected as the party's leader, defeating challengers William McMahon and David Fairbairn.

This is the only time that a prime minister had been challenged for the party leadership directly following on from an election.

== Background ==
The Liberal–Country coalition lost a combined 16 seats at the 1969 federal election, and the Labor Party (under Gough Whitlam) won the two-party-preferred vote. On 2 November, National Development Minister David Fairbairn announced his intention to challenge Gorton for the leadership of the Liberal Party. He was joined the following day by Treasurer William McMahon, who had been deputy leader since 1966. Deputy Prime Minister John McEwen, the leader of the Country Party, announced that his party was willing to work with any of the three candidates; this lifted the veto he had applied to McMahon at the previous leadership ballot in January 1968.

== Candidates ==
- David Fairbairn, Minister for National Development, Member for Farrer
- John Gorton, incumbent Leader, Prime Minister of Australia, Member for Higgins
- William McMahon, incumbent Deputy Leader, Treasurer of Australia, Member for Lowe

== Election ==
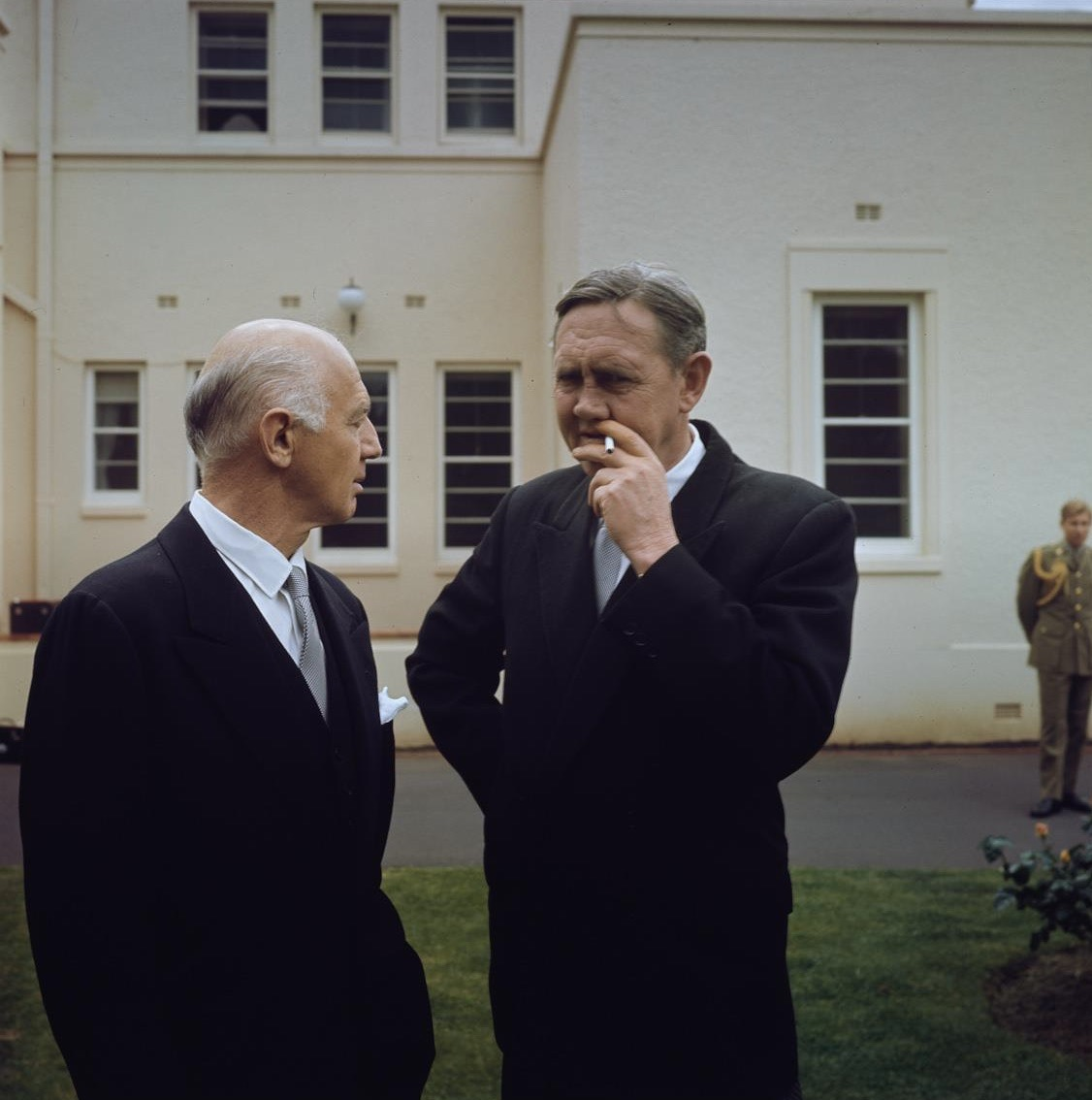
Gorton with William McMahon shortly after the unsuccessful leadership challenge.

The election on 7 November was set for 10 a.m., but delayed by an hour as five MPs travelling from Melbourne were delayed by a faulty aircraft. With Speaker William Aston presiding, the 65 members of the Liberal partyroom took 49 minutes to elect a leader. Gorton won an absolute majority on the first ballot, but the final results were kept secret, with the ballot papers burnt immediately after being tallied. Alan Reid of The Daily Telegraph estimated Gorton had won 34 votes, while The Canberra Times estimated 38 votes; Gorton's supporters claimed up to 40 votes. The deputy leadership was also declared vacant, and McMahon was re-elected over Immigration Minister Billy Snedden and Postmaster-General Alan Hulme with about 35 votes, with Snedden receiving the majority of the rest.

== Results ==
Liberal Party of Australia deputy leadership ballot, 1969

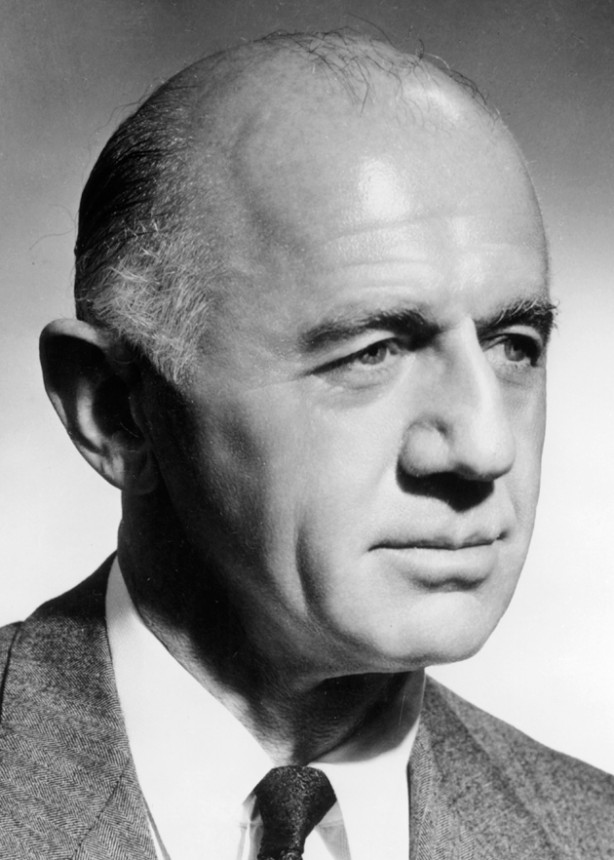

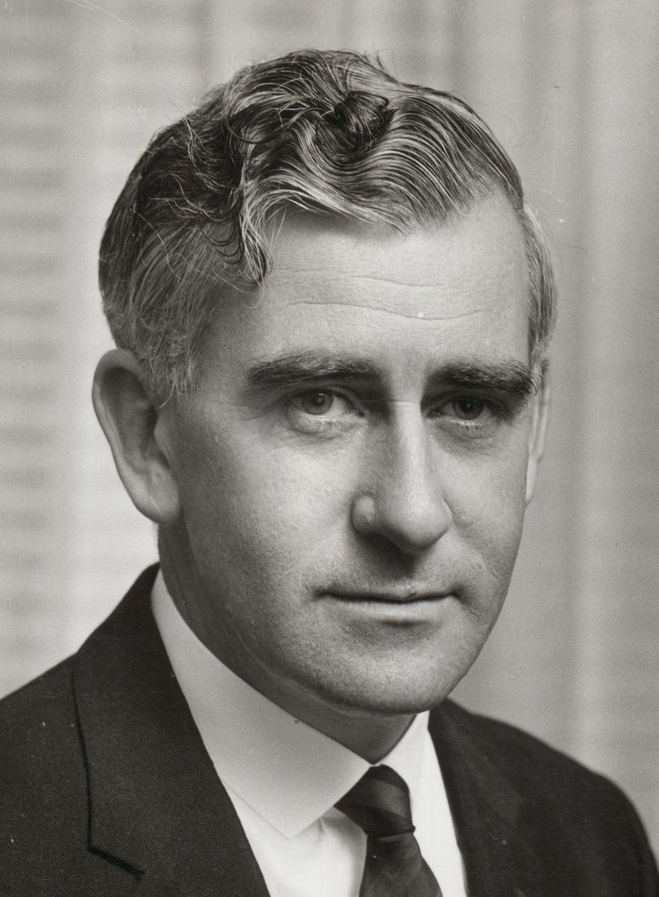

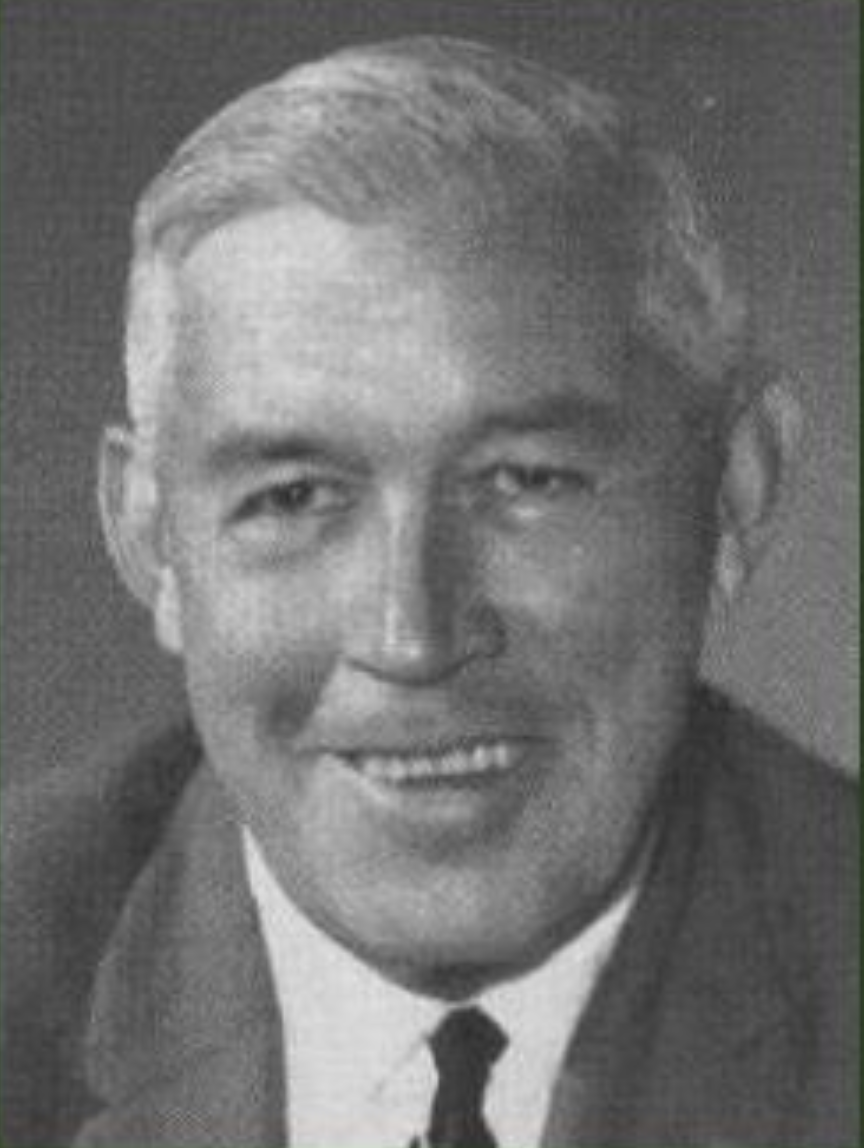
Candidate	William McMahon	Billy Snedden	Alan Hulme
Caucus vote	>33	<33	<33
Deputy Leader before election
William McMahon
Elected Deputy Leader
William McMahon

The following table gives the ballot result:

=== Leadership ballot ===
Name	Votes	Percentage
John Gorton	34–40 (est.)	
William McMahon	20–25 (est.)	
David Fairbairn	5–6 (est.)	

=== Deputy leadership ballot ===
Name	Final ballot	Percentage
William McMahon	>33	
Billy Snedden	<33	
Alan Hulme	<33	

== Aftermath ==
After the challenge, Fairbairn resigned from cabinet and McMahon was demoted to Minister for External Affairs. Gorton resigned in March 1971 after a vote of confidence in his leadership was tied 33-33, and McMahon won the subsequent leadership contest against Billy Snedden.
