= 1968 Liberal Party of Australia leadership election =

Liberal Party of Australia leadership election, 1968
← 1966	9 January 1968	1969 →
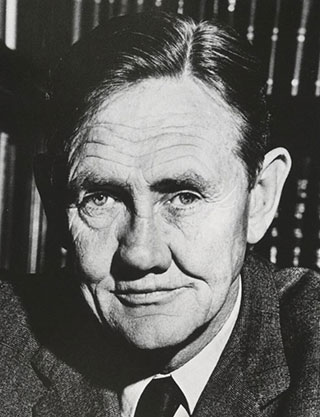

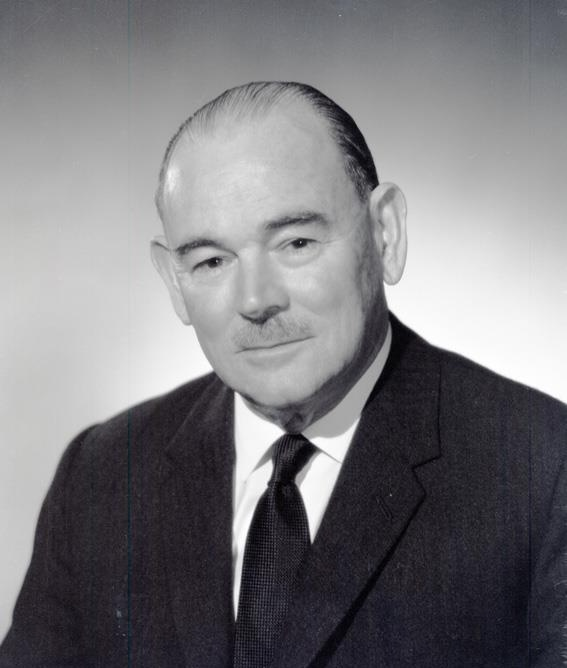

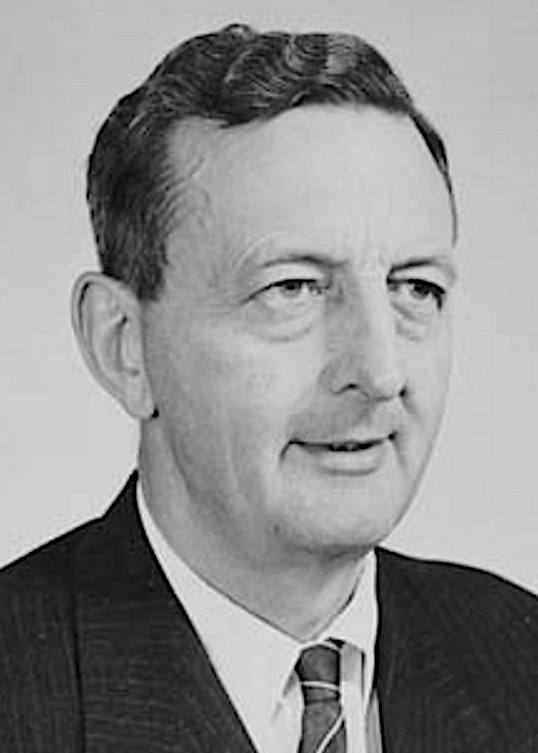

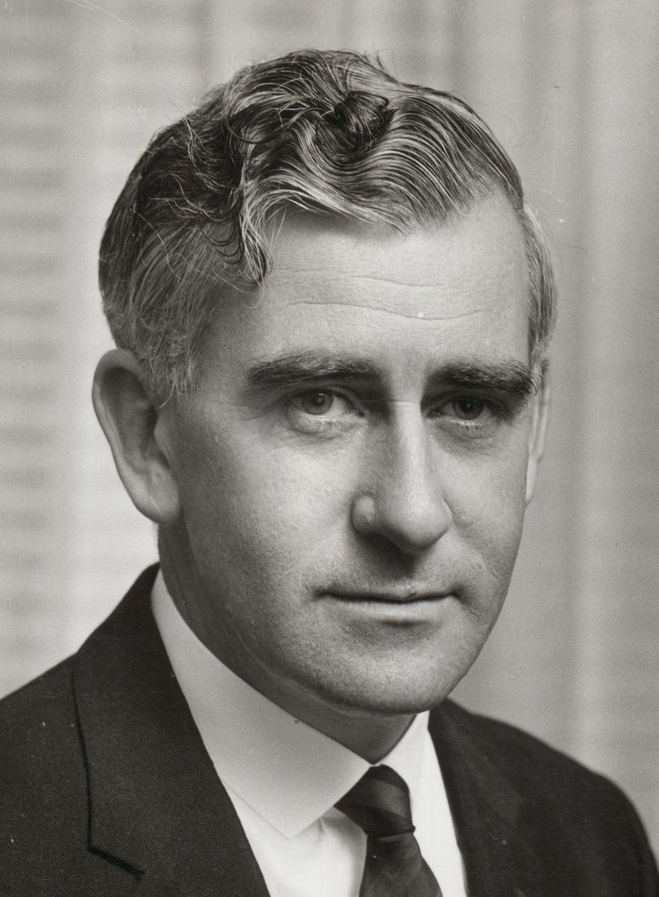
Candidate	John Gorton	Paul Hasluck
First ballot	35 (43.2%)	24 (29.6%)
Second ballot	51 (63.0%)	30 (37.0%)
Seat	Senator (Vic.)	Curtin (WA)
Candidate	Les Bury	Billy Snedden
First ballot	16 (19.8%)	6 (7.4%)
Second ballot	Eliminated	Eliminated
Seat	Wentworth (NSW)	Bruce (Vic.)
Leader before election
Harold Holt
Elected Leader
John Gorton

A leadership election in the Liberal Party of Australia, the party of government in the Parliament of Australia, was held on 9 January 1968. It followed the disappearance and presumed drowning of previous leader Harold Holt, who had been declared dead on 19 December 1967. The contest was won by Senator John Gorton in a party room ballot; he was sworn in as prime minister the following day, replacing caretaker John McEwen.

== Background ==
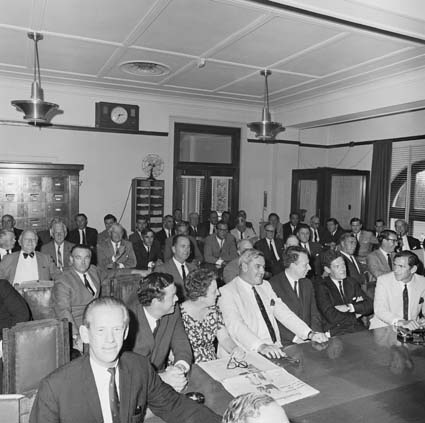
The Liberal Party Room as the election took place.

Incumbent party leader Harold Holt sensationally disappeared while swimming at Cheviot Beach near Portsea on the Mornington Peninsula of Victoria on 17 December 1967. William McMahon, the incumbent Deputy Leader of the Liberal Party was assumed to be his probable successor, however, John McEwen, the interim Prime Minister and leader of the Country Party (the junior Coalition partner), announced that he and his party would not serve in a government led by McMahon. McMahon subsequently withdrew. McEwen himself had been encouraged to remain Prime Minister on a more permanent basis. However, the terms of the Coalition agreement would have required McEwen to defect from the Country Party and seek election as Liberal leader, an option he had never contemplated.

== Candidates ==
- Les Bury, Minister for Labour and National Service, Member for Wentworth
- John Gorton, Minister for Education and Science and Leader of the Government in the Senate, Senator for Victoria
- Paul Hasluck, Minister for External Affairs, Member for Curtin
- Billy Snedden, Minister for Immigration, Member for Bruce

== Potential candidates who declined to run ==
- Allen Fairhall, Minister for Defence, Member for Paterson
- William McMahon, incumbent deputy leader, Treasurer of Australia, Member for Lowe. Widely expected following Holt's disappearance to succeed him as prime minister, but declined to stand when John McEwen, who did not get on well with McMahon, threatened to break the coalition arrangement should he become prime minister. He did eventually become prime minister in 1971, when relations with McEwen had improved and he had recently retired and been replaced by Doug Anthony.
- John McEwen, interim prime minister. Although leader of the Country Party, McEwen was encouraged to stay on a prime minister on a permanent basis, which would have required him to defect and lead the Liberals, which he was not willing to do.

== Results ==
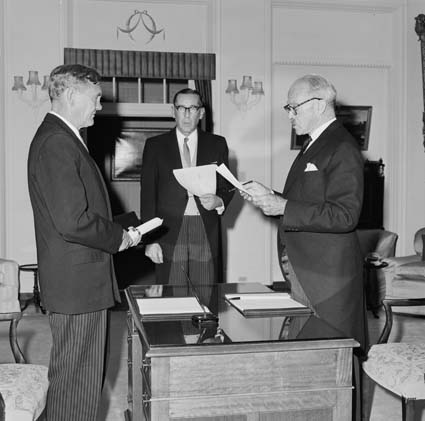
Gorton being sworn in as Prime Minister on 10 January 1968.

The following table gives the ballot results:

Candidate	1st ballot	2nd ballot
John Gorton	35	51
Paul Hasluck	24	30
Les Bury	16	Eliminated
Billy Snedden	6	Eliminated

== Aftermath ==
McMahon was re-elected unopposed as deputy Liberal leader. To date, Gorton is the only Australian Senator to be sworn in as prime minister; he would subsequently win Holt's vacant seat of Higgins at a by-election. Hasluck was later nominated and accepted the position of Governor-General from Gorton in 1969 and Snedden became party leader in December 1972. Bury later served as Treasurer of Australia under both Gorton and McMahon.

== See also ==
- Gorton government
- Other leadership ballots held following the death of a prime minister:
  - 1939 United Australia Party leadership election
  - 1945 Australian Labor Party leadership election
