= 1971 Liberal Party of Australia leadership spill =

- 10 March 1971
- No-confidence motion
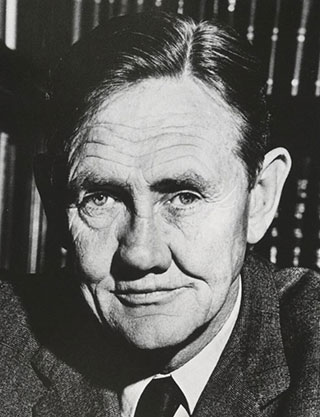

Candidate	John Gorton	No-confidence
Caucus vote	33	33
Percentage	50.0%	50.0%
Seat	Higgins (Vic)	–
- Leadership election
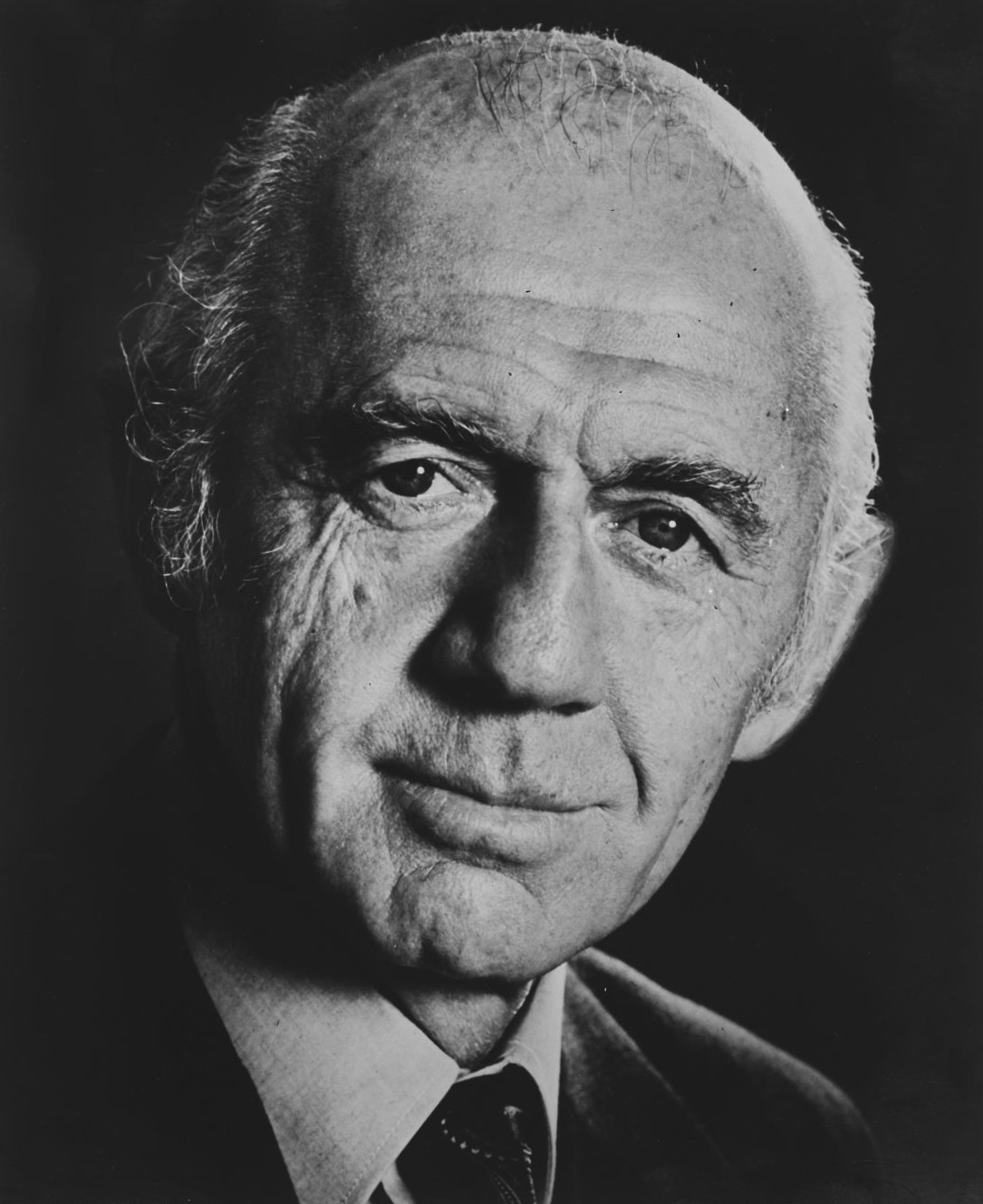

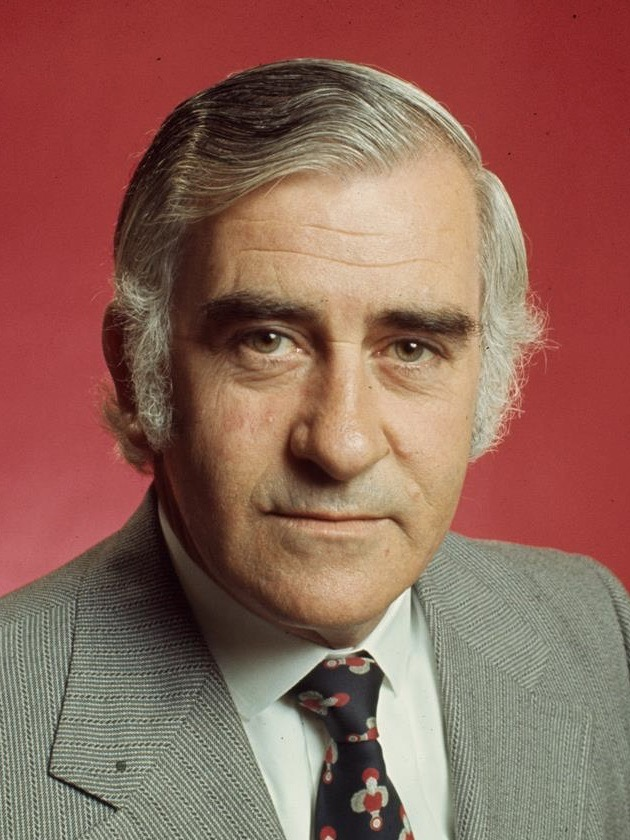
Candidate	William McMahon	Billy Snedden
Caucus vote	40	26
Percentage	60.6%	39.4%
Seat	Lowe (NSW)	Bruce (Vic.)
Leader before election
John Gorton
Elected Leader
William McMahon

The 1971 Liberal Party of Australia leadership spill was held on 10 March 1971 to elect the leader of the Liberal Party of Australia and, ex officio, Prime Minister of Australia.

Sitting prime minister John Gorton called for a vote of confidence in his leadership, which was tied, prompting Gorton to resign. William McMahon subsequently defeated Billy Snedden for the leadership, and was sworn in as prime minister on the same day. Gorton was elected as his deputy, defeating Malcolm Fraser and David Fairbairn.

== Background ==
On 8 March 1971, Defence Minister Malcolm Fraser resigned from cabinet, supposedly over Gorton's failure to support him in a dispute with Chief of the General Staff Thomas Daly. The following day, Fraser gave a statement to the House of Representatives in which he excoriated Gorton and called him "not fit to hold the great office of prime minister". Fraser's actions brought to a head tensions over Gorton's leadership style, particularly what his opponents viewed as his lack of consultation with cabinet. In response, Gorton called a partyroom meeting for 10 a.m. on 10 March.

== Meeting ==
The partyroom meeting began with an open debate on the leadership. Gorton, who was chairing the meeting, then called for a vote of confidence in his leadership, which was tied at 33 votes in favour and 33 votes opposed. Gorton supporter Duke Bonnett was the only absentee (due to illness); had he been present, Gorton would have received 34 votes. Under party rules of the time, Gorton could have retained the leadership. However, Gorton resigned, saying a tie vote was not a vote of confidence. He turned to Foreign Affairs Minister William McMahon and nominated him for the leadership, to the applause of his colleagues; Billy Snedden, the Minister for Labour and National Service, was the only other nominee. McMahon – who had been deputy leader of the Liberal Party since 1966 – defeated Snedden with what The Canberra Times called "a comparatively small majority". The exact result was kept secret, as was the party's practice at the time, but has been estimated to have been 40 votes for McMahon to 26 for Snedden.

After McMahon was elected as leader, there was a second ballot to elect his successor as deputy leader. Somewhat unexpectedly, Gorton put himself forward as a candidate and was elected, defeating Malcolm Fraser and backbencher David Fairbairn. McMahon was sworn in as prime minister by Governor-General Paul Hasluck later that afternoon; his full ministry was not sworn in until 22 March.

== Candidates ==
- William McMahon, incumbent Deputy Leader, Minister for Foreign Affairs, Member for Lowe
- Billy Snedden, Minister for Labour and National Service, Member for Bruce

== Results ==
Liberal Party of Australia deputy leadership ballot, March 1971

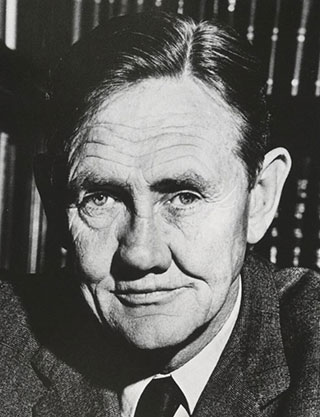

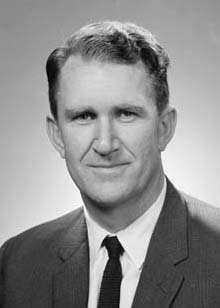

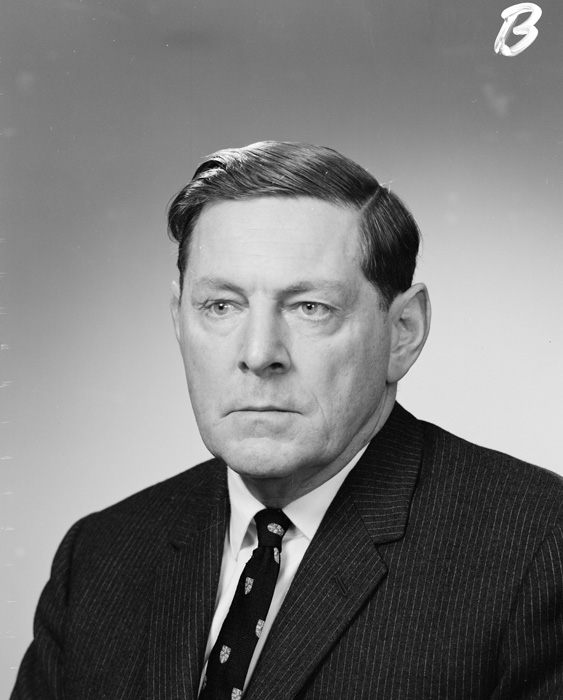
Candidate	John Gorton	Malcolm Fraser	David Fairbairn
Caucus vote	>33	<33	<33
Seat	Higgins (VIC)	Wannon (VIC)	Farrer (NSW)
Deputy Leader before election
William McMahon
Elected Deputy Leader
John Gorton

The following table gives the ballot result:

=== Leadership ballot ===
Name	Votes	Percentage
William McMahon	40 (est.)	
Billy Snedden	26 (est.)	

=== Deputy leadership ballot ===
Name	Final ballot	Percentage
John Gorton	>33	
Malcolm Fraser	<33	
David Fairbairn	<33	

== Aftermath ==
Gorton was sacked from cabinet for disloyalty in August 1971, and subsequently resigned the deputy leadership and was replaced by Snedden. McMahon lost the December 1972 federal election to the Labor Party, led by Gough Whitlam.

Liberal Party of Australia deputy leadership ballot, August 1971
- 18 August 1971
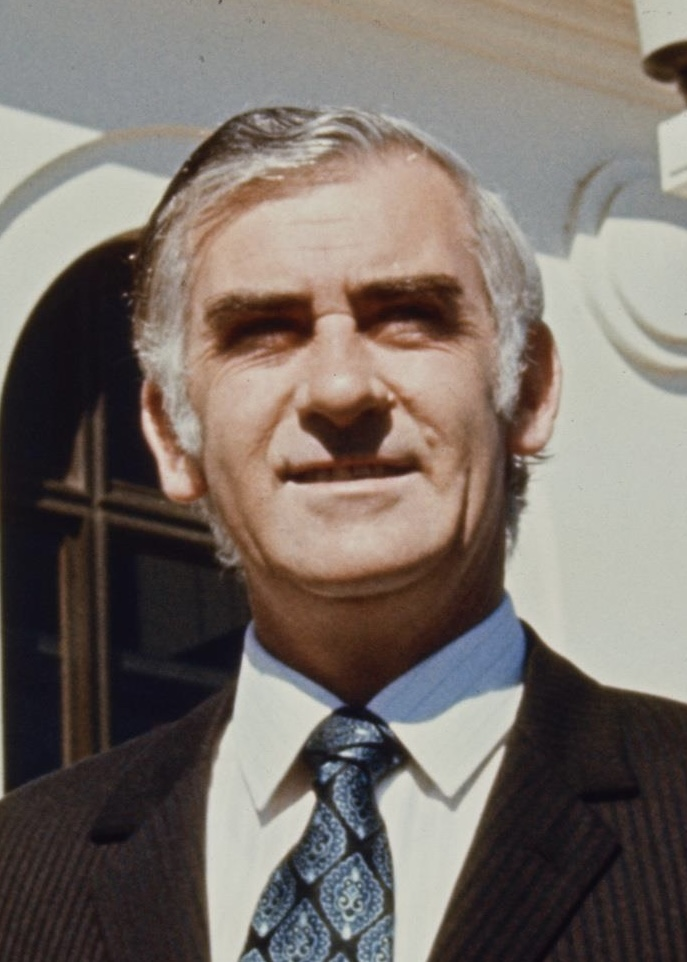

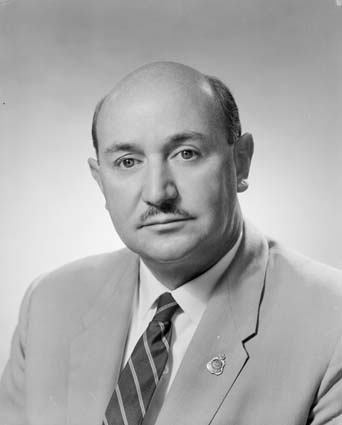
Candidate	Billy Snedden	Reginald Swartz
Fourth ballot	Majority	Minority
Seat	Bruce (VIC)	Darling Downs (QLD)
Deputy Leader before election
John Gorton
Elected Deputy Leader
Billy Snedden

== See also ==
- McMahon government
