= David Fairbairn (politician) =

Australian politician (1917–1994)

The Honourable Sir David Fairbairn KBE, DFC
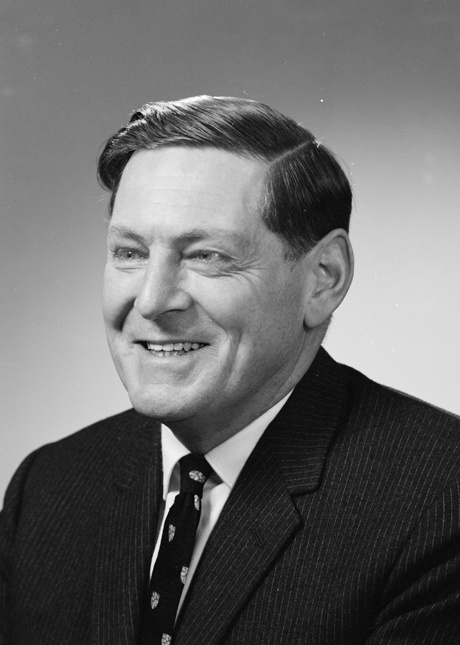
- Fairbairn in 1969

Minister for Defence
- In office 13 August 1971 – 5 December 1972
- Prime Minister: William McMahon
- Preceded by: John Gorton
- Succeeded by: Lance Barnard

Minister for Education and Science
- In office 22 March 1971 – 20 August 1971
- Prime Minister: William McMahon
- Preceded by: Nigel Bowen
- Succeeded by: Malcolm Fraser

Minister for National Development
- In office 10 June 1964 – 12 November 1969
- Prime Minister: Robert Menzies; Harold Holt; John McEwen; John Gorton
- Preceded by: Bill Spooner
- Succeeded by: Reg Swartz

Minister for Air
- In office 27 July 1962 – 10 June 1964
- Prime Minister: Robert Menzies
- Preceded by: Les Bury
- Succeeded by: Peter Howson

Member of the Australian Parliament for Farrer
- In office 10 December 1949 – 11 November 1975
- Preceded by: New seat
- Succeeded by: Wal Fife

Personal details
- Born: 3 March 1917 Claygate, Surrey, England
- Died: 1 June 1994 (aged 77) Canberra, Australia
- Party: Liberal
- Spouse: Ruth Harrison (m. 1945)
- Relations: George Fairbairn (grandfather); Edmund Jowett (grandfather)
- Education: Jesus College, Cambridge
- Occupation: Pastoralist

Military service
- Allegiance: Australia
- Branch/service: Citizen Military Forces; Royal Australian Air Force
- Years of service: 1939–1945
- Rank: Flight Lieutenant
- Unit: 21st Light Horse Riverina Regiment (1939–41); No. 79 Squadron (1941–45)
- Battles/wars: World War II
- Awards: Distinguished Flying Cross

Sir David Eric Fairbairn, KBE, DFC (3 March 1917 – 1 June 1994) was an Australian politician. He was a member of the Liberal Party and served in the House of Representatives from 1949 to 1975. He held ministerial office as Minister for Air (1962–1964), National Development (1964–1969), Education and Science (1971), and Defence (1971–1972).

== Early life ==
Fairbairn was born on 3 March 1917 in Claygate, Surrey, England. He was the son of Australian parents Marjorie Rosa (née Jowett) and Clive Prell Fairbairn. His father, a journalist from a prominent pastoral family, was serving with the Scots Guard at the time of his birth.

Fairbairn had political ties on both sides of his family. His grandfathers George Fairbairn and Edmund Jowett were federal MPs, while his father's cousin James Fairbairn was a federal government minister until his death in the 1940 Canberra air disaster.

Fairbairn's parents returned to Australia in 1918 and he spent his early years at his father's grazing property at Woomargama, New South Wales. He received his early education from governesses, then attended Geelong Grammar School as a boarder from 1927 to 1934. He matriculated to Jesus College, Cambridge, previously attended by his father and grandfather, graduating Bachelor of Arts in 1938 and proceeding to Master of Arts by seniority in 1944. He rowed in the first eight of the Jesus College Boat Club and "just missed selection for the Cambridge first crew" in 1938.

In 1939, Fairbairn returned to Australia and assumed management of "Dunraven", the property at Woomargama. Over the following decades he "raised the carrying capacity from less than one sheep to more than four sheep per acre".

== World War II ==
Fairbairn was a member of the Citizen Military Forces as part of the 21st Light Horse Regiment (Riverina Horse) from 1939 to 1941. He enlisted in the Royal Australian Air Force (RAAF) as an aircrew member in February 1941. He subsequently trained as a pilot and was commissioned as a pilot officer in September 1941.

In March 1942, Fairbairn was sent to Britain and attached to the No. 4 Squadron RAF, flying Mustangs on low-level reconnaissance missions over Europe. He was reassigned to No. 140 Squadron RAF in October 1942 where he "completed high-level mapping preparatory to D-Day, and was one of the first to photograph a V-2 rocket site". In January 1944 he was awarded the Distinguished Flying Cross, with the citation describing him as "an extremely keen and able deputy flight commander" and crediting him with having destroyed "five locomotives, one ship and attacked many troop concentrations".

Fairbairn was promoted to flight lieutenant in September 1943 and returned to Australia in January 1944. In June 1944 he was posted to No. 79 Squadron RAAF and assigned to Momote Airport, supporting the Manus Naval Base and actions on the New Guinea campaign. He secured early demobilisation in January 1945.

== Political career ==
=== Early years ===
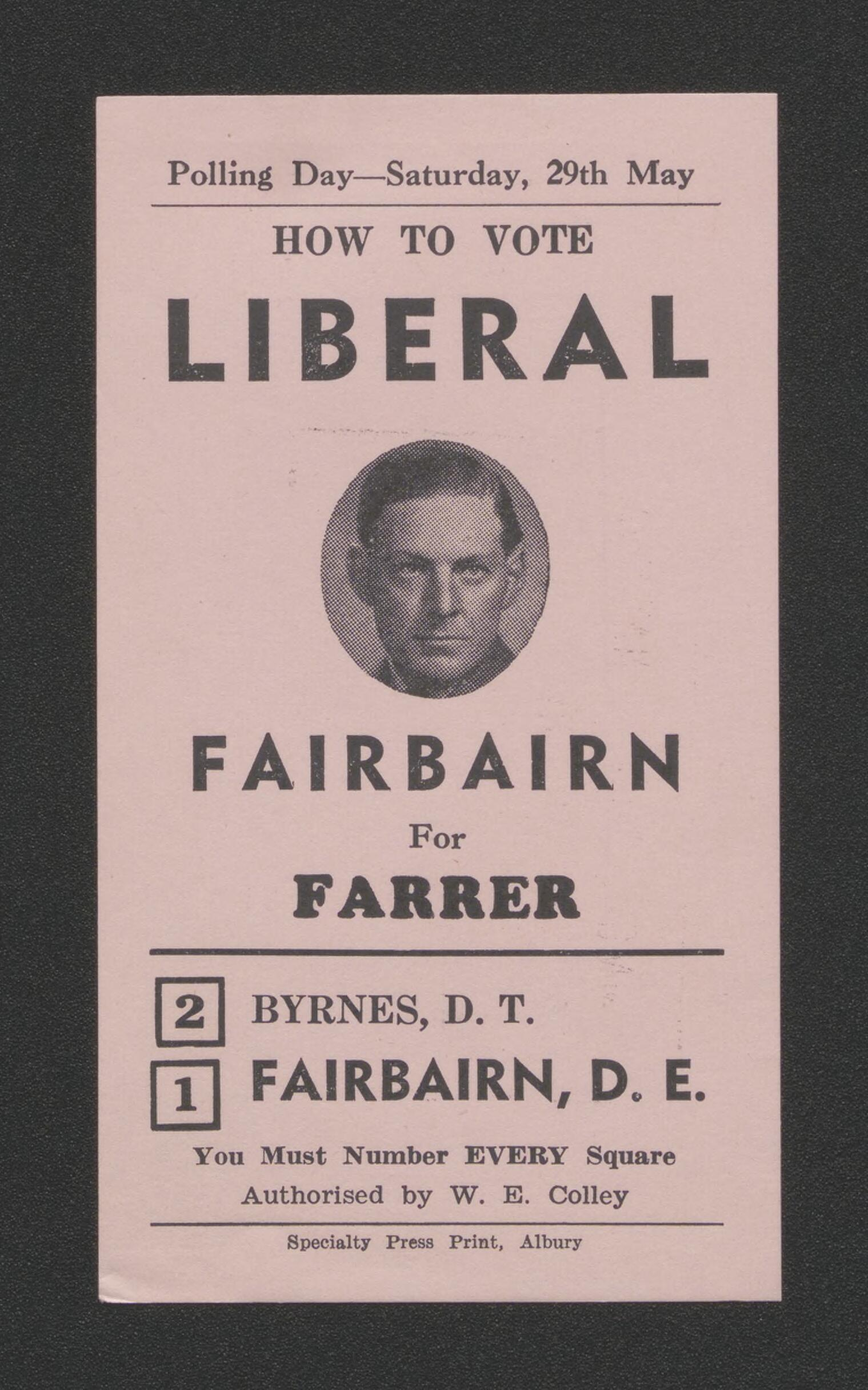
Campaign material used by Fairbairn at the 1955 federal election

Fairbairn joined the Country Party after the end of World War II, but later switched to the Liberal Party. He was encouraged to stand for parliament by party officials and at the 1949 federal election was elected to the newly created seat of Farrer in the House of Representatives. He was elevated to the ministry in 1962 as Minister for Air in the Menzies government.

=== National development minister, 1964–1969 ===
Fairbairn was promoted to cabinet in June 1964 as Minister for National Development, a portfolio covering energy, forestry, minerals, and water policy (including the Ord River Scheme in Western Australia). After Menzies' retirement he remained in the national development portfolio under Harold Holt and John Gorton. As with Gorton, Fairbairn was a strong proponent of nuclear power for Australia. His department was responsible for the Australian Atomic Energy Commission and he made the initial cabinet submissions for the Jervis Bay Nuclear Power Plant, which also anticipated the "retention of fissable material" for defence purposes. However, according to Ainsley Gotto and Ann Moyal his personal grasp of nuclear technology was limited and his cabinet colleague Bill Wentworth was more influential on the development of policy.

As national development minister, Fairbairn played a significant role in formulating government policy on iron ore mining in Western Australia, which had rapidly expanded after the lifting of the export embargo in 1960. Following a collapse in the iron ore price in 1965 he secured cabinet support to refuse approval for Hamersley Iron to sell iron ore pellets to Japan, "the first time that an Australian government had intervened to stop a commercial deal of such magnitude except for defence reasons". In 1966, the Holt government introduced "price guidelines" (effectively a price floor) for iron ore, but these were relaxed by Fairbairn the following year. The removal of price controls was said to have significantly increased production levels and allowed Hamersley to become one of the world's largest iron ore producers.

=== Leadership challenge and aftermath ===
Fairbairn supported Gorton's election as party leader, but later became "disillusioned by the prime minister's maverick style". After the 1969 election, he unsuccessfully challenged Gorton for the leadership (along with William McMahon), and then resigned from the ministry, saying: "I have given deep thought and consideration to this decision. I have made it reluctantly. My sole concern in coming to it is the future of the Liberal Party, the Government and the Nation." According to Ian Sinclair, he was opposed to Gorton's centralism and in particular, his attempt to claim of sovereignty over Australia's territorial waters and continental shelf for the Commonwealth.

Fairbairn became Minister for Education and Science in March 1971 in the McMahon Ministry and Minister for Defence from August 1971 to the government's defeat in 1972 election. He had announced his retirement in 1975 but the dismissal of the Whitlam Government meant that his retirement came earlier than expected at the subsequent 1975 election.

== Ambassador to the Netherlands ==
From 1977 to 1980, Fairbairn was Australia's Ambassador to the Netherlands. Media reported that the posting "deeply perturbed" staff of the Department of Foreign Affairs, which came at a time when the department was being forced to reduce its overseas representation significantly.

== Personal life ==
In 1945, Fairbairn married Ruth Harrison (née Robertson). She had one daughter with her first husband, who had been killed in World War II. They had another two daughters together.

Fairbairn died in Woden Valley Hospital in Canberra on 1 June 1994, aged 77.

== Honours ==
Fairbairn was awarded a Distinguished Flying Cross in 1944, and made a Knight Commander of the Order of the British Empire in 1977.

== Notes ==
Political offices
Preceded by Les Bury	Minister for the Air; 1962–1964	Succeeded by Peter Howson
Preceded by Bill Spooner	Minister for National Development; 1964–1969	Succeeded by Reginald Swartz
Preceded by Nigel Bowen	Minister for Education and Science; 1971	Succeeded by Malcolm Fraser
Preceded by John Gorton	Minister for Defence; 1971–1972	Succeeded by Lance Barnard
Parliament of Australia
New division	Member for Farrer; 1949–1975	Succeeded by Wal Fife
Diplomatic posts
Preceded by Frederick Blakeney	Australian Ambassador to the Netherlands; 1977–1980	Succeeded by James Cumes
