= 1968 Higgins by-election =

Australian federal by-election

← 1966	24 February 1968	1969 →

Division of Higgins in the House of Representatives
- Turnout: 35,158 (84.87%)
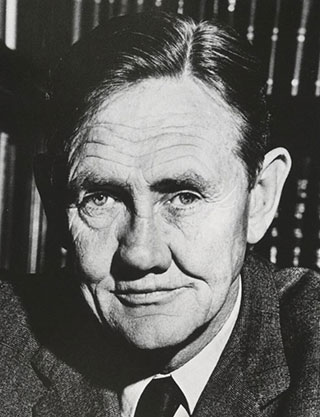

	First party	Second party
Candidate	John Gorton	David Bennett
Party	Liberal	Labor
Popular vote	24,067	9,601
Percentage	69.40%	27.69%
Swing	▲6.12	▲2.53
MP before election
Harold Holt
Liberal
Elected MP
John Gorton
Liberal

A by-election was held for the Australian House of Representatives seat of Higgins on 24 February 1968. It was triggered by the presumed drowning death of the Prime Minister and Liberal Party MP Harold Holt on 17 December 1967.

== Background ==
On 15 January 1968, Speaker William Aston stated that there was conclusive evidence that Holt had died, and that a writ would be issued for the by-election. Senator John Gorton, who had been elected party leader and prime minister by his party colleagues on 9 January, was preselected unopposed to run for the Liberal Party on 31 January. The Australian Labor Party nominated David Bennett, a research officer with the Australian Council for Educational Research, whilst the Democratic Labor Party, who had received 11.56% of the vote at the November 1966 election in the seat, opted not to contest the election. The other two candidates were Dr Leonard Webber for the Australia Reform Movement, and a Sydney journalist, Frank Courtis.

Gorton won the by-election for the Liberals with an increased primary vote.

It remains the only time in which a sitting prime minister was a candidate in a by-election.

== Results ==
1968 Higgins by-election
Party	Candidate	Votes	%	±%
Liberal	John Gorton	24,067	69.40	+6.12
Labor	David Bennett	9,601	27.69	+2.53
Reform Movement	Leonard Weber	662	1.91	+1.91
Independent	Frank Courtis	347	1.00	+1.00
Total formal votes		34,677	98.63	+1.39
Informal votes		481	1.37	–1.39
Turnout		35,158	84.87	–9.45
Liberal hold		Swing	+6.12	

== See also ==
- 1968 Liberal Party of Australia leadership election
- List of Australian federal by-elections
