= Ainsley Gotto =

Australian public servant and entrepreneur (1946–2018)

- Gotto in 1969
- Born: 14 February 1946; Annerley, Queensland, Australia
- Died: 25 February 2018 (aged 72); Woollahra, New South Wales, Australia
- Education: Canberra Technical College
- Occupations: Public servant, secretary, stage actress, entrepreneur
- Known for: Private secretary to Prime Minister John Gorton

Ainsley Gotto (14 February 1946 – 25 February 2018) was an Australian public servant and entrepreneur, who was the private secretary to John Gorton, the prime minister of Australia in the late 1960s.

== Early life ==
Gotto was born in the Brisbane suburb of Annerley on 14 February 1946. Her parents were Sidney Gotto, a flight lieutenant in the Royal Australian Air Force, and his wife, Lesley Webster.

She lived with her parents and went to school in Melbourne, then lived in London before returning to Melbourne. In 1961, the family moved to Canberra, where Ainsley studied a secretarial course at Canberra Technical College, qualifying for her certificate with the highest typing speed in the class. Gotto also worked as a stage actress for the Canberra Repertory Society, appearing in the lead roles of several plays, but gave up amateur theatre to concentrate on her secretarial career.

Gotto began work as a typist at the Department of Immigration, but left after a few months to work for a private firm. After a year, she returned to government work at the Trade Commissioner Service. In 1966, Gotto was appointed as secretary to William Aston, then government chief whip. She stayed on to work for Dudley Erwin when he replaced Aston as whip.

== Secretary to John Gorton ==
In January 1968, Gotto, then aged 21, was announced as the new personal private secretary to the prime minister, John Gorton.

On 13 February 1969, Gorton appointed Gotto's former boss, Dudley Erwin, as Minister for Air, in the reshuffle following Paul Hasluck's appointment as Governor-General. Gorton subsequently appointed Gotto as principal private secretary, and came to rely on her for political advice. On 11 November 1969, Erwin was left out of Gorton's second ministry. On 13 November, Erwin's explanation for his dismissal was: "It wiggles, it's shapely and its name is Ainsley Gotto."

In his biography of Gorton, Sir John Gorton: He Did It His Way, Ian Hancock argues that although Gotto had some influence over the prime minister, that was over-estimated and resented by his senior colleagues. In Jenny Hocking's biography of Gough Whitlam, Hocking mentioned that those looking for scandal between Gorton and Gotto were "looking in the wrong place", and that Gotto was in fact in a relationship with Race Mathews, her counterpart in Whitlam's office. Most of the media were aware of the relationship but did not report on it. Mathews also told Whitlam, who tolerated the relationship on the proviso there was no "pillow talk".

When Gorton stepped down as prime minister in March 1971 and became Minister for Defence, Gotto stayed in his service, but resigned from the public service in 1972. She later returned to work for Gorton in his retirement, and helped his widow, Lady Nancy Gorton, with arrangements after his death in 2002.

== Later life and death ==
After leaving the Public Service, Gotto worked for Bill Pollock at the Canadian recruitment company Drake International in Australia between 1972 and 1978. She then returned to Britain where she worked at personnel agencies in London, and later in Monaco. In the early 1980s, she worked as a television presenter for Granada Television in Britain.

Gotto worked in a variety of business ventures including an interior design consultancy on the Gold Coast, and her own company, Ainsley Gotto International. She served as the National President of the Australian chapter of Women Chiefs of Enterprises International, a non-profit organisation for women entrepreneurs, from 2001 to 2003. In early 2008 she returned to Parliament House as chief of staff to shadow finance minister, Senator Helen Coonan.

Gotto married lawyer Nick Carson in July 1993 and lived in Double Bay, Sydney. The marriage ended in divorce in 2007.

In 2015, Gotto donated her official and personal papers to the National Library of Australia, to be released only on her death or if she agreed to their earlier release.

Gotto died eleven days after her 72nd birthday, at Wolper Jewish Hospital in Woollahra, Sydney, on 25 February 2018, due to complications from cancer.
