= 1966 Liberal Party of Australia leadership election =

Liberal Party of Australia leadership election, 1966
- 20 January 1966
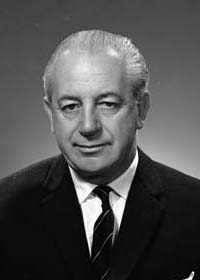
| Candidate | Harold Holt |
| First ballot | Unopposed |
| Seat | Higgins (Vic.) |
Leader before election
Robert Menzies
Elected Leader
Harold Holt

The Liberal Party of Australia held a leadership ballot on 20 January 1966, following the resignation of Robert Menzies. Incumbent deputy leader Harold Holt was elected unopposed as his successor, and was sworn in as prime minister on 26 January. William McMahon defeated Paul Hasluck in the ballot to replace Holt as deputy leader.

== Background ==
Robert Menzies had been leader of the Liberal Party since its foundation in 1945, and prime minister since 1949. There had been persistent rumours that he would retire since 1951. He turned seventy-one in December 1965, and on 26 December informed his press secretary, Tony Eggleton, that he would leave office early the following year. Holt was allegedly tipped off that Menzies was going to stand down, and, on 19 January 1966 Menzies told cabinet of his intentions. The following day called a joint meeting of the Coalition (the Liberal Party and the Country Party) during which he announced his resignation.

== Leadership election ==
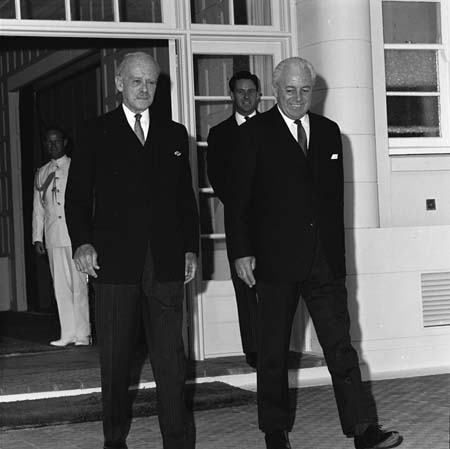
Harold Holt moments after being sworn in as Prime Minister on 26 January 1966.

About 15 minutes after the joint meeting ended, the Liberal Party met separately to elect Menzies' successor. Treasurer Harold Holt, the party's deputy leader since 1956, was elected unopposed. According to Holt's biographer, Tom Frame, "the change of Liberal Party leadership was achieved with remarkable ease and without any destabilising lobbying [...] there were not discontented rivals to provoke either ministerial resistance or backbench revolt". Holt told his wife Zara that he was proud to have become prime minister "without stepping over anyone's body".

== Deputy leadership election ==
As Holt had assumed the leadership, there was also a vote held for the deputy leadership. William McMahon, the Minister for Labour and National Service, won a close vote over Paul Hasluck, the Minister for External Affairs. There were apparently multiple ballots, as voting took 40 minutes to complete, but the end tallies were kept secret. Holt and his new ministry were not sworn in until 26 January, with the delay partially due to the death and funeral of Shane Paltridge, the Minister for Defence.
