= Leader of the Liberal Party of Australia =

Leader of the Liberal Party
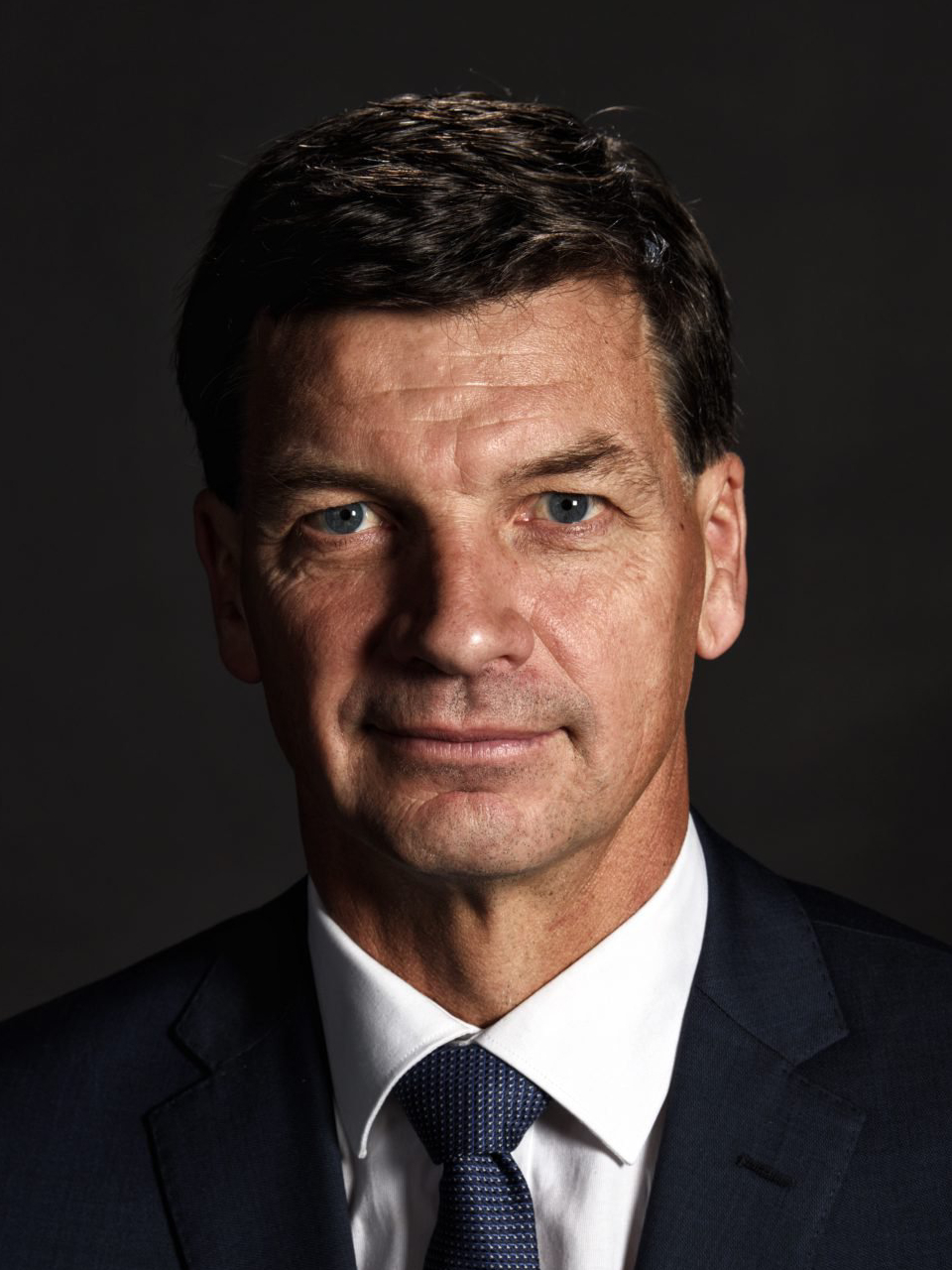
- Incumbent; Angus Taylor since 13 February 2026
- Type: Party leader
- Member of: Parliamentary Liberal Party; Liberal Party Federal Council
- Term length: No fixed term
- Constituting instrument: Clause 14.2, Constitution of the Federal Liberal Party
- Inaugural holder: Robert Menzies
- Formation: 21 February 1945
- Unofficial names: Leader of the Liberal–National Coalition
- Deputy: Deputy Leader of the Liberal Party

The leader of the Liberal Party, also known as leader of the Parliamentary Liberal Party, is the highest office within the Liberal Party of Australia, as well as within the Liberal–National Coalition. The incumbent leader is Angus Taylor, who was elected on 13 February 2026.

== History ==
The Liberal Party leadership was first held by Robert Menzies, a former leader of the United Australia Party and co–founder of the Liberal Party along with eighteen political organisations and groups.

Following the ousting of two Liberal prime ministers in three years, the then leader, Scott Morrison, proposed a new threshold to trigger a Liberal Party leadership change if the party was in government, requiring two-thirds of the party room to vote to initiate a spill motion. The change was agreed to at an hour-long party room meeting on the evening of 3 December 2018. Morrison said the changes, which were drafted with feedback from former prime ministers John Howard and Tony Abbott, would only apply to those who led the party to victory at a federal election.

== Role ==
Since the days of Menzies, the Liberal Party has either been in government in a coalition or in opposition to Labor. Thus, the leader of the Liberal Party has always served as either the Prime Minister of Australia or the Leader of the Opposition. Furthermore, the leader picks the Cabinet and is also the leader of the Coalition. The Liberal Party has only had one leader of the party from the Senate, John Gorton, for a brief period in January 1968 before he resigned from the Senate to contest the Higgins by-election in February 1968.

== Leaders of the Liberal Party ==
Note: the right-hand column does not allocate height proportional to time in office.

List of leaders (including acting leaders) since 1945
No.	Leader (birth–death)	Portrait	Electorate	Took office	Left office	Election contested	Prime Minister (term)
1	Robert Menzies (1894–1978)		Kooyong, Vic.	21 February 1945	20 January 1966	1946; 1949; 1951; 1954; 1955; 1958; 1961; 1963	Curtin (1941–1945)
1	Robert Menzies (1894–1978)		Kooyong, Vic.	21 February 1945	20 January 1966	1946; 1949; 1951; 1954; 1955; 1958; 1961; 1963	Forde (1945)
1	Robert Menzies (1894–1978)		Kooyong, Vic.	21 February 1945	20 January 1966	1946; 1949; 1951; 1954; 1955; 1958; 1961; 1963	Chifley (1945–1949)
1	Robert Menzies (1894–1978)		Kooyong, Vic.	21 February 1945	20 January 1966	1946; 1949; 1951; 1954; 1955; 1958; 1961; 1963	Himself (1949–1966)
2	Harold Holt (1908–1967)		Higgins, Vic.	20 January 1966 (unopposed)	17 December 1967 (died in office)	1966	Himself (1966–1967)
3	John Gorton (1911–2002)		Senator for Victoria (9 January – 1 February); Higgins, Vic.	9 January 1968 (elected)	10 March 1971	1969	McEwen (Note: After the Disappearance of Harold Holt, the Deputy Prime Minister, McEwen, took over as a caretaker until the leadership election of the Liberal Party was concluded.) (1967–1968)
3	John Gorton (1911–2002)		Senator for Victoria (9 January – 1 February); Higgins, Vic.	9 January 1968 (elected)	10 March 1971	1969	Himself (1967–1971)
4	William McMahon (1908–1988)		Lowe, NSW	10 March 1971 (elected)	20 December 1972	1972	Himself (1971–1972)
4	William McMahon (1908–1988)		Lowe, NSW	10 March 1971 (elected)	20 December 1972	1972	Whitlam (1972–1975)
5	Billy Snedden (1926–1987)		Bruce, Vic.	20 December 1972 (elected)	21 March 1975	1974	Whitlam (1972–1975)
6	Malcolm Fraser (1930–2015)		Wannon, Vic.	21 March 1975 (elected)	11 March 1983	1975; 1977; 1980; 1983	Whitlam (1972–1975)
6	Malcolm Fraser (1930–2015)		Wannon, Vic.	21 March 1975 (elected)	11 March 1983	1975; 1977; 1980; 1983	Himself (1975–1983)
6	Malcolm Fraser (1930–2015)		Wannon, Vic.	21 March 1975 (elected)	11 March 1983	1975; 1977; 1980; 1983	Hawke (1983–1991)
7	Andrew Peacock (1939–2021)		Kooyong, Vic.	11 March 1983 (elected)	5 September 1985	1984	Hawke (1983–1991)
8	John Howard (b. 1939)		Bennelong, NSW	5 September 1985 (elected)	9 May 1989	1987	Hawke (1983–1991)
(7)	Andrew Peacock (1939–2021)		Kooyong, Vic.	9 May 1989 (elected)	3 April 1990	1990	Hawke (1983–1991)
9	John Hewson (b. 1946)		Wentworth, NSW	3 April 1990 (elected)	23 May 1994	1993	Hawke (1983–1991)
9	John Hewson (b. 1946)		Wentworth, NSW	3 April 1990 (elected)	23 May 1994	1993	Keating (1991–1996)
10	Alexander Downer (b. 1951)		Mayo, SA	23 May 1994 (elected)	30 January 1995	None	Keating (1991–1996)
(8)	John Howard (b. 1939)		Bennelong, NSW	30 January 1995 (unopposed)	29 November 2007	1996; 1998; 2001; 2004; 2007	Keating (1991–1996)
(8)	John Howard (b. 1939)		Bennelong, NSW	30 January 1995 (unopposed)	29 November 2007	1996; 1998; 2001; 2004; 2007	Himself (1996–2007)
11	Brendan Nelson (b. 1958)		Bradfield, NSW	29 November 2007 (elected)	16 September 2008	None	Rudd (2007–2010)
12	Malcolm Turnbull (b. 1954)		Wentworth, NSW	16 September 2008 (elected)	1 December 2009	None	Rudd (2007–2010)
13	Tony Abbott (b. 1957)		Warringah, NSW	1 December 2009 (elected)	14 September 2015	2010; 2013	Rudd (2007–2010)
13	Tony Abbott (b. 1957)		Warringah, NSW	1 December 2009 (elected)	14 September 2015	2010; 2013	Gillard (2010–2013)
13	Tony Abbott (b. 1957)		Warringah, NSW	1 December 2009 (elected)	14 September 2015	2010; 2013	Rudd (2013)
13	Tony Abbott (b. 1957)		Warringah, NSW	1 December 2009 (elected)	14 September 2015	2010; 2013	Himself (2013–2015)
(12)	Malcolm Turnbull (b. 1954)		Wentworth, NSW	14 September 2015 (elected)	24 August 2018	2016	Himself (2015–2018)
14	Scott Morrison (b. 1968)		Cook, NSW	24 August 2018 (elected)	30 May 2022	2019; 2022	Himself (2018–2022)
14	Scott Morrison (b. 1968)		Cook, NSW	24 August 2018 (elected)	30 May 2022	2019; 2022	Albanese (2022–incumbent)
15	Peter Dutton (b. 1970)		Dickson, Qld.	30 May 2022 (unopposed)	5 May 2025	2025	Albanese (2022–incumbent)
16	Sussan Ley (b. 1961)		Farrer, NSW	13 May 2025 (elected)	13 February 2026	None	Albanese (2022–incumbent)
17	Angus Taylor (b. 1966)		Hume, NSW	13 February 2026 (elected)	Incumbent	None	Albanese (2022–incumbent)

=== Federal leaders by time in office ===
This list ranks federal leaders of the Liberal Party by their time in office. Leaders that also served as Prime Minister are in bold. Where leaders served non-consecutive terms, their total time as leader is ranked together.

Rank	No.	Leader	Time in office
1	1st	**Robert Menzies**	20 years, 333 days
2	8th	**John Howard**	16 years, 184 days
3	6th	**Malcolm Fraser**	7 years, 355 days
4	13th	**Tony Abbott**	5 years, 287 days
5	12th	**Malcolm Turnbull**	4 years, 59 days
6	9th	John Hewson	4 years, 50 days
7	14th	**Scott Morrison**	3 years, 279 days
8	7th	Andrew Peacock	3 years, 142 days
9	3rd	**John Gorton**	3 years, 59 days
10	15th	Peter Dutton	2 years, 338 days
11	5th	Billy Snedden	2 years, 91 days
12	2nd	**Harold Holt**	1 year, 333 days
13	4th	**William McMahon**	1 year, 270 days
14	11th	Brendan Nelson	292 days
15	17th	Angus Taylor	276 days (Note: As of 16 November 2026)
16	16th	Sussan Ley	276 days
17	10th	Alexander Downer	252 days

=== Federal deputy leaders ===
#	Name	State	Term start	Term end	Duration	Leader(s)
1	Eric Harrison	New South Wales	21 February 1945	26 September 1956	11 years, 218 days	Robert Menzies
2	Harold Holt	Victoria	26 September 1956	20 January 1966	9 years, 116 days	Robert Menzies
3	William McMahon	New South Wales	20 January 1966	10 March 1971	5 years, 49 days	Harold Holt; John Gorton
4	John Gorton	Victoria	10 March 1971	16 August 1971	159 days	William McMahon
5	Billy Snedden	Victoria	18 August 1971	20 December 1972	1 year, 124 days	William McMahon
6	Phillip Lynch	Victoria	20 December 1972	8 April 1982	9 years, 109 days	Billy Snedden; Malcolm Fraser
7	John Howard	New South Wales	8 April 1982	5 September 1985	3 years, 150 days	Malcolm Fraser; Andrew Peacock
8	Neil Brown	Victoria	5 September 1985	17 July 1987	1 year, 315 days	John Howard
9	Andrew Peacock	Victoria	17 July 1987	9 May 1989	1 year, 296 days	John Howard
10	Fred Chaney (Note: From 23 May 1989 to 24 March 1990 (305 days), Wal Fife occupied the unique position of "Deputy Leader of the Liberal Party in the House of Representatives". This was because Fred Chaney was a member of the Senate during that time; it was necessary to elect a temporary House-only deputy for procedural reasons.)	Western Australia	9 May 1989	3 April 1990	329 days	Andrew Peacock
11	Peter Reith	Victoria	24 March 1990	13 March 1993	2 years, 354 days	John Hewson
12	Michael Wooldridge	Victoria	13 March 1993	23 May 1994	1 year, 71 days	John Hewson
13	Peter Costello	Victoria	23 May 1994	29 November 2007	13 years, 190 days	Alexander Downer; John Howard
14	Julie Bishop	Western Australia	29 November 2007	24 August 2018	10 years, 268 days	Brendan Nelson; Malcolm Turnbull; Tony Abbott
15	Josh Frydenberg	Victoria	24 August 2018	30 May 2022	3 years, 279 days	Scott Morrison
16	Sussan Ley	New South Wales	30 May 2022	13 May 2025	2 years, 348 days	Peter Dutton; Herself (acting)
17	Ted O'Brien	Queensland	13 May 2025	13 February 2026	276 days	Sussan Ley
**18**	**Jane Hume** (Note: The position of "Deputy Leader in the House of Representatives" is held by Andrew Hastie. As Hume is a member of the Senate, it was necessary to elect a House-only deputy for procedural reasons. This is a similar instance to the position of "Deputy Leader of the Liberal Party in the House of Representatives", used from 1989 to 1990.)	**Victoria**	**13 February 2026**	**Incumbent**	**276 days**	**Angus Taylor**

=== Leaders in the Senate ===
Leader	Term began	Term ended	Portfolio	Status	Parliamentary leader	Term in office	Deputy
Neil O'Sullivan	21 February 1950	8 December 1958	Trade and Customs (to Jan 1956); the Navy (Jan–Oct 1956); Attorney-General (from Aug 1956); V-P Exec. Council (from Oct 1956)	Government	Menzies	8 years, 290 days	
Bill Spooner	8 December 1958	2 June 1964	V-P Exec. Council; National Development	Government	Menzies	5 years, 178 days	Shane Paltridge
Shane Paltridge	10 June 1964	19 January 1966	Defence	Government	Menzies	1 year, 230 days	Denham Henty
Denham Henty	26 January 1966	16 October 1967	Supply	Government	Holt	1 year, 263 days	John Gorton
John Gorton	16 October 1967	1 February 1968	Education and Science; Prime Minister (from 10 Jan. 1968)	Government	Holt	108 days	Denham Henty
John Gorton	16 October 1967	1 February 1968	Education and Science; Prime Minister (from 10 Jan. 1968)	Government	None	108 days	Denham Henty
John Gorton	16 October 1967	1 February 1968	Education and Science; Prime Minister (from 10 Jan. 1968)	Government	Himself	108 days	Denham Henty
Ken Anderson	28 February 1968 (Note: Anderson was appointed Leader of the Government before the second session of the 26th Parliament, and Gorton made his appointments on 28 February 1968.)	5 December 1972	Supply (to 1971); Health	Government	Gorton	4 years, 281 days	Denham Henty
Ken Anderson	28 February 1968	5 December 1972	Supply (to 1971); Health	Government	Gorton	4 years, 281 days	Annabelle Rankin
Ken Anderson	28 February 1968	5 December 1972	Supply (to 1971); Health	Government	McMahon	4 years, 281 days	Annabelle Rankin
Ken Anderson	28 February 1968	5 December 1972	Supply (to 1971); Health	Government	McMahon	4 years, 281 days	Reg Wright
Reg Withers	20 December 1972	11 November 1975		Opposition	Snedden	5 years, 230 days	
Reg Withers	20 December 1972	11 November 1975		Opposition	Fraser	5 years, 230 days	
Reg Withers	12 November 1975	7 August 1978	V-P Exec. Council (Note: Withers was appointed Vice-President of the Executive Council the day after the Dismissal as part of Fraser's Caretaker Cabinet, but he continued in that office for his entire tenure as Leader of the Government. On the same date, he was appointed caretaker Minister for the Capital Territory, Special Minister of State, Minister for the Media, and Minister for Tourism and Recreation. He served in those offices until 22 December, when Fraser's first full Cabinet was sworn in. The Senate did not meet during the period 12 November to 22 December 1975 (indeed it was dissolved for most of that time). Withers gained the Administrative Services portfolio as part of the 22 December reshuffle.); Administrative Services	Government	Fraser	5 years, 230 days	
John Carrick	7 August 1978	11 March 1983	V-P Exec. Council (to 1982); Education (to 1979); National Development (from 1979)	Government	Fraser	4 years, 216 days	
Fred Chaney	11 March 1983	27 February 1990	Energy and Resources (1983-1984); Industry, Technology and Commerce (1984-1985)	Opposition	Peacock	6 years, 353 days	
Fred Chaney	11 March 1983	27 February 1990	Industry, Technology and Commerce (1985-1987); Employment (1987); Industrial Relations (1987-1988); Industry, Technology and Commerce (1988-1989)	Opposition	Howard	6 years, 353 days	
Fred Chaney	11 March 1983	27 February 1990	Industrial Relations (1989-1990); Deputy Leader of the Opposition (1989-1990)	Opposition	Peacock	6 years, 353 days	
Robert Hill	3 April 1990	11 March 1996	Foreign Affairs (1990-1993); Defence, Public Administration (1993-1994)	Opposition	Hewson	15 years, 292 days	
Robert Hill	3 April 1990	11 March 1996	Education, Science and Technology	Opposition	Downer	15 years, 292 days	
Robert Hill	3 April 1990	11 March 1996	Education, Science and Technology	Opposition	Howard	15 years, 292 days	
Robert Hill	11 March 1996	20 January 2006	Environment and Heritage (to 2001) (Note: Minister for Environment 1996–98.); Defence	Government	Howard	15 years, 292 days	Nick Minchin
Nick Minchin	27 January 2006	3 December 2007	V-P Exec. Council; Finance and Administration	Government	Howard	4 years, 96 days	Helen Coonan
Nick Minchin	3 December 2007	3 May 2010				4 years, 96 days	
Nick Minchin	3 December 2007	3 May 2010	Defence	Opposition	Nelson	4 years, 96 days	Eric Abetz
Nick Minchin	3 December 2007	3 May 2010	Broadband, Communications and the Digital Economy	Opposition	Turnbull	4 years, 96 days	Eric Abetz
Nick Minchin	3 December 2007	3 May 2010	Resources and Energy	Opposition	Abbott	4 years, 96 days	Eric Abetz
Eric Abetz	3 May 2010	18 September 2013	Employment and Workplace Relations	Opposition	Abbott	2 years, 2 days	George Brandis
Eric Abetz	18 September 2013	21 September 2015	Employment	Government	Abbott	2 years, 2 days	George Brandis
George Brandis	21 September 2015	20 December 2017	Attorney-General; V-P Exec. Council	Government	Turnbull	2 years, 90 days	Mathias Cormann
Mathias Cormann	20 December 2017	30 October 2020	Finance and the Public Service; V-P Exec. Council	Government	Turnbull	2 years, 315 days	Mitch Fifield; Simon Birmingham
Mathias Cormann	20 December 2017	30 October 2020	Finance and the Public Service; V-P Exec. Council	Government	Morrison	2 years, 315 days	Mitch Fifield; Simon Birmingham
Simon Birmingham	30 October 2020	25 January 2025	Finance; Trade, Tourism and Investment (to Dec 2020); V-P Exec. Council	Government	Morrison	4 years, 87 days	Michaelia Cash
Simon Birmingham	30 October 2020	25 January 2025	Foreign Affairs	Opposition	Dutton	4 years, 87 days	Michaelia Cash
Michaelia Cash	25 January 2025	Incumbent	Employment and Workplace Relations (to Apr 2023); Attorney General (Apr 2023–May 2025)	Opposition	Dutton	1 year, 295 days	Anne Ruston
Michaelia Cash	25 January 2025	Incumbent	Foreign Affairs	Opposition	Ley	1 year, 295 days	Anne Ruston
Michaelia Cash	25 January 2025	Incumbent	Attorney General	Opposition	Taylor	1 year, 295 days	Anne Ruston

== See also ==
- Leader of the Australian Labor Party
