= Kellard =

Kellard is a surname. Notable people with the surname include:

- Adrian Lee Kellard (1959–1991), American artist
- Bobby Kellard (1943–2021), English footballer
- Ralph Kellard (1884–1955), American actor
- Robert Kellard (1915–1981), American actor

== See also ==
- Kelland
- Kellar
