= Austin Lewis (politician) =

Australian politician

Senator for Victoria
- In office 17 December 1976 – 30 June 1993
- Preceded by: Ivor Greenwood

Personal details
- Born: 5 December 1932 Richmond, Victoria, Australia
- Died: 30 May 2024 (aged 91) Port Fairy, Victoria, Australia
- Party: Liberal
- Spouse: Wilma Lawrey (m. 1956)
- Education: University of Melbourne
- Occupation: Solicitor; Company director

Austin William Russell Lewis (5 December 1932 – 30 May 2024) was an Australian politician. He was a member of the Liberal Party and served as a Senator for Victoria from 1976 to 1993. He was a shadow minister from 1984 to 1990 and was the Liberal Party's deputy Senate leader from 1987 to 1990.

== Early life ==
Lewis was born on 5 December 1932 in Richmond, Victoria. He was the only child born to Dulcie Alexandrina (née Williams) and David Lewis. His father, a fruiterer by profession, was president of the local branch of the Australian Labor Party (ALP) and twice served as mayor of the City of Richmond.

Lewis was educated at Melbourne High School and went on to the University of Melbourne, graduating Bachelor of Laws in 1955. He was also a member of the Citizen Air Force from 1951 to 1956. After graduating from university he moved to Warrnambool and joined the law firm of J. S. Tait & Co., eventually becoming senior partner. He was also involved in local businesses, including as chairman of Warrnambool Woollen Mills Co. Ltd and a director of Mid-City Motel (Ballarat) Pty Ltd, as well as chair of the management committee of Warrnambool Base Hospital.

== Politics ==
=== Early involvement ===
Lewis initially supported the ALP like his father, but was disillusioned by the party split of 1955. He joined the Liberal Party in the 1960s at the suggestion of his state MP Ronald Mack. He served as chairman of the party's Warrnambool branch from 1969 to 1976. He served on the party's state executive from 1973 to 1976 and was also a campaign director for the state seat of Warrnambool and the federal seat of Wannon, held by future prime minister Malcolm Fraser.

=== Electoral record ===
On 7 December 1976, Lewis was elected to fill a casual vacancy caused by the death of Victorian senator Ivor Greenwood. He had defeated 17 other candidates for Liberal preselection. He was re-elected to a six-year term in his own right at the 1980 federal election, which was cut short by a double dissolution. He was subsequently re-elected at the 1983 and 1987 elections, heading the Liberal ticket in Victoria at the latter. He did not re-contest his seat in 1993 and retired at the conclusion of his term on 30 June 1993.

=== Senate work ===
Lewis served on 21 Senate committees during his time in office, including as chairman of the Standing Committee on Regulations and Ordinances from 1980 to 1983. He played a key role in the introduction of financial impact statements to the Senate, in 1980 introducing a motion that all bills introduced into the Senate be accompanied by a statement "containing, as applicable, the estimated costs, revenue or savings for government and the estimated costs or savings to the wider community". His proposal was adopted by the Hawke government in 1983.

In 1982, Lewis became the first senator to use the Senate's powers of disallowance to attempt to disallow a rule of the High Court. The rule retrospectively imposed a higher interest on judgment debts backdated to April 1980. The issue was resolved following correspondence between Lewis and Chief Justice Harry Gibbs, which saw the rule amended to remove the retrospective elements.

=== Political positions ===
Lewis had a reputation for social conservatism. His speeches on what became the Sex Discrimination Act 1984 attracted attention when he suggested that the legislation would lead to greater levels of adultery from women admitted to previously male-only industries. In December 1983 he denounced in vitro fertilisation in parliament, stating those involved in the procedure were "in effect playing the role of God" and comparing them to "the Nazis endeavouring to manipulate the human race in Germany".

=== Shadow ministry and leadership role ===
Following the 1984 election, Lewis was included in Andrew Peacock's shadow ministry with responsibility for the territories portfolio. He supported John Howard's successful leadership challenge in 1985 and after the 1987 election was elected as deputy leader of the opposition in the senate under Fred Chaney. He was subsequently promoted to shadow cabinet and given expanded responsibilities.

Despite regarding himself as a "very loyal supporter" of Howard, Lewis ultimately supported Peacock's successful challenge to Howard in 1989. He defected to Peacock after being convinced by Chaney that a change in leadership was inevitable, in what he described as "probably the worst day I have ever had in politics".

In November 1989, it was announced that Lewis would become acting leader of the Liberal Party in the Senate, with Chaney resigning to contest a House of Representatives seat at the 1990 election. However, he was sacked from shadow cabinet in February 1990 following a 7.30 interview in which he stated that Peacock would be removed as leader if the party lost the election, as well as dismissing suggestions that Howard could return to the leadership. Peacock attributed the dismissal to Lewis breaching "the standards of teamwork and collective association of responsibility".

== Personal life ==
Lewis married Wilma Lawrey in 1956, with whom he had four children. He died in Port Fairy, Victoria, on 30 May 2024, aged 91.
