= Mackellar =

Mackellar is a surname. Notable people with the surname include:

- Craig Mackellar (born 1979), Scottish cricketer
- Dorothea Mackellar, influential bush poet
- Duncan Mackellar and his identically named nephew, Duncan Mackellar, Junior, both early colonial settlers of the area near Braidwood.
- Michael MacKellar, former Member for Warringah
- Patrick MacKellar, British military engineer, 1717–1778

In addition, Mackellar may refer to:

- Mackellar Girls Campus, a girls' high school in Manly Vale, a suburb of Sydney
- The Division of Mackellar, an Australian Federal electorate first held by William Wentworth IV

== See also ==
- McKellar (disambiguation)
