= McKellar =

McKellar is a surname. Notable people with the surname include:

- Archibald McKellar (1816–1894), Canadian politician
- Andrew McKellar (1910–1969), Canadian astronomer
- Archie McKellar (1912–1940), Royal Air Force fighter pilot during the Battle of Britain
- Colin McKellar (1903–1970), Australian farmer, soldier and federal politician
- Danica McKellar (born 1975), American actress, sister of Crystal
- Daniel McKellar (1892–1917), Scottish footballer
- Don McKellar (born 1963), Canadian actor, writer, and filmmaker
- Honor McKellar (1920–2024), New Zealand mezzo-soprano opera singer and singing teacher
- John McKellar (1833–1900), Canadian businessman and politician
- John McKellar (writer) (1930–2010), Australian playwright, social satirist
- Kenneth McKellar (politician) (1869–1957), American politician
- Kenneth McKellar (singer) (1927–2010), Scottish singer
- Earl McKellar (1918–1976), Canadian politician
- Phil McKellar, Australian record producer

== See also ==
- Kellar
- Mackellar (disambiguation)
- John Thompson McKellar Anderson
