= 1982 Liberal Party of Australia leadership spill =

Liberal Party of Australia leadership spill, 1982
- 8 April 1982
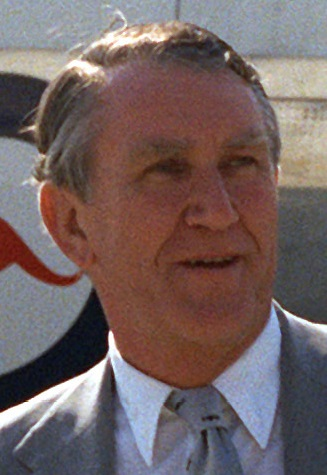

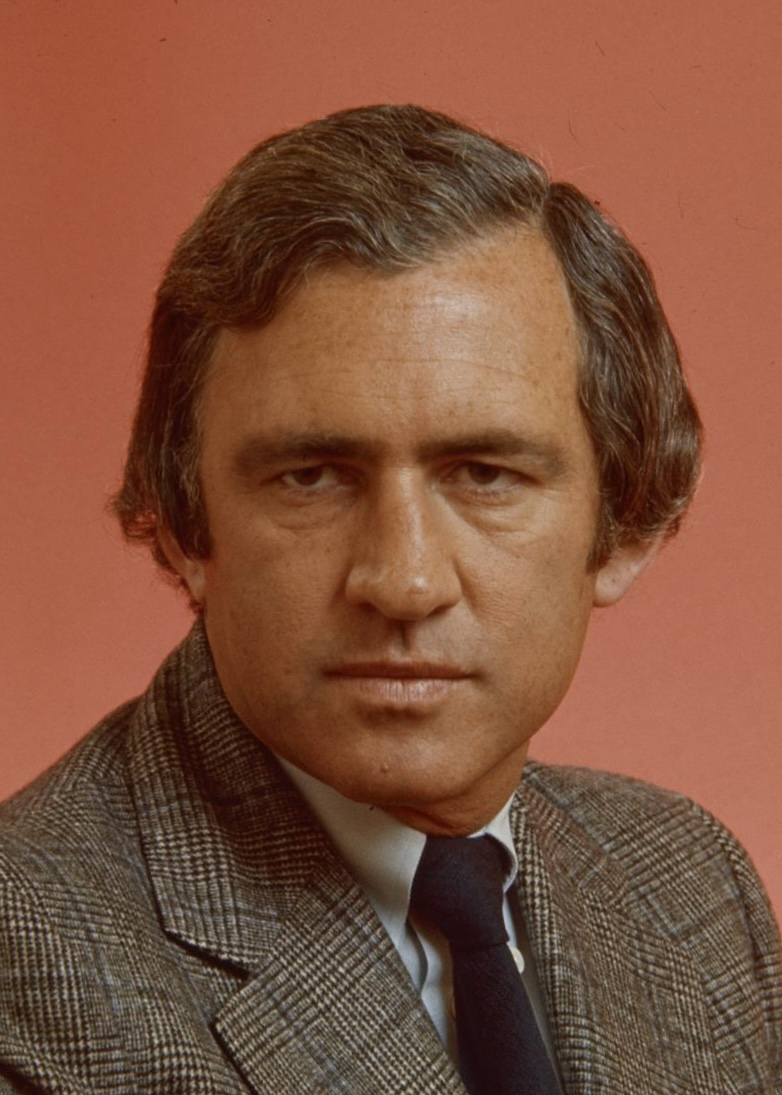
Candidate	Malcolm Fraser	Andrew Peacock
Caucus vote	54	27
Percentage	66.7%	33.3%
Seat	Wannon (Vic.)	Kooyong (Vic.)
Leader before election
Malcolm Fraser
Elected Leader
Malcolm Fraser

A spill of the leadership of the Liberal Party of Australia took place on 8 April 1982, following former foreign minister Andrew Peacock's dissatisfaction with the party's direction under Prime Minister Malcolm Fraser. Fraser beat Peacock's challenge for the leadership of the Liberal Party, 54 votes to 27.

== Background ==
On 16 April 1981 Andrew Peacock suddenly resigned from the Cabinet, accusing Prime Minister Fraser of constant interference in his portfolio. This prompted much speculation that Peacock intended to challenge Fraser for the leadership.

Almost exactly a year later, after a disappointing by election defeat and days after the party's defeat in the Victorian state election (losing power after 27 years), on 5 April 1982 Peacock declared his intention to challenge Fraser, saying "The results of recent elections have shown that the Liberal Party has lost the broad community support which it requires to govern effectively.".

The day before the spill Deputy Leader Phillip Lynch announced his resignation stating that "I believe that this is the time to seek the talents of a younger man for the position." This prompted talk of a ticket of Peacock for leader and Treasurer John Howard for deputy

== Candidates ==
- Malcolm Fraser, incumbent leader, Prime Minister of Australia, Member for Wannon
- Andrew Peacock, former minister for industrial relations, Member for Kooyong

== Results ==
Liberal Party of Australia deputy leadership ballot, 1982

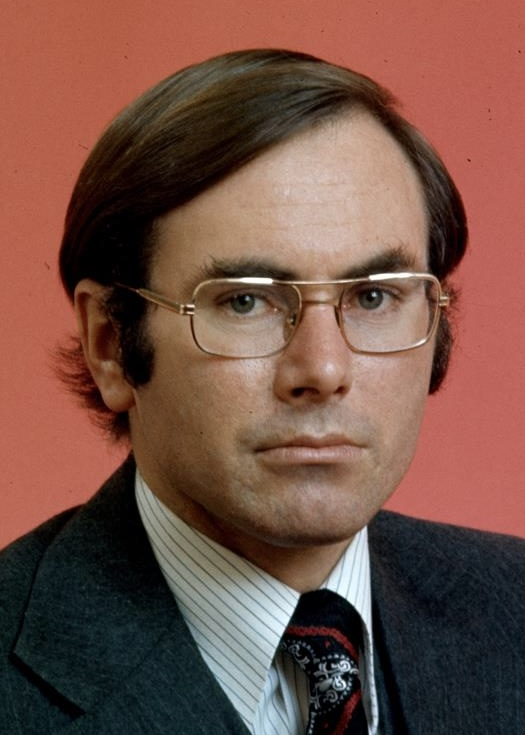

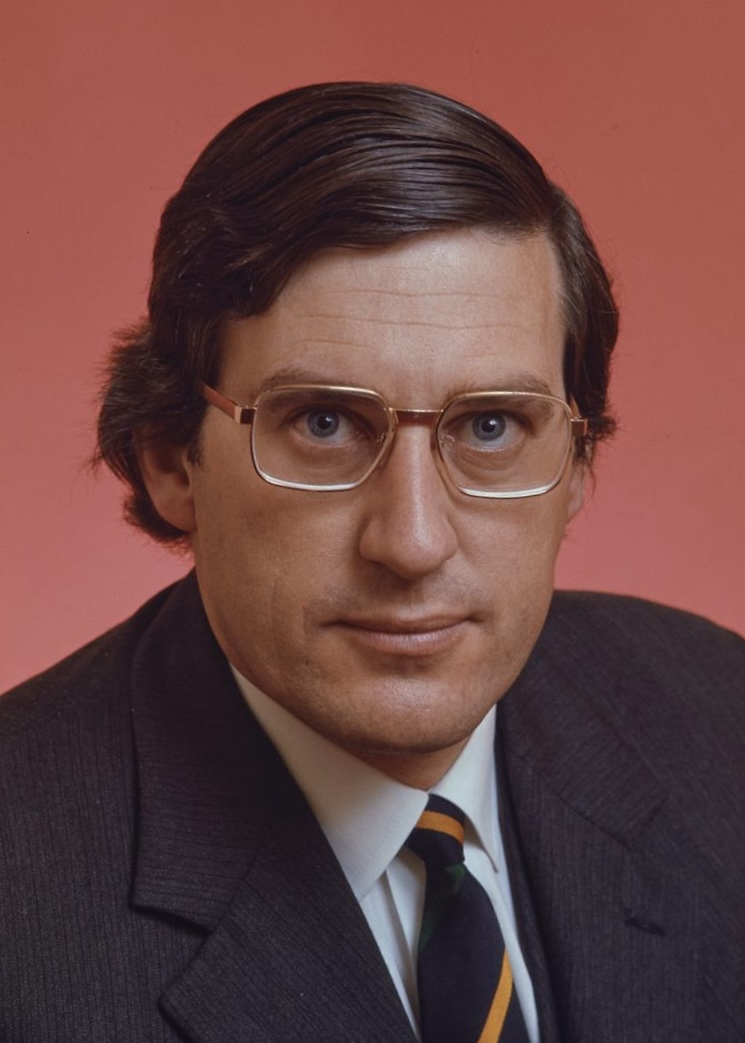

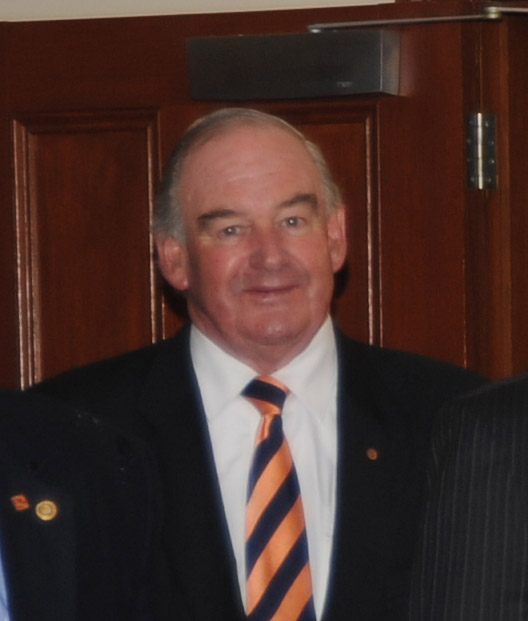

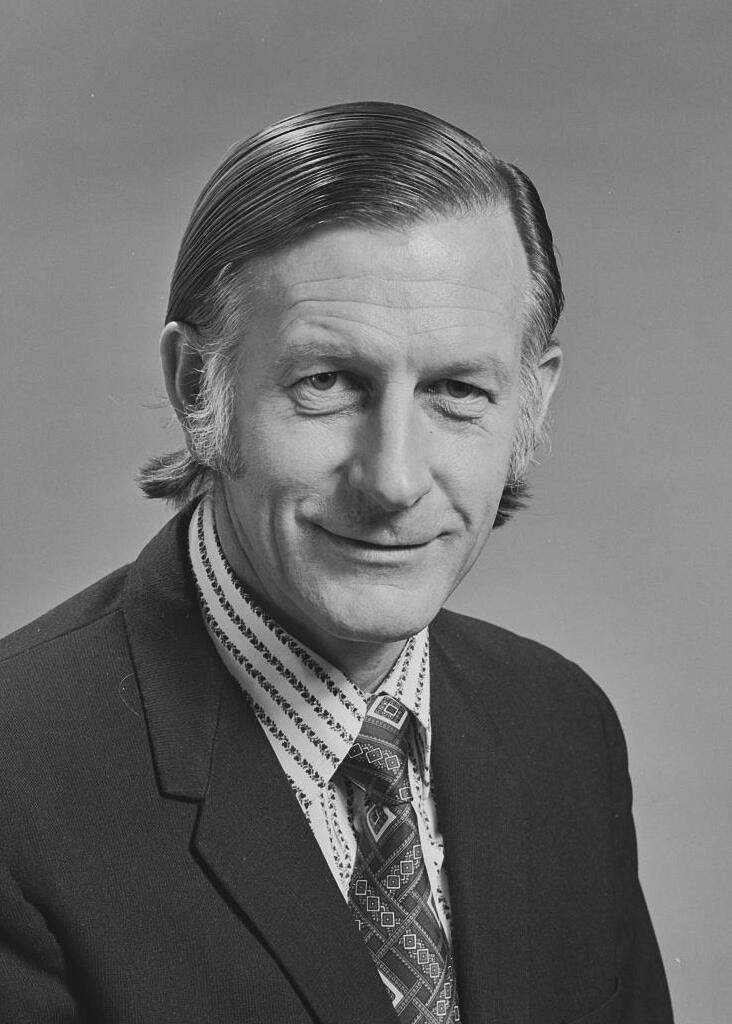
Candidate	John Howard	Michael MacKellar	Michael Hodgman
First ballot	34 (42.0%)	18 (22.2%)	22 (27.2%)
Second ballot	56 (55.6%)	27 (33.3%)	9 (11.1%)
Candidate	Ian Viner
First ballot	5 (6.2%)
Second ballot	Eliminated
Deputy Leader before election
Phillip Lynch
Elected Deputy Leader
John Howard

The following tables gives the ballot results:

=== Leadership ballot ===
Name	Votes	Percentage
Malcolm Fraser	54	66.7
Andrew Peacock	27	33.3

=== Deputy leadership ballot ===
Candidate	First round	Second round
John Howard	34	45
Michael MacKellar	18	27
Michael Hodgman	22	9
Ian Viner	5	Eliminated
Informal	1	0
Abstention	1	0

== Aftermath ==
Following his victory Fraser returned Peacock to the Cabinet, replacing the retiring Lynch. It was however not enough to maintain his prime ministership for long, 11 months later he lost a snap federal election to Bob Hawke's Labor Party and resigned, leaving Peacock to take the leadership.
