= Kelland =

Kelland is a surname. Notable people with the surname include:

- Clarence Budington Kelland (1881–1964), American author
- Gilbert Kelland (1924–1997), British police officer and Freemason
- John Kelland (politician)
- Peter Kelland (1926–2011), English cricketer
- Philip Kelland (1808–1879), English mathematician
- Eve Louise Kelland (1889–1943), Australian actress and singer
