= 1985 Liberal Party of Australia leadership spill =

Liberal Party of Australia Leadership spill, 1985
- 5 September 1985
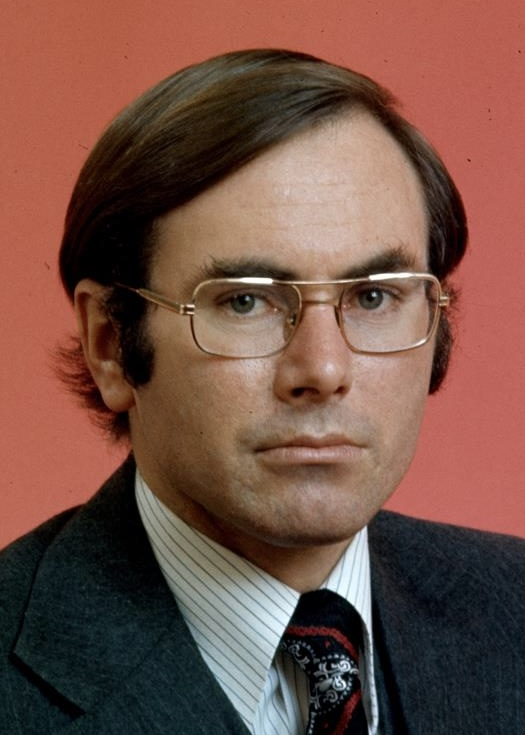
		LIB
Candidate	John Howard	Jim Carlton
Caucus vote	57	6
Percentage	81.4%	8.6%
Seat	Bennelong (NSW)	Mackellar (NSW)
Leader before election
Andrew Peacock
Elected Leader
John Howard

A leadership spill of the Liberal Party of Australia took place on 5 September 1985 with John Howard replacing Andrew Peacock.

A spill of the deputy leadership of the party took place on that day, Peacock attempting to replace John Howard with his preferred candidate John Moore. The spill was won by Howard over Moore by 38 votes to 31 with 7 members abstaining.

Upon rejection of his candidate for the deputy leadership, Andrew Peacock resigned and was replaced by John Howard as leader defeating Jim Carlton 57 votes to 6. The Deputy leadership was then filled by Neil Brown defeating 11 others (including Moore) for the position.

== Background ==
There had been feelings within the Liberal Party that the parties parliamentary wing had been ignoring the organisational wing. The leader of the organisational wing, John Valder, asserted that this could have contributed to the recent electoral losses. These feelings were linked to the spill, although Valder kept his distance from assertions that he was directly involved in instigating the spill.

== Initial deputy candidates ==
- John Howard, incumbent Deputy Leader, Shadow Treasurer, Member for Bennelong
- John Moore, Shadow Minister for Communications, Member for Ryan

== Withdrawn candidates ==
- Michael Hodgman, Shadow Minister for Housing and Construction, Member for Denison

== Initial results ==
Liberal Party of Australia deputy leadership ballot, 1985

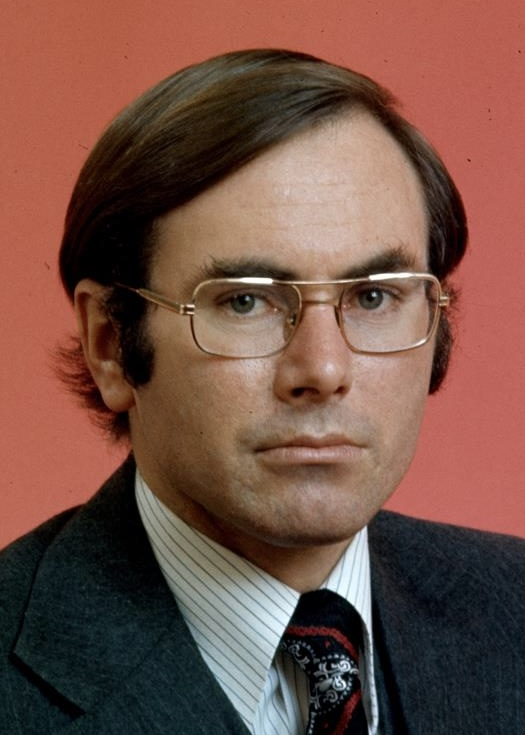

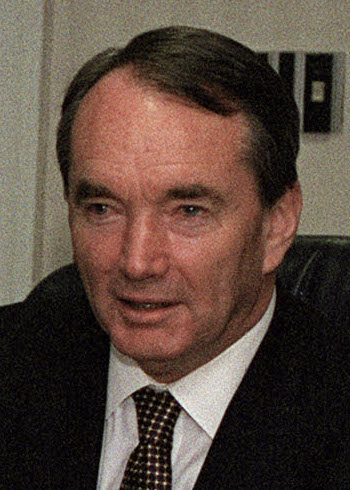
Candidate	John Howard	John Moore
Caucus vote	38 (50.0%)	31 (40.8%)
Deputy Leader before election
John Howard
Elected Deputy Leader
John Howard

=== Spill motion to vacate deputy leadership ===
Spill motion to vacate deputy leadership
Support	Votes
Yes	35
No	34

=== Deputy leadership ballot ===
Name	Final ballot	Percentage
John Howard	38	50.0
John Moore	31	40.8
Informal	7	9.2

== Final candidates ==
- Jim Carlton, former Shadow Minister for Health, Member for Mackellar
- John Howard, incumbent Deputy Leader, Member for Bennelong

== Results ==
Liberal Party of Australia deputy leadership ballot, 1985

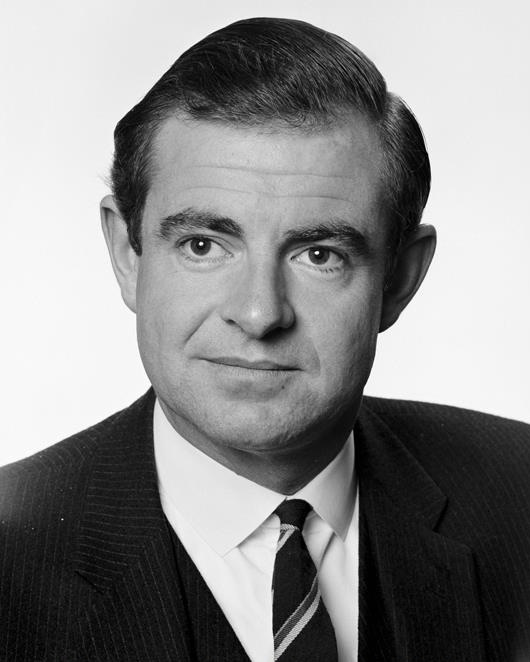

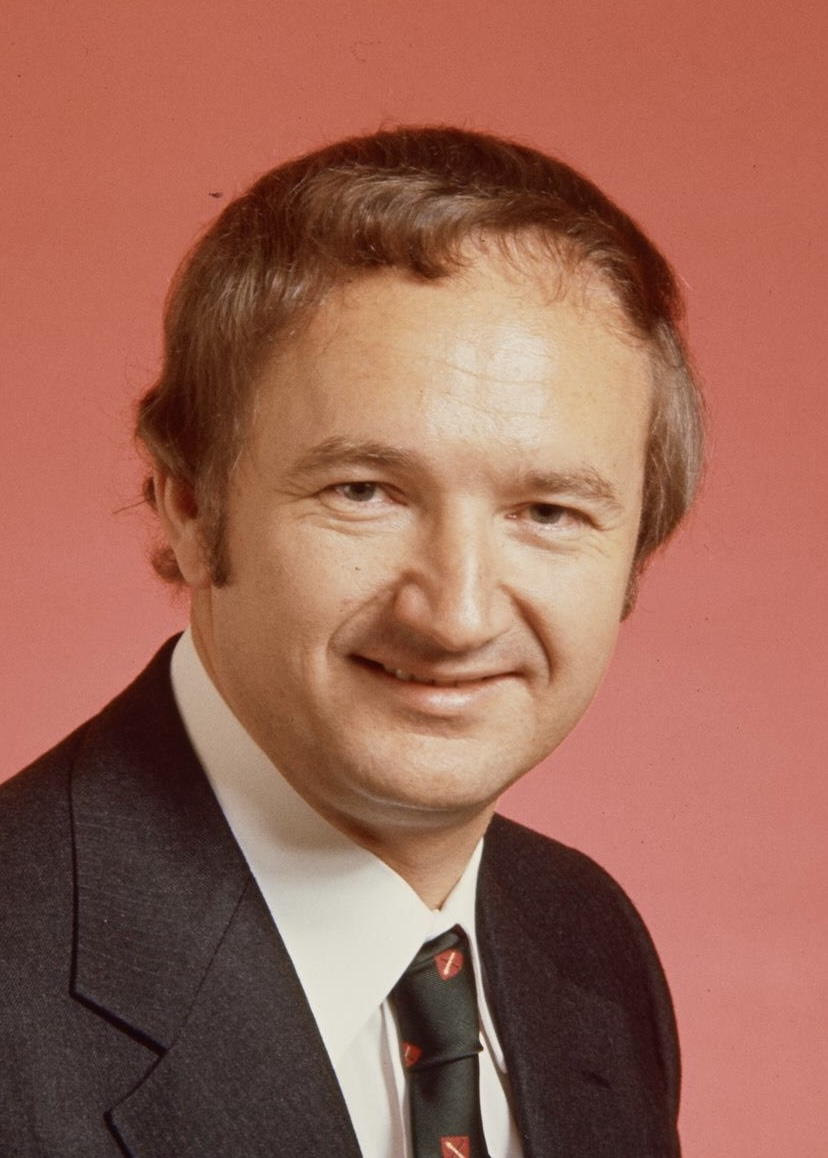

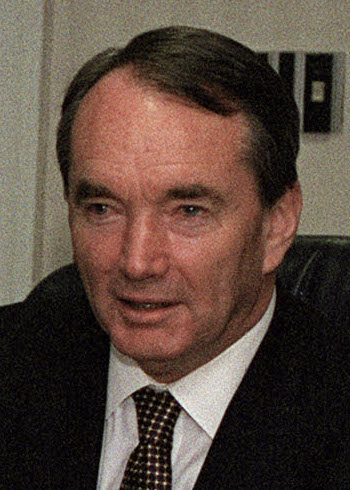
Candidate	Neil Brown	Ian Macphee
Caucus vote	36	15
Percentage	51.4%	21.4%
Seat	Menzies (Vic.)	Goldstein (Vic.)
Candidate	John Moore	Peter Shack
Caucus vote	11	8
Percentage	15.7%	11.4%
Seat	Ryan (Qld.)	Tangney (WA)
Deputy Leader before election
John Howard
Elected Deputy Leader
Neil Brown

The following tables gives the ballot results:

=== Leadership ballot ===
Name	Votes	Percentage
John Howard	57	81.4
Jim Carlton	6	8.6
Informal	7	10.0

=== Deputy leadership ballot ===
Candidate	Final ballot	%
Neil Brown	36	51.4
Ian Macphee	15	21.4
John Moore	11	15.7
Peter Shack	8	11.4

Other candidates in order of elimination:

- Julian Beale and Roger Shipton
- David Connolly
- Steele Hall
- Michael MacKellar
- Wilson Tuckey
- Michael Hodgman
- Jim Carlton

== Aftermath ==
Howard would remain party leader until 1989, surviving a spill in 1987 triggered by the 1987 election loss. Peacock would stand both times.
