= Michael MacKellar =

Australian politician (1938–2015)

The Honourable Michael MacKellar AM
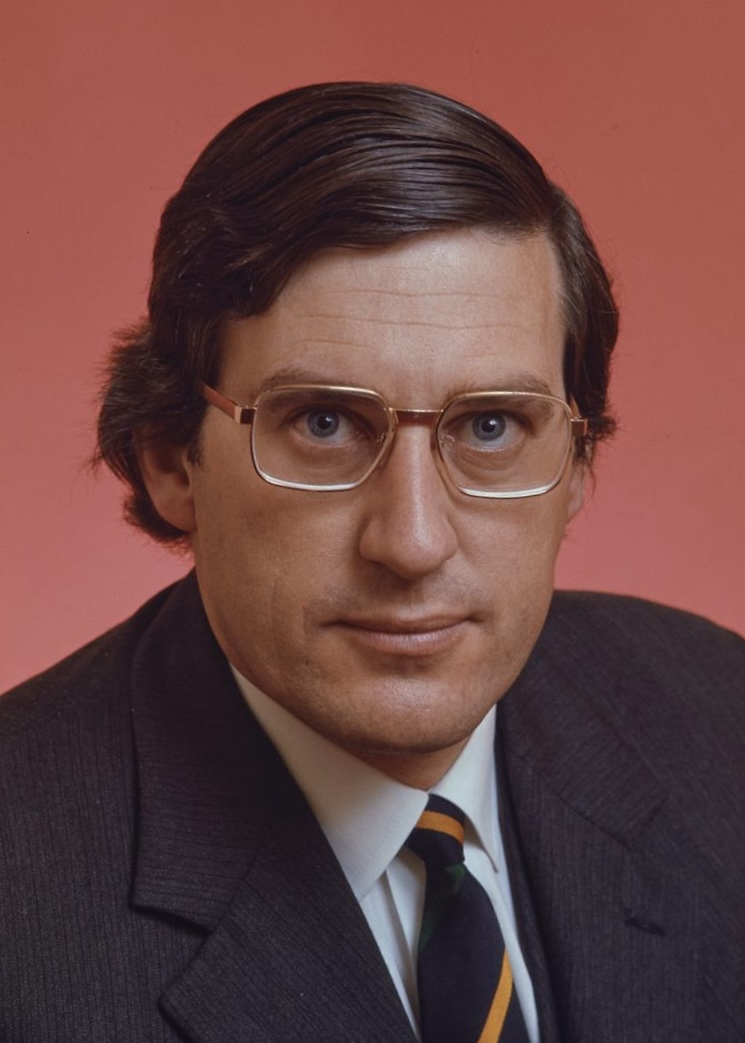
- MacKellar in 1974

Minister for Home Affairs and the Environment
- In office 17 February 1981 – 19 March 1981
- Prime Minister: Malcolm Fraser
- Preceded by: Robert Ellicott
- Succeeded by: Ian Wilson

Minister for Health
- In office 8 December 1979 – 20 April 1982
- Prime Minister: Malcolm Fraser
- Preceded by: Ralph Hunt
- Succeeded by: Peter Baume

Minister for Immigration and Ethnic Affairs
- In office 22 December 1975 – 8 December 1979
- Prime Minister: Malcolm Fraser
- Preceded by: Tony Street
- Succeeded by: Ian Macphee

Member of the Australian Parliament for Warringah
- In office 25 October 1969 – 18 February 1994
- Preceded by: Edward St John
- Succeeded by: Tony Abbott

Personal details
- Born: Michael John Randal MacKellar; 27 October 1938 Moree, New South Wales, Australia
- Died: 9 May 2015 (aged 76) Melbourne, Victoria, Australia
- Party: Liberal
- Children: 3
- Education: University of Sydney, University of Oxford
- Occupation: Agricultural scientist

Michael John Randal MacKellar AM (27 October 1938 – 9 May 2015) was an Australian politician. He was a member of the Liberal Party and served in the House of Representatives from 1969 to 1994, representing the Division of Warringah. He was Minister for Immigration and Ethnic Affairs (1975–1979) and Minister for Health (1979–1982) in the Fraser government.

== Biography ==
MacKellar was born in Moree, New South Wales and educated at the Sydney Church of England Grammar School, before attending the University of Sydney and University of Oxford. He was an agricultural scientist, working at the New South Wales Department of Agriculture and lecturing at the University of Sydney and New South Wales before he entered politics. He was first elected to Parliament in 1969, taking over from the controversial Edward St. John. In June 1974 he joined the Shadow Cabinet as Shadow Immigration Minister.

=== Fraser government (1975–1983) ===
In December 1975, MacKellar was first appointed to the front bench as the Minister for Immigration and Ethnic Affairs, a position he held until 1979, when he became Minister for Health and Minister Assisting the Prime Minister. In Opposition, MacKellar acted as Shadow Minister for Science.

MacKellar attracted some controversy over his handling of an incident involving the improper importation of a colour television set. In 1982, a ministerial staffer submitted an incorrect customs declaration form when arranging for the set to be imported. When this was discovered, a fellow Minister, John Moore, attempted a cover-up. Moore and MacKellar both accepted responsibility and resigned as ministers.

=== In Opposition (1983–1994) ===
Following the 1983 election defeat he returned to the frontbench as Shadow Foreign Affairs Minister, before being demoted to Shadow Science Minister after the 1984 election. After Andrew Peacock resigned he moved to the backbench.

He contested the Liberal Deputy leadership three times 1982, 1985 & 1987, finishing second to John Howard in 1982.

MacKellar resigned from Parliament on 18 February 1994, causing a by-election that was subsequently won by future Prime Minister Tony Abbott.

=== After politics ===
After leaving politics MacKellar became Chairman of the Australia New Zealand Food Authority in 1998. He also acted as Chief Operations Officer of the Baker Medical Research Institute and Chief Executive Officer of the Plastics and Chemicals Industries Association. MacKellar also served as the president of the Melbourne-based National Ageing Research Institute.

== Personal life ==
Mackellar had three children, one of whom was autistic. His daughter Maggie was the subject of an episode of ABC TV's Australian Story. He died on 9 May 2015 at the age of 76. He was given a state funeral on 15 May 2015 at St John's Anglican Church, Toorak, Victoria.

Political offices
Preceded by Tony Street	Minister for Immigration and Ethnic Affairs; 1975–1979	Succeeded by Ian Macphee
Preceded by Ralph Hunt	Minister for Health; 1979–1982	Succeeded by Peter Baume
Preceded by Robert Ellicott	Minister for Home Affairs and the Environment; 1981	Succeeded by Ian Wilson
Parliament of Australia
Preceded by Edward St. John	Member for Warringah; 1969–1994	Succeeded by Tony Abbott
