= McKellar (disambiguation) =

McKellar is a surname.

McKellar may also refer to:

- McKellar, Australian Capital Territory, a suburb of Canberra
- McKellar, Ontario, a township in Canada
- The southern branch of the Kaministiquia River delta, known as the "McKellar River"
- McKellar (crater), a lunar impact crater on the far side of the Moon
- McKellar Glacier, a Glacier in Victoria Land in Antarctica
