= Kellar =

Kellar is a German surname. Notable people with the surname include:

- Becky Kellar-Duke (born 1975), Canadian ice hockey player
- George C. Kellar (1879–1954), American politician
- Harry Kellar (1849–1922), American magician (born "Heinrich Keller")
- Mark Kellar (1952–2023), American football player
- Scott Kellar (born 1963), American football player

== See also ==
- McKellar
