= 1984 Australian federal election =

- 1 December 1984

All 148 seats in the House of Representatives 75 seats were needed for a majority in the House 46 (of the 76) seats in the Senate
- Registered: 9,869,217 ▲5.30%
- Turnout: 9,295,421 (94.19%) (▼0.45 pp)
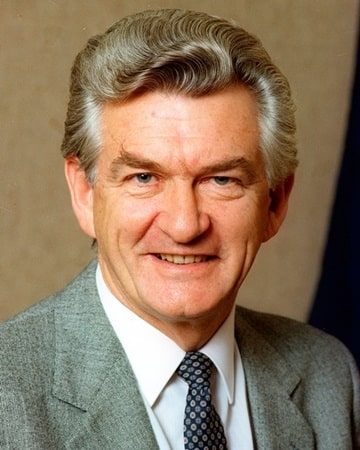

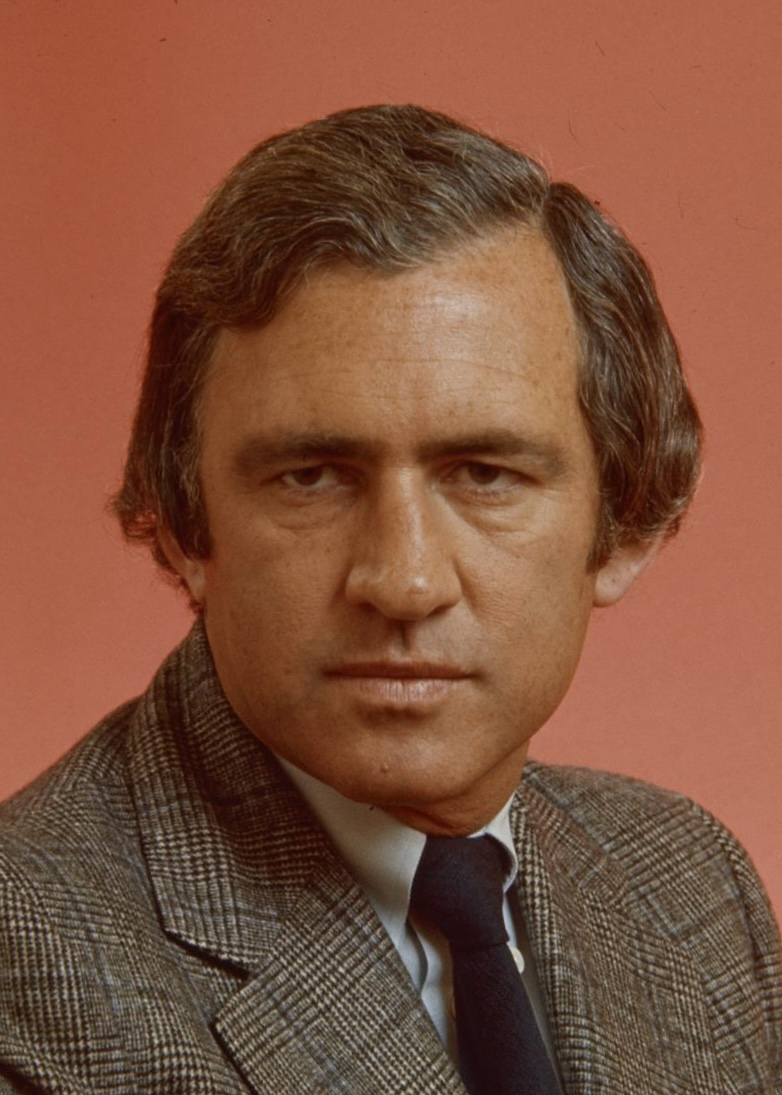
	First party	Second party
Leader	Bob Hawke	Andrew Peacock
Party	Labor	Coalition
Leader since	8 February 1983	11 March 1983
Leader's seat	Wills (Vic.)	Kooyong (Vic.)
Last election	75 seats	50 seats
Seats won	82 seats	66 seats
Seat change	▲7	▲16
Primary vote	4,120,130	3,900,042
Percentage	47.55%	45.01%
Swing	▼1.93%	▲1.40%
TPP	51.77%	48.23%
TPP swing	▼1.46%	▲1.46%
- Results by division for the House of Representatives, shaded by winning party's margin of victory.
Prime Minister before election
Bob Hawke
Labor
Subsequent Prime Minister
Bob Hawke
Labor

A federal election was held in Australia on 1 December 1984. All 148 seats in the House of Representatives (24 of them newly created) and 46 of 76 seats in the Senate (12 of them newly created) were up for election. The incumbent Labor Party led by Prime Minister Bob Hawke defeated the opposition Liberal–National coalition, led by Andrew Peacock.

The election was held in conjunction with two referendum questions, neither of which was carried.

== Background and issues ==
The election had a long campaign and a high rate of informal voting for the House of Representatives, but decreased rate in the Senate (due to the introduction of the Group voting ticket). Although a House election was not due until 1986, Hawke opted to call an election 18 months early in part to bring the elections for the House and Senate back into line following the double dissolution election of 1983.

The legislated increase in the size of the House by 24 seats and the Senate by 12 seats came into effect at the 1984 election. Prior to 1984 the electoral commission did not undertake a full distribution of preferences for statistical purposes. The stored ballot papers for the previous election were put through this process prior to their destruction – therefore the figures from 1983 onwards show the actual result based on full distribution of preferences.

== Results ==
=== House of Representatives ===
Government (82) Labor (82) Opposition (66) Coalition Liberal (44) National (21) CLP (1)

House of Reps (IRV) — 1984–87 – Turnout 94.19% (CV) — Informal 6.78%
Party	Votes	%	Swing	Seats	Change
Labor	4,120,130	47.55	−1.93	82	▲7
Liberal	2,951,556	34.06	−0.06	44	▲11
National	921,151	10.63	+1.42	21	▲4
Country Liberal	27,335	0.32	+0.08	1	▲1
Liberal–National Coalition	3,900,042	45.01	+1.40	66	▲16
Democrats	472,204	5.45	+0.42		
Others	172,576	1.99			
Total	8,664,952			148	▲23
Two-party-preferred
Labor	4,484,622	51.77	−1.46	82	▲7
Liberal–National Coalition	4,178,572	48.23	+1.46	66	▲16
Invalid/blank votes	630,469	6.8	+4.7		
Turnout	9,295,421	94.2			
Registered voters	9,869,217				
Source: Federal Election Results 1949-1993

First preference vote
Labor	47.55%
Liberal	34.06%
National	10.63%
Democrats	5.45%
CLP	0.32%
Other	1.99%

Two-party-preferred vote
Labor	51.77%
Coalition	48.23%

Parliament seats
Labor	55.41%
Coalition	44.59%

=== Senate ===
Government (34) Labor (34) Opposition (33) Coalition Liberal (27) National (5) CLP (1) Crossbench (9) Democrats (7) NDP (1) Independent (1)

Senate (STV GV) — 1984–87 – Turnout 94.55% (CV) — Informal 4.68%
Party	Votes	%	Swing	Seats won	Total seats	Change
Australian Labor Party	3,750,789	42.17	−3.32	20	34	▲4
Liberal/National joint ticket	1,130,601	12.71	−11.49	3	*	*
Liberal Party of Australia	1,831,006	20.59	+8.58	14	27	▲4
National Party of Australia	527,278	5.93	+0.87	2	5	▲1
Country Liberal Party	27,972	0.31	+0.04	1	1	Steady
Liberal/National Coalition	3,516,857	39.54	–0.41	20	33	▲5
Australian Democrats	677,970	7.62	−2.32	5	7	▲2
Nuclear Disarmament Party	643,061	7.23	*	1	1	▲1
Harradine Group	22,992	0.26	−0.32		1	Steady
Others	282,431	3.18	+0.73			
Total	8,894,100			46	76	▲12
Invalid/blank votes	437,065	4.7	–5.2			
Turnout	9,331,165	94.5				
Registered voters	9,869,217					
Source: Federal Election Results 1949-1993

== Seats changing hands ==
Seat	Pre-1984			Swing	Post-1984		
Seat	Party	Member	Margin	Swing	Margin	Member	Party
Farrer, NSW	Liberal	Wal Fife	7.4	N/A	12.95	Tim Fischer	National
Flinders, Vic	Labor	Bob Chynoweth	0.3	1.47	1.17	Peter Reith	Liberal
Forde, Qld	Labor	notional – new seat	2.7	2.74	0.04	David Watson	Liberal
Gilmore, NSW	Labor	notional – new seat	0.5	1.72	1.22	John Sharp	National
Hinkler, Qld	Labor	notional – new seat	0.6	0.79	0.19	Bryan Conquest	National
Hume, NSW	National	Stephen Lusher	4.3	N/A	7.65	Wal Fife	Liberal
Macquarie, NSW	Labor	Ross Free	0.5	1.89	1.39	Alasdair Webster	Liberal
Northern Territory, NT	Labor	John Reeves	1.9	3.29	1.39	Paul Everingham	Country Liberal
Petrie, Qld	Labor	Dean Wells	1.5	2.13	0.63	John Hodges	Liberal
Riverina-Darling, NSW	Labor	notional – new seat	1.3	5.90	4.60	Noel Hicks	National

- Members listed in italics did not contest their seat at this election.

== Analysis ==
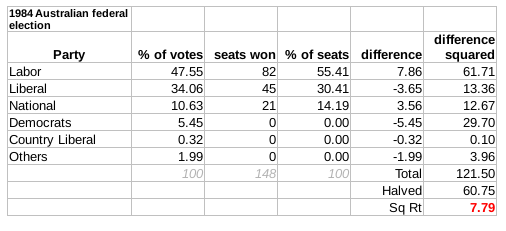
The Gallagher Index result: 7.79

The results of the election surprised most analysts; the expectation had been that Bob Hawke – who had been polling a record ACNielsen approval rating of 75 percent on the eve of the election – would win by a significantly larger margin. Labor instead suffered a 2-point swing against it and had its majority cut from 25 to 16. Hawke blamed the result on the changes to Senate vote cards, which he believed confused people regarding their House of Representatives votes and contributed to the relatively high informal vote, the majority of which apparently was Labor votes. However, analysis by the Australian Electoral Commission found that informal voting only slightly reduced Labor's primary vote and did not change the result in any division.

Andrew Peacock did well from a good performance in the one leaders' debate, held on 26 November 1984, which was the first televised leaders' debate in Australia. It was because of Peacock's performance at the leaders' debate that Hawke refused to debate John Howard for the 1987 election. Ironically when Hawke agreed to do the leaders' debate for the 1990 election it was again with Peacock.

== See also ==
- Candidates of the 1984 Australian federal election
- Members of the Australian House of Representatives, 1984-1987
- Members of the Australian Senate, 1985-1987
