= Daniel McKellar =

Scottish footballer

Personal information
- Full name: Daniel McKellar
- Date of birth: 1892
- Place of birth: Glasgow, Scotland
- Date of death: 13 April 1918 (aged 25–26)
- Place of death: West Flanders, Belgium
- Position: Forward

Senior career*
Years	Team	Apps	(Gls)
- Ashfield
–1914	Bellshill Athletic		
1914	Airdrieonians	3	(0)
1914–1916	Kilmarnock	37	(1)
- * Club domestic league appearances and goals

Daniel McKellar (1892 – 13 April 1918) was a Scottish professional footballer who played as a forward in the Scottish League for Kilmarnock and Airdrieonians.

== Personal life ==
McKellar served as a private in the Highland Light Infantry during the First World War and was killed in action in West Flanders on 13 April 1918. He is commemorated on the Ploegsteert Memorial.

== Career statistics ==
Appearances and goals by club, season and competition
Club	Season	League			Scottish Cup		Total	
Club	Season	Division	Apps	Goals	Apps	Goals	Apps	Goals
Airdrieonians	1913–14	Scottish First Division	3	0	1	0	4	0
Kilmarnock	1914–15	Scottish First Division	24	1	―		24	1
Kilmarnock	1915–16	Scottish First Division	13	0	―		13	0
Kilmarnock	Total		37	1	―		37	1
Career total			40	1	1	0	41	1
