= Peter Kelland =

English cricketer

Personal information
- Born: 20 September 1926; Pinner, Middlesex, England
- Died: 24 October 2011 (aged 85); Loughborough, Leicestershire, England
- Batting: Right-handed
- Bowling: Right-arm fast-medium

Domestic team information
- Years: Team
- 1951–1952: Sussex
- 1949–1950: Cambridge University

Career statistics
Competition	First-class
Matches	15
Runs scored	72
Batting average	9.00
100s/50s	–/–
Top score	25
Balls bowled	2,441
Wickets	27
Bowling average	39.00
5 wickets in innings	–
10 wickets in match	–
Best bowling	3/24
Catches/stumpings	4/–
- Source: Cricinfo, 22 July 2012

Peter Alban Kelland (20 September 1926 – 24 October 2011) was an English cricketer. Kelland was a right-handed batsman who bowled right-arm fast-medium. He was born at Pinner, Middlesex, to Parents Rev Alban Joseph Kelland and Stella Prynne.

Kelland was educated at Repton School during World War II, where he was Head of his House and played in the school cricket team. Alongside Donald Carr, the school's captain, he was the school's main bowler, taking 43 wickets in 1944. No school side Repton played against during this period managed to make a score of at least 100 against them. After leaving Repton, he spent two years in the Royal Marines. After two years in the Marines he began his studies at the University of Cambridge. He made his first-class debut for Cambridge University Cricket Club against Sussex at Fenner's in 1949. He made eleven further first-class appearances for the university, the last of which came against Oxford University in The University Match at Lord's in 1950. In twelve first-class matches for the university, he took 26 wickets at an average of 35.46, with best figures of 3/24. With the bat, he scored 55 runs at a batting average of 9.16, with a high score of 25. In what was a strong Oxford University side of the time, no fewer than eight members of it would go on to represent England in Test cricket.

He later briefly played first-class cricket for Sussex, making three appearances against Cambridge University at Fenner's in 1951 and Worcestershire and Essex in the 1952 County Championship, with both matches played at The Saffrons, Eastbourne. However, he was not successful in these matches, taking just a single wicket, as well as scoring 17 runs. He then went into teaching, after which he never appeared in first-class cricket again. He spent most of his career teaching at Highgate School, London, where he is credited with spotting the cricketing talent of the young Phil Tufnell. He died at Loughborough, Leicestershire, on 24 October 2011.
