= 1989 Liberal Party of Australia leadership spill =

Declaration of a political vcacancy

Liberal Party of Australia Leadership spill, 1989
- 9 May 1989
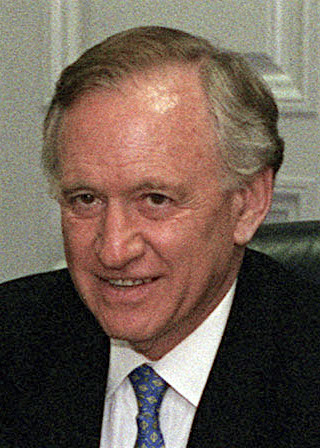

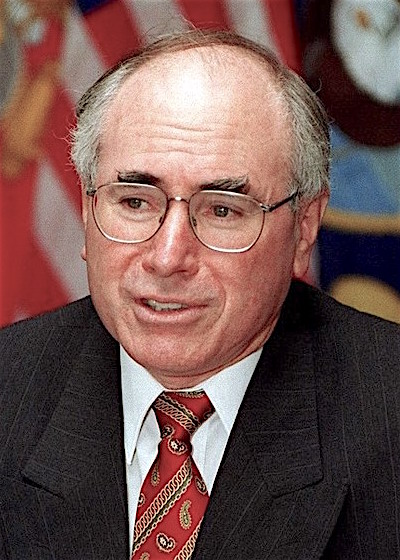
Candidate	Andrew Peacock	John Howard
Caucus vote	44	27
Percentage	62.0%	38.0%
Leader before election
John Howard
Elected Leader
Andrew Peacock

A spill of the leadership of the Liberal Party of Australia took place on 9 May 1989, following internal maneuverings by supporters of John Howard's long-time rival, Andrew Peacock. The spill was won by Peacock over Howard by 44 votes to 27.

== Background ==
During 1988 Liberal Party President John Elliott was the subject of much leadership speculation which undermined John Howard's leadership. This ended after the safe Liberal seat which Elliott sought, Higgins, didn't become available. In February, Elliott said confidentially to former leader and current deputy leader Andrew Peacock, that he would support Peacock in a leadership challenge against Howard.

In late 1988 John Howard promoted his policy of One Australia which called for an end to Multiculturalism and called for the rate of Asian immigration to Australia to be reduced. There were widespread objections to the policy from within the Liberal Party, including from Victoria Opposition Leader and future Premier Jeff Kennett, New South Wales Premier Nick Greiner, former Prime Minister Malcolm Fraser, and former immigration ministers Ian Macphee and Michael MacKellar. Some political commentators later postulated that the dissent within the Liberal Party over immigration policy weakened Howard's leadership position, contributing to him being overthrown as Liberal Party leader by Peacock.

A core group of Peacock supporters, nicknamed "The Cardinals", conceived plans in the Canberra apartment of one of the Cardinal's, John Moore. Elliott, unable to enter parliament, also lent his support to them to oust Howard. They worked behind the scenes for most of year to get the numbers to replace Howard with Peacock. By the time that former shadow minister Ian Macphee lost his pre-selection, followed soon after by Roger Shipton (who held out against Elliot in Higgins) also was defeated for pre-selection by Peter Costello. After these pre-selection's, it was decided that the time was right to move against Howard.

Peacock wished for Howard's old friend, senator Fred Chaney, to become his deputy leader. It was arranged for on that weekend for Western Australian MP Peter Shack to visit Chaney's home and inform him that there was going to be a leadership challenge the following Tuesday, that the Cardinals had the numbers for it to be successful, and that Chaney could either be a part of it or not. He was shocked at the revelation, but had no hesitation in believing Shack. Reluctantly, after a discussion with his wife, Chaney decided to switch his support, rationalising that he could have remained loyal but it would inevitably precipitate a days long row, which would be very public and very damaging, or could instead remain silent and let it all happen as discreetly as possible. On the same day, Peacock was in Melbourne meeting Elliot's allies when he was informed, by phone, that Chaney had reticently agreed to back Peacock.

On the following Monday, Peacock and Chaney cancelled a dinner engagement with Howard. After dinner, a delegation arrived at Howard's office in Parliament House. Peacock, Chaney, and Chaney's Senate deputy Austin Lewis, being other members of the leadership team, informed Howard that 40 members wanted the matter of leadership raised at the next party meeting. Despite being a key architect in Peacock's comeback, Wilson Tuckey stood for the deputy's position against Chaney, Peacock's declared choice of deputy.

== Candidates ==
- Andrew Peacock, incumbent Deputy Leader, Shadow Treasurer, Member for Kooyong
- John Howard, incumbent Leader, Member for Bennelong

== Results ==
Liberal Party of Australia deputy leadership ballot, 1989
- 9 May 1989
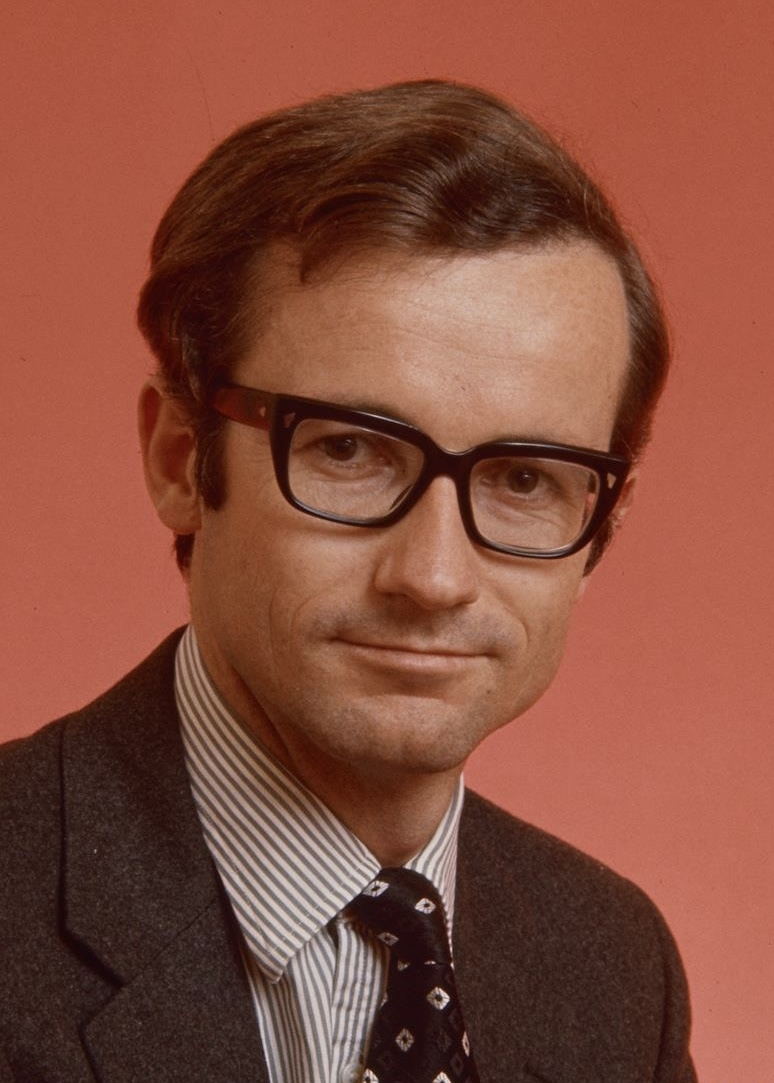

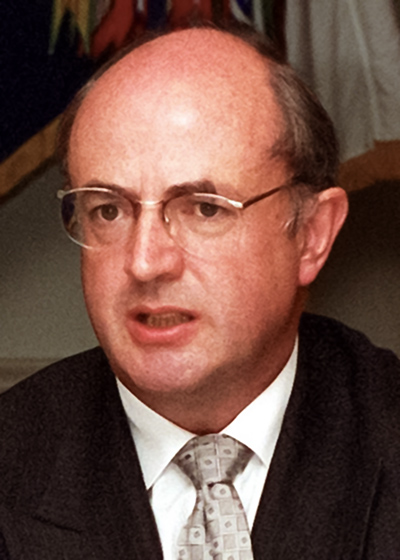

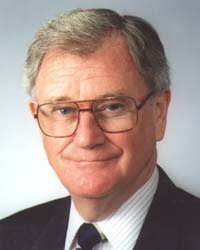

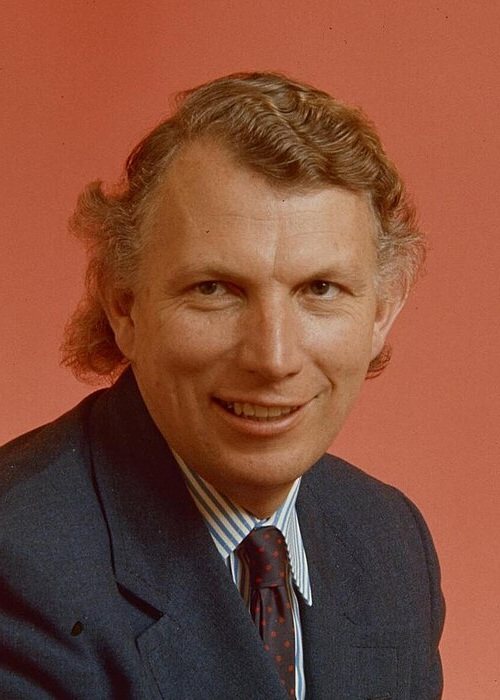
Candidate	Fred Chaney	Peter Reith
First ballot	31 (43.7%)	23 (32.4%)
Second ballot	44 (62.0%)]	27 (38.0%)
Candidate	Wilson Tuckey	Ian Wilson
First ballot	11 (15.5%)	6 (8.5%)
Second ballot	Eliminated	Eliminated
Deputy Leader before election
Andrew Peacock
Elected Deputy Leader
Fred Chaney

The following tables gives the ballot results:

Spill motion to vacate leadership
Support	Votes
Yes	43
No	28

=== Leadership ballot ===
Name	Votes	Percentage
Andrew Peacock	44	62.0
John Howard	27	38.0

=== Deputy leadership ballot ===
Name	First round	Second round
Fred Chaney	31	44
Peter Reith	23	27
Wilson Tuckey	11	Eliminated
Ian Wilson	6	Eliminated

== Aftermath ==
This spill saw Peacock return to the leadership almost four years after his resignation in September 1985. Chaney succeeded Peacock as Deputy Leader. Declining Peacock's offer of Shadow Minister for Education, Howard went to the backbenches. Howard expressed his doubts on a future leadership comeback famously saying it would be "like Lazarus with a triple bypass".Later, in October, Howard did accept an offer to return to the frontbench as Shadow Minister for Industry, Technology and Commerce.

In the subsequent press conference after the ballot, Peacock was asked "Are you a recycled failed leader?" Peacock responded that it reminded him of his predecessor in Kooyong (Sir Robert Menzies) who once resigned the party leadership only to mount a comeback and "became the most resilient and longest serving prime minister" in Australia's history and he looked forward to repeating that.

A new period of party disunity ensued and Peacock's victory was soured as highlighted by that weeks Four Corners episode detailing the coup against Howard. Some of the Cardinals appeared on Four Corners detailing their dishonest methods with one Wilson Tuckey saying "At times, I guess by downright lying" to which Peacock stated he found "quite tasteless" in a later interview about the episode. Howard gave multiple interviews detailing his displeasure that he had been removed from the leadership using dishonest tactics. Shack stated in a 1994 interview; "I think he used it mercilessly. John Howard basically hit the airwaves of Australia, basically television and radio, putting forward the view that he, honest John, had been robbed of his rightful leadership of the Liberal Party by a gang of thugs."

Howard did eventually return to the leadership in January 1995 and became Prime Minister when he led the Coalition to victory at the 1996 election.
