= 1987 Liberal Party of Australia leadership spill =

Leadership spill in Australia

Liberal Party of Australia leadership election, 1987
- 17 July 1987
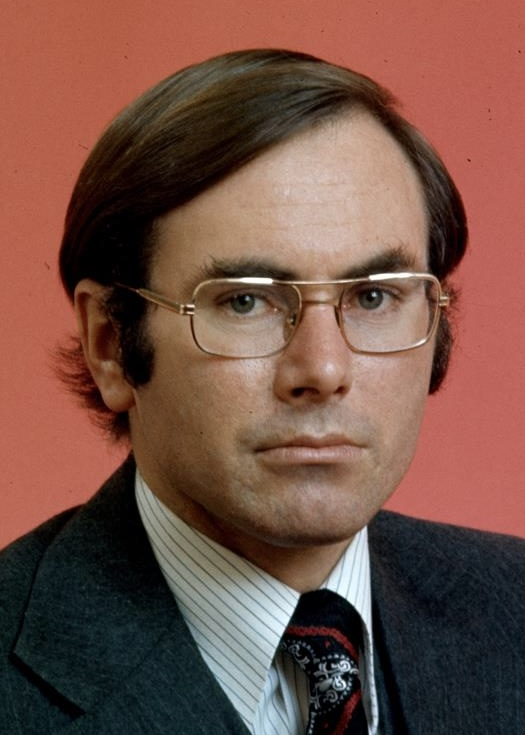

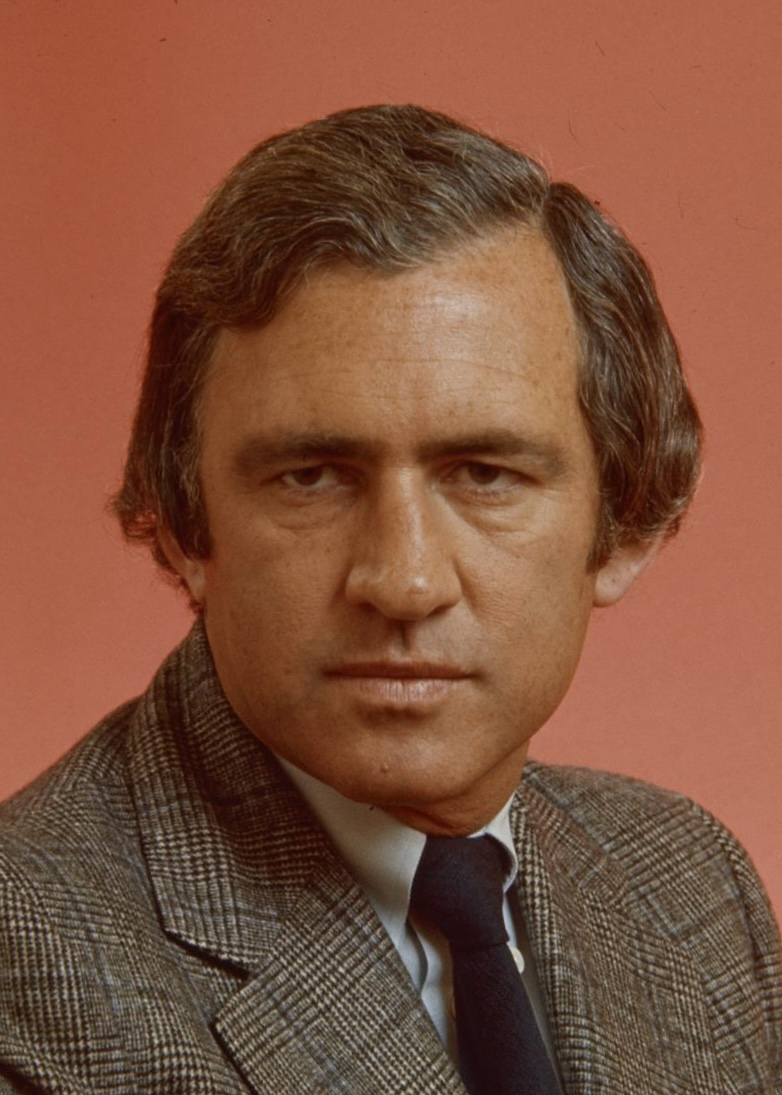
Candidate	John Howard	Andrew Peacock
Caucus vote	41	28
Percentage	59.4%	40.6%
Seat	Bennelong (NSW)	Kooyong (Vic.)
Leader before election
John Howard
Elected Leader
John Howard

A spill of the leadership of the Liberal Party of Australia took place on 17 July 1987, following John Howard's loss in the 1987 federal election by previous leader Andrew Peacock. The spill was won by Howard against Peacock by 41 votes to 28.

Peacock was then elected deputy leader with 36 votes over Fred Chaney with 24, Michael MacKellar with 6 and John Moore with 3.

== Candidates ==
- John Howard, incumbent Leader, Member for Bennelong
- Andrew Peacock, former Leader, Member for Kooyong

== Results ==
Liberal Party of Australia deputy leadership ballot, 1987
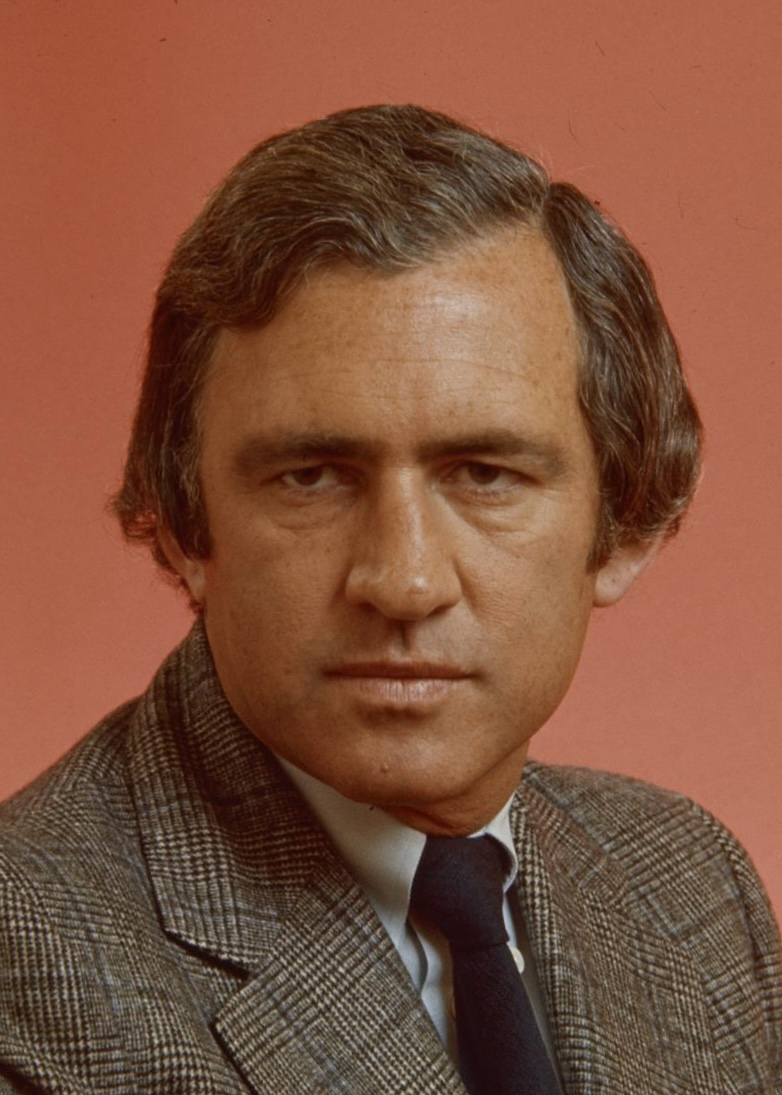

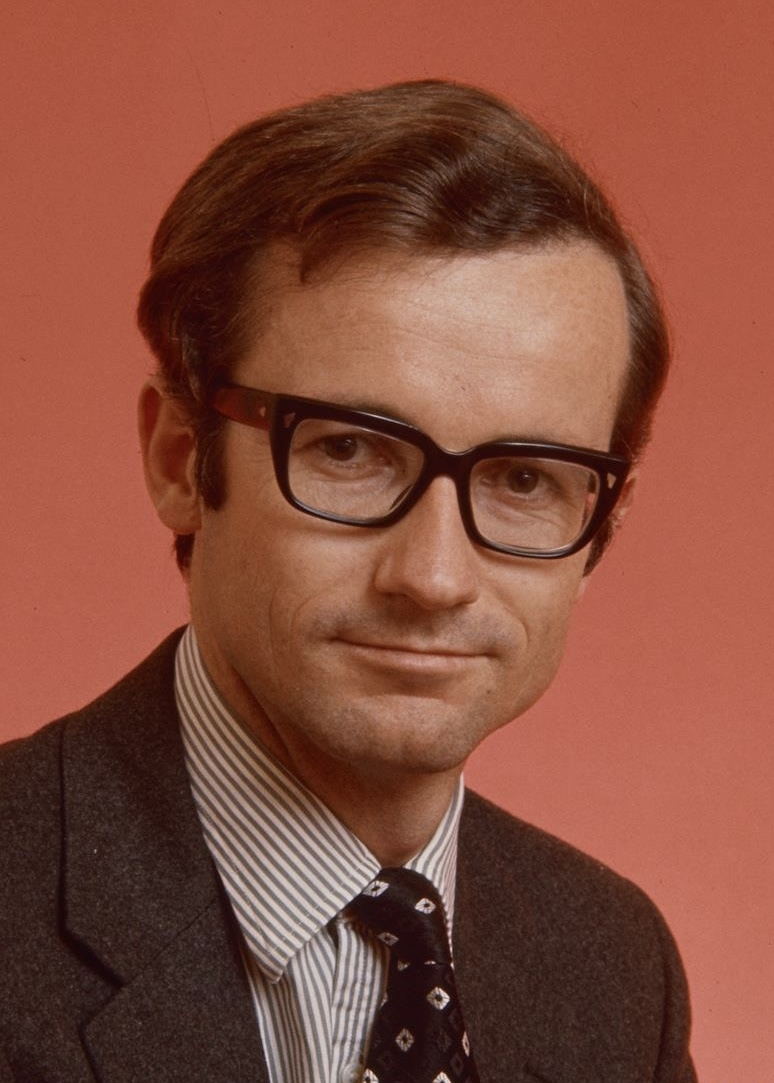

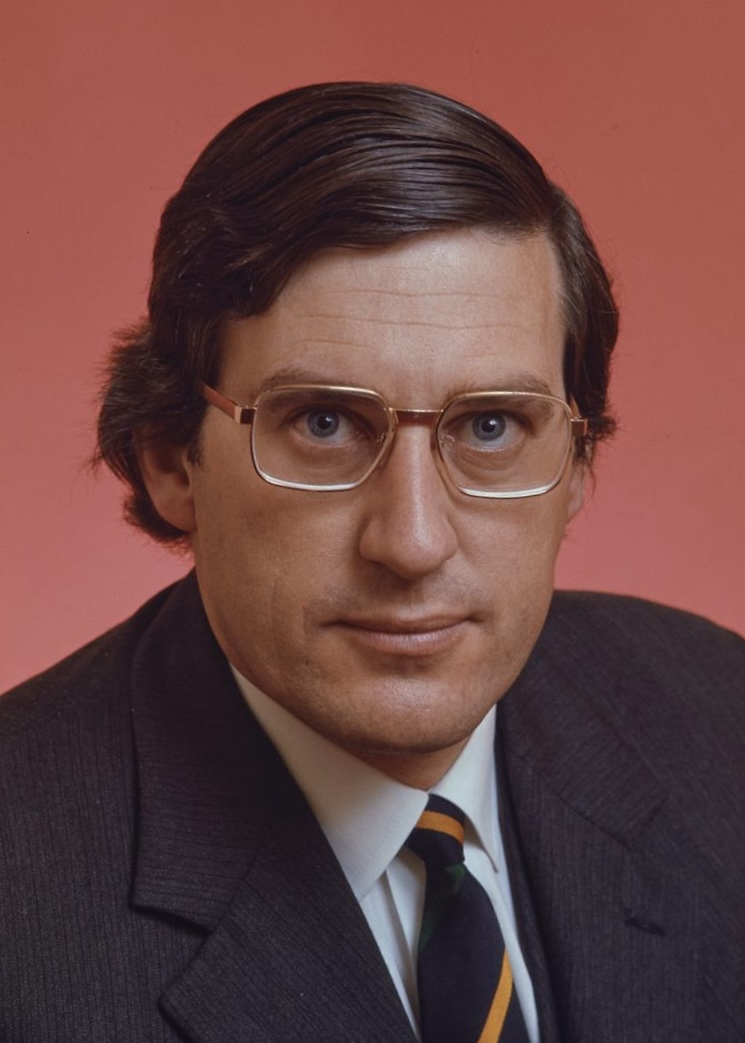

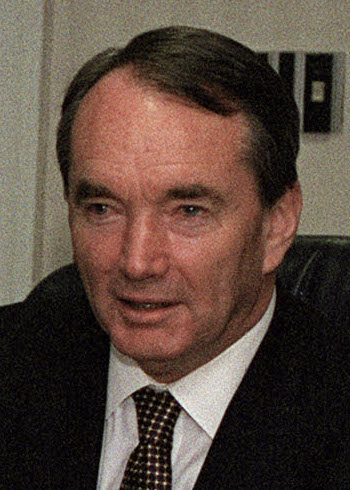
Candidate	Andrew Peacock	Fred Chaney
Caucus vote	36 (52.2%)	24 (34.8%)
Seat	Kooyong (Vic.)	Senator for Western Australia
Candidate	Michael MacKellar	John Moore
Caucus vote	6 (8.7%)	3 (4.4%)
Seat	Warringah (NSW)	Ryan (Qld.)
Deputy Leader before election
Neil Brown
Elected Deputy Leader
Andrew Peacock

The following tables gives the ballot results:

=== Leadership ballot ===
Candidate	Final ballot	%
John Howard	41	59.4
Andrew Peacock	28	40.6

=== Deputy leadership ballot ===
Candidate	Final ballot	%
Andrew Peacock	36	52.2
Fred Chaney	24	34.8
Michael MacKellar	6	8.7
John Moore	3	4.4

Other candidates in order of elimination:

- John Spender
- David Connolly
- Peter Shack
- Ian Wilson
- Neil Brown
- Harry Edwards
- Wilson Tuckey
