= 1983 Liberal Party of Australia leadership election =

Liberal Party of Australia leadership election, 1983
- 11 March 1983
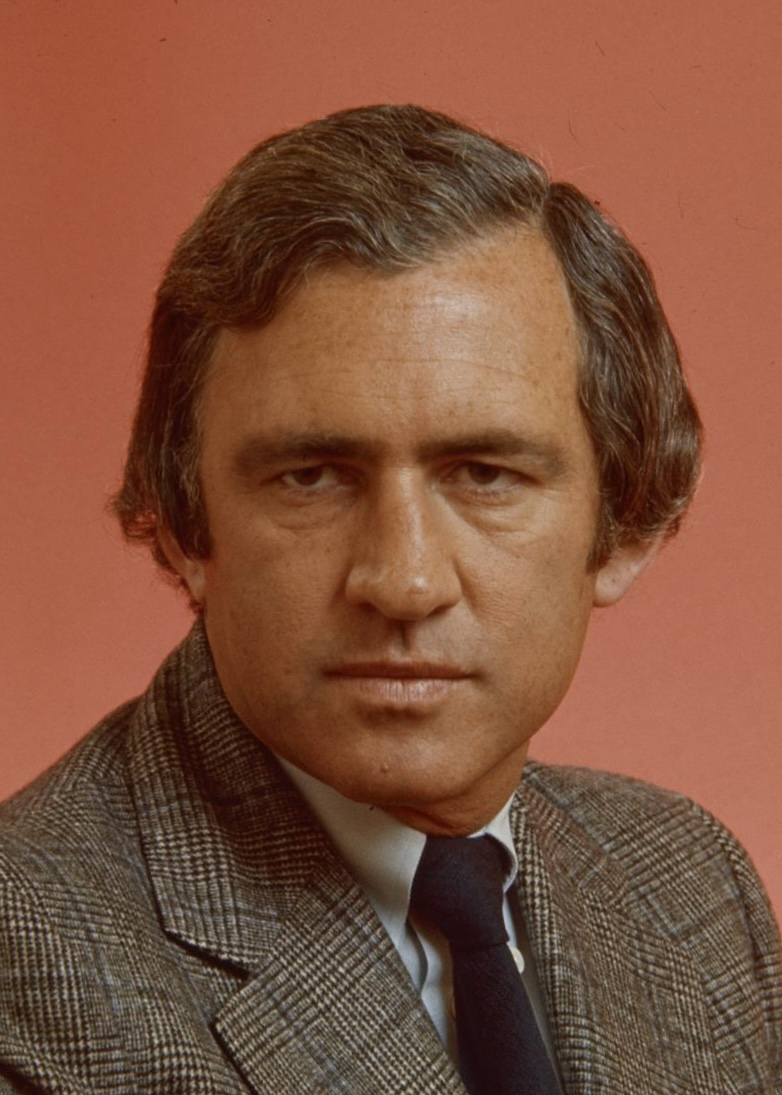

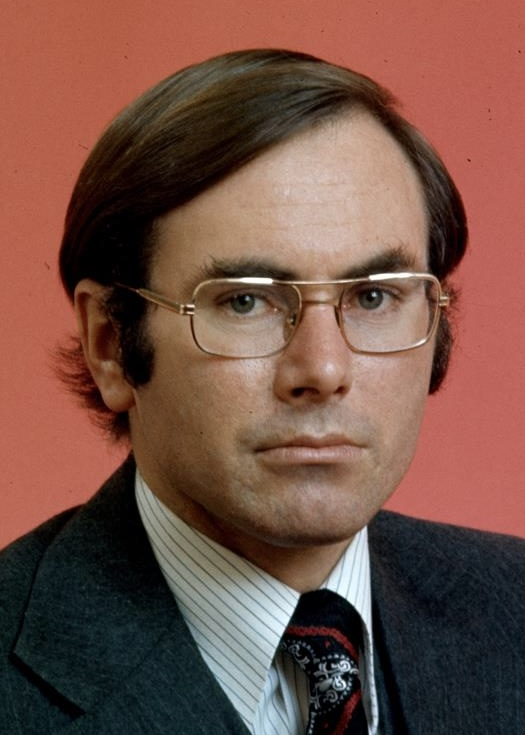
Candidate	Andrew Peacock	John Howard
Caucus vote	36	20
Percentage	64.3%	35.7%
Seat	Kooyong (Vic.)	Bennelong (NSW)
Leader before election
Malcolm Fraser
Elected Leader
Andrew Peacock

An election for the leadership of the Liberal Party of Australia took place on 11 March 1983, following the resignation of Malcolm Fraser following his defeat at the 1983 federal election. The contest was won by Andrew Peacock over John Howard by 36 votes to 20.

== Candidates ==
- John Howard, incumbent deputy leader, former treasurer, member for Bennelong
- Andrew Peacock, former minister for industry, member for Kooyong

== Background ==
Outgoing Prime Minister Malcolm Fraser resigned his leadership on the 6th of March after losing the 1983 election to Bob Hawke in order to allow the party to refresh and unite. Likewise, he would go on to resign his seat in parliament, at the relatively young, age of 52. Acknowledging he still had a strong and keen interest in politics but wanted to allow the party to grow under new leadership.

== Results ==
Liberal Party of Australia deputy leadership ballot, 1983

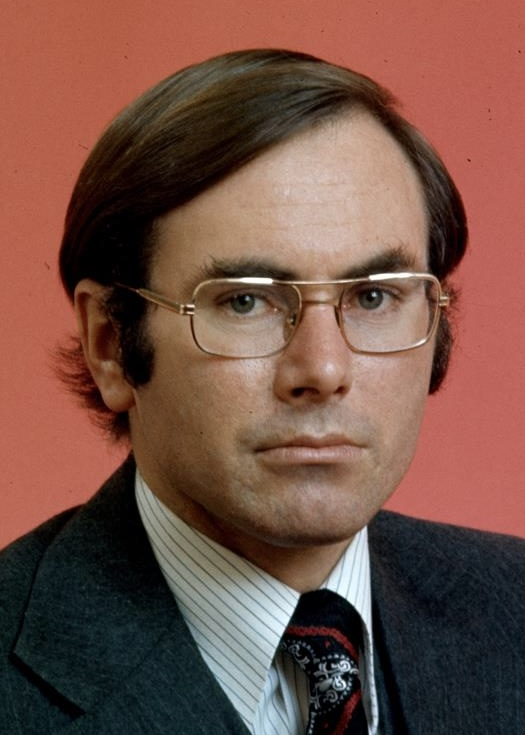

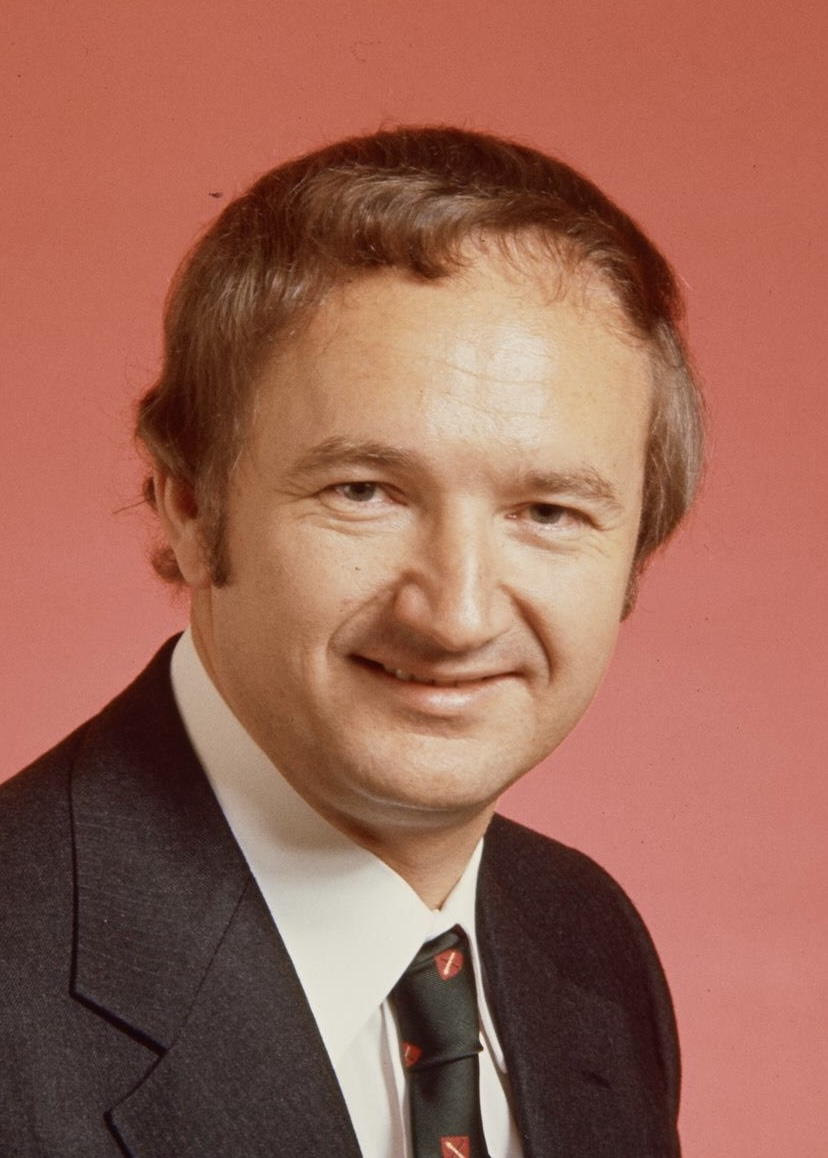

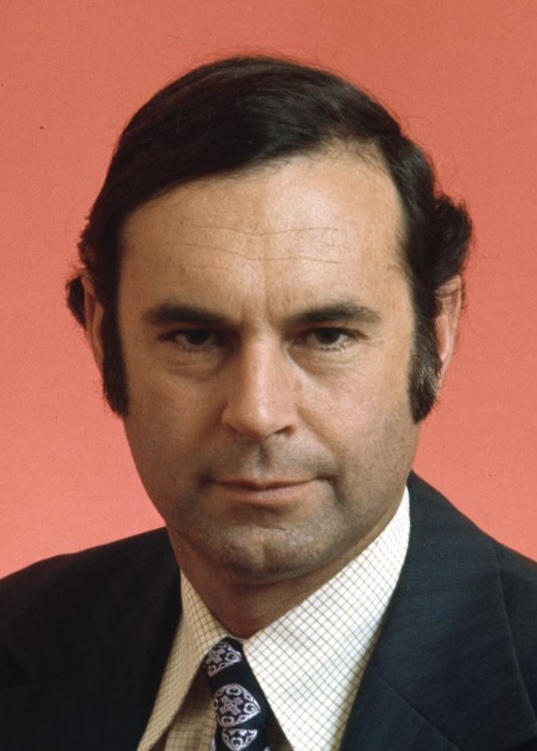

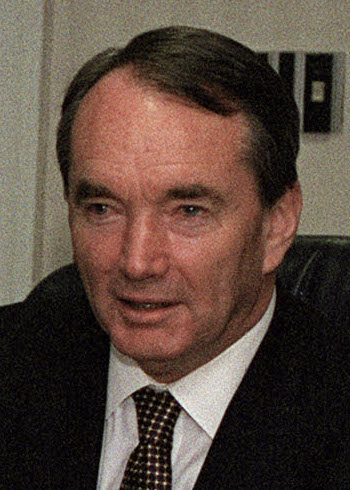

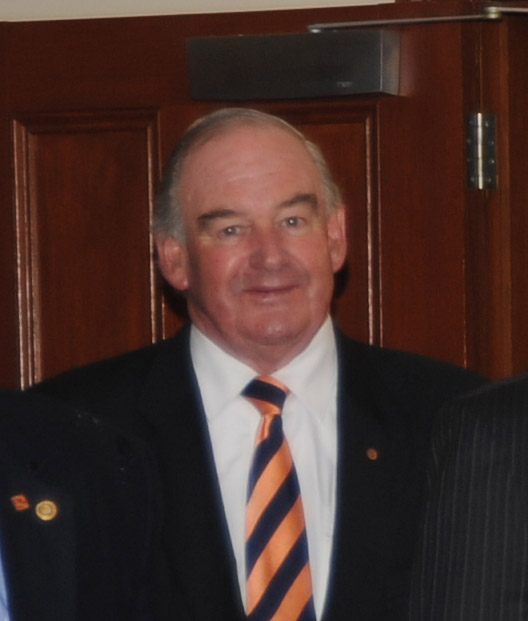
Candidate	John Howard	Ian Macphee	Steele Hall
Caucus vote	30 (53.6%)	12 (21.4%)	9 (16.1%)
Candidate	John Moore	Michael Hodgman
Caucus vote	3 (5.4%)	2 (3.6%)
Deputy Leader before election
John Howard
Elected Deputy Leader
John Howard

The following tables gives the ballot results:

=== Leadership ballot ===
Name	Votes	Percentage
Andrew Peacock	36	64.3
John Howard	20	35.7

=== Deputy leadership ballot ===
Candidate	Votes	%
John Howard	30	53.6
Ian Macphee	12	21.4
Steele Hall	9	16.1
John Moore	3	5.4
Michael Hodgman	2	3.6

== Aftermath ==
The Liberal Party under the leadership of Peacock went on to lose the 1984 election to a politically and electorally strong Prime Minister Bob Hawke. The Liberal Party and Peacock Leadership had already been viewed by some as divided and fragile, as such would eventually result in Howard winning leadership in 1985

== See also ==
- 1983 Australian federal election
