= Andrew Peacock =

Australian politician (1939–2021)

The Honourable Andrew Peacock AC GCL
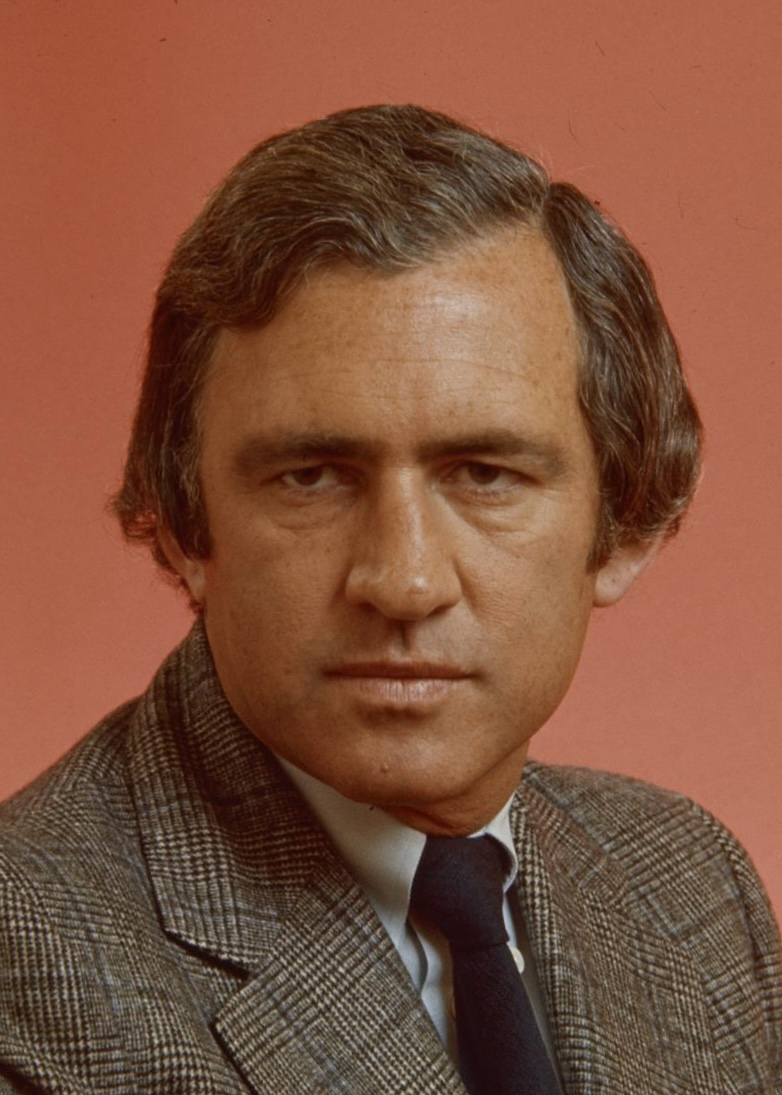
- Official portrait, 1974

Leader of the Opposition
- In office 9 May 1989 – 3 April 1990
- Prime Minister: Bob Hawke
- Deputy: Fred Chaney
- Preceded by: John Howard
- Succeeded by: John Hewson
- In office 11 March 1983 – 5 September 1985
- Prime Minister: Bob Hawke
- Deputy: John Howard
- Preceded by: Bob Hawke
- Succeeded by: John Howard

17th Ambassador of Australia to the United States
- In office 2 February 1997 – 27 February 1999
- Nominated by: John Howard
- Preceded by: John McCarthy
- Succeeded by: Michael Thawley
Party leadership positions
7th Leader of the Liberal Party
In office 9 May 1989 – 3 April 1990
Deputy	Fred Chaney
Preceded by	John Howard
Succeeded by	John Hewson
In office 11 March 1983 – 5 September 1985
Deputy	John Howard
Preceded by	Malcolm Fraser
Succeeded by	John Howard
Deputy Leader of the Liberal Party
In office 17 July 1987 – 9 May 1989
Leader	John Howard
Preceded by	Neil Brown
Succeeded by	Fred Chaney
Cabinet posts
Minister for Industry and Commerce
In office 11 October 1982 – 11 March 1983
Prime Minister	Malcolm Fraser
Preceded by	Phillip Lynch
Succeeded by	John Button
Minister for Industrial Relations
In office 3 November 1980 – 16 April 1981
Prime Minister	Malcolm Fraser
Preceded by	Tony Street
Succeeded by	Ian Viner
Minister for Foreign Affairs
In office 11 November 1975 – 3 November 1980
Prime Minister	Malcolm Fraser
Preceded by	Don Willesee
Succeeded by	Tony Street
Minister for the Environment
In office 12 November 1975 – 22 December 1975
Prime Minister	Malcolm Fraser
Preceded by	Joe Berinson
Succeeded by	Ivor Greenwood
Minister for External Territories
In office 25 January 1972 – 5 December 1972
Prime Minister	William McMahon
Preceded by	Charles Barnes
Succeeded by	Gough Whitlam
Minister for the Army
In office 12 November 1969 – 2 February 1972
Prime Minister	John Gorton; William McMahon
Preceded by	Phillip Lynch
Succeeded by	Bob Katter, Sr.

Member of the Australian Parliament for Kooyong
- In office 2 April 1966 – 17 September 1994
- Preceded by: Robert Menzies
- Succeeded by: Petro Georgiou

Personal details
- Born: Andrew Sharp Peacock; 13 February 1939 Melbourne, Victoria, Australia
- Died: 16 April 2021 (aged 82) Austin, Texas, U.S.
- Party: Liberal
- Spouses: Susan Rossiter (m. 1963; div. 1978) Margaret Ingram (m. 1983; div. 1995) Penne Korth (m. 2002)
- Relations: John Rossiter (father-in-law)
- Children: 3
- Education: Scotch College
- Alma mater: University of Melbourne

Andrew Sharp Peacock (13 February 1939 – 16 April 2021) was an Australian politician and diplomat. He served as a cabinet minister and went on to become leader of the Liberal Party on two occasions (1983–1985 and 1989–1990), leading the party to defeat at the 1984 and 1990 elections.

Peacock was born in Melbourne and attended Elsternwick Primary School and Scotch College before studying law at the University of Melbourne. A former president of the Young Liberals, he was elected to Parliament at the age of 27, filling the blue-ribbon seat of Kooyong, vacated by Sir Robert Menzies. Peacock was appointed to cabinet in 1969 by John Gorton and later served under William McMahon and Malcolm Fraser. He held a variety of portfolios, most notably serving as Minister for Foreign Affairs from 1975 to 1980. He unsuccessfully challenged Fraser for the Liberal leadership in 1982, but was then elected as Fraser's successor following the party's defeat at the 1983 election.

At the 1984 election, the Peacock-led Coalition slightly reduced the Labor Party's majority. He resigned the Liberal leadership the following year after failing to have his deputy John Howard removed; he was duly replaced by Howard. He remained a member of the shadow cabinet, and in 1987 unsuccessfully challenged Howard for the leadership; he was instead elected deputy leader. Peacock returned as leader in 1989. However, his second term lasted less than a year, as he resigned after another electoral defeat in 1990; he had won the popular vote but failed to win enough seats. Peacock left politics in 1994 and was later appointed Ambassador to the United States, serving from 1997 to 1999.

== Early life ==
Peacock was born on 13 February 1939 in Melbourne, Victoria, the son of Andrew Sharp Peacock Sr and his wife, Iris Lamb. His father was a marine engineer and one of the founders of Peacock and Smith Ltd, a large shipbuilding firm. He was educated at Scotch College and at the University of Melbourne, where he graduated in law. In 1963, he married Susan Rossiter (1942–2016), the daughter of Victorian Liberal MLA Sir John Rossiter. They had three daughters, including the horse trainer Jane Chapple-Hyam.

== Early political career ==
Peacock unsuccessfully contested the seat of Yarra in the 1961 federal election, although he bucked the national trend by increasing the Liberal primary vote, impressing party elders. He was president of the Young Liberals in 1962, and by 1965 he was president of the Victorian Liberal Party.

In February 1966, former prime minister Sir Robert Menzies resigned, triggering a by-election in Kooyong, the eastern Melbourne electorate that he had held for 32 years. Peacock gained Liberal preselection, making him the favourite in this comfortably safe Liberal seat. The Liberals (and their predecessors) had held the seat since Federation in 1901, usually without serious difficulty. As expected, he won 2 April by-election, albeit with a slightly reduced majority. He easily retained his seat in the general election held seven months later.

== Ministerial career ==
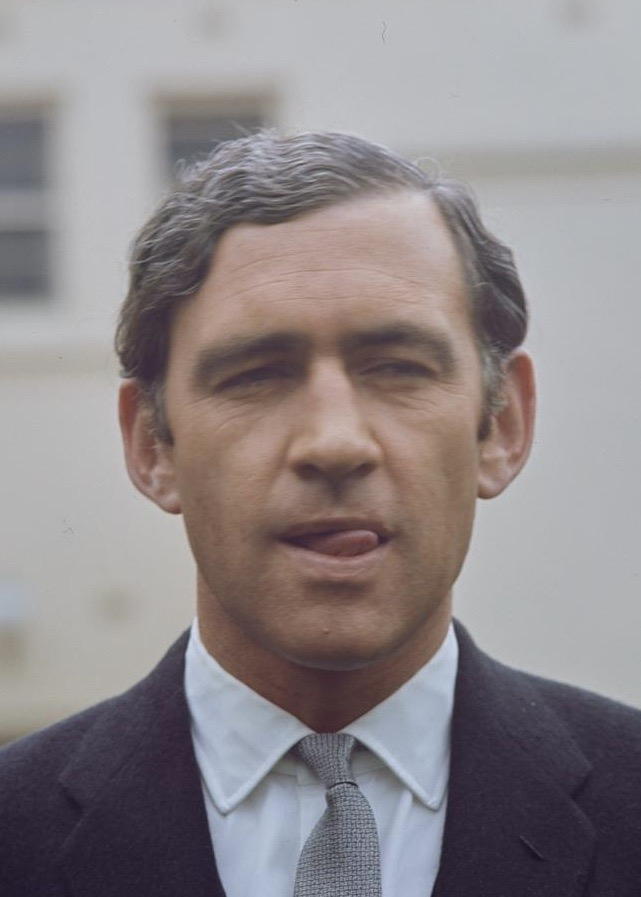
Peacock after being sworn in as Army Minister in 1969.

In November 1969 Peacock was appointed to the Second Gorton Ministry as Minister for the Army, and in this role played a minor part in the drama which brought down then prime minister John Gorton in 1971. In 1972, William McMahon made him Minister for Territories, in charge of Australia's colonial possession, Papua New Guinea, where he was responsible for bringing in self-government.

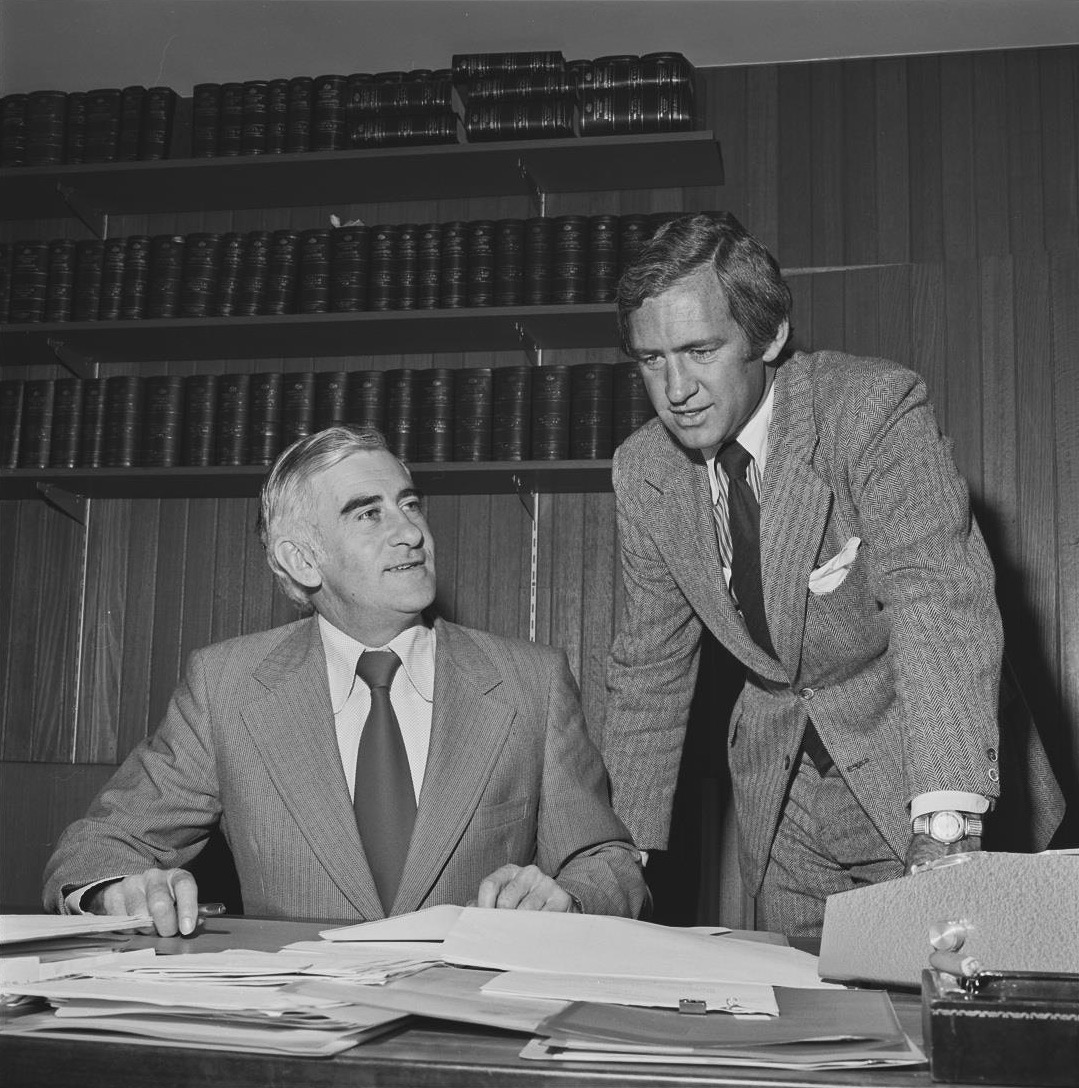
Peacock with Billy Snedden on 12 October 1973

When the Liberals went into opposition in December 1972, Peacock became a senior member of the Liberal frontbench. As a party moderate, he was a supporter of the new leader, Billy Snedden. When Snedden lost the 1974 election, Peacock began to be seen as a leadership candidate, but it was Malcolm Fraser who took the initiative and deposed Snedden in 1975. Fraser made Peacock foreign affairs spokesperson, and when Fraser became caretaker prime minister, Peacock became minister for foreign affairs, a position he retained when Fraser led the Liberals to victory in the subsequent December 1975 election. Peacock said before the 1975 election that "the US has no needs to take sides" because the ANZUS treaty had bipartisan support.

He served as foreign minister until 1980. He had a number of acrimonious disputes with Fraser, particularly over the recognition of the Khmer Rouge regime in Cambodia. After the 1980 election he asked for a change of portfolio, and Fraser made him Minister for Industrial Relations in a swap with Tony Street. He also challenged for the deputy leadership against incumbent Phillip Lynch, but was defeated 47 votes to 35. In April 1981 he resigned suddenly, accusing Fraser of constant interference in his portfolio. Fraser called a party meeting, at which Peacock tried to depose him as party leader and therefore prime minister. Fraser managed to fend off this challenge. John Howard succeeded Lynch as deputy leader in the same meeting. Peacock returned to cabinet in October 1982, replacing the retiring Lynch as Minister for Industry and Commerce and holding that position until the defeat of the Fraser government.

== Leader of the Liberal Party ==
Fraser's government was defeated in the March 1983 election by the Labor Party under Bob Hawke. Fraser immediately retired from politics, and Peacock contested the party leadership, defeating Howard, who remained as deputy leader.

As opposition leader, Peacock faced an uphill battle against the hugely popular Hawke.

Unlike the previous time his party was in opposition between 1972 and 1975, first led by Billy Snedden and then by Malcolm Fraser, Peacock did not push for an early election. When an early election was called however in late 1984, he described it as unnecessary and accused Hawke of calling one for fear of the economy turning down in the following year 1985.

At the 1984 election he was given little chance of winning, but he performed better than expected by reducing Hawke's majority. In 1985, as Labor's position in opinion polls improved, Peacock's popularity sank and Howard's profile rose, keeping leadership speculation alive. Peacock said he would no longer accept Howard as deputy unless he offered assurances that he would not challenge for the leadership. Following Howard's refusal to offer such an assurance, in September 1985 Peacock sought to replace him with John Moore as deputy leader. The party room re-elected Howard as deputy, contrary to Peacock's wishes. Despite possessing greater support in the parliamentary party than Howard, Peacock resigned on 5 September 1985, concluding the situation was untenable. Howard was comfortably elected opposition leader on 5 September, and he appointed Peacock shadow foreign minister. However, after a private car-phone conversation between Peacock and then-Victorian opposition leader (and future Premier) Jeff Kennett severely attacking Howard was leaked to the press, Howard dismissed Peacock from his shadow cabinet in March 1987, calling Peacock's actions "damaging" and "unloyal".

Howard lost the 1987 election to Hawke, largely due to the Nationals pulling out of the Coalition in support of Queensland Premier Joh Bjelke-Petersen's quixotic bid to become Prime Minister. After the election, Peacock stood against Howard for the leadership losing 41 votes to 28, but was elected deputy leader in a show of party unity. Peacock's supporters began to plot against Howard, and in May 1989 they mounted a party room coup which returned Peacock to the leadership. Peacock, now 50, cultivated a new mature image, enhanced by a second marriage to Margaret St George.

On 18 March 1990, Peacock was interviewed by Laurie Oakes on the television program Sunday, regarding his stance on the Multifunction Polis (MFP), a proposal to build a Japanese funded technology city in Australia. Peacock attacked the MFP concept, saying it would become an Asian "enclave". According to Roy Morgan Research, Peacock's attack on the MFP did not help him politically, and the Labor Party used the issue to highlight division within the Liberal Party, as the party federal president John Elliott and others supported the MFP. The following day, The Australian newspaper ran a headline titled Peacock a 'danger in the Lodge'.'

At the 1990 election, the Coalition won a slim majority (50.10 per cent) of the two-party vote and took seven seats from Labor. It also reduced Labor's majority from 24 seats to nine. However, it only garnered a 0.93 per cent two-party swing. Combined with a three per cent swing against the Nationals (who saw their leader Charles Blunt ousted in his own seat), this prevented the Coalition from picking up the additional seven seats they needed to make Peacock prime minister. This was all despite Hawke's government being in political trouble, with record high interest rates and a financial crisis in Victoria. Although Peacock was credited with helping the non-Labor forces regain much of what they had lost three years earlier, it was not enough to save his job, and he resigned after the election, promising not to make another attempt to return to the leadership.

He became shadow attorney-general (1990–92) and shadow trade minister (1992–93) under the new leader, John Hewson, whom Peacock had supported in getting the job in 1990 over Peter Reith and to stop Howard returning. After Hewson's election as leader, he endorsed Peacock as his deputy, which caused a furore with Howard supporters. Peacock, however, had no interest in becoming deputy leader again and withdrew happily. Reith was instead elected deputy in a close contest against Peacock supporter David Jull. The closeness of the deputy's contest was seen as a reflection of the tensions in the Peacock-Howard rivalry that still existed as Reith had been Howard's running mate when Peacock overthrew Howard almost a year earlier. This tension was not reflected in the leadership contest as both Hewson and Reith had supported Howard and Hewson was elected with a lopsided margin of 62 votes to 13 votes for Reith. Peacock believed Hewson to be the best man for the job after seeing that Hewson was a hard-working shadow treasurer.

Peacock returned to Foreign Affairs when Hewson lost the 1993 election to Paul Keating. He retained Foreign Affairs when Hewson was displaced by Alexander Downer, whom Peacock supported after Hewson initiated the May 1994 spill. Peacock believed Hewson made a mistake in calling a spill; Peacock was not aware of Hewson's intention before it happened but decided afterwards to support Alexander Downer as he felt no longer obligated to support John Hewson.

== After politics ==
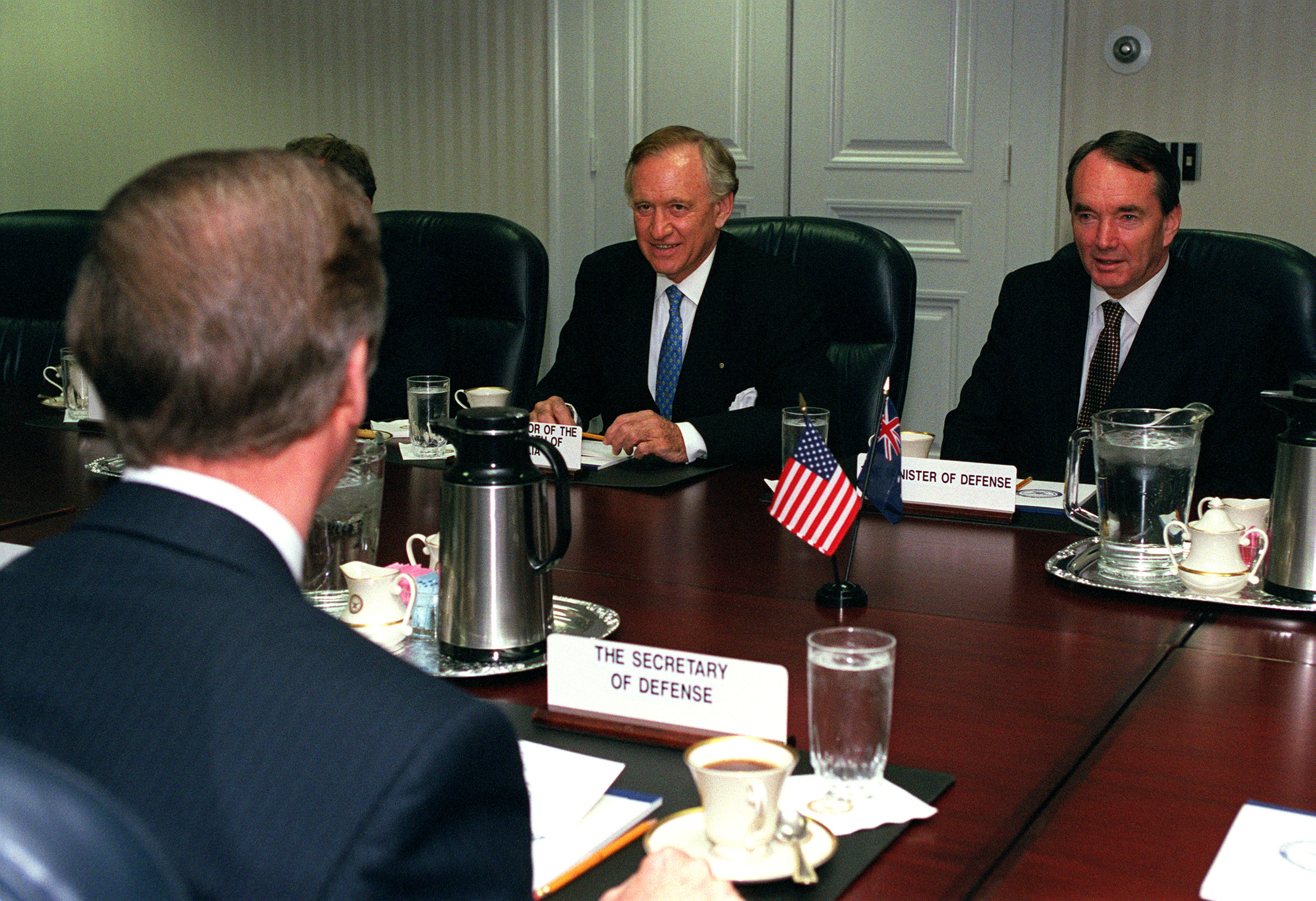
Ambassador Peacock and Minister for Defence John Moore at the Pentagon in 1999.

Peacock resigned from Parliament on 17 September 1994. In 1996, when asked about blocking John Howard, Malcolm Fraser said Peacock obviously had been, while Peacock claimed he supported John Hewson continuing. When Howard became Prime Minister in 1996, he appointed Peacock as the Australian Ambassador to the United States. Following the close of this appointment in 1999, Peacock mostly resided in the United States.

In 2002 he married Penne Percy Korth, a Washington, D.C., society figure and former United States Ambassador to Mauritius. Midway through 2002 Peacock joined Boeing Australia Holdings as President of Boeing Australia. He retired from Boeing in 2007, and joined Gold Coast-based fund manager MFS Ltd as chairman. He held the position for 15 months, during its name change to Octaviar, resigning shortly before the firm collapsed with debts of $2.5 billion. He later stated: "I should have looked more carefully at MFS before going into it. The business wasn't going well, and I thought I could turn it around but I couldn't."

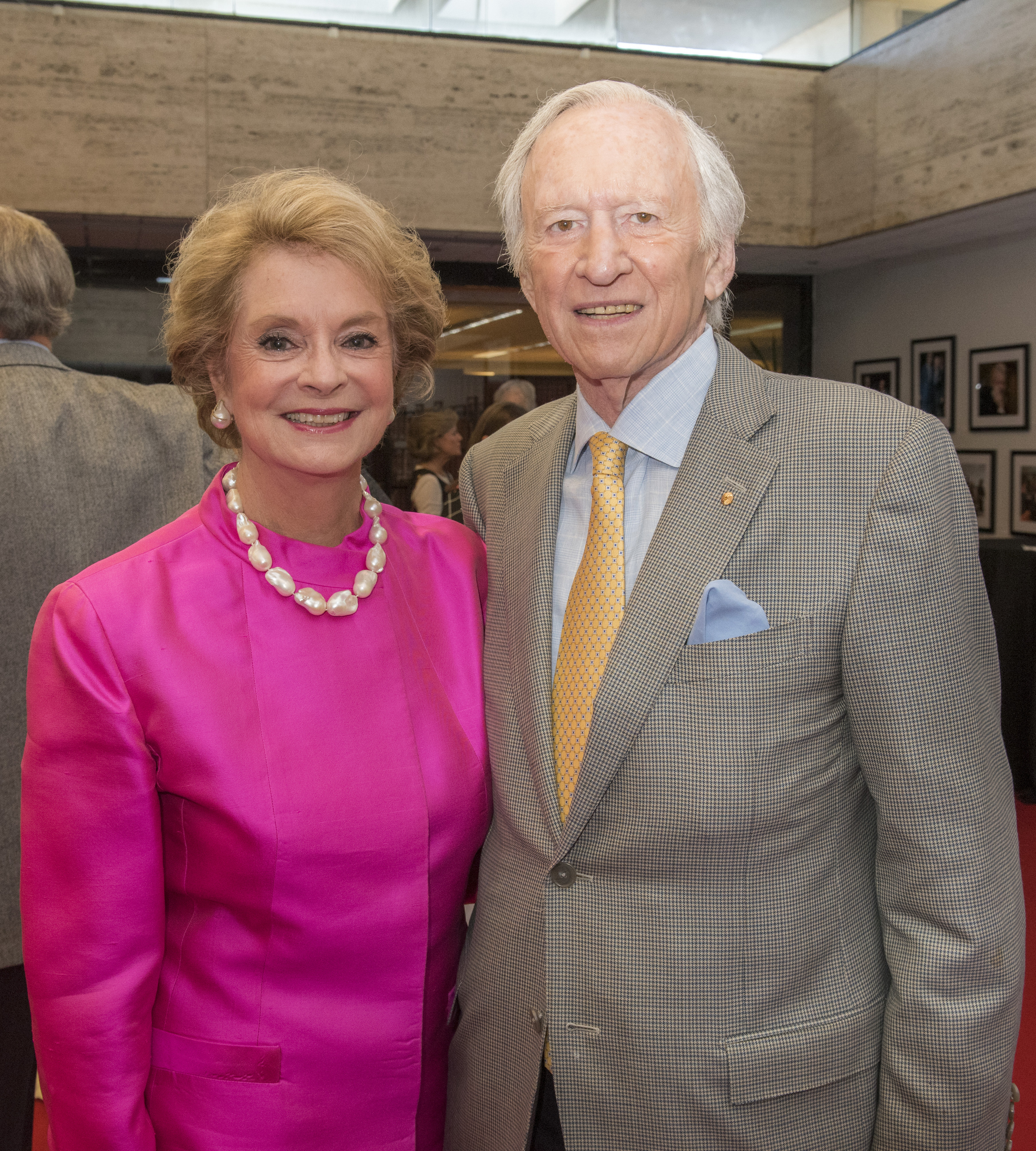
Peacock with his third wife Penne Percy Korth Peacock at the LBJ Presidential Library in 2016

Peacock and his American-born third wife, Penne Peacock, retired to Austin, Texas, where she had gone to university. He visited Australia regularly and did not intend to become a U.S. citizen, although he held a green card. He gave up drinking after moving to the U.S., after experiencing heart problems. Peacock supported Donald Trump in the 2016 U.S. presidential election, after originally supporting Marco Rubio in the Republican primaries. He placed a bet on Trump to become president even before the first primary, at odds of 16–1. In a January 2018 interview with the Australian Financial Review, he said he was "disquieted by the first year's performance", praising Trump's tax cuts but expressing his disappointment with Trump's decisions to withdraw from the Trans-Pacific Partnership and recognise Jerusalem as the capital of Israel. Peacock said that his wife is a staunch conservative and regards him as "the most liberal person she's ever met". He expressed dismay at the disappearance of moderate Republicans, and the general polarisation of American politics.

== Death and legacy ==
Peacock died at his Austin home on 16 April 2021, aged 82. No cause of death was provided, although it was noted by Derryn Hinch that he had "significant medical problems". Obituaries emphasised "his impact on Australia's foreign policy and international relations", describing Peacock as having "left an indelible mark on the country".

Upon his death, Peacock's former rival John Howard reflected that Peacock was "a hugely significant figure in Australian politics of the 70s and 80s" and "played a dominant role in the development of the Liberal Party", praising Peacock as a "quite outstanding foreign minister" who as Minister for External Territories "helped lay the foundation for Papua New Guinea to become independent". His friend and former Victorian Premier Jeff Kennett said that "As the Colt of Kooyong he and his then wife Susan carried the aspirations of the Liberal Party", and lamented "that he did not become Prime Minister of the country was probably a reflection more of his generous character more than crass ambition".

Then-Prime Minister Scott Morrison described Peacock as "one of our greatest Liberals, who helped shape Australia and the Liberal Party over three decades", and praised his record as Foreign Minister, noting that "he was vocal in his denunciation of the Pol Pot regime in Kampuchea, despising what he called that 'loathsome regime'". Tributes were also paid by, among others, then-Opposition Leader Anthony Albanese, deputy Liberal leader Josh Frydenberg, former Liberal Prime Ministers Malcolm Turnbull and Tony Abbott, former Labor Prime Ministers Kevin Rudd and Julia Gillard, and former Opposition leader John Hewson.

Peacock was given a state memorial service at St Paul's Cathedral in Melbourne on 11 February 2022; the 10 month delay being attributed to the effects of the COVID-19 pandemic.

== Honours ==
In the 1997 Queen's Birthday Honours, Peacock was appointed a Companion of the Order of Australia.

For his role in bringing in New Guinea independence, Peacock was appointed a Chief Grand Companion of the Order of Logohu in 2006.

In 2017, Peacock was awarded the Grand Cordon of the Order of the Rising Sun by the government of Japan, "for his contribution to strengthening and promoting friendly relations between Japan and Australia".

Parliament of Australia
Preceded by Robert Menzies	Member for Kooyong; 1966–1994	Succeeded by Petro Georgiou
Political offices
Preceded by Phillip Lynch	Minister for the Army; 1969–1972	Succeeded by Bob Katter Sr.
Preceded by Horace Nock as Minister without portfolio assisting the Prime Minister	Minister Assisting the Prime Minister; 1969–1971	Succeeded by Don Dobie as Assistant Minister assisting the Prime Minister
Preceded by Phillip Lynch	Minister Assisting the Treasurer; 1971–1972	Succeeded by Victor Garland
Preceded by Charles Barnes	Minister for External Territories; 1972	Succeeded by Gough Whitlam
New office	Opposition Spokesperson for Social Security and Welfare; 1973	Succeeded by Tony Street
New office	Opposition Spokesperson for Health; 1973	Succeeded by Tony Street
Preceded by Victor Garland	Opposition Spokesperson for Manufacturing Industry; 1973	Succeeded by Bob Cotton
Preceded by Nigel Bowen	Opposition Spokesperson for Foreign Affairs and External Territories; 1973–1975	Succeeded by Gough Whitlam as Opposition Spokesperson on Foreign Affairs
Preceded by Joe Berinson	Minister for Environment; 1975	Succeeded by Ivor Greenwood as Minister for Environment, Housing and Community Development
Preceded by Don Willesee	Minister for Foreign Affairs; 1975–1980	Succeeded by Tony Street
Preceded by Tony Street as Minister for Employment and Industrial Relations	Minister for Industrial Relations; 1980–1981	Succeeded by Ian Viner
Preceded by Phillip Lynch	Minister for Industry and Commerce; 1982–1983	Succeeded by John Button
Preceded by Bob Hawke	Leader of the Opposition of Australia; 1983–1985	Succeeded by John Howard
Preceded by Ian Macphee	Shadow Minister for Foreign Affairs; 1985–1987	Succeeded by Neil Brown
Preceded by Neil Brown	Deputy Leader of the Opposition of Australia; 1987–1989	Succeeded by Fred Chaney
Preceded by Jim Carlton	Shadow Treasurer of Australia; 1987–1989	Succeeded by John Hewson
Preceded by John Howard	Leader of the Opposition of Australia; 1989–1990	Succeeded by John Hewson
Preceded by Neil Brown	Shadow Minister for Justice; 1990–1992	Succeeded by Peter Durack
Preceded by Neil Brown	Shadow Attorney-General of Australia; 1990–1992	Succeeded by Peter Durack
Preceded by Alexander Downer as Shadow Minister for Trade and Trade Negotiations	Shadow Minister for Trade; 1992–1993	Succeeded by Tim Fischer
Preceded by Robert Hill	Shadow Minister for Foreign Affairs; 1993–1994	Succeeded by Peter Reith
Party political offices
Preceded by Malcolm Fraser	Leader of the Liberal Party of Australia; 1983–1985	Succeeded by John Howard
Preceded by Neil Brown	Deputy Leader of the Liberal Party of Australia; 1987–1989	Succeeded by Fred Chaney
Preceded by John Howard	Leader of the Liberal Party of Australia; 1989–1990	Succeeded by John Hewson
Diplomatic posts
Preceded by John McCarthy	Ambassador of Australia to the United States; 1997–1999	Succeeded by Michael Thawley
