= 1975 Liberal Party of Australia leadership spill =

Liberal Party of Australia leadership spill, 1975
- 21 March 1975
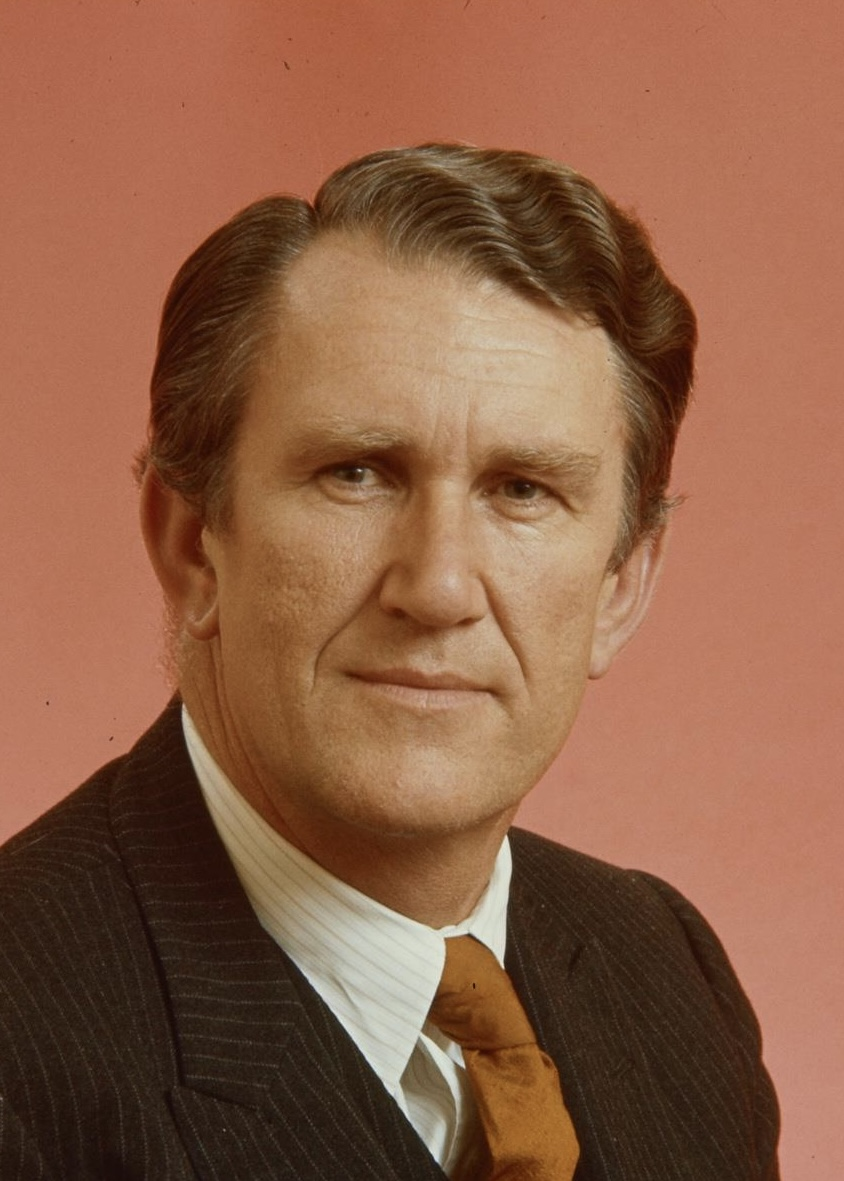

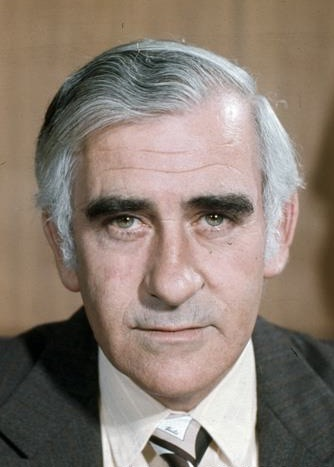
Candidate	Malcolm Fraser	Billy Snedden
Caucus vote	37	27
Percentage	57.8%	42.2%
Seat	Wannon (Vic.)	Bruce (Vic.)
Leader before election
Billy Snedden
Elected Leader
Malcolm Fraser

A spill of the leadership of the Liberal Party of Australia took place on 21 March 1975. It came about as a result of Malcolm Fraser's continued dissatisfaction with the party's direction under Billy Snedden. Fraser's challenge was successful – he defeated Snedden by 37 votes to 27, thus becoming Leader of the Opposition.

== Background ==
Snedden and Fraser both entered parliament at the 1955 federal election, and were soon being touted as future Liberal leaders. In 1971, both men were candidates for the deputy leadership vacated by John Gorton, with Snedden winning. After the party lost the 1972 election, both men were candidates to replace William McMahon as leader. Snedden won the leadership vote by a single vote over Nigel Bowen, with Fraser eliminated on the third ballot. In the new shadow ministry, Snedden made Fraser the spokesman for the primary industry, which was widely seen as a snub. (Note: Fraser had no previous ministerial experience in that portfolio, and was widely known for his expertise in defence, having been Minister for Defence from 1969 to 1971. Furthermore, primary industry was expected to be allocated to a member of the Country Party once in government, meaning Fraser would have to switch portfolios.)

=== Failed 1974 spill motion ===
After the Liberals lost the May 1974 election, dissatisfaction began to grow with Snedden's leadership. Later that year, Tony Staley began openly organising against Snedden, initially without Fraser's knowledge. On 26 November, a group of MPs confronted Snedden in his office and asked him to resign. He refused, but called a partyroom meeting the next day. Staley moved that the leadership be declared vacant, seconded by John Bourchier, but the motion was defeated. Fraser never formally announced himself as a candidate for the leadership.

=== Events of 1975 ===
On 30 January 1975, following continuing media speculation, Snedden met with Fraser and asked for a public declaration of loyalty. Fraser issued a statement that, although approved by Snedden, was widely seen as equivocating about his future plans. Over the following weeks, according to Paul Kelly, "a number of Fraser supporters established a solid and regular rapport with senior newspaper correspondents, and the psychology of crisis [...] afflicting the leadership was further exacerbated... the more it was written about, the more real it became". Opinion polling by The Bulletin in early March put Snedden's approval rating at 28 percent. On Friday, 14 March, Andrew Peacock – previously a Snedden supporter – publicly called for the leadership to be put to a vote. The following Monday, Snedden agreed to call a leadership ballot for Friday, 21 March. Fraser announced himself as a candidate on 18 March, and Andrew Peacock and James Killen announced their own candidacies the following day; both subsequently dropped out. Fraser eventually defeated Snedden by 37 votes to 27.

== Candidates ==
- Billy Snedden, incumbent Leader, Member for Bruce
- Malcolm Fraser, Shadow Minister for Labour, Member for Wannon

== Withdrawn candidates ==
- James Killen, Shadow Minister for Education, Member for Moreton
- Andrew Peacock, Shadow Minister for Foreign Affairs, External Territories, Member for Kooyong

== Results ==
The following table gives the ballot result:

=== Leadership ballot ===
Name	Votes	Percentage
Malcolm Fraser	37	57.8
Billy Snedden	27	42.2
