= Billy Snedden =

Australian politician (1926–1987)

The Right Honourable Sir Billy Snedden KCMG QC
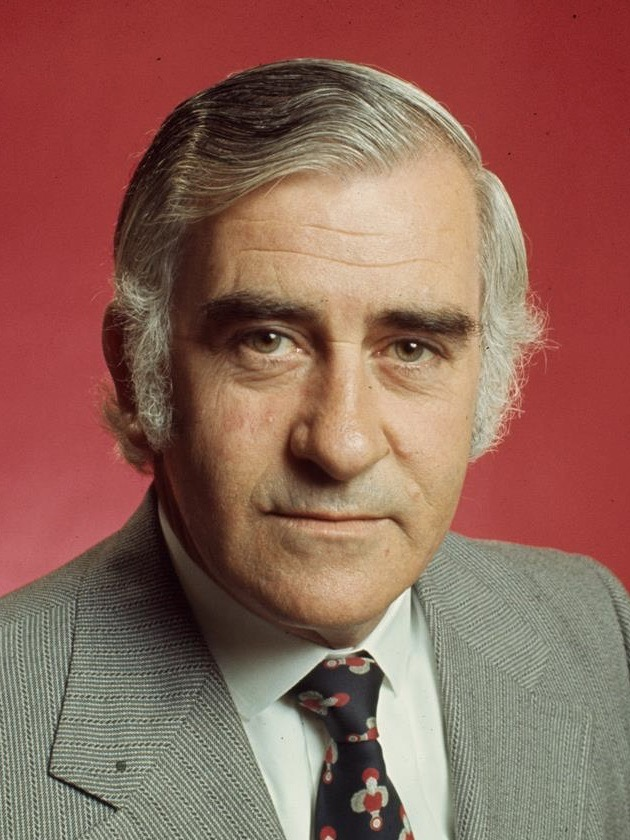
- Official portrait, 1973

Leader of the Opposition
- In office 20 December 1972 – 21 March 1975
- Prime Minister: Gough Whitlam
- Deputy: Phillip Lynch
- Preceded by: Gough Whitlam
- Succeeded by: Malcolm Fraser

Speaker of the House of Representatives
- In office 17 February 1976 – 4 February 1983
- Preceded by: Gordon Scholes
- Succeeded by: Harry Jenkins Sr.
Party leadership positions
Leader of the Liberal Party
In office 20 December 1972 – 21 March 1975
Deputy	Phillip Lynch
Preceded by	William McMahon
Succeeded by	Malcolm Fraser
Deputy Leader of the Liberal Party
In office 18 August 1971 – 20 December 1972
Leader	William McMahon
Preceded by	John Gorton
Succeeded by	Phillip Lynch
Ministerial offices
Treasurer of Australia
In office 22 March 1971 – 4 December 1972
Prime Minister	William McMahon
Preceded by	Leslie Bury
Succeeded by	Gough Whitlam
Minister for Labour and National Service
In office 12 November 1969 – 22 March 1971
Prime Minister	John Gorton; William McMahon
Preceded by	Les Bury
Succeeded by	Phillip Lynch
Leader of the House
In office 12 November 1969 – 10 March 1971
Leader	John Gorton
Preceded by	Dudley Erwin
Succeeded by	Reginald Swartz
In office 13 February 1967 – 13 February 1969
Leader	Harold Holt; John Gorton
Preceded by	David Fairbairn
Succeeded by	Dudley Erwin
Minister for Immigration
In office 14 December 1966 – 12 November 1969
Prime Minister	Harold Holt; John McEwen; John Gorton
Preceded by	Hubert Opperman
Succeeded by	Phillip Lynch
Attorney-General
In office 4 March 1964 – 14 December 1966
Prime Minister	Robert Menzies; Harold Holt
Preceded by	Garfield Barwick
Succeeded by	Nigel Bowen
Constituency
Member of the Australian Parliament for Bruce
In office 10 December 1955 – 21 April 1983
Preceded by	Constituency established
Succeeded by	Ken Aldred

Personal details
- Born: Billy Mackie Snedden; 31 December 1926 West Perth, Western Australia, Australia
- Died: 27 June 1987 (aged 60) Rushcutters Bay, New South Wales, Australia
- Party: Liberal
- Spouse: Joy Forsyth (m. 1950)
- Children: Four
- Education: Highgate State School; Perth Boys' School; Perth Technical College; University of Western Australia
- Occupation: Commercial lawyer Public servant Politician

Sir Billy Mackie Snedden (31 December 1926 – 27 June 1987) was an Australian politician who served as the leader of the Liberal Party from 1972 to 1975. He was also a cabinet minister from 1964 to 1972, and Speaker of the House of Representatives from 1976 to 1983.

Snedden was born in Perth, Western Australia. He served in the Royal Australian Air Force during World War II, and then studied law at the University of Western Australia. From 1951 to 1952, he was the inaugural federal chairman of the Young Liberal Movement. After a period working overseas for the Department of Immigration, Snedden returned to Australia in 1954 and settled in Melbourne. He was elected to the House of Representatives the following year, aged 28.

In 1964, Snedden was elevated to cabinet by Robert Menzies. He served as a government minister until the Liberal government's defeat at the 1972 election, under an additional four prime ministers. Snedden spent periods as Attorney-General (1964–1966), Minister for Immigration (1966–1969), Minister for Labour and National Service (1969–1971), and Treasurer (1971–1972). He was elected deputy leader of the Liberal Party in 1971, and replaced William McMahon as leader after the following year's election loss, thus becoming Leader of the Opposition.

Snedden led the Liberal Party to the 1974 federal election, which saw the Labor Party retain government with a narrow majority. Malcolm Fraser mounted two leadership challenges in early 1975, winning on the second attempt; by the end of the year he was prime minister. Snedden was elected to the speakership when the parliament next sat. He held the position for almost seven years, gaining a reputation for impartiality. In retirement, Snedden served as chairman of the Melbourne Football Club and on the board of the Victorian Football League. The unusual circumstances of his death in 1987, which involved the ex-girlfriend of his own son, attracted much public interest.

== Early life ==
=== Birth and family background ===
Snedden was born on 31 December 1926 at a private hospital in Newcastle Street, West Perth, Western Australia. He was the youngest of six children born to Catherine (née Mackie) and Alan Snedden. His mother was 43 years old when he was born, and his siblings, one sister and four brothers, were much older than him. (Note: His sister was 21 years older and his youngest brother was eight years older.)

Snedden's parents were born in Alva, Clackmannanshire, Scotland, and spoke "broad Scots". His grandparents were illiterate, and his parents had only limited schooling; they were both from coal-mining families. They immigrated to Australia in 1912 with their three oldest children, initially settling in the remote mining town of Meekatharra. The family moved to Perth in about 1921, after their house in Meekatharra burned down.

Snedden's father worked mostly as a stonemason, but also spent periods as a miner and general labourer when better work was not available. He reputedly left Scotland to escape a paternity suit, and had earlier been in trouble with the law for poaching. The family name was originally "Snaddon" (or "Snadon"), but was changed upon arrival in Australia.

=== Childhood ===
Snedden grew up in Perth's inner north near the suburb of Highgate, living initially on Robinson Avenue and later on Bulwer Street. His father left home when he was about three or four years old, and they had only limited contact thereafter. His oldest brother Bob became the family's main breadwinner, while his mother worked as a laundress and his other siblings also found jobs. He was close to his sister Jean, who often babysat him. Snedden worked part-time from about the age of eight, helping his brothers on construction sites and selling and delivering newspapers. He began his schooling at Highgate Primary School, and later attended the Perth Boys' School through to the ninth grade.

Snedden left school in April 1942 and began working as a junior law clerk for Thomas Hughes, who was a solicitor and independent state MP. He would not normally have been considered qualified for the job, but there was a shortage of applicants due to the war. Snedden was eventually able to receive his leaving certificate by attending night school at Perth Technical College. He fell out with Hughes late in 1943, and in January 1944 began working as a clerk at the Commonwealth Crown Solicitor's office. He was a talented sportsman as a youth, and played a few games for the West Perth Football Club during the 1944 WANFL season, at a time when the competition was age-restricted. He later represented Western Australia at the Australian Amateur Football Carnival in Melbourne in 1951.

=== Military service and university ===
Snedden and two friends attempted to join the merchant navy at the age of 15, but were unsuccessful. He also attempted to join the Royal Australian Navy when he was 17, but his mother refused her permission; three of his brothers were already on active service. Snedden eventually enlisted in the Royal Australian Air Force (RAAF) in January 1945, two days after his 18th birthday. He began an air crew training scheme, but as the war came to an end he was taken off the course and given more general duties; this included a period tending bar at an officers' mess. He was discharged in September 1945.

As part of his demobilisation, Snedden completed aptitude tests which showed he would be a suitable candidate for a university education. In combination with his earlier clerking experience, this allowed him to secure a place at the University of Western Australia's law school in 1946. Snedden failed two subjects in his first year, and was only able to continue when the law school dean Frank Beasley intervened on his behalf. He graduated with a Bachelor of Laws in 1950, and completed his articles of clerkship with Harvey, Slattery, and Gibson. He was called to the bar in December 1951.

== Professional career ==
In 1951, Snedden briefly returned to the Commonwealth Crown Solicitor's office. He resigned from the public service due to a pay cut, and began working for Angus & Coote as a hearing aid salesman. In early 1952, he secured a position as a migration officer with the Department of Immigration. He and his family moved to Italy for sixteen months, initially living in Taormina, Sicily, and later in Rome. He learnt to speak Italian, and travelled around the country conducting interviews with prospective migrants. In November 1953, Snedden was transferred to England. He stayed there for a year, and was then supposed to be moved on to Germany. However, he decided to return to Australia, and in January 1955 moved to Melbourne to work in a legal advice bureau for ex-servicemen. He and his family settled in Ringwood.

== Political career ==
=== Early involvement ===
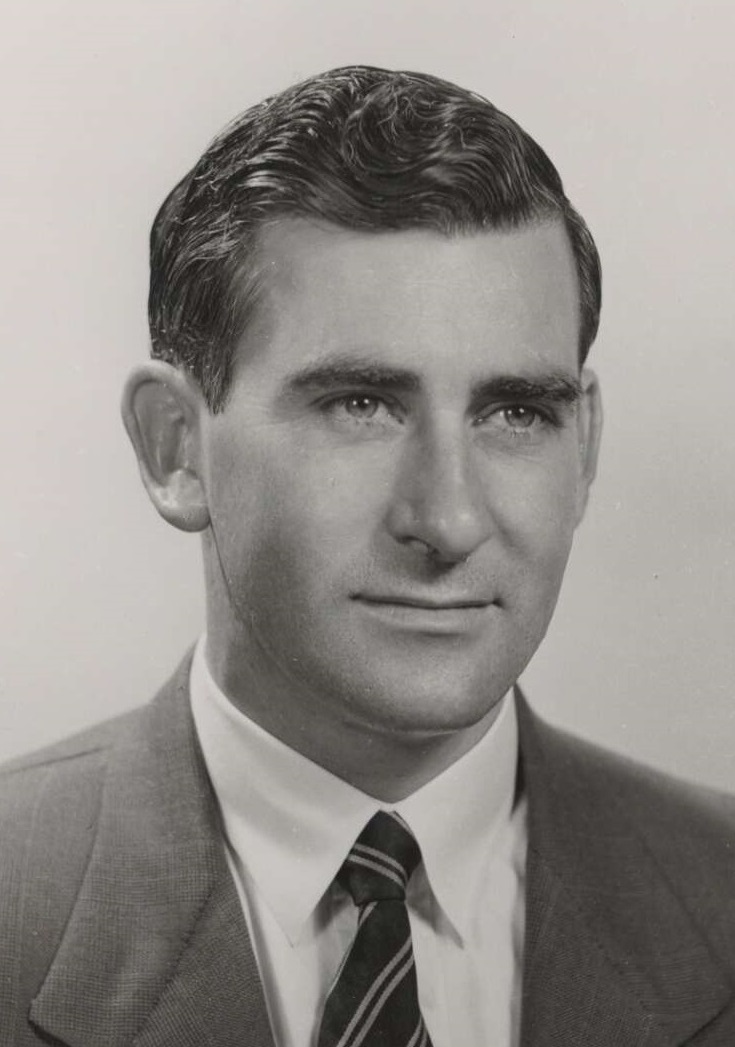
Snedden c. 1955

Snedden was state president of the Young Liberals, and from 1951 to 1952 served as the inaugural federal chairman of the organisation. As president of the UWA Liberal Club, he became acquainted with future prime minister Bob Hawke, who was president of the Labor Club. As a student, he made three unsuccessful attempts to enter politics, standing for the Liberal Party at the 1948 Boulder state by-election and at the 1949 and 1951 federal elections (in Fremantle and Perth, respectively).

=== Member of Parliament ===
In 1954 Snedden moved to Melbourne, where he practised law until 1955, when he was elected to the House of Representatives for the outer suburban seat of Bruce. He defeated Keith Ewert, the former Labor member for nearby Flinders. Snedden defeated Ewert by a similar margin in 1958.

In 1961, Snedden faced Ewert again, and this time trailed in initial counting. However, he was elected on Democratic Labor Party preferences. Snedden's narrow win was critical in the outcome of what was the closest election in Australian history up till that time. Had Labor won it, it would have toppled the Coalition after 12 years of rule. However, with Snedden's win, the best Labor could hope for was a hung parliament, though the Coalition was not assured of another term in government until later in the night, with its narrow victory in Moreton.

=== Cabinet ===
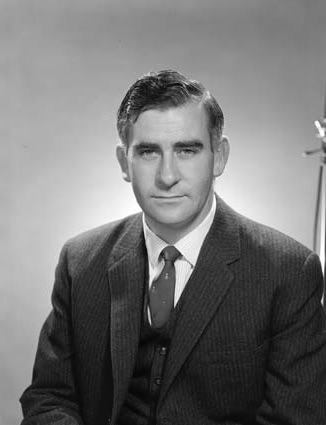
Snedden in 1961

He served in the ministries of Sir Robert Menzies, Harold Holt, John McEwen, John Gorton and William McMahon. In March 1964 Menzies appointed him Attorney-General. In that capacity he played a significant role in the 1967 constitutional referendum affecting the status of Aboriginals. On 7 April 1965, the Menzies Cabinet decided that it would seek to repeal Section 127 of the Constitution, which excluded indigenous people from the population count, but made no firm plans or timetable for such action. In August 1965, Snedden proposed to Cabinet that abolition of Section 127 was inappropriate unless Section 51(xxvi) was simultaneously amended to remove the words "other than the aboriginal race in any state". He was rebuffed, but he gained agreement when he made a similar submission to the Holt Cabinet in 1966. The referendum went ahead on 27 May 1967, and was resoundingly approved.

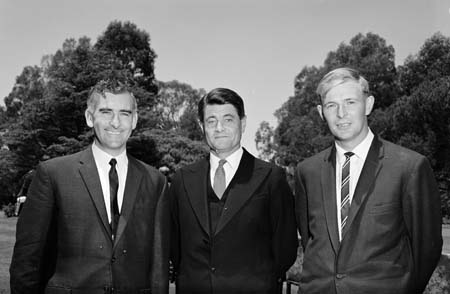
Snedden with Jim Forbes and Doug Anthony in 1963

He was Minister for Immigration 1966–1969, and Minister for Labour and National Service 1969–1971, a difficult job which put him in charge of the government's highly unpopular policy of conscription for the Vietnam War. In 1967, following the death of Harold Holt, he was a candidate for the leadership of the Liberal Party, but his candidacy was not taken very seriously.

As Minister for Labour and National Service, Snedden commented on anti-war and anti-conscription activists' demonstrations. On the eve of the first Moratorium, he said in Parliament that the marchers were "political bikies pack-raping democracy". In 1971, Snedden was appointed Treasurer by William McMahon, and was elected Liberal Deputy Leader, making him the heir apparent to the leadership.

=== Leader of the Opposition ===
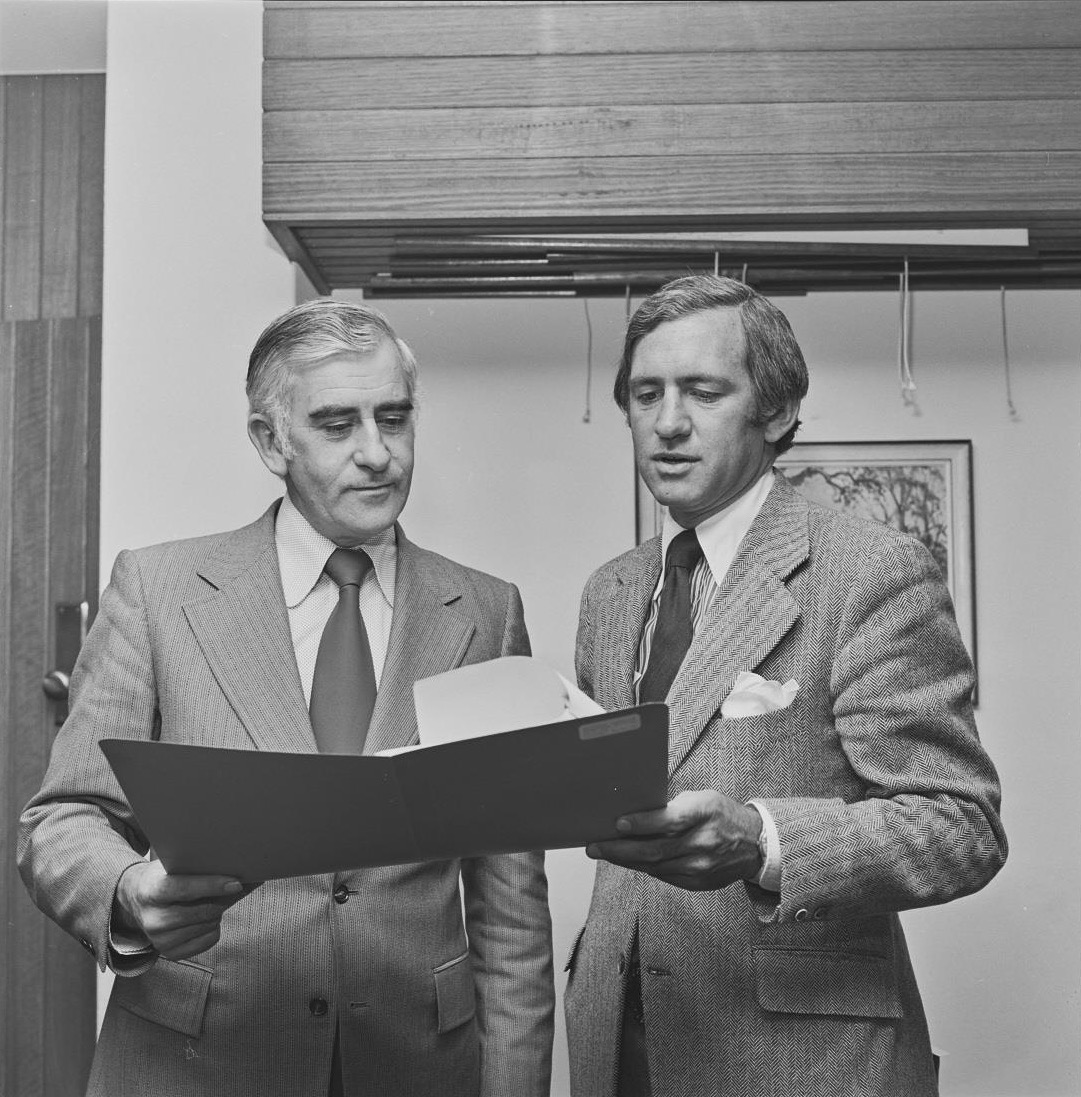
Snedden with Andrew Peacock on 12 October 1973

When McMahon was defeated by the Labor Party under Gough Whitlam in 1972, Snedden was elected as his replacement as Liberal leader, winning by a single vote over Nigel Bowen on the fifth ballot. Snedden promised a new and more "liberal" Liberal Party, but he suffered from his continuing image as a light-weight, and many Liberals believed he would never defeat Whitlam.

Snedden allowed himself to be persuaded to use the conservative majority in the Senate to block the Whitlam government's budget in 1974. Whitlam promptly called a double dissolution election for 18 May, at which he was returned to office, albeit with a reduced majority. Labor campaigned on the slogan "Oh no, not Snedden!". Snedden exposed himself to ridicule by refusing to concede defeat, saying at a press conference: "We were not defeated. We did not win enough seats in order to form a government".

After the election the conservative wing of the Liberal Party, led by Malcolm Fraser, challenged Snedden's leadership, but he was narrowly re-elected. When he failed to make any headway against Whitlam, Fraser mounted a second challenge, and Snedden was deposed in March 1975, becoming the first leader of the Liberal Party not to gain the prime ministership. He retired to the backbench until February 1976, when Fraser supported his election as Speaker of the House.

=== Speaker of the House ===
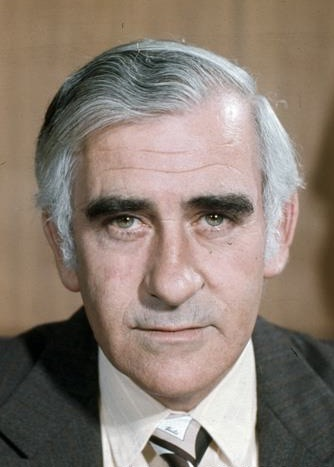
Snedden in February 1975.

Snedden was elected Speaker of the House of Representatives on 17 February 1976, defeating the previous speaker, Gordon Scholes, by a majority of 53 votes. He was re-elected on 21 February 1978, defeating Labor MP Dr Harry Jenkins by a majority of 44 votes, and on 25 November 1980, again defeating Dr Jenkins by a majority of 22 votes.

He was the last speaker of the House of Representatives to wear the formal regalia of full-bottomed wig and gown inherited from the House of Commons of the United Kingdom, believing that it would restore the dignity of the office of speaker.

As speaker, Snedden sought to enhance the role and assert its independence. He preferred the speaker to be recognised as an impartial umpire like the speaker of the House of Commons. In 1979, he published a paper outlining his proposals for adopting some of the Westminster conventions, namely that the speaker remain in office for five to seven years then resign and hold no further public office, that the speaker be unopposed by the major political parties at general elections, and that the speaker resign from his or her party upon becoming speaker.

Snedden tried to strengthen the Parliament's ability to withstand pressures from the Executive. He believed that it was contrary to Parliament's independence for the Executive to control the funds allocated to Parliament, so he authorised parliamentary officers to write a paper in 1976 entitled The Parliamentary Budget. He later wrote, "You could not have a situation where the Executive decided the level at which Members could operate efficiently." This led to the introduction of the Appropriation (Parliamentary Departments) Bill in 1982.

One of his most memorable actions as speaker occurred in February 1982, when a Labor frontbencher, Bob Hawke, referred to then Prime Minister, Malcolm Fraser, as a "liar" during question time. Fraser was answering a question about two joint royal commissions being conducted in Victoria at the time. Fraser allegedly selectively quoted a statement by the Victorian Leader of the Opposition, John Cain, which provoked Hawke to call Fraser a liar. Snedden followed parliamentary procedure and asked Hawke to withdraw the remark. When Hawke refused, Snedden named him and a motion for his suspension was moved. Snedden later wrote: "It was his [Fraser's] instigation which was making the Parliament unworkable, not the Opposition's response, like the classroom situation where the smart little man hits the fellow next to him who retaliates and is seen by the teacher". Members of the Opposition had by that point taken up "liar" as a chant, which put Snedden in the position where he would have to name every member, one by one. After realising that the House would be unworkable for that sitting day, he declined to put the motion for Hawke's suspension.

Fraser was furious and attempted to intimidate Snedden into punishing Hawke for not withdrawing or take his "punishment". Snedden refused and was convinced that he would be replaced as speaker but, once Fraser realised that he had no support in the Liberal Party to remove Snedden from office, he sent a conciliatory message.

With the defeat of the Fraser government in 1983 and the election of Dr Harry Jenkins Sr. as speaker, Snedden resigned from Parliament on 21 April 1983. In doing so, he honoured a feature of his 1979 paper. He believed that if he stayed in Parliament, he might be called on for advice on his successor's rulings, which would be undesirable because it would undermine the chair. He said, "I am very conscious that, under the Westminster convention, when the Speaker leaves the chair he leaves the House. I think this is right." He formally resigned from Parliament later that day.

== Later life ==
When the Fraser government was defeated by Hawke in 1983, Snedden immediately resigned from Parliament after 28 years of service. He separated from his wife, Lady Snedden, and was later to withdraw from public life as his health declined from atherosclerosis and heart disease. Snedden was chairman of the Melbourne Football Club from 1981 to 1986, later a director of the Victorian Football League and also patron of the Professional Boxing Association of Australia.

=== Death ===
On the night of 27 June 1987, just hours after attending a Liberal Party campaign event in Sydney with John Howard during the 1987 federal election, Snedden suffered a fatal heart attack at the Travelodge motel in Rushcutters Bay, while having sex with an ex-girlfriend of his son Drew, identified only as "Wendy". Melbourne newspaper The Truth headlined its report "Snedden died on the job", while the Sydney Morning Herald reported that Snedden was wearing a condom and that "it was loaded".

== Personal life ==
Snedden married Joy Forsyth, a dental nurse, on 10 March 1950. They were separated but not divorced at the time of his death. They had two sons and two daughters together. His daughter Fiona was elected to the Melbourne City Council in 2004 after an unsuccessful candidature for the Liberal Party in the seat of Melbourne Ports in the 1998 federal election. She stood for re-election to council in 2008 but lost her seat.

== Honours ==
Snedden was appointed a Knight Commander of the Order of St Michael and St George (KCMG) in January 1978. He was appointed a Privy Councillor in 1972.

On 24 April 1980, Snedden officially opened a large recreational centre purpose-built for adults and children with a disability. Commissioned by the Spastic Society of Victoria (now Scope), the "Knox Spastic Centre" was the largest of its kind in Victoria with progressive facilities including in-house specialists, community services and a wheelchair-accessible pool.

== Notes ==
Parliament of Australia
New division	Member for Bruce; 1955–1983	Succeeded by Ken Aldred
Preceded by Gordon Scholes	Speaker of the Australian House of Representatives; 1976–1983	Succeeded by Harry Jenkins Sr.
Political offices
Preceded by Garfield Barwick	Attorney-General of Australia; 1964–1966	Succeeded by Nigel Bowen
Preceded by Hubert Opperman	Minister for Immigration; 1966–1969	Succeeded by Phillip Lynch
Preceded by Les Bury	Minister for Labour and National Service; 1969–1971	Succeeded by Phillip Lynch
Preceded by Les Bury	Treasurer of Australia; 1971–1972	Succeeded by Gough Whitlam
Preceded by Gough Whitlam	Leader of the Opposition of Australia; 1972–1975	Succeeded by Malcolm Fraser
New office	Opposition Spokesperson on the Economy; 1973	Succeeded by Phillip Lynch
New office	Opposition Spokesperson for Electoral Matters; 1973	Succeeded by Reg Withers
Party political offices
Preceded by David Fairbairn	Leader of the House; 1966–1969	Succeeded by Dudley Erwin
Preceded by Dudley Erwin	Leader of the House; 1969–1971	Succeeded by Reginald Swartz
Preceded by John Gorton	Deputy Leader of the Liberal Party of Australia; 1971–1972	Succeeded by Phillip Lynch
Preceded by William McMahon	Leader of the Liberal Party of Australia; 1972–1975	Succeeded by Malcolm Fraser
Sporting positions
Preceded by Wayne Reid	Chairman of the Melbourne Football Club; 1981–1986	Succeeded by Stuart Spencer
