= 1972 Liberal Party of Australia leadership election =

Australian political party leadership election

- 20 December 1972
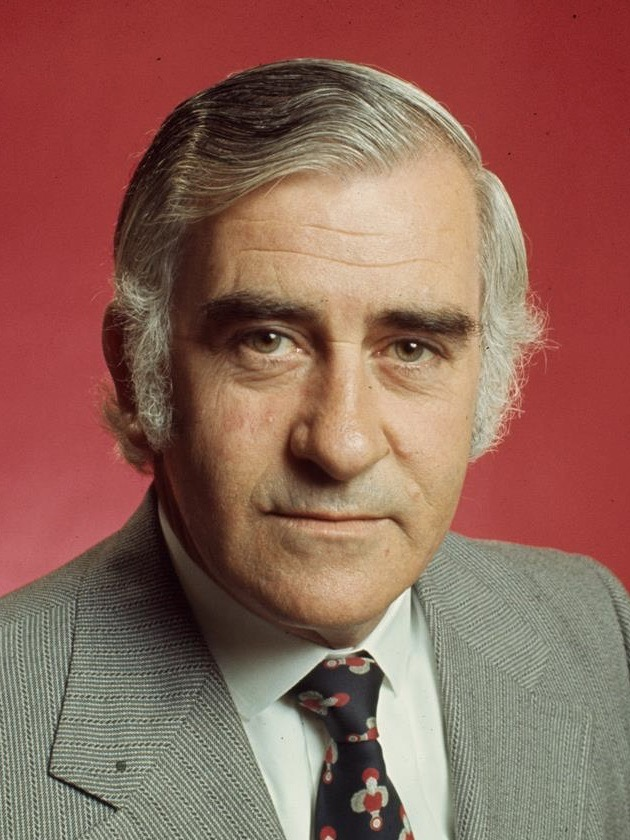

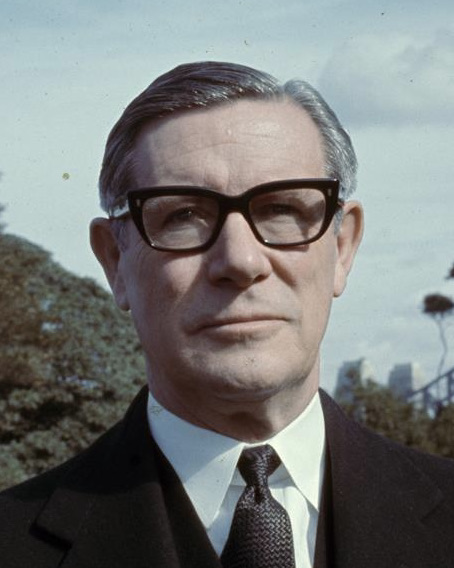

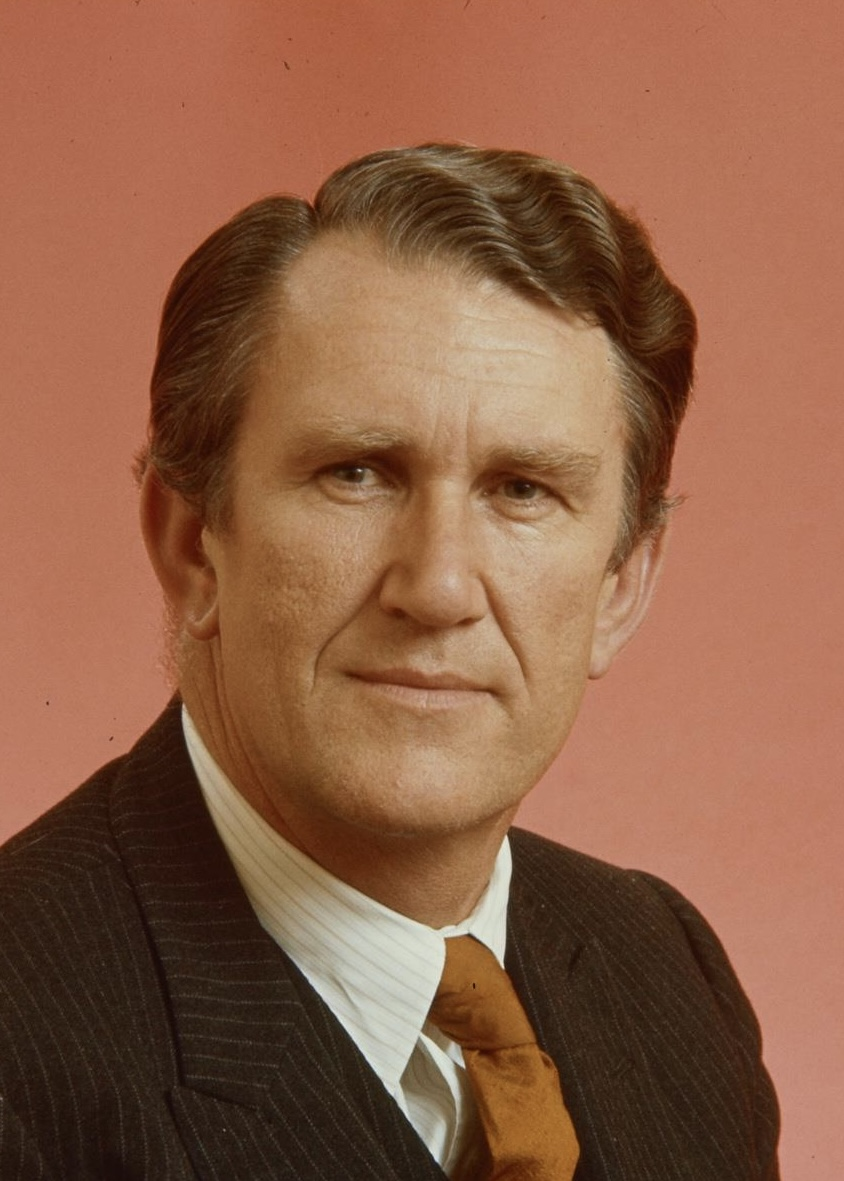

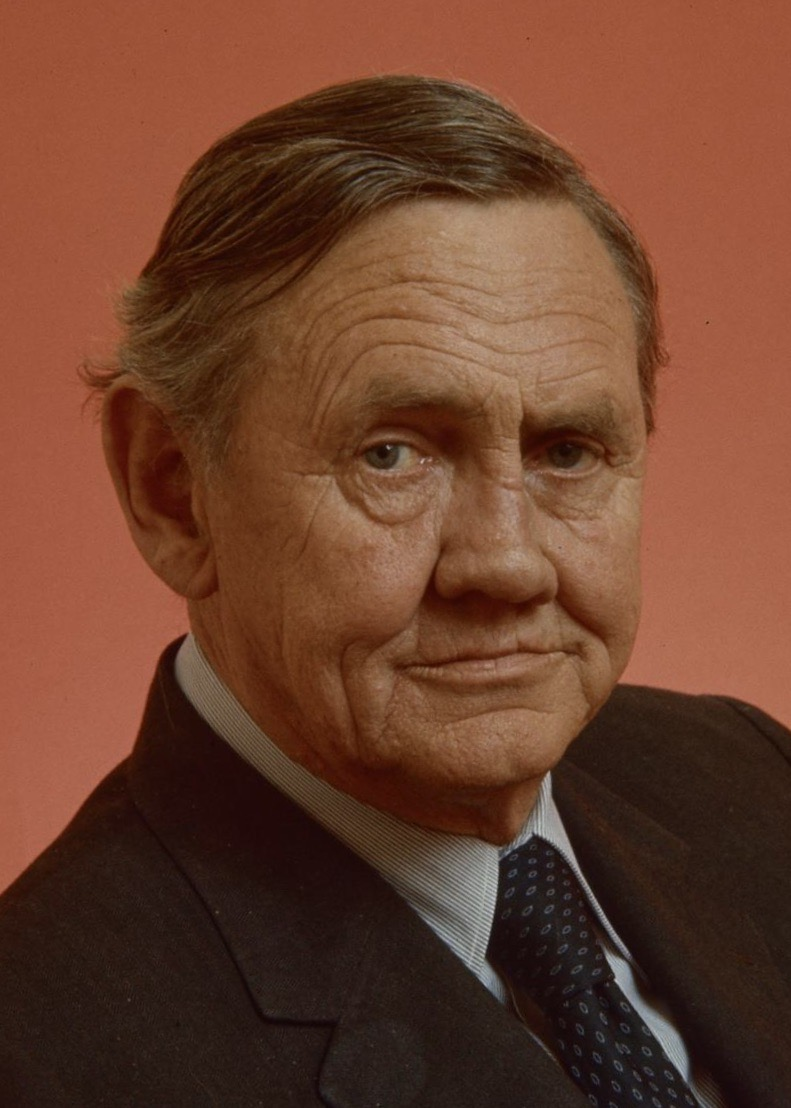

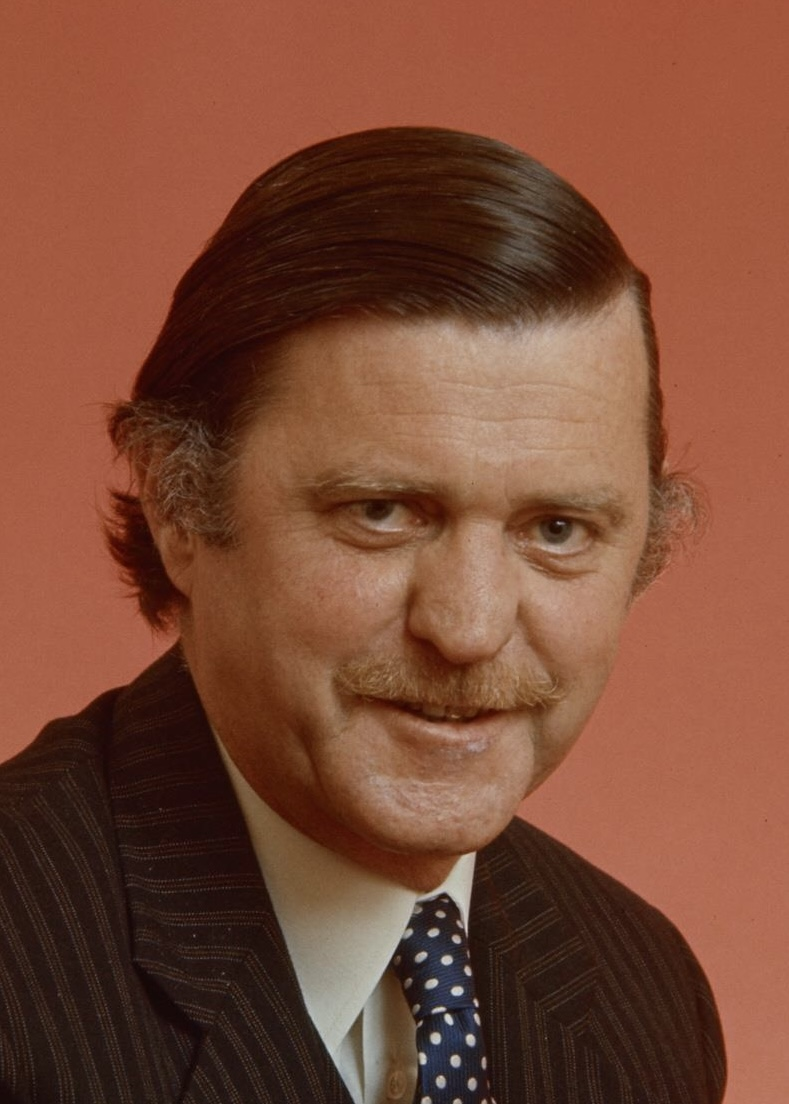
Candidate	Billy Snedden	Nigel Bowen	Malcolm Fraser
First Ballot	Uncertain	Uncertain	Uncertain
Second Ballot	Uncertain	Uncertain	Uncertain
Third Ballot	Uncertain	Uncertain	Uncertain
Fourth Ballot	29 (50.0%)	29 (50.0%)	Eliminated
Fifth Ballot	30 (50.9%)	29 (49.1%)	Eliminated
Seat	Bruce (Vic.)	Parramatta (NSW)	Wannon (Vic.)
Candidate	John Gorton	James Killen
First Ballot	Uncertain	Uncertain
Second Ballot	Uncertain	Eliminated
Third Ballot	Eliminated	Eliminated
Fourth Ballot	Eliminated	Eliminated
Fifth Ballot	Eliminated	Eliminated
Seat	Higgins (Vic.)	Moreton (Qld.)
Leader before election
William McMahon
Elected Leader
Billy Snedden

An election for the leadership of the Liberal Party of Australia took place on 20 December 1972, following former prime minister William McMahon's resignation after his defeat at the 1972 federal election. Billy Snedden was successful in winning the leadership, narrowly beating Nigel Bowen by 30 votes to 29 on the fifth ballot. The previous ballot was tied at 29 each, with one MP not voting. James Killen, John Gorton, and Malcolm Fraser had earlier been eliminated from contention, in that order.

== Candidates ==
- Nigel Bowen, former minister for foreign affairs, member for Parramatta
- Malcolm Fraser, former minister for education and science, member for Wannon
- John Gorton, former Leader and prime minister, member for Higgins
- James Killen, former minister for the Navy, member for Moreton
- Billy Snedden, incumbent deputy leader and former treasurer, member for Bruce

== Results ==
Liberal Party of Australia deputy leadership ballot, 1972

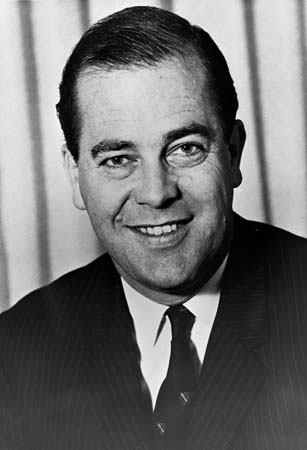

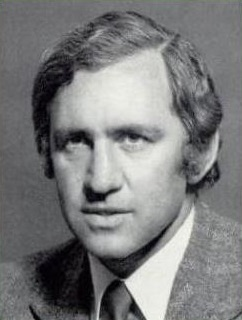
Candidate	Phillip Lynch	Andrew Peacock
Fifth Ballot	>30	<29
Seat	Flinders (Vic.)	Kooyong (Vic.)
Deputy Leader before election
Billy Snedden
Elected Deputy Leader
Phillip Lynch

The following table gives the ballot result:

=== Leadership ballot ===
Name	Final ballot	Percentage
Billy Snedden	30	50.85
Nigel Bowen	29	49.15

=== Deputy leadership ballot ===
Name	Final ballot	Percentage
Phillip Lynch	<30	
Andrew Peacock	>29	

Other candidates in order of elimination:

- Malcolm Fraser
- Jim Forbes
- Don Chipp
- James Killen
