= Malcolm Fraser =

Prime Minister of Australia from 1975 to 1983

The Right Honourable Malcolm Fraser AC CH GCL
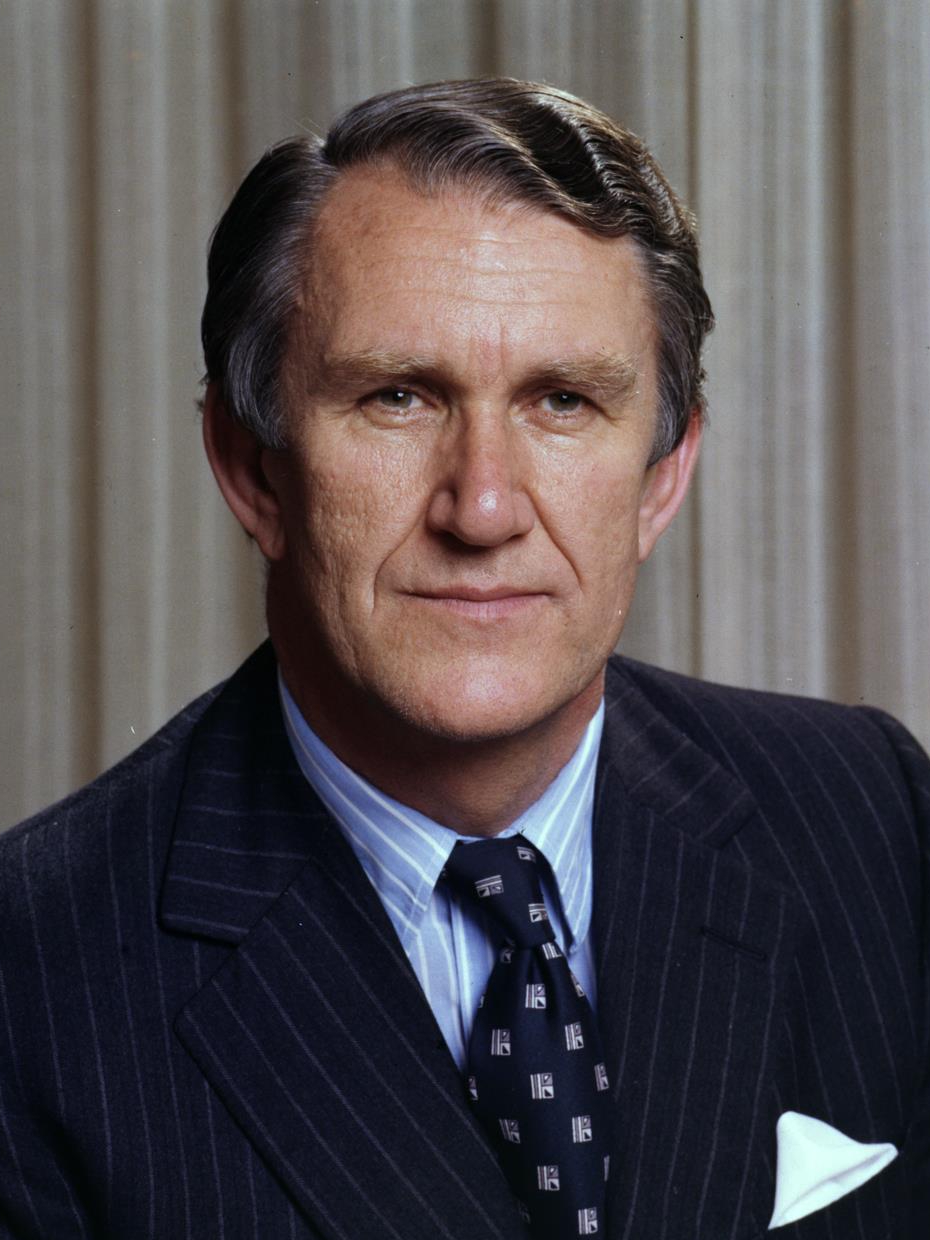
- Studio portrait, 1977

22nd Prime Minister of Australia
- In office 11 November 1975 – 11 March 1983
- Monarch: Elizabeth II
- Governors-General: John Kerr; Zelman Cowen; Ninian Stephen
- Deputy: Doug Anthony
- Preceded by: Gough Whitlam
- Succeeded by: Bob Hawke

6th Leader of the Liberal Party
- In office 21 March 1975 – 11 March 1983
- Deputy: Phillip Lynch; John Howard
- Preceded by: Billy Snedden
- Succeeded by: Andrew Peacock

Leader of the Opposition
- In office 21 March 1975 – 11 November 1975
- Prime Minister: Gough Whitlam
- Deputy: Phillip Lynch
- Preceded by: Billy Snedden
- Succeeded by: Gough Whitlam

Minister for Education and Science
- In office 20 August 1971 – 5 December 1972
- Prime Minister: William McMahon
- Preceded by: David Fairbairn
- Succeeded by: Gough Whitlam
- In office 28 February 1968 – 12 November 1969
- Prime Minister: John Gorton
- Preceded by: John Gorton
- Succeeded by: Nigel Bowen

Minister for Defence
- In office 12 November 1969 – 8 March 1971
- Prime Minister: John Gorton
- Preceded by: Allen Fairhall
- Succeeded by: John Gorton

Minister for the Army
- In office 26 January 1966 – 28 February 1968
- Prime Minister: Harold Holt; John McEwen; John Gorton
- Preceded by: Jim Forbes
- Succeeded by: Phillip Lynch

Father of the House
- In role 5 January 1982 – 31 March 1983
- Preceded by: William McMahon
- Succeeded by: James Killen

Member of the Australian Parliament for Wannon
- In office 10 December 1955 – 31 March 1983
- Preceded by: Don McLeod
- Succeeded by: David Hawker

Personal details
- Born: John Malcolm Fraser; 21 May 1930 Melbourne, Victoria, Australia
- Died: 20 March 2015 (aged 84) Melbourne, Victoria, Australia
- Resting place: Melbourne General Cemetery
- Party: Liberal (until 2010)
- Spouse: Tamara "Tamie" Beggs (m. 1956)
- Children: 4
- Parent: Neville Fraser (father)
- Relatives: Simon Fraser Sr. (grandfather); Simon Fraser Jr. (uncle)
- Education: Magdalen College, Oxford
- Occupation: Farmer; politician

John Malcolm Fraser (/ˈfreɪzə/; 21 May 1930 – 20 March 2015) was the 22nd prime minister of Australia, serving from 1975 to 1983. He held office as the leader of the Liberal Party of Australia, and is the fourth longest-serving prime minister in Australian history.

Born in Melbourne, Fraser was raised on his father's sheep stations in rural New South Wales and studied philosophy, politics and economics at Magdalen College, Oxford. After an initial defeat in 1954, he was elected to the House of Representatives at the 1955 federal election, winning the rural south-western Victoria seat of Wannon. At 25 years old, he was one of the youngest people ever elected to Parliament. He is the latest prime minister as of 2025 to represent a rural constituency. When Harold Holt became prime minister in 1966, Fraser was appointed Minister for the Army. After Holt's disappearance and replacement by John Gorton, Fraser became Minister for Education and Science (1968–1969) and then Minister for Defence (1969–1971). In 1971, Fraser resigned from cabinet and denounced Gorton as "unfit to hold the great office of prime minister"; this precipitated the replacement of Gorton with William McMahon. He subsequently returned to his old education and science portfolio.

After the Liberal–National Coalition was defeated at the 1972 election, Fraser unsuccessfully stood for the Liberal leadership, losing to Billy Snedden. When the party lost the 1974 election, he began to move against Snedden, eventually mounting a successful challenge in March 1975. As Leader of the Opposition, Fraser used the Coalition's control of the Australian Senate to block supply to the Whitlam government, precipitating the 1975 Australian constitutional crisis. This culminated with Gough Whitlam being dismissed as prime minister by the governor-general, Sir John Kerr, a unique occurrence in Australian history. The correctness of Fraser's actions in the crisis and the exact nature of his involvement in Kerr's decision have since been a topic of debate. Fraser remains the only Australian prime minister to ascend to the position upon the dismissal of his predecessor.

After Whitlam's dismissal, Fraser was sworn in as prime minister on an initial caretaker basis. The Coalition won a landslide victory at the 1975 election, and was re-elected in 1977 and 1980. Fraser took a keen interest in foreign affairs as prime minister, and was more active in the international sphere than many of his predecessors. He was a strong supporter of multiculturalism, and during his term in office Australia admitted significant numbers of non-white immigrants (including Vietnamese boat people) for the first time, effectively ending the White Australia policy. His government also established the Special Broadcasting Service (SBS). Particularly in his final years in office, Fraser came into conflict with the "dry" economic rationalist and fiscal conservative faction of his party. His government made few major changes to economic policy.

After losing the 1983 election, Fraser retired from politics. In his post-political career, he held advisory positions with the United Nations (UN) and the Commonwealth of Nations, and was president of the aid agency CARE from 1990 to 1995. He resigned his membership of the Liberal Party in 2009 after the election of Tony Abbott as leader, Fraser having been a critic of the Liberals’ policy direction for a number of years. Evaluations of Fraser's prime ministership have been mixed. He is generally credited with restoring stability to the country after a series of short-term leaders and has been praised for his commitment to multiculturalism and opposition to apartheid in South Africa, but the circumstances of his entry to office remains controversial and many have viewed his government as a lost opportunity for economic reform. He was the last Australian prime minister entitled to the style "the Right Honourable" as a member of the Privy Council of the United Kingdom. His seven and a half-year tenure as prime minister is the fourth-longest in Australian history, only surpassed by Bob Hawke, John Howard and Robert Menzies.

== Early life ==
=== Birth and family background ===
John Malcolm Fraser was born in Toorak, Melbourne, Victoria, on 21 May 1930. He was the second of two children born to Una Arnold (née Woolf) and John Neville Fraser; his older sister Lorraine had been born in 1928. Both he and his father were known exclusively by their middle names. His paternal grandfather, Sir Simon Fraser, was born in Nova Scotia, Canada, and arrived in Australia in 1853. He made his fortune as a railway contractor, and later acquired significant pastoral holdings, becoming a member of the "squattocracy". Fraser's maternal grandfather, Louis Woolf, was born in Dunedin, New Zealand, and arrived in Australia as a child. He was of Jewish origin, a fact which his grandson did not learn until he was an adult. A chartered accountant by trade, he married Amy Booth, who was related to the wealthy Hordern family of Sydney and was a first cousin of Sir Samuel Hordern.

Fraser had a political background on both sides of his family. His father served on the Wakool Shire Council, including as president for two years, and was an admirer of Billy Hughes and a friend of Richard Casey. Simon Fraser served in both houses of the colonial Parliament of Victoria, and represented Victoria at several of the constitutional conventions of the 1890s. He eventually become one of the inaugural members of the new federal Senate, serving from 1901 to 1913 as a member of the early conservative parties. Louis Woolf also stood for the Senate in 1901, standing as a Free Trader in Western Australia. He polled only 400 votes across the whole state, and was never again a candidate for public office.

=== Childhood ===
Fraser spent most of his early life at Balpool-Nyang, a sheep station of 15,000 hectares (37,000 acres) on the Edward River near Moulamein, New South Wales. His father had a law degree from Magdalen College, Oxford, but never practised law and preferred the life of a grazier. Fraser contracted a severe case of pneumonia when he was eight years old, which nearly proved fatal. He was home-schooled until the age of ten, when he was sent to board at Tudor House School in the Southern Highlands. He attended Tudor House from 1940 to 1943, and then completed his secondary education at Melbourne Grammar School from 1944 to 1948 where he was a member of Rusden House. While at Melbourne Grammar, he lived in a flat that his parents owned on Collins Street. In 1943, Fraser's father sold Balpool-Nyang – which had been prone to drought – and bought Nareen, in the Western District of Victoria. He was devastated by the sale of his childhood home, and regarded the day he found out about it as the worst of his life.

=== University ===
In 1949, Fraser moved to England to study at Magdalen College, Oxford, which his father had also attended. He read Philosophy, Politics and Economics (PPE), graduating in 1952 with third-class honours. Although Fraser did not excel academically, he regarded his time at Oxford as his intellectual awakening, where he learned "how to think". His college tutor was Harry Weldon, who was a strong influence. His circle of friends at Oxford included Raymond Bonham Carter, Nicolas Browne-Wilkinson, and John Turner. In his second year, he had a relationship with Anne Reid, who as Anne Fairbairn later became a prominent poet. After graduating, Fraser considered taking a law degree or joining the British Army, but eventually decided to return to Australia and take over the running of the family property.

== Early political career ==
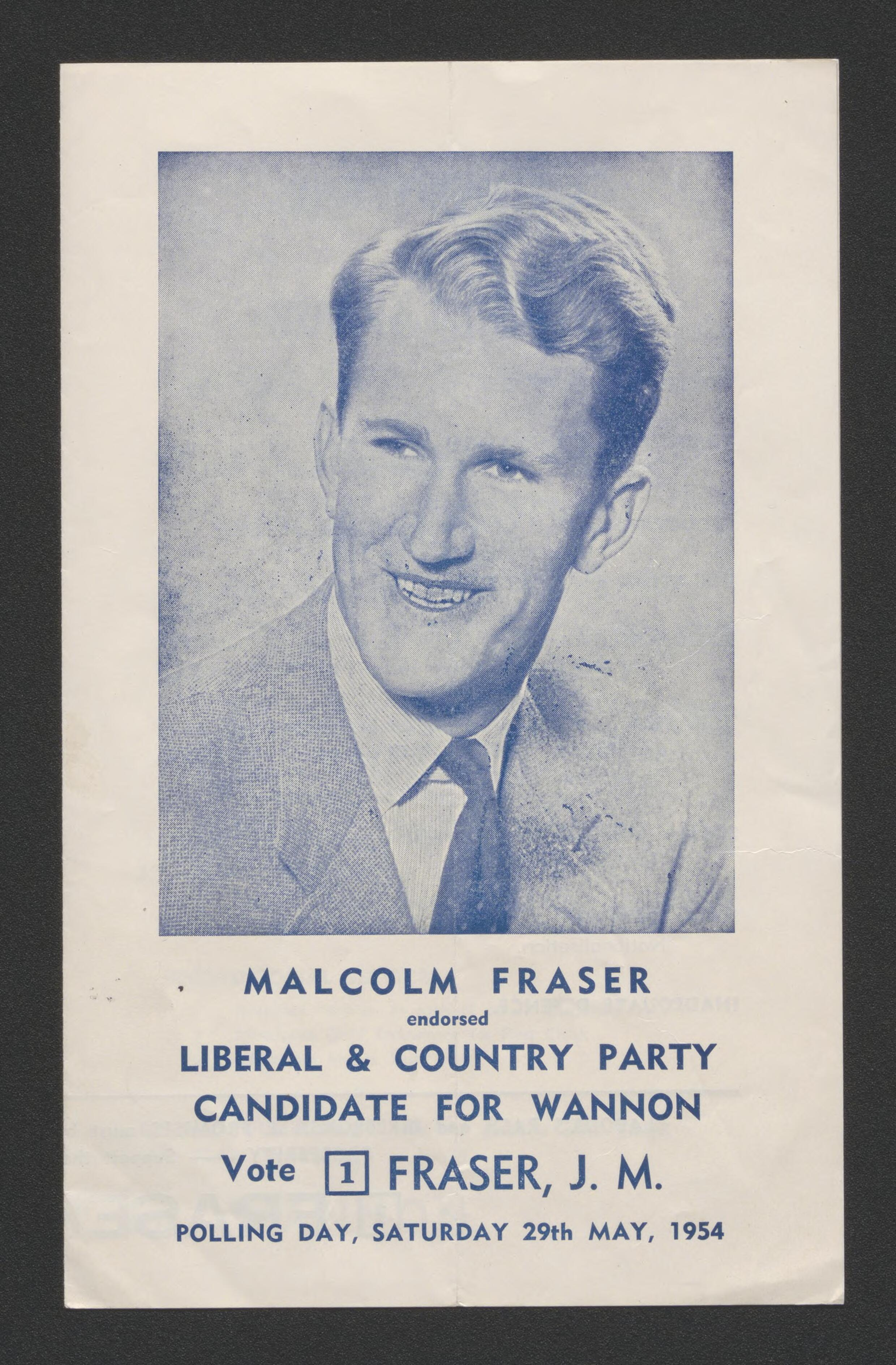
Campaign material used by Fraser at the 1954 federal election, his first candidacy for parliament

Fraser returned to Australia in mid-1952. He began attending meetings of the Young Liberals in Hamilton, and became acquainted with many of the local party officials. In November 1953, aged 23, Fraser unexpectedly won Liberal preselection for the Division of Wannon, which covered most of Victoria's Western District. The previous Liberal member, Dan Mackinnon, had been defeated in 1951 and moved to a different electorate. He was expected to be succeeded by Magnus Cormack, who had recently lost his place in the Senate. Fraser had put his name forward as a way of building a profile for future candidacies, but mounted a strong campaign and in the end won a narrow victory. In January 1954, he made the first of a series of weekly radio broadcasts on 3HA Hamilton and 3YB Warrnambool, titled One Australia. His program – consisting of a pre-recorded 15-minute monologue – covered a wide range of topics, and was often reprinted in newspapers. It continued more or less uninterrupted until his retirement from politics in 1983, and helped him build a substantial personal following in his electorate.

At the 1954 election, Fraser lost to the sitting Labor member Don McLeod by just 17 votes (out of over 37,000 cast). However, he reprised his candidacy at the early 1955 election after a redistribution made Wannon notionally Liberal. McLeod concluded the reconfigured Wannon was unwinnable and retired. These factors, combined with the 1955 Labor Party split, allowed Fraser to win a landslide victory.

== Backbencher ==
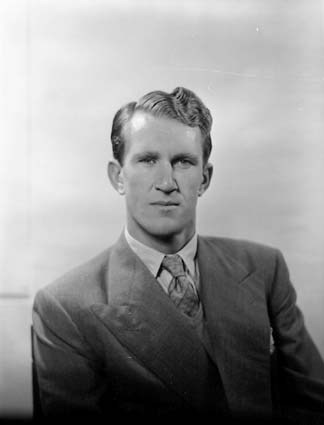
Fraser in 1956, shortly after his election to Parliament

Fraser took his seat in parliament at the age of 25 – the youngest sitting MP by four years, and the first who had been too young to serve in World War II. He was re-elected at the 1958 election despite being restricted in his campaigning by a bout of hepatitis. Fraser was soon being touted as a future member of cabinet, but despite good relations with Robert Menzies never served in cabinet during Menzies' tenure. His long wait for ministerial preferment was probably due to a combination of his youth and the fact that Menzies' ministries already contained a disproportionately high number of Victorians.

Fraser spoke on a wide range of topics during his early years in parliament, but took a particular interest in foreign affairs. In 1964, he and Gough Whitlam were both awarded Leader Grants by the United States Department of State, allowing them to spend two months in Washington, D.C., getting to know American political and military leaders. The Vietnam War was the main topic of conversation, and on his return trip to Australia he spent two days in Saigon. Early in 1965, he also made a private seven-day visit to Jakarta, and with assistance from Ambassador Mick Shann secured meetings with various high-ranking officials.

== Cabinet Minister and Gorton downfall ==
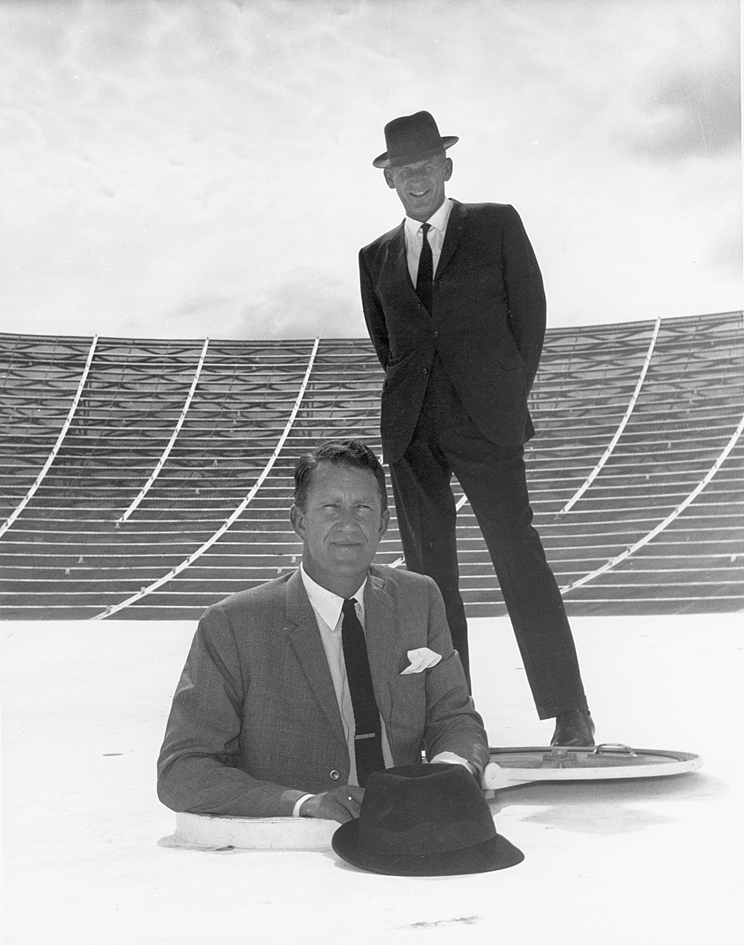
Fraser as Minister for Education and Science in 1969, with John England

In 1966, after Fraser had spent more than a decade on the backbench, Sir Robert Menzies retired as prime minister. His successor Harold Holt appointed Fraser to the ministry as Minister for the Army. In that position, Fraser presided over the Vietnam War conscription program.

Following Holt's death, John Gorton was elected prime minister and Fraser was elevated to Cabinet as Minister for Education and Science. In 1969 he was promoted to Minister for Defence, a particularly challenging post at the time, given the height of Australia's involvement in the Vietnam War and the protests against it.

In March 1971 Fraser abruptly resigned from the Cabinet in protest at what he called Gorton's "interference in [his] ministerial responsibilities", and denounced Gorton on the floor of the House of Representatives as "not fit to hold the great office of Prime Minister". This precipitated a series of events which eventually led to the downfall of Gorton and his replacement as prime minister by William McMahon. In the leadership contest that followed Gorton's resignation, Fraser unsuccessfully contested the deputy Liberal leadership against Gorton and David Fairbairn. Gorton never forgave Fraser for the role he played in his downfall; to the day Gorton died in 2002, he could not bear to be in the same room with Fraser.

Fraser remained on the backbenches until he was reinstated to Cabinet in his old position of Minister for Education and Science by McMahon in August 1971, immediately following Gorton's sacking as deputy Liberal leader by McMahon. When the Liberals were defeated at the 1972 election by the Labor Party under Gough Whitlam, McMahon resigned and Fraser became Shadow Minister for Labour under Billy Snedden.

== Opposition (1972–1975) ==
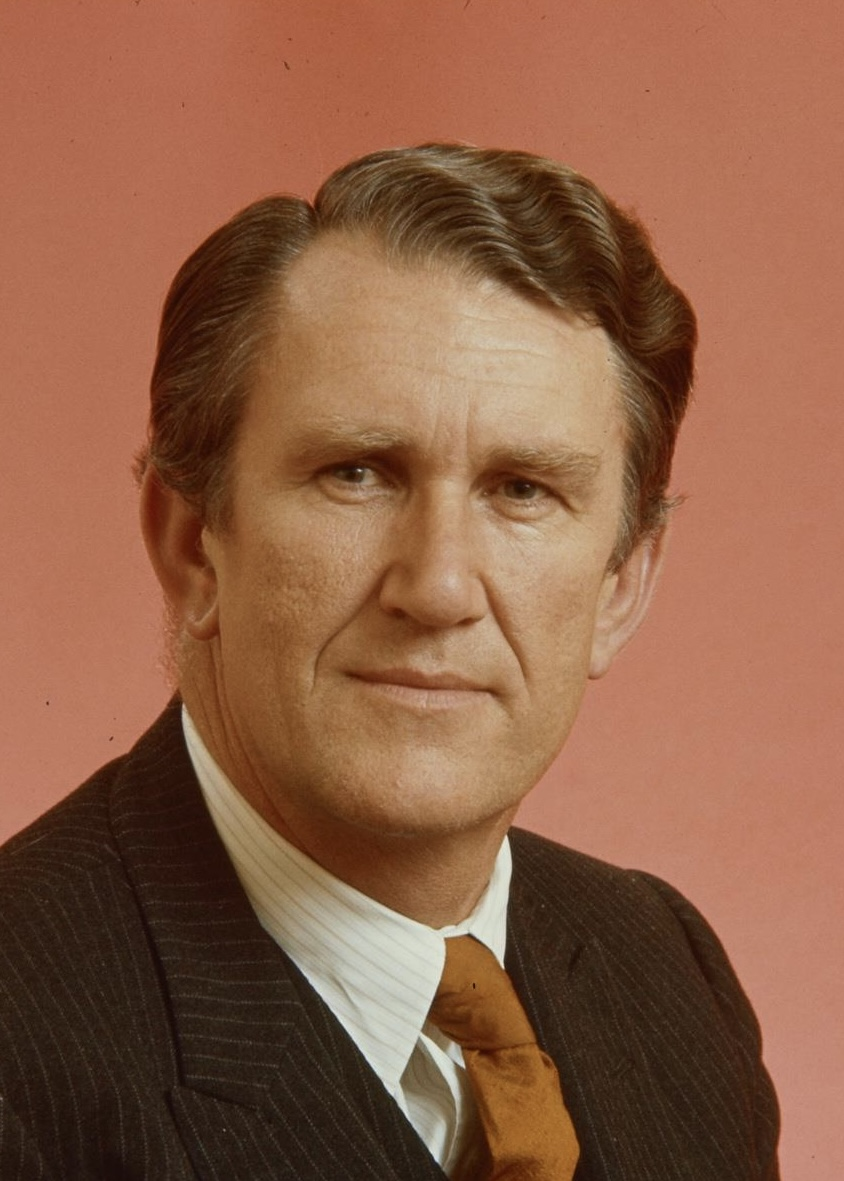
Fraser in 1974.

After the Coalition lost the 1972 election, Fraser was one of five candidates for the Liberal leadership that had been vacated by McMahon. He outpolled John Gorton and James Killen, but was eliminated on the third ballot. Billy Snedden eventually defeated Nigel Bowen by a single vote on the fifth ballot. In the new shadow cabinet – which featured only Liberals – Fraser was given responsibility for primary industry. This was widely seen as a snub, as the new portfolio kept him mostly out of the public eye and was likely to be given to a member of the Country Party when the Coalition returned to government. In an August 1973 reshuffle, Snedden instead made him the Liberals' spokesman for industrial relations. He had hoped to be given responsibility for foreign affairs (in place of the retiring Nigel Bowen), but that role was given to Andrew Peacock. Fraser oversaw the development of the party's new industrial relations policy, which was released in April 1974. It was seen as more flexible and even-handed than the policy that the Coalition had pursued in government, and was received well by the media. According to Fraser's biographer Philip Ayres, by "putting a new policy in place, he managed to modify his public image and emerge as an excellent communicator across a traditionally hostile divide".

=== Leader of the Opposition ===
After the Liberals lost the 1974 election, Fraser unsuccessfully challenged Snedden for the leadership in November. Despite surviving the challenge, Snedden's position in opinion polls continued to decline and he was unable to get the better of Whitlam in the Parliament. Fraser again challenged Snedden on 21 March 1975, this time succeeding and becoming Leader of the Liberal Party and Leader of the Opposition.

=== Role in the Dismissal ===
Following a series of ministerial scandals engulfing the Whitlam government later that year, Fraser began to instruct Coalition senators to delay the government's budget bills, with the objective of forcing an early election that he believed he would win. After several months of political deadlock, during which time the government secretly explored methods of obtaining supply funding outside the Parliament, the Governor-General, Sir John Kerr, controversially dismissed Whitlam as prime minister on 11 November 1975.

Fraser was immediately sworn in as caretaker prime minister on the condition that he end the political deadlock and call an immediate double dissolution election.

On 19 November 1975, shortly after the election had been called, a letter bomb was sent to Fraser, but it was intercepted and defused before it reached him. Similar devices were sent to the governor-general and the Premier of Queensland, Joh Bjelke-Petersen.

== Prime Minister (1975–1983) ==
=== 1975 and 1977 federal elections ===
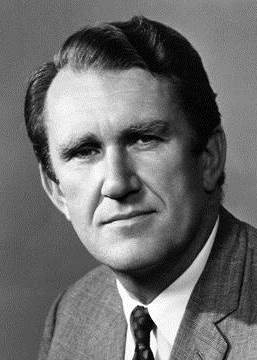
Fraser in 1975

At the 1975 election, Fraser led the Liberal-Country Party Coalition to a landslide victory. The Coalition won 91 seats of a possible 127 in the election to gain a 55-seat majority, which remains to date the largest in Australian history. Fraser subsequently led the Coalition to a second victory in 1977, with only a very small decrease in their vote. The Liberals actually won a majority in their own right in both of these elections, something that Menzies and Holt had never achieved. Although Fraser thus had no need for the support of the (National) Country Party to govern, he retained the formal Coalition between the two parties. This is likely because the Liberals needed the Country Party's support to pass bills in the Senate, since they came up just short of majorities in their own right in both 1975 and 1977.

=== Fiscal policy ===
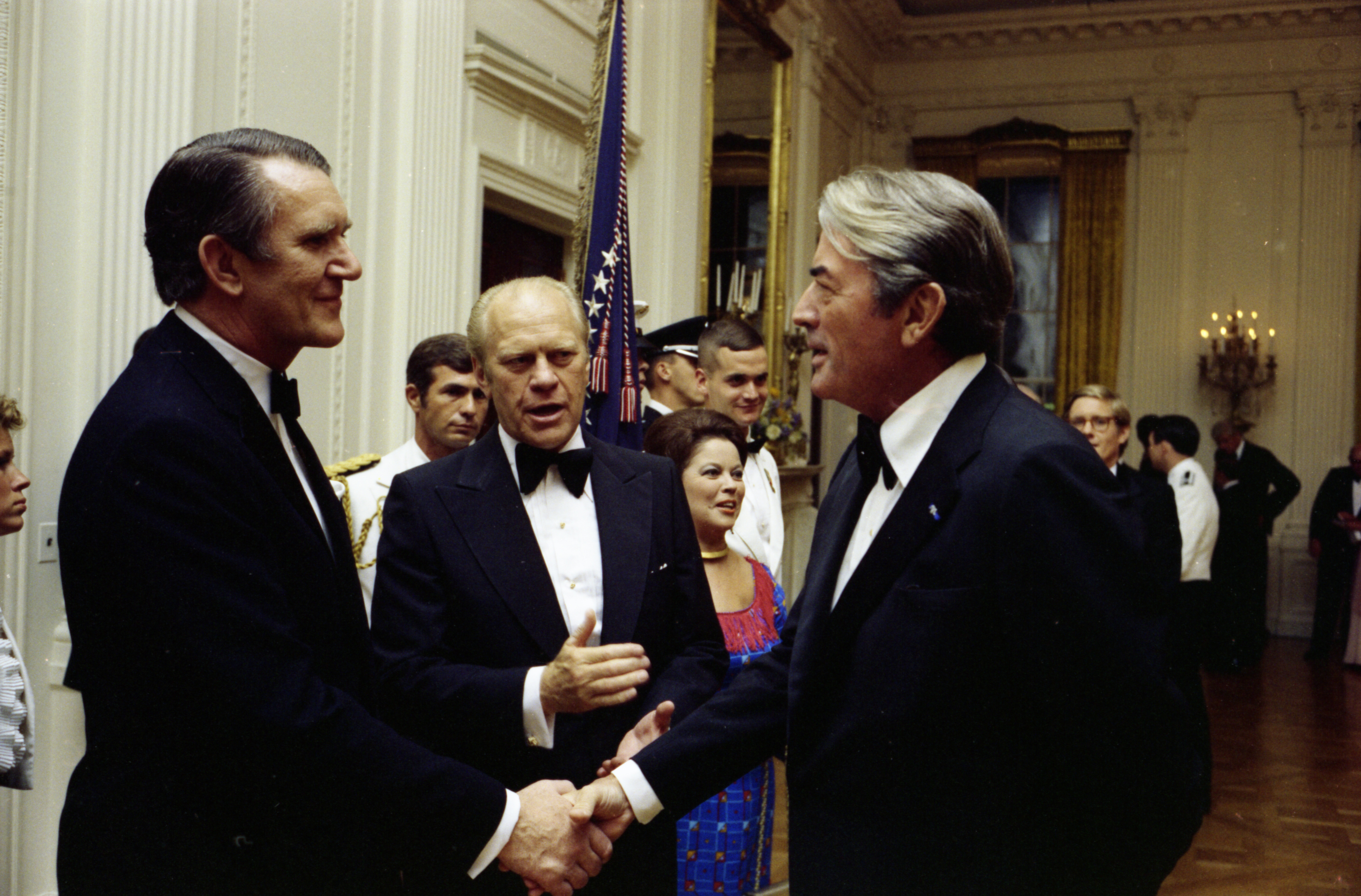
Fraser at a White House state dinner in 1976, being introduced to actor Gregory Peck by President Gerald Ford. Actress Shirley Temple can also be seen behind Ford.

Fraser quickly dismantled some of the programs of the Whitlam government, such as the Ministry of the Media, and made major changes to the universal health insurance system Medibank. He initially maintained Whitlam's levels of tax and spending, but real per-person tax and spending soon began to increase. He did manage to rein in inflation, which had soared after the 1973 oil crisis, when OPEC nations refused to sell oil to nations that supported Israel in the Yom Kippur War. His so-called "Razor Gang" implemented stringent budget cuts across many areas of the Commonwealth Public Sector, including the Australian Broadcasting Corporation (ABC).

Fraser practised Keynesian economics during his time as prime minister, in part demonstrated by running budget deficits throughout his term as prime minister. He was the Liberal Party's last Keynesian prime minister. Though he had long been identified with the Liberal Party's right wing, he did not carry out the radically conservative program that his political enemies had predicted, and that some of his followers wanted. Fraser's relatively moderate policies particularly disappointed the Treasurer, John Howard, as well as other ministers who were strong adherents of fiscal conservatism and economic liberalism, and therefore detractors of Keynesian economics. The government's economic record was marred by rising double-digit unemployment and double-digit inflation, creating "stagflation", caused in part by the ongoing effects of the 1973 oil crisis.

=== Foreign policy ===
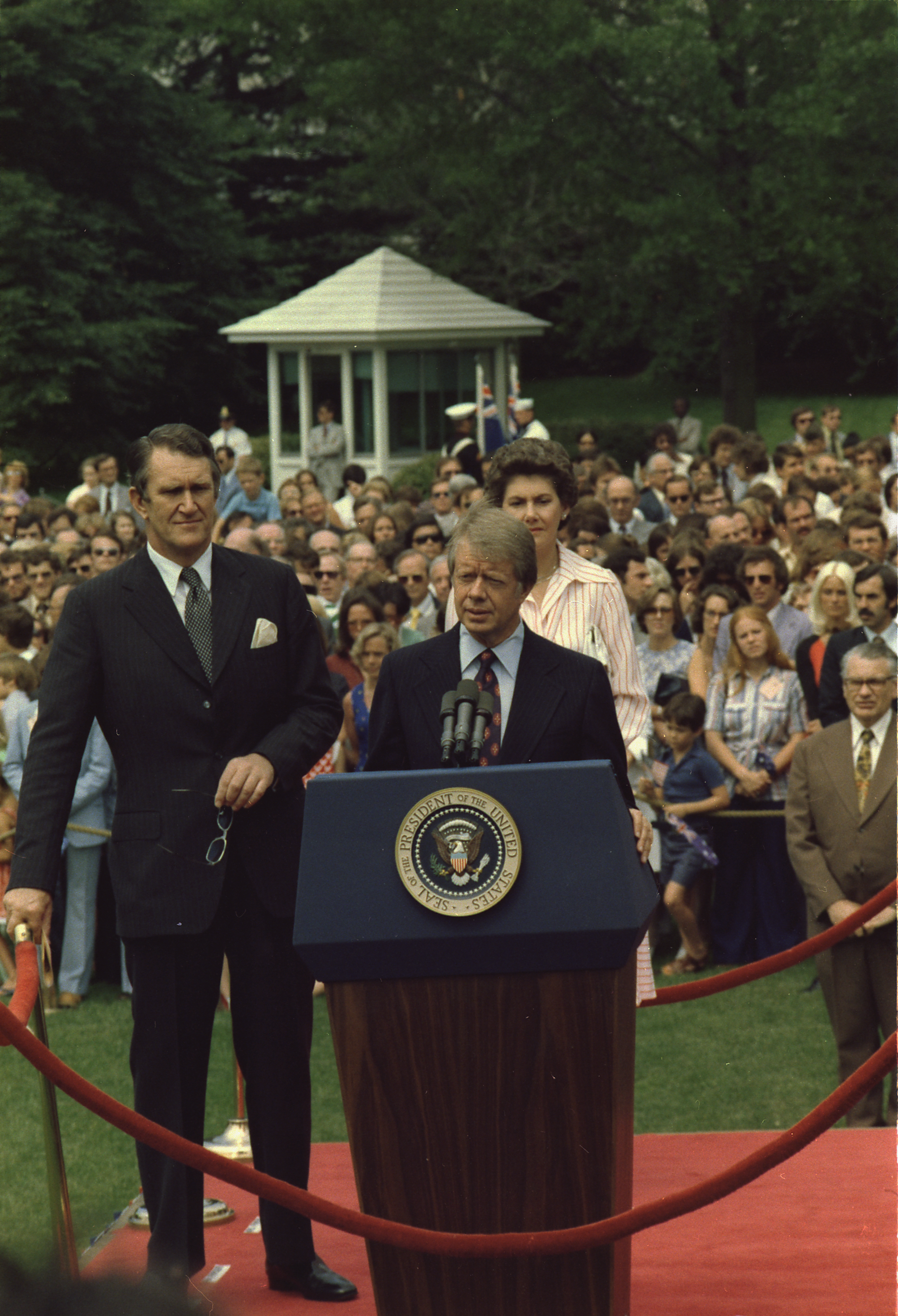
Fraser and US president Jimmy Carter in June 1977

Fraser was particularly active in foreign policy as prime minister. He supported the Commonwealth in campaigning to abolish apartheid in South Africa and refused permission for the aircraft carrying the Springbok rugby team to refuel on Australian territory en route to their controversial 1981 tour of New Zealand. However, an earlier tour by the South African ski boat angling team was allowed to pass through Australia on the way to New Zealand in 1977 and the transit records were suppressed by Cabinet order.

Fraser also strongly opposed white minority rule in Rhodesia. During the 1979 Commonwealth Conference, Fraser, together with his Nigerian counterpart, convinced the newly elected British prime minister, Margaret Thatcher, to withhold recognition of the internal settlement Zimbabwe Rhodesia government; Thatcher had earlier promised to recognise it. Subsequently, the Lancaster House Agreement was signed and Robert Mugabe was elected leader of an independent Zimbabwe at the inaugural 1980 election. Duncan Campbell, a former deputy secretary of the Department of Foreign Affairs and Trade has stated that Fraser was "the principal architect" in the ending of white minority rule. The president of Tanzania, Julius Nyerere, said that he considered Fraser's role "crucial in many parts" and the president of Zambia, Kenneth Kaunda, called his contribution "vital".

Under Fraser, Australia recognised Indonesia's annexation of East Timor, although many East Timorese refugees were granted asylum in Australia.

Fraser was also a strong supporter of the United States and supported the boycott of the 1980 Summer Olympics in Moscow. However, although he persuaded some sporting bodies not to compete, Fraser did not try to prevent the Australian Olympic Committee sending a team to the Moscow Games.

=== Other policy ===
Fraser also surprised his critics over immigration policy; according to 1977 Cabinet documents, the Fraser government adopted a formal policy for "a humanitarian commitment to admit refugees for resettlement". Fraser's aim was to expand immigration from Asian countries and allow more refugees to enter Australia. He was a firm supporter of multiculturalism and established a government-funded multilingual radio and television network, the Special Broadcasting Service (SBS), building on their first radio stations which had been established under the Whitlam government.

Despite Fraser's support for SBS, his government imposed stringent budget cuts on the national broadcaster, the ABC, which came under repeated attack from the Coalition for alleged "left-wing bias" and "unfair" coverage on their TV programs, including This Day Tonight and Four Corners, and on the ABC's new youth-oriented radio station Double Jay. One result of the cuts was a plan to establish a national youth radio network, of which Double Jay was the first station. The network was delayed for many years and did not come to fruition until the 1990s.

Fraser also legislated to give Indigenous Australians control of their traditional lands in the Northern Territory, but resisted imposing land rights laws on conservative state governments.

=== 1980 federal election ===
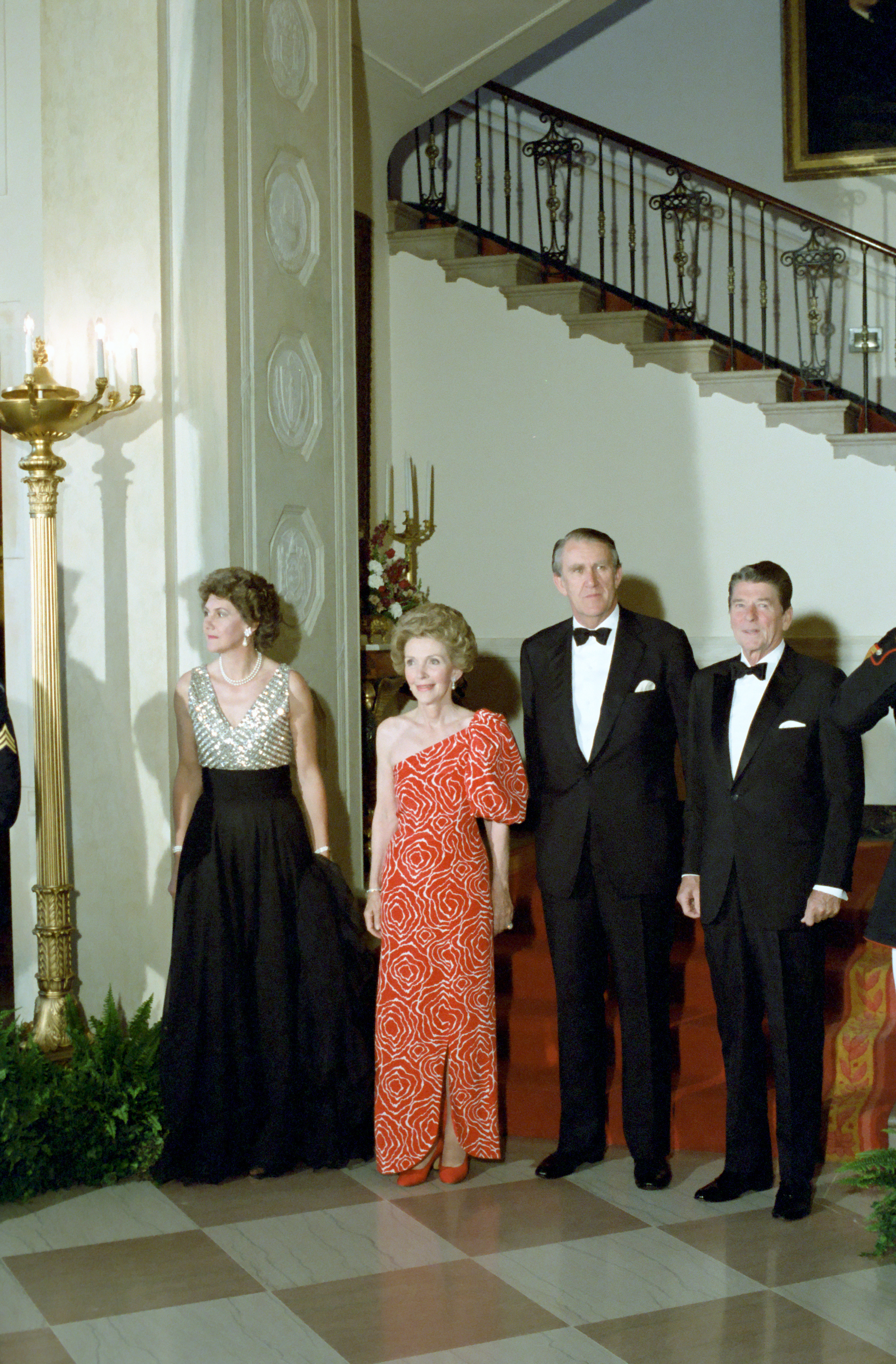
The Frasers with Ronald and Nancy Reagan at the White House in 1982

At the 1980 election, Fraser saw his majority more than halved, from 48 seats to 21. The Coalition also lost control of the Senate. Despite this, Fraser remained ahead of Labor leader Bill Hayden in opinion polls. However, the economy was hit by the early 1980s recession, and a protracted scandal over tax-avoidance schemes run by some high-profile Liberals also began to hurt the government.

=== Disputes within the Liberal Party ===
In April 1981, the Minister for Industrial Relations, Andrew Peacock, resigned from the Cabinet, accusing Fraser of "constant interference in his portfolio". Fraser, however, had accused former prime minister John Gorton of the same thing a decade earlier. Peacock subsequently challenged Fraser for the leadership; although Fraser defeated Peacock, these events left him politically weakened.

During the midst of the 1981 Qantas strike, British businessman Alistair McAlpine recalled an occasion in his memoir during which Fraser arrived by private jet to Perth, and walked into the foyer of the Parmelia Hotel which was crammed with stranded tourists left sitting on their luggage awaiting news, whereupon Fraser ignored them all.

=== Labor Party and 1983 federal election ===
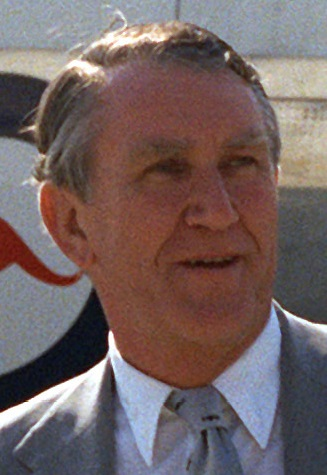
Fraser in 1982, towards the end of his tenure in office

By early 1982, the popular former ACTU President, Bob Hawke, who had entered Parliament in 1980, was polling well ahead of both Fraser and the Labor Leader, Bill Hayden, on the question of who voters would rather see as prime minister. Fraser was well aware of the infighting this caused between Hayden and Hawke and had planned to call a snap election in autumn 1982, preventing the Labor Party changing leaders. These plans were derailed when Fraser suffered a severe back injury. Shortly after recovering from his injury, the Liberal Party narrowly won a by-election in the marginal seat of Flinders in December 1982. The failure of the Labor Party to win the seat convinced Fraser that he would be able to win an election against Hayden.

As leadership tensions began to grow in the Labor Party throughout January, Fraser subsequently resolved to call a double dissolution election at the earliest opportunity, hoping to capitalise on Labor's disunity. He knew that if the writs were issued soon enough, Labor would essentially be frozen into going into the subsequent election with Hayden as leader.

On 3 February 1983, Fraser arranged to visit the Governor-General of Australia, Sir Ninian Stephen, intending to ask for a surprise election. However, Fraser made his run too late. Without any knowledge of Fraser's plans, Hayden resigned as Labor leader just two hours before Fraser travelled to Government House. This meant that the considerably more popular Hawke was able to replace him at almost exactly the same time that the writs were issued for the election. Although Fraser reacted to the move by saying he looked forward to "knock[ing] two Labor Leaders off in one go" at the forthcoming election, Labor immediately surged in the opinion polls.

At the election on 5 March the Coalition was heavily defeated, suffering a 24-seat swing, the worst defeat of a non-Labor government since Federation. Fraser immediately announced his resignation as Liberal leader and formally resigned as prime minister on 11 March 1983; he retired from Parliament two months later. To date, he is the last non-interim prime minister from a rural seat.

== Retirement ==
In retirement Fraser was Chairman of the UN Panel of Eminent Persons on the Role of Transnational Corporations in South Africa 1985, as Co-Chairman of the Commonwealth Group of Eminent Persons on South Africa in 1985–86 (appointed by Prime Minister Hawke), and as Chairman of the UN secretary-general's Expert Group on African Commodity Issues in 1989–90. He was a distinguished international fellow at the American Enterprise Institute from 1984 to 1986. Fraser helped to establish the foreign aid group CARE organisation in Australia and became the agency's international president in 1991, and worked with a number of other charitable organisations. In 2006, he was appointed Professorial Fellow at the Asia Pacific Centre for Military Law, and in October 2007 he presented his inaugural professorial lecture, "Finding Security in Terrorism's Shadow: The importance of the rule of law".

=== Memphis trousers affair ===
On 14 October 1986, Fraser, then the chairman of the Commonwealth Eminent Persons Group, was found in the foyer of the Admiral Benbow Inn, a Memphis hotel, wearing only a pair of underpants and confused as to where his trousers were. The hotel was an establishment popular with prostitutes and drug dealers. Though it was rumoured at the time that the former prime minister had been with a prostitute, his wife stated that Fraser had no recollection of the events and that she believes it more likely that he was the victim of a practical joke by his fellow delegates.

=== Estrangement from the Liberal Party ===
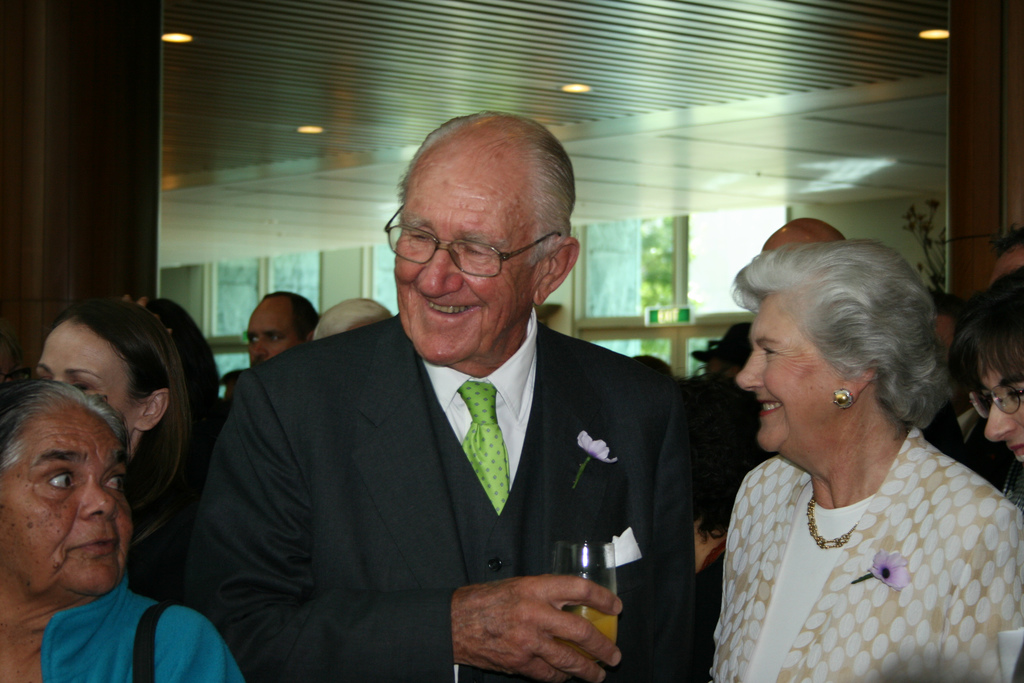
Fraser at Parliament House in 2008, for Kevin Rudd's national apology to the Stolen Generations

In 1993, Fraser made a bid for the Liberal Party presidency but withdrew at the last minute following opposition to his bid, which was raised due to his having been critical of then Liberal leader John Hewson for losing the election earlier that year.

After 1996, Fraser was critical of the Howard Coalition government over foreign policy issues, particularly John Howard's alignment with the foreign policy of the Bush administration, which Fraser saw as damaging Australian relationships in Asia. He opposed Howard's policy on asylum-seekers, campaigned in support of an Australian Republic and attacked what he perceived as a lack of integrity in Australian politics, together with former Labor prime minister Gough Whitlam, finding much common ground with his predecessor and his successor Bob Hawke, another republican.

The 2001 election continued his estrangement from the Liberal Party. Many Liberals criticised the Fraser years as "a decade of lost opportunity" on deregulation of the Australian economy and other issues. In early 2004, a Young Liberal convention in Hobart called for Fraser's life membership of the Liberal Party to be ended.

In 2006, Fraser criticised Howard Liberal government policies on areas such as refugees, terrorism and civil liberties, and that "if Australia continues to follow United States policies, it runs the risk of being embroiled in the conflict in Iraq for decades, and a fear of Islam in the Australian community will take years to eradicate". Fraser claimed that the way the Howard government handled the David Hicks, Cornelia Rau and Vivian Solon cases was questionable.

On 20 July 2007, Fraser sent an open letter to members of the large activist group GetUp!, encouraging members to support GetUp's campaign for a change in policy on Iraq including a clearly defined exit strategy. Fraser stated: "One of the things we should say to the Americans, quite simply, is that if the United States is not prepared to involve itself in high-level diplomacy concerning Iraq and other Middle East questions, our forces will be withdrawn before Christmas."

After the defeat of the Howard government at the 2007 federal election, Fraser claimed Howard approached him in a corridor, following a cabinet meeting in May 1977 regarding Vietnamese refugees, and said: "We don't want too many of these people. We're doing this just for show, aren't we?" The claims were made by Fraser in an interview to mark the release of the 1977 cabinet papers. Howard, through a spokesman, denied having made the comment.

In October 2007 Fraser gave a speech to Melbourne Law School on terrorism and "the importance of the rule of law," which Liberal MP Sophie Mirabella condemned in January 2008, claiming errors and "either intellectual sloppiness or deliberate dishonesty", and claimed that he tacitly supported Islamic fundamentalism, that he should have no influence on foreign policy, and claimed his stance on the war on terror had left him open to caricature as a "frothing-at-the-mouth leftie".

Shortly after Tony Abbott won the 2009 Liberal Party leadership spill, Fraser ended his Liberal Party membership, stating the party was "no longer a liberal party but a conservative party".

=== Later political activity ===
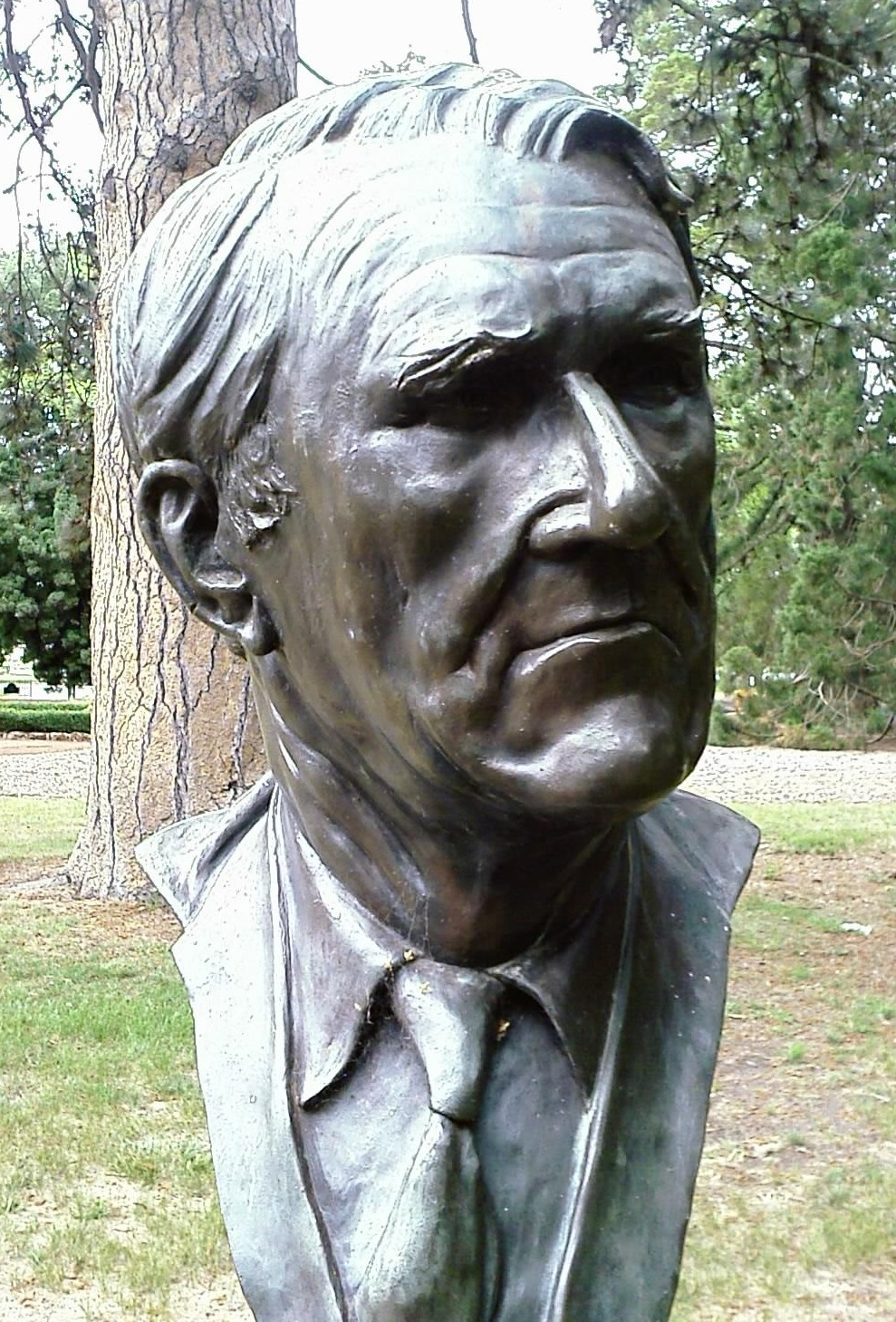
Bust of Malcolm Fraser by political cartoonist, caricaturist and sculptor Peter Nicholson located in the Prime Minister's Avenue in the Ballarat Botanical Gardens

In December 2011, Fraser was highly critical of the Australian government's decision (also supported by the Liberal Party Opposition) to permit the export of uranium to India, relaxing the Fraser government's policy of banning sales of uranium to countries that are not signatories of the Nuclear Non-Proliferation Treaty.

In 2012, Fraser criticised the basing of US military forces in Australia.

In late 2012, Fraser wrote a foreword for the journal Jurisprudence where he openly criticised the current state of human rights in Australia and the Western World. "It is a sobering thought that in recent times, freedoms hard won through centuries of struggle, in the United Kingdom and elsewhere have been whittled away. In Australia alone we have laws that allow the secret detention of the innocent. We have had a vast expansion of the power of intelligence agencies. In many cases the onus of proof has been reversed and the justice that once prevailed has been gravely diminished."

In July 2013, Fraser endorsed Australian Greens Senator Sarah Hanson-Young for re-election in a television advertisement, stating she had been a "reasonable and fair-minded voice".

Fraser's books include Malcolm Fraser: The Political Memoirs (with Margaret Simons – The Miegunyah Press, 2010) and Dangerous Allies (Melbourne University Press, 2014), which warns of "strategic dependence" on the United States. In the book and in talks promoting it, he criticised the concept of American exceptionalism and US foreign policy.

== Personal life ==
=== Marriage and children ===
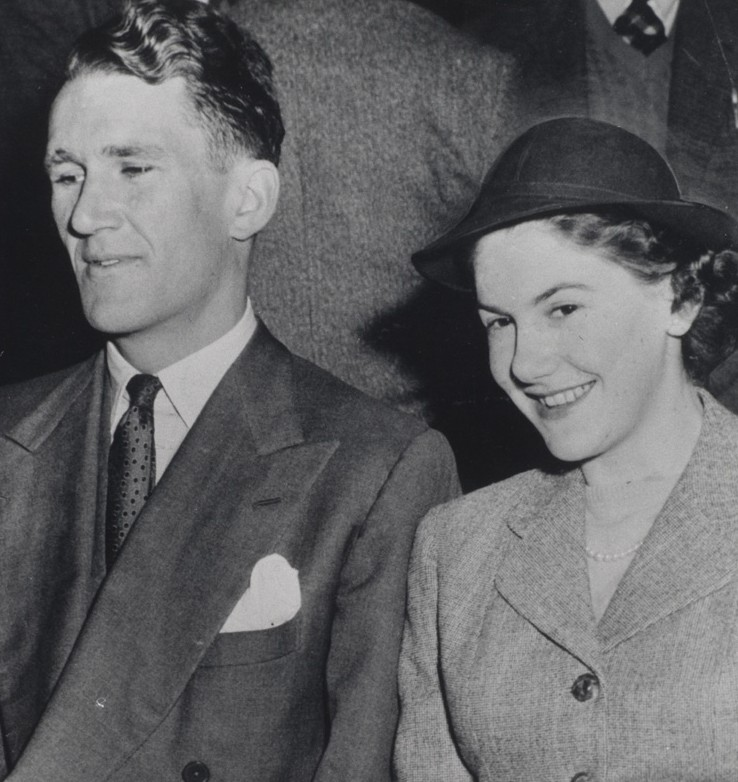
Malcolm and Tamie Fraser at a political event in 1958

On 9 December 1956, Fraser married Tamara "Tamie" Beggs, who was almost six years his junior. They had met at a New Year's Eve party, and bonded over similar personal backgrounds and political views. The couple had four children together: Mark (b. 1958), Angela (b. 1960), Hugh (b. 1962), and Phoebe (b. 1964). Tamie frequently assisted her husband in campaigning, and her gregariousness was seen as complementing his more shy and reserved nature. She advised him on most of the important decisions in his career, and in retirement he observed that "if she had been prime minister in 1983, we would have won".

He was the former no. 1 ticket holder for the Carlton Football Club in the AFL.

=== Views on religion ===
Fraser attended Anglican schools, although his parents were Presbyterian. In university he was inclined towards atheism, once writing that "the idea that God exists is a nonsense". However, his beliefs became less definite over time and tended towards agnosticism. During his political career, he occasionally self-described as Christian, such as in a 1975 interview with The Catholic Weekly. Margaret Simons, the co-author of Fraser's memoirs, thought that he was "not religious, and yet thinks religion is a necessary thing". In a 2010 interview with her, he said: "I would probably like to be less logical and, you know, really able to believe there is a God, whether it is Allah, or the Christian God, or some other – but I think I studied too much philosophy ... you can never know".

== Death and legacy ==
Fraser's grave within the Prime Ministers Garden of Melbourne General Cemetery

Fraser died on 20 March 2015 at the age of 84, after a brief illness. An obituary noted that there had been "greater appreciation of the constructive and positive nature of his post-prime ministerial contribution" as his retirement years progressed. Fraser's death came five months after that of his predecessor and political rival Gough Whitlam.

Upon his death, Fraser's 1983 nemesis and often bitter opponent Bob Hawke fondly described him as a "very significant figure in the history of Australian politics" who, in his post-Prime Ministerial years, "became an outstanding figure in the advancement of human rights issues in all respects", praised him for being "extraordinarily generous and welcoming to refugees from Indochina" and concluded that Fraser had "moved that far to the left that he was almost out of sight". Andrew Peacock, who had challenged Fraser for the Liberal leadership and later succeeded him, said that he had "a deep respect and pleasurable memories of the first five years of the Fraser government... I disagreed with him later on but during that period in the 1970s he was a very effective Prime Minister", and lamented that "despite all my arguments with him later on I am filled with admiration for his efforts on China".

Fraser was given a state funeral at Scots' Church in Melbourne on 27 March 2015. His ashes are interred within the Prime Ministers' Garden of Melbourne General Cemetery.

In 2004, Fraser designated the University of Melbourne the official custodian of his personal papers and library to create the Malcolm Fraser Collection at the university.

A street in Abuja, Nigeria, is named after Malcolm Fraser.

In June 2018, he was honoured with the naming of the Australian Electoral Division of Fraser in the inner north-western suburbs of Melbourne.

== Published works ==
- Malcolm Fraser: The Political Memoirs (Melbourne: The Miegunyah Press, 2010).
- Dangerous Allies (Melbourne: Melbourne University Press, 2014).

== Honours ==
Orders

- 1977 Member of the Order of the Companions of Honour (CH)
- 1988 Companion of the Order of Australia (AC)

Foreign honours

- (Latvia) 1999 Order of the Three Stars, 3rd Class (Commander)
- 2006 Grand Cordon of the Order of the Rising Sun from the Emperor of Japan
- (Papua New Guinea) 2009 Grand Companion of the Order of Logohu (GCL)

Organisations

- (Australia) 2000 Australian Human Rights Commission, Human Rights Medal

=== Appointments ===
Personal

- 1976 Her Majesty's Most Honourable Privy Council (PC)

Fellowships

- (Victoria (state)) Professorial Fellow, Asia Pacific Centre for Military Law at the University of Melbourne
- Vice-president and Fellow of the Royal Commonwealth Society (RCS)

Academic degrees

- (United States) University of South Carolina, Honorary Doctor of Laws
- (Victoria (state)) Deakin University, Honorary Doctor of the University
- (New South Wales) University of Technology, Sydney, Honorary Doctor of Laws
- University of New South Wales, Honorary Doctor of Laws
- (Western Australia) Murdoch University, Honorary Doctor of Laws

== See also ==
- 1975 Australian constitutional crisis
- First Fraser Ministry
- Second Fraser Ministry
- Third Fraser Ministry
- Fourth Fraser Ministry

== Bibliography ==
- Ayres, Philip (1987). Malcolm Fraser, a Biography. Heinemann, Richmond, Victoria. ISBN 0-85561-060-3.
- Simons, Margaret; Fraser, Malcolm (2010). Malcolm Fraser: The Political Memoirs. Melbourne University Publishing Limited (Miegunyah Press). ISBN 978-0-522-85579-1.
- Williams, Roy (2013). In God They Trust?: The Religious Beliefs of Australia's Prime Ministers, 1901–2013. Bible Society Australia. ISBN 9780647518557.

Parliament of Australia
Preceded by Don McLeod	Member for Wannon; 1955–1983	Succeeded by David Hawker
Preceded by Sir William McMahon	Father of the House of Representatives; 1982–1983; With: Sir James Killen and Sir Billy Snedden	Succeeded by Sir James Killen and Sir Billy Snedden
Preceded by Sir William McMahon	Father of the Parliament; 1982–1983; With: Sir James Killen and Sir Billy Snedden	Succeeded by Sir James Killen and Sir Billy Snedden
Political offices
Preceded by Jim Forbes	Minister for the Army; 1966–1968	Succeeded by Phillip Lynch
Preceded by John Gorton	Minister for Education and Science; 1968–1969	Succeeded by Nigel Bowen
Preceded by Allen Fairhall	Minister for Defence; 1969–1971	Succeeded by John Gorton
Preceded by David Fairbairn	Minister for Education and Science; 1971–1972	Succeeded by Gough Whitlam
Preceded by Rex Patterson as Opposition Spokesperson on Primary Industry and Northern Development	Opposition Spokesperson for Primary Industry; 1973	Succeeded by Tony Street
Preceded by Phillip Lynch	Opposition Spokesperson for Immigration; 1973–1974	Succeeded by Michael MacKellar
Preceded by Phillip Lynch	Opposition Spokesperson for Labour; 1973–1975	Succeeded by Tony Street
New office	Opposition Spokesperson for Public Service Matters; 1974–1975	Succeeded by Victor Garland as Opposition Spokesperson for Public Service Matters and the Australian Capital Territory
Preceded by Billy Snedden	Leader of the Opposition of Australia; 1975	Succeeded by Gough Whitlam
Preceded by Gough Whitlam	Prime Minister of Australia; 1975–1983	Succeeded by Bob Hawke
Party political offices
Preceded by Billy Snedden	Leader of the Liberal Party of Australia; 1975–1983	Succeeded by Andrew Peacock
