= Nigel Bowen =

Australian politician and judge (1911–1994)

The Honourable Sir Nigel Bowen AC, KBE
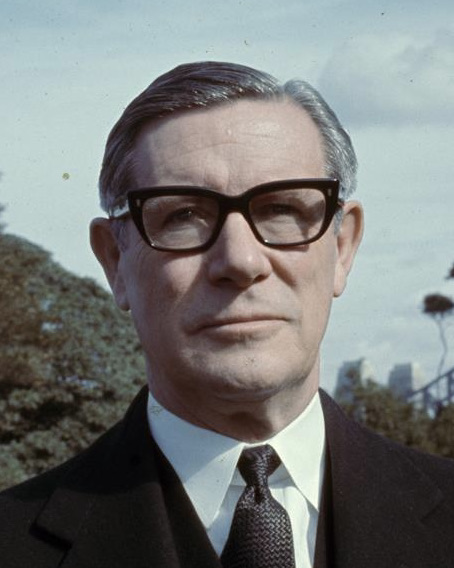
- Bowen in 1971

Chief Justice of the Federal Court of Australia
- In office 20 December 1976 – 31 December 1990
- Nominated by: Malcolm Fraser
- Preceded by: New office
- Succeeded by: Michael Black

Judge of the Supreme Court of New South Wales
- In office 24 July 1973 – 19 December 1976
- Preceded by: Charles McLelland
- Succeeded by: William Deane

Minister for Foreign Affairs
- In office 2 August 1971 – 5 December 1972
- Prime Minister: William McMahon
- Preceded by: Les Bury
- Succeeded by: Gough Whitlam (acting)

Attorney-General of Australia
- In office 22 March 1971 – 2 August 1971
- Prime Minister: William McMahon
- Preceded by: Tom Hughes
- Succeeded by: Ivor Greenwood
- In office 14 December 1966 – 12 November 1969
- Prime Minister: Harold Holt; John McEwen; John Gorton
- Preceded by: Billy Snedden
- Succeeded by: Tom Hughes

Minister for Education and Science
- In office 12 November 1969 – 22 March 1971
- Prime Minister: John Gorton
- Preceded by: Malcolm Fraser
- Succeeded by: David Fairbairn

Member of the Australian Parliament for Parramatta
- In office 20 June 1964 – 11 July 1973
- Preceded by: Garfield Barwick
- Succeeded by: Philip Ruddock

Personal details
- Born: 26 May 1911 Summerland, British Columbia, Canada
- Died: 27 September 1994 (aged 83) Wahroonga, New South Wales, Australia
- Party: Liberal
- Spouses: Eileen Mullens (m. 1947–1983) Ermyn Krippner (m. 1984)
- Profession: Lawyer

Sir Nigel Hubert Bowen, AC, KBE (26 May 1911 – 27 September 1994) was an Australian lawyer, politician and judge. He was a member of the Liberal Party and served in the House of Representatives from 1964 to 1973, representing the New South Wales seat of Parramatta. He held senior ministerial office in multiple Coalition governments, serving as Attorney-General (1966–1969, 1971), Minister for Education and Science (1969–1971), and Minister for Foreign Affairs (1971–1972). After the Coalition lost the 1972 election he was an unsuccessful candidate to replace William McMahon as Liberal leader, losing to Billy Snedden by a single vote. After leaving politics he served as the inaugural chief justice of the Federal Court of Australia (1976–1990).

== Early life ==
Bowen was born on 26 May 1911 in Summerland, British Columbia, Canada. He was the son of Dorothy Joan (née King) and Otway Percival Bowen. His parents, both born in England, were apple farmers.

Bowen and his parents moved to Australia shortly after his birth. They initially settled on a sheep farm in Gunnedah, New South Wales, but following a drought moved to Sydney where his father worked as an accountant. Bowen was sent to school in England from 1919 to 1921 with financial assistance from an aunt. After returning to Australia he attended The King's School, Parramatta, from 1922 to 1927. He subsequently matriculated to the University of Sydney, graduating Bachelor of Arts in 1931 and Bachelor of Laws in 1934. He served his articles of clerkship with Sly and Russell in Sydney and was called to the bar in 1936. He practised "widely across fields that included divorce, probate, and inheritance".

During the Second World War, Bowen volunteered in 1941 and joined the Second Australian Imperial Force in 1942 and served in the South Pacific theatre for two years.

== Legal career ==
After the war, Bowen resumed his legal career, sharing chambers with Gough Whitlam, John Kerr and later Bob Ellicott. He took silk in 1953 in New South Wales and Victoria in 1954. He was president of the New South Wales bar council from 1959 to 1961 and was vice-president of the Law Council of Australia from 1957 to 1960. From 1946 to 1961, he was the editor of the Australian Law Journal.

== Political career ==
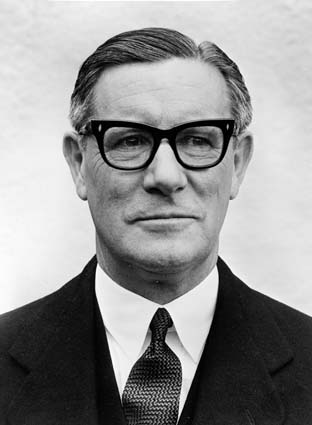
Bowen in 1966

Bowen was elected to parliament at the 1964 Parramatta by-election, caused by the resignation of Sir Garfield Barwick to take up an appointment as Chief Justice of Australia. He was appointed Attorney-General of Australia in the Second Holt Ministry in December 1966, and in 1968 he introduced a bill for the establishment of a federal court junior to the High Court of Australia. Although that bill was withdrawn, it provided the basis of the Federal Court of Australia Act 1976. Bowen appointed the Commonwealth Administrative Review Committee, which reported in 1971 and formed the basis for the establishment of the Administrative Appeals Tribunal, the appointment of a Commonwealth Ombudsman and the enactment of the Administrative Decisions (Judicial Review) Act 1977. He also introduced the Privy Council (Limitation of Appeals) Act 1968, which began the process of abolishing appeals from the High Court to the Privy Council in London, culminating in the Australia Act 1986.

In November 1969, Bowen was appointed Minister for Education and Science in the Second Gorton Ministry. In the McMahon Ministry, he was Attorney-General from March to August 1971 and then Minister for Foreign Affairs until the election of the Whitlam government in 1972. Bowen was William McMahon's preferred candidate to replace William Owen on the High Court, but Anthony Mason was eventually chosen as it was feared that the Liberal Party would not be able to retain Bowen's seat at a by-election. When McMahon resigned after the 1972 election, Bowen lost the resulting leadership vote by one vote to Billy Snedden, on the fifth ballot.

== Judicial career ==
In 1973, Bowen was appointed as Chief Judge in Equity in the Supreme Court of New South Wales. He was appointed first Chief Judge (later Chief Justice) of the Federal Court of Australia in 1976 and held this until his retirement in 1990. Bowen was one of only six politicians to have served in both the Parliament of Australia and the Federal Court of Australia, alongside Bob Ellicott, Merv Everett, Tony Whitlam, John Reeves and Duncan Kerr.

== Personal life ==
In 1947, Bowen married Eileen Mullins, a nurse, with whom he had three daughters. He was widowed in 1983 and in 1984 remarried to Ermyn Winifred Krippner (née Hookway; 1911–1995), a widowed schoolteacher who had been principal of Burwood Girls High School (1961–1976) and whom he had first met while they were both students at Sydney University.

Bowen died in Wahroonga, New South Wales, on 27 September 1994, aged 83. He was granted a state funeral.

== Honours ==
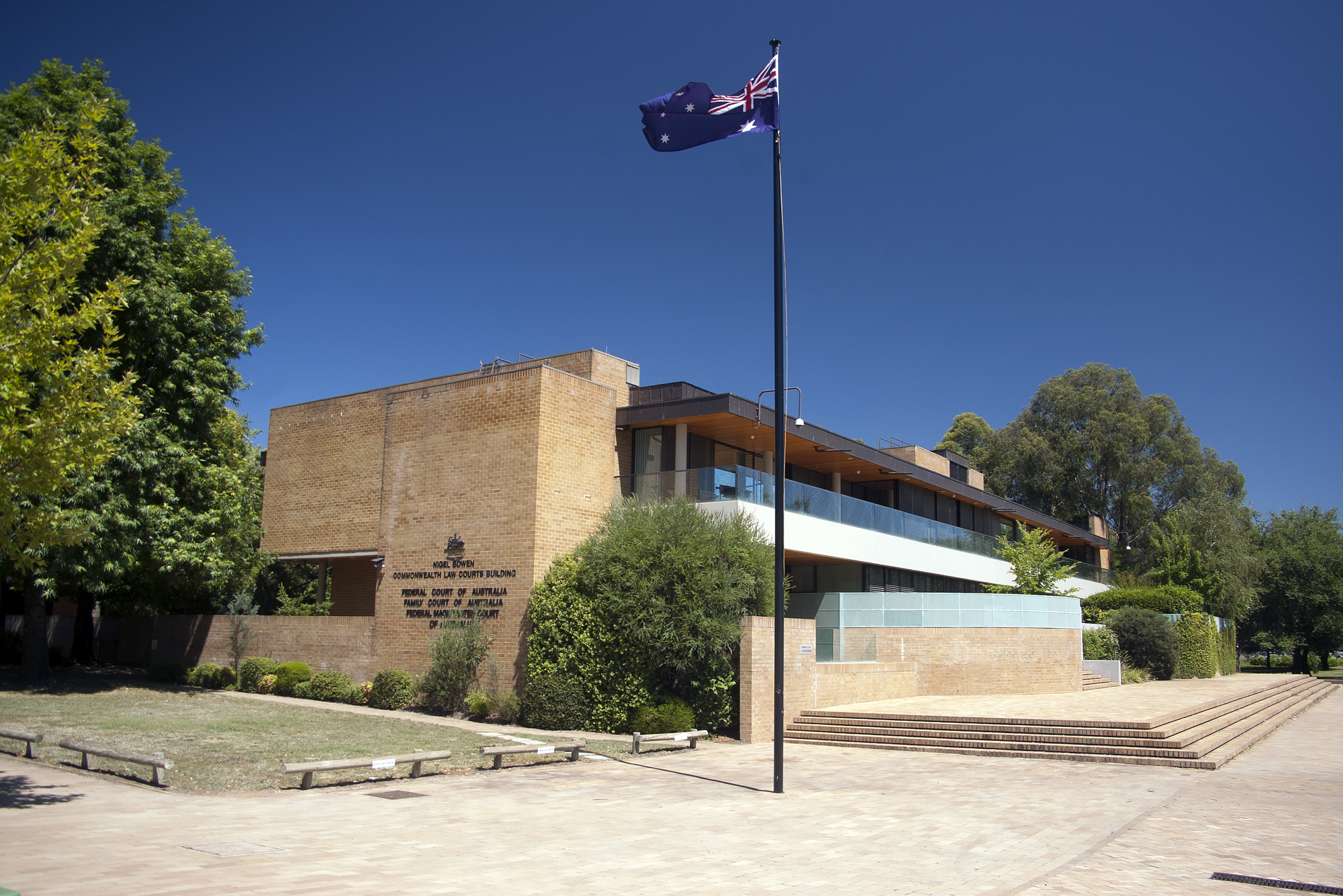
The Nigel Bowen Commonwealth Law Courts Building in Canberra

Bowen was appointed a Knight Commander of the Order of the British Empire in 1976 and a Companion of the Order of Australia in 1988.

The Nigel Bowen Commonwealth Law Courts Building in Canberra was named in Bowen's honour.

Political offices
Preceded by Billy Snedden	Attorney-General of Australia; 1966–1969	Succeeded by Tom Hughes
Preceded by Tom Hughes	Attorney-General; 1971	Succeeded by Ivor Greenwood
Preceded by Malcolm Fraser	Minister for Education and Science; 1969–1971	Succeeded by David Fairbairn
Preceded by Leslie Bury	Minister for Foreign Affairs; 1971–1972	Succeeded by Gough Whitlam
Legal offices
New office	Chief Justice of the Federal Court of Australia; 1976–1990	Succeeded by Michael Black
Parliament of Australia
Preceded by Garfield Barwick	Member for Division of Parramatta; 1964–1973	Succeeded by Philip Ruddock
