= Tenth Menzies ministry =

40th ministry of government of Australia

- 40th Ministry of Australia

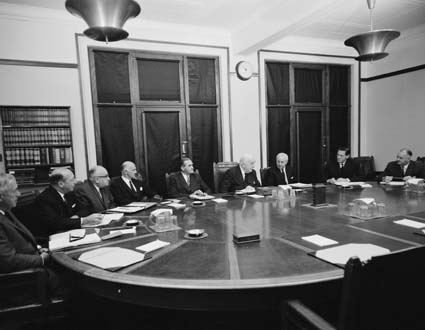
- A cabinet meeting of the Tenth Menzies ministry held on 6 December 1965.
- Date formed: 18 December 1963
- Date dissolved: 26 January 1966

People and organisations
- Monarch: Elizabeth II
- Governor-General: Viscount De L'Isle; Lord Casey
- Prime Minister: Sir Robert Menzies
- No. of ministers: 29
- Member party: Liberal–Country coalition
- Status in legislature: Coalition majority government
- Opposition party: Labor
- Opposition leader: Arthur Calwell

History
- Election: 30 November 1963
- Legislature term: 25th
- Predecessor: Ninth Menzies ministry
- Successor: First Holt ministry

The Tenth Menzies ministry (Liberal–Country Coalition) was the 40th ministry of the Government of Australia. It was led by the country's 12th Prime Minister, Sir Robert Menzies. The Tenth Menzies ministry succeeded the Ninth Menzies ministry, which dissolved on 18 December 1963 following the federal election that took place in November. The ministry was replaced by the First Holt ministry on 26 January 1966 following the retirement of Menzies.

As of 20 December 2020, Ian Sinclair is the last surviving member of the Tenth Menzies ministry; Sinclair is also the last surviving minister of the Holt, McEwen, Gorton, and McMahon governments, as well as the First Fraser ministry. James Forbes was the last surviving Liberal minister, and Allen Fairhall and Charles Barnes were the last surviving Liberal and Country Cabinet ministers respectively.

== Cabinet ==
| Party | Minister | Portrait | Portfolio |
|---|---|---|---|
| Liberal | Sir Robert Menzies (1894–1978) MP for Kooyong (1934–1966) | | Prime Minister; Leader of the Liberal Party (to 20 January 1966) |
| Country | John McEwen (1900–1980) MP for Murray (1949–1971) | | Leader of the Country Party; Minister for Trade and Industry |
| Liberal | Harold Holt (1908–1967) MP for Higgins (1949–1967) | | Leader of the Liberal Party (from 20 January 1966); Deputy Leader of the Liberal Party (to 20 January 1966); Treasurer; Leader of the House |
| Liberal | Sir William Spooner (1897–1966) Senator for New South Wales (1950–1965) | | Leader of the Government in the Senate (to 2 June 1964); Minister for National Development (to 10 June 1964); Vice-President of the Executive Council (to 10 June 1964) |
| Liberal | Paul Hasluck (1905–1993) MP for Curtin (1949–1969) | | Minister for Defence (to 24 April 1964); Minister for External Affairs (from 24 April 1964) |
| Liberal | William McMahon (1908–1988) MP for Lowe (1949–1982) | | Deputy Leader of the Liberal Party (from 20 January 1966); Minister for Labour and National Service; Vice-President of the Executive Council (from 10 June 1964) |
| Liberal | Sir Garfield Barwick (1903–1997) MP for Parramatta (1958–1964) | | Attorney-General (to 4 March 1964); Minister for External Affairs (to 24 April 1964) |
| Country | Charles Adermann (1896–1979) MP for Fisher (1949–1972) | | Deputy Leader of the Country Party; Minister for Primary Industry |
| Liberal | Sir Shane Paltridge (1910-1966) Senator for Western Australia (1951-1966) | | Leader of the Government in the Senate (from 10 June 1964 to 19 January 1966); Minister for Civil Aviation (to 10 June 1964); Minister for Defence (from 24 April 1964 to 19 January 1966) |
| Country | Harrie Wade (1905–1964) Senator for Victoria (1956–1964) | | Minister for Health (to 18 November 1964) |
| Liberal | Allen Fairhall (1909–2006) MP for Paterson (1949–1969) | | Minister for Supply |
| Liberal | Denham Henty (1903–1978) Senator for Tasmania (1950–1968) | | Minister for Customs and Excise (to 10 June 1964); Minister for Civil Aviation (from 10 June 1964) |
| Liberal | Alan Hulme (1907–1989) MP for Petrie (1963–1972) (in Cabinet from 13 June 1964) | | Postmaster-General |
| Liberal | David Fairbairn (1917–1994) MP for Farrer (1949–1975) (in Cabinet from 13 June 1964) | | Minister for Air (to 10 June 1964); Minister for National Development (from 10 June 1964) |
| Country | Charles Barnes (1901–1998) MP for McPherson (1958–1972) (in Cabinet from 13 August 1965) | | Minister for Territories |

== Outer ministry ==
| Party | Minister | Portrait | Portfolio |
|---|---|---|---|
| Country | Hugh Roberton (1900–1987) MP for Riverina (1949–1965) | | Minister for Social Services (to 21 January 1965) |
| Liberal | Gordon Freeth (1914–2001) MP for Forrest (1949–1969) | | Minister for Shipping and Transport |
| Liberal | John Gorton (1911–2002) Senator for Victoria (1950–1968) | | Minister for Works; Minister for the Interior (to 4 March 1964); Minister in charge of Commonwealth Activities in Education and Research under the Prime Minister |
| Liberal | Hubert Opperman (1904–1996) MP for Corio (1949–1967) | | Minister for Immigration |
| Liberal | Reginald Swartz (1911–2006) MP for Darling Downs (1949–1972) | | Minister for Repatriation (to 22 December 1964); Minister for Health (from 21 November 1964); Minister for Social Services (from 21 January 1965 to 22 February 1965) |
| Liberal | Les Bury (1913–1986) MP for Wentworth (1956–1974) | | Minister for Housing |
| Liberal | James Forbes (1923–2019) MP for Barker (1956–1975) | | Minister for the Army; Minister assisting the Treasurer; Minister for the Navy (to 4 March 1964) |
| Country | Doug Anthony (1929–2020) MP for Richmond (1957–1984) (in Ministry from 4 March 1964) | | Minister for the Interior (from 4 March 1964) |
| Liberal | Fred Chaney (1914–2001) MP for Perth (1955–1969) (in Ministry from 4 March 1964) | | Minister for the Navy (from 4 March 1964) |
| Liberal | Billy Snedden (1926–1987) MP for Bruce (1955–1983) (in Ministry from 4 March 1964) | | Attorney-General (from 4 March 1964) |
| Liberal | Ken Anderson (1909–1985) Senator for New South Wales (1953–1975) (in Ministry from 10 June 1964) | | Minister for Customs and Excise (from 10 June 1964) |
| Liberal | Peter Howson (1919–2009) MP for Fawkner (1955–1969) (in Ministry from 10 June 1964) | | Chief Government Whip in the House (to 10 June 1964); Minister for Air (from 10 June 1964) |
| Country | Colin McKellar (1903–1970) Senator for New South Wales (1958–1970) (in Ministry from 22 December 1964) | | Minister for Repatriation (from 22 December 1964) |
| Country | Ian Sinclair (1929–) MP for New England (1963–1998) (in Ministry from 22 February 1965) | | Minister for Social Services (from 22 February 1965) |
