= McMahon ministry =

46th ministry of government of Australia

- 46th Ministry of Australia

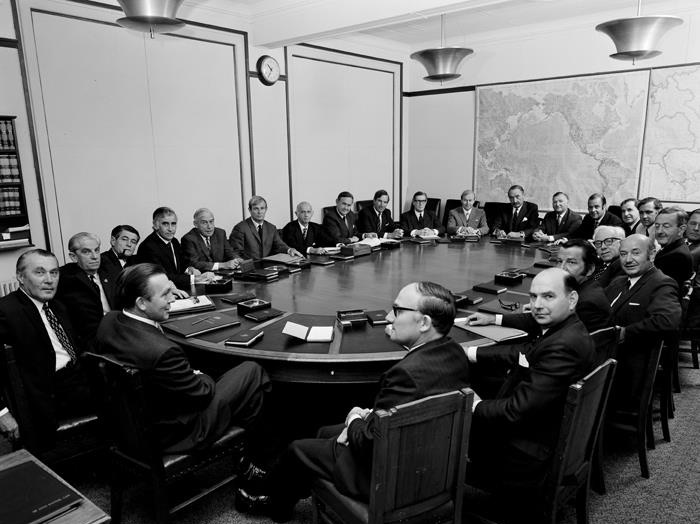
- The McMahon Ministry between March and May 1971.
- Date formed: 10 March 1971
- Date dissolved: 5 December 1972

People and organisations
- Monarch: Elizabeth II
- Governor-General: Sir Paul Hasluck
- Prime Minister: William McMahon
- Deputy Prime Minister: Doug Anthony
- No. of ministers: 33 (plus 6 Assistant Ministers)
- Member party: Liberal–Country coalition
- Status in legislature: Coalition majority government
- Opposition party: Labor
- Opposition leader: Gough Whitlam

History
- Outgoing election: 2 December 1972
- Legislature term: 27th
- Predecessor: Second Gorton ministry
- Successor: First Whitlam ministry

The McMahon ministry (Liberal–Country Coalition) was the 46th ministry of the Australian Government. It was led by the country's 20th Prime Minister, William McMahon. The McMahon ministry succeeded the Second Gorton ministry, which dissolved on 10 March 1971 following the resignation of John Gorton as Prime Minister. The ministry was replaced by the First Whitlam ministry on 5 December 1972 following the federal election that took place on 2 December which saw Labor defeat the Coalition.

As of 1 May 2025, Ian Sinclair is the last surviving member of the McMahon ministry; Sinclair is also the last surviving minister of the Menzies, Holt, McEwen, and Gorton governments, as well as the First Fraser ministries. Tom Hughes was the last surviving Liberal minister, and Malcolm Fraser was the last surviving Liberal Cabinet minister. Tony Street was the last surviving assistant minister.

== Cabinet ==
Party	Minister	Portrait	Portfolio
Liberal	William McMahon (1908–1988) MP for Lowe (1949–1982)		Prime Minister; Leader of the Liberal Party; Minister for Foreign Affairs (to 22 March 1971)
Country	Doug Anthony (1929–2020) MP for Richmond (1957–1984)		Deputy Prime Minister; Leader of the Country Party; Minister for Trade and Industry
Liberal	John Gorton (1911–2002) MP for Higgins (1968–1975)		Deputy Leader of the Liberal Party (to 18 August 1971); Minister for Defence (to 13 August 1971)
Country	Ian Sinclair (born 1929) MP for New England (1963–1998)		Deputy Leader of the Country Party; Minister for Primary Industry
Liberal	Sir Ken Anderson (1909–1985) Senator for New South Wales (1953–1975)		Leader of the Government in the Senate; Minister for Supply (to 2 August 1971); Minister for Health (from 2 August 1971)
Liberal	Sir Reginald Swartz (1911–2006) MP for Darling Downs (1949–1972)		Minister for National Development; Leader of the House (to 15 August 1972)
Liberal	Billy Snedden (1926–1987) MP for Bruce (1955–1983)		Deputy Leader of the Liberal Party (from 18 August 1971); Minister for Labour and National Service (to 22 March 1971); Treasurer (from 22 March 1971)
Liberal	Nigel Bowen (1911–1994) MP for Parramatta (1964–1973)		Minister for Education and Science (to 22 March 1971); Attorney-General (from 22 March 1971 to 2 August 1971); Minister for Foreign Affairs (from 2 August 1971)
Liberal	Sir Alan Hulme (1907–1989) MP for Petrie (1963–1972)		Postmaster-General; Vice-President of the Executive Council
Liberal	Les Bury (1913–1986) MP for Wentworth (1956–1974)		Treasurer (to 22 March 1971); Minister for Foreign Affairs (from 22 March 1971 to 2 August 1971)
Country	Peter Nixon (1928–2025) MP for Gippsland (1961–1983)		Minister for Shipping and Transport
Liberal	David Fairbairn (1917–1994) MP for Farrer (1949–1975) (in Cabinet from 22 March 1971)		Minister for Education and Science (from 22 March 1971 to 20 August 1971); Minister for Defence (from 20 August 1971)
Liberal	Phillip Lynch (1933–1984) MP for Flinders (1966–1982) (in Cabinet from 22 March 1971)		Minister for Immigration (to 22 March 1971); Minister assisting the Treasurer (to 22 March 1971); Minister for Labour and National Service (from 22 March 1971)
Liberal	Malcolm Fraser (1930–2015) MP for Wannon (1955–1983) (in Cabinet from 20 August 1971)		Minister for Education and Science (from 20 August 1971)

== Outer ministry ==
Party	Minister	Portrait	Portfolio
Country	Charles Barnes (1901–1998) MP for McPherson (1958–1972)		Minister for External Territories (to 25 January 1972)
Liberal	James Forbes (1923–2019) MP for Barker (1956–1975)		Minister for Health (to 22 March 1971); Minister for Immigration (from 22 March 1971)
Liberal	Dame Annabelle Rankin (1908–1986) Senator for Queensland (1947–1971)		Minister for Housing (to 22 March 1971)
Liberal	Bill Wentworth (1907–2003) MP for Mackellar (1949–1977)		Minister for Social Services; Minister in charge of Aboriginal Affairs under the Prime Minister (to 31 May 1971)
Liberal	Reg Wright (1905–1990) Senator for Tasmania (1950–1978)		Minister for Works; Minister in charge of Tourist Activities under the Minister for Trade and Industry (to 31 May 1971)
Liberal	Don Chipp (1925–2006) MP for Hotham (1969–1977)		Minister for Customs and Excise; Minister assisting the Minister for National Development (from 27 May 1971); Leader of the House (from 15 August 1972)
Liberal	Bob Cotton (1915–2006) Senator for New South Wales (1965–1978)		Minister for Civil Aviation
Country	Tom Drake-Brockman (1919–1992) Senator for Western Australia (1959–1978)		Minister for Air
Country	Mac Holten (1922–1996) MP for Indi (1958–1977)		Minister for Repatriation
Liberal	Tom Hughes (1923–2024) MP for Berowra (1969–1972)		Attorney-General (to 22 March 1971)
Liberal	James Killen (1925–2007) MP for Moreton (1955–1983)		Minister for the Navy (to 22 March 1971)
Liberal	Andrew Peacock (1939–2021) MP for Kooyong (1966–1994)		Minister for the Army (to 2 February 1972); Minister for External Territories (from 2 February 1972); Minister assisting the Prime Minister (to 25 May 1971); Minister assisting the Treasurer (from 25 May 1971 to 2 February 1972)
Country	Ralph Hunt (1928–2011) MP for Gwydir (1969–1989)		Minister for the Interior
Liberal	Kevin Cairns (1929–1984) MP for Lilley (1963–1972) (in Ministry from 22 March 1971)		Minister for Housing (from 22 March 1971)
Liberal	Ivor Greenwood (1926–1976) Senator for Victoria (1968–1976) (in Ministry from 22 March 1971)		Minister for Health (from 22 March 1971 to 2 August 1971); Attorney-General (from 2 August 1971)
Liberal	Malcolm Mackay (1919–1999) MP for Evans (1963–1972) (in Ministry from 22 March 1971)		Minister for the Navy (from 22 March 1971)
Liberal	Peter Howson (1919–2009) MP for Casey (1969–1972) (in Ministry from 31 May 1971)		Minister for the Environment, Aborigines and the Arts (from 31 May 1971); Minister in charge of Tourist Activities (from 31 May 1971)
Liberal	Victor Garland (1934–2022) MP for Curtin (1969–1981) (in Ministry from 2 August 1971)		Minister for Supply (from 2 August 1971); Minister assisting the Treasurer (from 21 March 1972)
Country	Bob Katter (1918–1990) MP for Kennedy (1966–1990) (in Ministry from 2 February 1972)		Minister for the Army (from 2 February 1972)

== Assistant ministers ==
Party	Minister	Portrait	Portfolio
Liberal	Don Dobie (1927–1996) MP for Cook (1969–1972)		Assistant Minister assisting the Prime Minister (from 20 August 1971)
Liberal	John McLeay (1922–2000) MP for Boothby (1966–1981)		Assistant Minister assisting the Minister for Civil Aviation (from 20 August 1971)
Country	Ian Robinson (1925–2017) MP for Cowper (1963–1984)		Assistant Minister assisting the Postmaster-General (from 20 August 1971)
Liberal	Tony Street (1926-2022) MP for Corangamite (1966–1984)		Assistant Minister assisting the Minister for Labour and National Service (from 20 August 1971)
Liberal	John Marriott (1913–1994) Senator for Tasmania (1953–1975)		Assistant Minister assisting the Minister for Health (from 14 September 1971)
Country	Robert King OBE (1920–1991) MP for Wimmera (1958–1977)		Assistant Minister assisting the Minister for Primary Industry (from 5 October 1971)
