= McEwen ministry =

43rd ministry of government of Australia

- 43rd Ministry of Australia

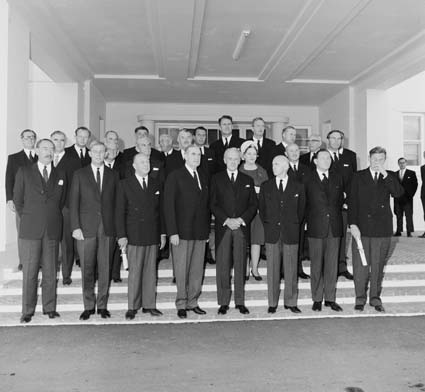
- Governor-General Lord Casey with the newly sworn in McEwen ministry
- Date formed: 19 December 1967
- Date dissolved: 10 January 1968

People and organisations
- Monarch: Elizabeth II
- Governor-General: Lord Casey
- Prime Minister: John McEwen
- No. of ministers: 25
- Member party: Country–Liberal coalition
- Status in legislature: Coalition majority government
- Opposition party: Labor
- Opposition leader: Gough Whitlam

History
- Legislature term: 26th
- Predecessor: Second Holt ministry
- Successor: First Gorton ministry

The McEwen ministry (Country–Liberal Coalition) was the 43rd ministry of the Government of Australia. It was led by the country's 18th prime minister, John McEwen. The McEwen ministry succeeded the Second Holt ministry, which dissolved on 19 December 1967 following the disappearance of former prime minister Harold Holt – the third and most recent occasion where a sitting prime minister died in office. Since McEwen was the head of the Country Party, it was a caretaker ministry until the senior partner in the Coalition, the Liberal Party, could elect a new leader. John Gorton was ultimately elected on 9 January 1968, and he was sworn in as prime minister along with his ministry the following day.

As of 1 May 2025, Ian Sinclair is the last surviving member of the McEwen ministry; Sinclair is also the last surviving minister of the Menzies, Holt, Gorton, and McMahon governments, as well as the First Fraser ministry. James Forbes, who died in 2019, was the last surviving Liberal minister, and Allen Fairhall, who died in 2006, was the last surviving Liberal Cabinet minister.

== Cabinet ==
Party	Minister	Portrait	Portfolio
Country	John McEwen (1900–1980) MP for Murray (1949–1971)		Prime Minister; Leader of the Country Party; Minister for Trade and Industry
Liberal	William McMahon (1908–1988) MP for Lowe (1949–1982)		Deputy Leader of the Liberal Party; Treasurer
Liberal	Paul Hasluck (1905–1993) MP for Curtin (1949–1969)		Minister for External Affairs
Liberal	Allen Fairhall (1909–2006) MP for Paterson (1949–1969)		Minister for Defence
Liberal	Denham Henty (1903–1978) Senator for Tasmania (1950–1968)		Minister for Supply
Liberal	Alan Hulme (1907–1989) MP for Petrie (1963–1972)		Postmaster-General; Vice-President of the Executive Council
Liberal	David Fairbairn (1917–1994) MP for Farrer (1949–1975)		Minister for National Development
Liberal	John Gorton (1911–2002) Senator for Victoria (1950–1968)		Leader of the Liberal Party (from 9 January 1968); Leader of the Government in the Senate; Minister for Education and Science
Liberal	Les Bury (1913–1986) MP for Wentworth (1956–1974)		Minister for Labour and National Service
Country	Doug Anthony (1929–2020) MP for Richmond (1957–1984)		Deputy Leader of the Country Party; Minister for Primary Industry
Country	Ian Sinclair (1929–) MP for New England (1963–1998)		Minister for Social Services; Minister assisting the Minister for Trade and Industry

== Outer ministry ==
Party	Minister	Portrait	Portfolio
Country	Charles Barnes (1901–1998) MP for McPherson (1958–1972)		Minister for Territories
Liberal	Gordon Freeth (1914–2001) MP for Forrest (1949–1969)		Minister for Shipping and Transport
Liberal	Reginald Swartz (1911–2006) MP for Darling Downs (1949–1972)		Minister for Civil Aviation
Liberal	Billy Snedden (1926–1987) MP for Bruce (1955–1983)		Minister for Immigration; Leader of the House
Liberal	James Forbes (1923–2019) MP for Barker (1956–1975)		Minister for Health
Liberal	Peter Howson (1919–2009) MP for Fawkner (1955–1969)		Minister for Air; Minister assisting the Treasurer
Liberal	Ken Anderson (1909–1985) Senator for New South Wales (1953–1975)		Minister for Customs and Excise
Country	Colin McKellar (1903–1970) Senator for New South Wales (1958–1970)		Minister for Repatriation
Liberal	Dame Annabelle Rankin (1908–1986) Senator for Queensland (1947–1971)		Minister for Housing
Liberal	Malcolm Fraser (1930–2015) MP for Wannon (1955–1983)		Minister for the Army
Liberal	Nigel Bowen (1911–1994) MP for Parramatta (1964–1973)		Attorney-General
Liberal	Don Chipp (1925–2006) MP for Higinbotham (1960–1969)		Minister for the Navy; Minister in charge of Tourist Activities under the Minister for Trade and Industry
Liberal	Bert Kelly (1912–1997) MP for Wakefield (1958–1977)		Minister for Works
Country	Peter Nixon (1928–2025) MP for Gippsland (1961–1983)		Minister for the Interior

== See also ==
- Page Ministry
- Forde Ministry
