= Second Holt ministry =

42nd ministry of government of Australia

- 42nd Ministry of Australia

- The Second Holt ministry at their swearing-in
- Date formed: 14 December 1966
- Date dissolved: 19 December 1967

People and organisations
- Monarch: Elizabeth II
- Governor-General: Lord Casey
- Prime Minister: Harold Holt
- No. of ministers: 27
- Member party: Liberal–Country coalition
- Status in legislature: Coalition majority government
- Opposition party: Labor
- Opposition leader: Arthur Calwell; Gough Whitlam

History
- Election: 26 November 1966
- Legislature term: 26th
- Predecessor: First Holt ministry
- Successor: McEwen ministry

The Second Holt ministry (Liberal–Country Coalition) was the 42nd ministry of the Government of Australia. It was led by the country's 17th Prime Minister, Harold Holt. The Second Holt ministry succeeded the First Holt ministry, which dissolved on 14 December 1966 following the federal election that took place in November. The ministry was replaced by the caretaker McEwen ministry on 19 December 1967, following the disappearance of Holt.

As of 1 May 2025, Ian Sinclair is the last surviving member of the Second Holt ministry; Sinclair is also the last surviving minister of the Menzies government, the First Holt ministry, and the McEwen, Gorton, and McMahon governments, as well as the First Fraser ministry. James Forbes was the last surviving Liberal minister, and Allen Fairhall was the last surviving Liberal Cabinet minister.

== Cabinet ==
Party	Minister	Portrait	Portfolio
Liberal	Harold Holt (1908–1967) MP for Higgins (1949–1967)		Prime Minister (deceased from 17 December 1967); Leader of the Liberal Party (deceased from 17 December 1967)
Country	John McEwen (1900–1980) MP for Murray (1949–1971)		Leader of the Country Party; Minister for Trade and Industry
Liberal	William McMahon (1908–1988) MP for Lowe (1949–1982)		Deputy Leader of the Liberal Party; Treasurer
Liberal	Paul Hasluck (1905–1993) MP for Curtin (1949–1969)		Minister for External Affairs
Country	Charles Adermann (1896–1979) MP for Fisher (1949–1972)		Minister for Primary Industry (to 16 October 1967)
Liberal	Allen Fairhall (1909–2006) MP for Paterson (1949–1969)		Minister for Defence
Liberal	Denham Henty (1903–1978) Senator for Tasmania (1950–1968)		Leader of the Government in the Senate (to 16 October 1967); Minister for Supply
Liberal	Alan Hulme (1907–1989) MP for Petrie (1963–1972)		Postmaster-General; Vice-President of the Executive Council
Liberal	David Fairbairn (1917–1994) MP for Farrer (1949–1975)		Minister for National Development
Liberal	John Gorton (1911–2002) Senator for Victoria (1950–1968)		Leader of the Government in the Senate (from 16 October 1967); Minister for Works (to 28 February 1967); Minister for Education and Science
Liberal	Les Bury (1913–1986) MP for Wentworth (1956–1974)		Minister for Labour and National Service
Country	Doug Anthony (1929–2020) MP for Richmond (1957–1984)		Deputy Leader of the Country Party; Minister for the Interior (to 16 October 1967); Minister for Primary Industry (from 16 October 1967)
Country	Ian Sinclair (1929–) MP for New England (1963–1998) (in Cabinet from 10 October 1967)		Minister for Social Services; Minister assisting the Minister for Trade and Industry

== Outer ministry ==
Party	Minister	Portrait	Portfolio
Country	Charles Barnes (1901–1998) MP for McPherson (1958–1972)		Minister for Territories
Liberal	Gordon Freeth (1914–2001) MP for Forrest (1949–1969)		Minister for Shipping and Transport
Liberal	Reginald Swartz (1911–2006) MP for Darling Downs (1949–1972)		Minister for Civil Aviation
Liberal	Billy Snedden (1926–1987) MP for Bruce (1955–1983)		Minister for Immigration; Leader of the House (from 21 February 1967)
Liberal	James Forbes (1923–2019) MP for Barker (1956–1975)		Minister for Health
Liberal	Peter Howson (1919–2009) MP for Fawkner (1955–1969)		Minister for Air; Minister assisting the Treasurer
Liberal	Ken Anderson (1909–1985) Senator for New South Wales (1953–1975)		Minister for Customs and Excise
Country	Colin McKellar (1903–1970) Senator for New South Wales (1958–1970)		Minister for Repatriation
Liberal	Dame Annabelle Rankin (1908–1986) Senator for Queensland (1947–1971)		Minister for Housing
Liberal	Malcolm Fraser (1930–2015) MP for Wannon (1955–1983)		Minister for the Army
Liberal	Nigel Bowen (1911–1994) MP for Parramatta (1964–1973)		Attorney-General
Liberal	Don Chipp (1925–2006) MP for Higinbotham (1960–1969)		Minister for the Navy; Minister in charge of Tourist Activities under the Minister for Trade and Industry
Liberal	Bert Kelly (1912–1997) MP for Wakefield (1958–1977) (in Ministry from 28 February 1967)		Deputy Government Whip in the House (to 21 February 1967); Minister for Works (from 28 February 1967)
Country	Peter Nixon (1928–2025) MP for Gippsland (1961–1983) (in Ministry from 16 October 1967)		Minister for the Interior (from 16 October 1967)
