= First Holt ministry =

41st ministry of government of Australia

- 41st Ministry of Australia

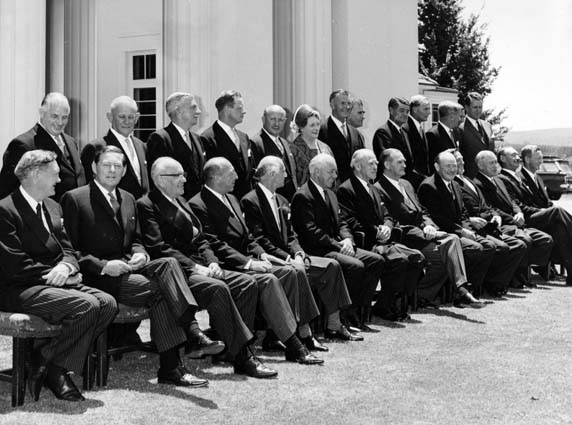
- The First Holt ministry at their swearing-in
- Date formed: 26 January 1966
- Date dissolved: 14 December 1966

People and organisations
- Monarch: Elizabeth II
- Governor-General: Lord Casey
- Prime Minister: Harold Holt
- No. of ministers: 25
- Member party: Liberal–Country coalition
- Status in legislature: Coalition majority government
- Opposition party: Labor
- Opposition leader: Arthur Calwell

History
- Outgoing election: 26 November 1966
- Legislature term: 25th
- Predecessor: Tenth Menzies ministry
- Successor: Second Holt ministry

The First Holt Ministry (Liberal–Country Coalition) was the 41st ministry of the Government of Australia. It was led by the country's 17th Prime Minister, Harold Holt. The First Holt ministry succeeded the Tenth Menzies ministry, which dissolved on 26 January 1966 following the retirement of former Prime Minister Sir Robert Menzies. The ministry was replaced by the Second Holt ministry on 14 December 1966 following the 1966 federal election.

As of 20 December 2020, Ian Sinclair is the last surviving member of the First Holt ministry; Sinclair is also the last surviving minister of the Menzies government, the Second Holt ministry, and the McEwen, Gorton, and McMahon governments, as well as the First Fraser ministry. James Forbes was the last surviving Liberal minister, and Allen Fairhall and Charles Barnes were the last surviving Liberal and Country Cabinet ministers respectively.

== Cabinet ==
Party	Minister	Portrait	Portfolio
Liberal	Harold Holt (1908–1967) MP for Higgins (1949–1967)		Prime Minister; Leader of the Liberal Party
Country	John McEwen (1900–1980) MP for Murray (1949–1971)		Leader of the Country Party; Minister for Trade and Industry
Liberal	William McMahon (1908–1988) MP for Lowe (1949–1982)		Deputy Leader of the Liberal Party; Treasurer
Liberal	Paul Hasluck (1905–1993) MP for Curtin (1949–1969)		Minister for External Affairs
Country	Charles Adermann (1896–1979) MP for Fisher (1949–1972)		Deputy Leader of the Country Party (to 10 December 1966); Minister for Primary Industry
Liberal	Allen Fairhall (1909–2006) MP for Paterson (1949–1969)		Minister for Defence
Liberal	Denham Henty (1903–1978) Senator for Tasmania (1950–1968)		Leader of the Government in the Senate; Minister for Supply
Liberal	Alan Hulme (1907–1989) MP for Petrie (1963–1972)		Postmaster-General; Vice-President of the Executive Council
Liberal	David Fairbairn (1917–1994) MP for Farrer (1949–1975)		Minister for National Development; Leader of the House (to October 1966)
Country	Charles Barnes (1901–1998) MP for McPherson (1958–1972)		Minister for Territories
Liberal	John Gorton (1911–2002) Senator for Victoria (1950–1968)		Minister for Works; Minister in charge of Commonwealth Activities in Education and Research under the Prime Minister
Liberal	Les Bury (1913–1986) MP for Wentworth (1956–1974)		Minister for Labour and National Service

== Outer ministry ==
Party	Minister	Portrait	Portfolio
Liberal	Gordon Freeth (1914–2001) MP for Forrest (1949–1969)		Minister for Shipping and Transport
Liberal	Reginald Swartz (1911–2006) MP for Darling Downs (1949–1972)		Minister for Civil Aviation
Liberal	Hubert Opperman (1904–1996) MP for Corio (1949–1967)		Minister for Immigration
Liberal	Billy Snedden (1926–1987) MP for Bruce (1955–1983)		Attorney-General
Liberal	Dr James Forbes (1923–2019) MP for Barker (1956–1975)		Minister for Health
Country	Doug Anthony (1929–2020) MP for Richmond (1957–1984)		Minister for the Interior
Liberal	Fred Chaney (1914–2001) MP for Perth (1955–1969)		Minister for the Navy
Liberal	Peter Howson (1919–2009) MP for Fawkner (1955–1969)		Minister for Air; Minister assisting the Treasurer
Liberal	Ken Anderson (1909–1985) Senator for New South Wales (1953–1975)		Minister for Customs and Excise
Country	Colin McKellar (1903–1970) Senator for New South Wales (1958–1970)		Minister for Repatriation
Country	Ian Sinclair (1929–) MP for New England (1963–1998)		Minister for Social Services
Liberal	Dame Annabelle Rankin (1908–1986) Senator for Queensland (1947–1971)		Chief Government Whip in the Senate (to 8 March 1966); Minister for Housing
Liberal	Malcolm Fraser (1930–2015) MP for Wannon (1955–1983)		Minister for the Army
