= Holt Ministry =

Holt Ministry may refer to:

- First Holt Ministry
- Second Holt Ministry
