= Holt government =

Government of Australia, 1966–67

Holt government

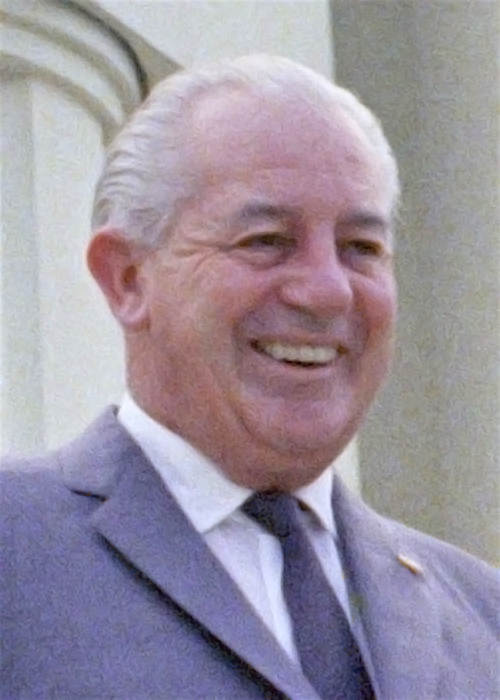

In office
- 26 January 1966 – 19 December 1967
- Monarch: Elizabeth II
- Prime Minister: Harold Holt
- Deputy: John McEwen
- Parties: Liberal; Country
- Origin: Holt wins 1966 Liberal leadership election
- Demise: Holt disappears, presumed drowned
- Predecessor: Menzies government (II)
- Successor: McEwen government

The Holt government was the federal executive government of Australia led by Prime Minister Harold Holt. It was made up of members of a Liberal-Country Party coalition in the Australian Parliament from 26 January 1966 to 19 December 1967. Holt governed until his unexpected death while swimming in rough surf in 1967.

The Holt Government was responsible for significant reforms, including Decimalisation of Australia's currency and the 1967 Referendum that removed provisions of the Australian Constitution that discriminated against Indigenous Australians. Holt also presided over increasing Australian trade links with Asia and expansion of Australia's commitment to defending South Vietnam during the Vietnam War.

== Background ==
The Liberal Party of Australia-Country Party of Australia coalition had governed in Australia since 1949 under Prime Minister Robert Menzies. Menzies retired in January 1966, ending the Second Menzies Government, and the Liberal Party elected Harold Holt as party leader and he became Prime Minister of Australia.

Holt was sworn in as prime minister on 26 January 1966. He had entered Parliament in 1935, serving as minister in the First Menzies Government from 1939-1941 and in the Second Menzies Government from 1949 to 1966, including seven years as treasurer, and a decade as Deputy Liberal Leader.

== Terms in office ==
Holt was sworn in as prime minister on 26 January 1966, following the retirement of Robert Menzies six days earlier. He won the leadership election unopposed, with William McMahon elected as his deputy. He went on the lead the coalition to victory in the November 1966 Australian Federal Election against the Australian Labor Party opposition led by Arthur Calwell.

On 26 November 1966, Holt fought his first and only general election as prime minister, winning a landslide victory. The Coalition secured 56.9 percent of the two-party-preferred vote, gaining 10 seats and bringing its total number of seats in the House of Representatives to 82 out of 124, the largest majority government in Australian history at the time. The Liberals finished only two seats away from forming majority government in its own right. It was a higher margin of victory than Menzies had achieved in eight elections as Liberal leader, and was the Labor Party's worst electoral defeat in 31 years.

External videos
- Newsreel footage of the 1966 election from Pathé News

Following the 1966 election, Gough Whitlam replaced Arthur Calwell as Leader of the Opposition.

=== Holt's ministries ===
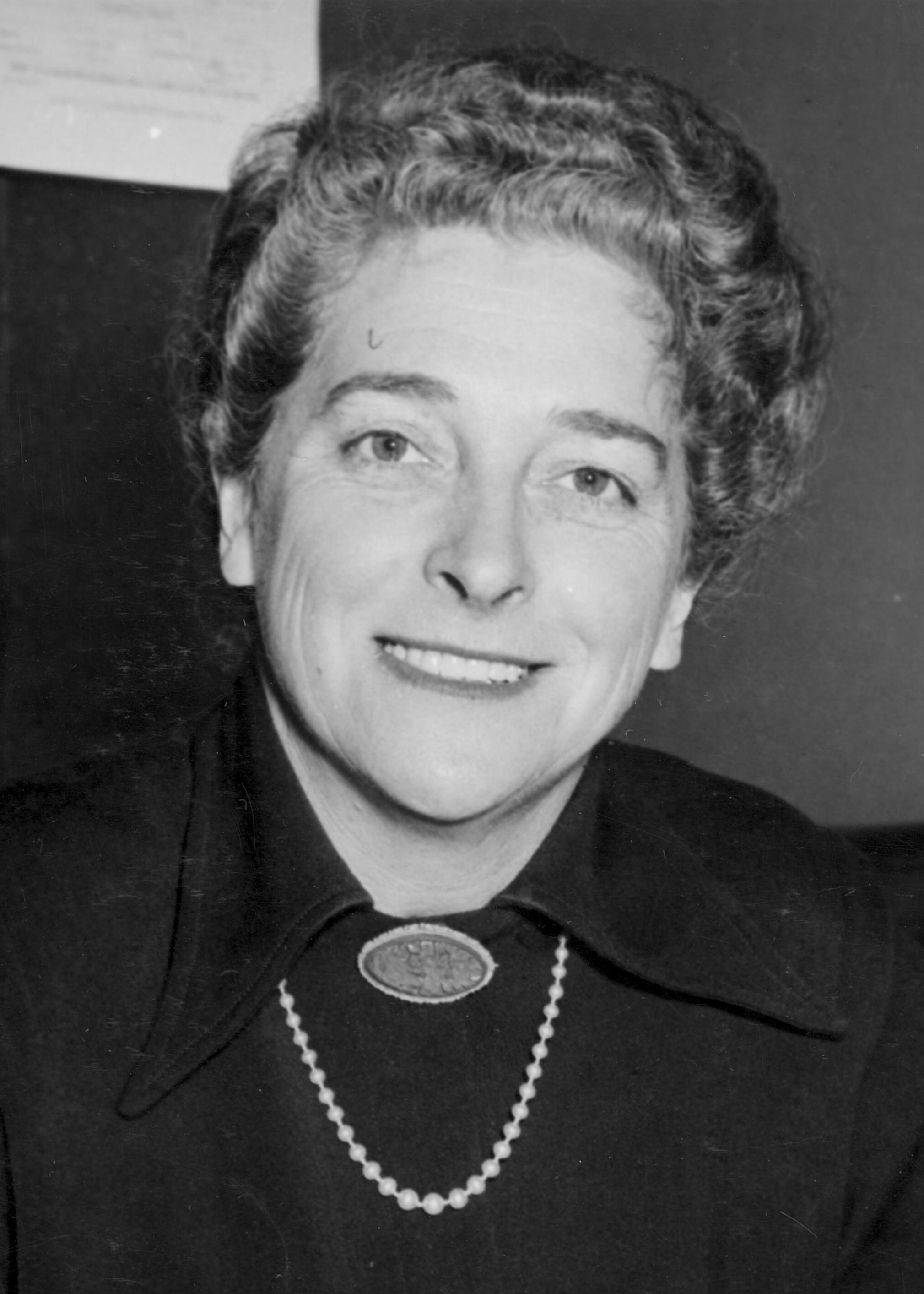
Senator Annabelle Rankin became the first female minister in Australian history following her appointment to the First Holt Ministry

The First Holt Ministry contained few changes from the last Menzies ministry, but had some notable appointments, with future Prime Minister Malcolm Fraser becoming Minister for the Army, and Senator Annabelle Rankin becoming Minister for Housing - the first woman to hold a ministerial portfolio. (Note: Enid Lyons had served in cabinet from 1949 to 1951, but only as Vice-President of the Executive Council, a largely honorific post that did not have its own department.) In cabinet, John Gorton and Les Bury were promoted to replace the retiring Menzies and the deceased Shane Paltridge, and Billy McMahon was promoted to Treasurer in place of Holt. The Country Party leader John McEwen remained de facto Deputy Prime Minister.

A minor reshuffle occurred after the 1966 election, with the Second Holt ministry having Doug Anthony and Ian Sinclair added to cabinet and Charles Barnes demoted to the outer ministry. The only new government department created during Holt's tenure was the Department of Education and Science, established in December 1966, which was the first federal department specific to either of those areas.

== Defence and foreign policy ==
During his time in office, Holt increased Australian commitment to the growing War in Vietnam. His government oversaw conversion to decimal currency. Holt faced Britain's withdrawal from Asia by visiting and hosting many Asian leaders and by expanding ties to the United States, hosting the first visit to Australia by an American president, his friend Lyndon Johnson. By the end of 1967, the Liberals' initially popular support for the war in Vietnam was causing increasing public protest.

== Domestic policy ==
=== Immigration ===
Holt's government introduced the Migration Act 1966, which effectively dismantled the White Australia Policy and increased access to non-European migrants, including refugees fleeing the Vietnam War.

=== Indigenous affairs ===
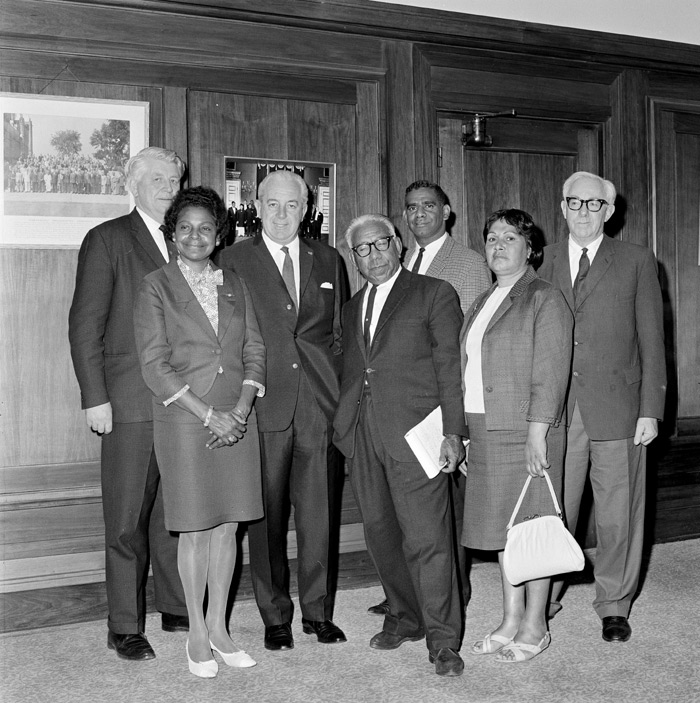
Gordon Bryant (left), prime minister Harold Holt (third from left) and Bill Wentworth (right) meeting with FCAATSI representatives – from left to right, Faith Bandler, Douglas Nicholls, Burnum Burnum and Winnie Branson.

In 1967, the Holt government amended the constitution to alter section 51 (xxvi) and remove section 127. This gave the federal government the power to legislate specifically for Indigenous Australians, and also mandated counting Indigenous people in the census. The constitutional amendments required a referendum before they could be enacted, which passed with over 90 percent of the vote; it remains the largest referendum majority in Australian history.

Following the success of the referendum, Holt toured Aboriginal communities and consulted with indigenous leaders, including Charles Perkins and Kath Walker. In September 1967, Holt outlined his policy for Aborigines, including the establishment of an Office of Aboriginal Affairs under the prime ministers' control, and continuance of the government's goal of "assimilation", which he said would not mean losing Aboriginal identity or pride in their culture or an objective of eliminating Aboriginal physical features, but rather "Assimilation means that Aborigines can be similar to other citizens, not of course in looks but with regard to all the privileges and responsibilities of citizenship."

Our aim is to help the Aborigines to become an integral part of the our Australian community life... Last year the Commonwealth and the States spent $21 million specifically on Aboriginal advancement and this year the figure will be higher [up from just $500,000 in 1944]... In a legal and a formal sense, none of the opportunities open to all Australians generally are closed to Aborigines. What is needed in many cases is [not money but] help which will equip the Aborigines, by education and in every possible way... to avail themselves of those opportunities.

— Harold Holt, Sept 1967

In November, Holt announced the formation of the Council for Aboriginal Affairs to be chaired by Reserve Bank of Australia Governor H. C. Coombs. Following Holt's death in December, it was left to the Gorton Government to appoint Bill Wentworth as the first Minister in charge of Aboriginal Affairs under the Prime Minister.

=== Territories ===
Territories minister Charles Barnes announced in October 1967 that "full and unqualified independence" would be granted to Nauru, a United Nations trust territory administered by Australia since 1914. A final round of negotiations held in Canberra in April 1967 had resulted in the Australian government agreeing to full political independence and a staged transition to Nauruan ownership of BPC assets. The Nauru Island Phosphate Industry Agreement was signed in June 1967.

The Nauru Independence Act 1967 received royal assent in November 1967. Independence was not proclaimed until January 1968, following Holt's death.

== Death of Holt ==
On 17 December 1967, Holt disappeared in heavy surf while swimming off Cheviot Beach, near Melbourne, becoming the third Australian prime minister to die in office. He was not formally declared missing until 19 December. Country Party leader John McEwen served as prime minister from 19 December 1967 to 10 January 1968, pending the election of a new leader of the Liberal Party of Australia. McEwen ruled out maintaining the coalition if deputy liberal leader William McMahon became prime minister. John Gorton won the leadership election with a small majority and resigned from the Senate to stand for election to Higgins, the House of Representatives seat formerly held by Harold Holt, which he achieved on 24 February 1968.

== See also ==
- History of Australia
- History of Australia since 1945
- First Holt Ministry
- Second Holt Ministry
