= 1956 Wentworth by-election =

A by-election was held for the Australian House of Representatives seat of Wentworth on 8 December 1956. This was triggered by the resignation of Liberal Party MP Eric Harrison.

The by-election was narrowly won by Liberal Party candidate Les Bury. His final opponent on the two-party-preferred vote, after overtaking the Labor candidate on preferences, was Reg Robson, brother of recently deposed state Liberal leader Murray Robson. Murray Robson supported his brother during the campaign, and it was reported that there was "some talk of expelling" Robson from the party for his role.

== Results ==
Wentworth by-election, 1956
Party	Candidate	Votes	%	±%
Liberal	Les Bury	13,956	41.3	−30.7
Labor	Kevin Starr	6,455	19.1	+19.1
Independent Liberal	Reg Robson	6,414	19.0	+19.0
Independent Liberal	Reg Bartley	4,109	12.2	+12.2
Independent	Cecil Sindel	1,470	4.3	+4.3
Independent Liberal	Alan Laing	1,414	4.2	+4.2
Total formal votes		33,818	97.7	−0.1
Informal votes		1,167	3.3	+0.1
Turnout		34,985	81.5	−10.8
Two-party-preferred result
Liberal	Les Bury	17,460	51.6	−20.4
Independent Liberal	Reg Robson	16,358	48.4	N/A
Liberal hold		Swing	N/A	

== See also ==
- List of Australian federal by-elections
