= Jim Forbes (Australian politician) =

Australian politician (1923–2019)

The Honourable Dr Jim Forbes CMG, MC
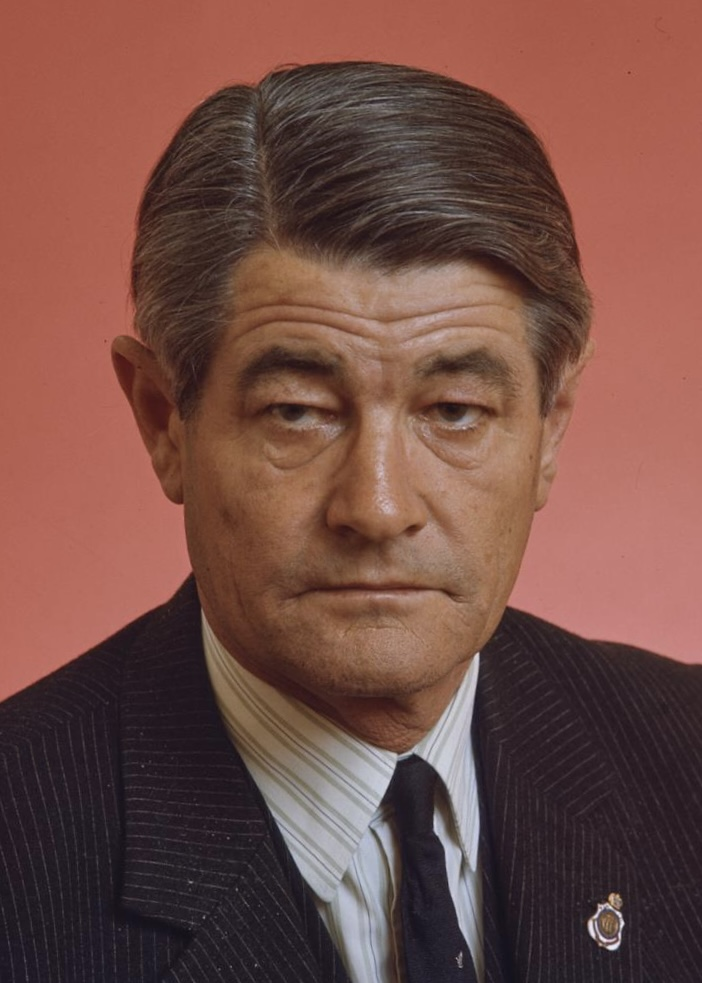
- Forbes in 1974

Minister for Immigration
- In office 22 March 1971 – 5 December 1972
- Prime Minister: William McMahon
- Preceded by: Phillip Lynch
- Succeeded by: Lance Barnard

Minister for Health
- In office 26 January 1966 – 22 March 1971
- Prime Minister: Harold Holt; John McEwen; John Gorton; William McMahon
- Preceded by: Reginald Swartz
- Succeeded by: Ivor Greenwood

Minister for the Army
- In office 18 December 1963 – 26 January 1966
- Prime Minister: Robert Menzies
- Preceded by: John Cramer
- Succeeded by: Malcolm Fraser

Minister for the Navy
- In office 18 December 1963 – 4 March 1964
- Prime Minister: Robert Menzies
- Preceded by: John Gorton
- Succeeded by: Fred Chaney

President of the Liberal Party of Australia
- In office 15 May 1982 – 16 July 1985
- Leader: Malcolm Fraser; Andrew Peacock
- Preceded by: Sir John Atwill
- Succeeded by: John Valder

President of the South Australian Liberal Party
- In office 13 November 1979 – 1982
- Leader: Dr. David Tonkin
- Preceded by: John Olsen
- Succeeded by: Don Laidlaw

Member of the Australian Parliament for Barker
- In office 13 October 1956 – 11 November 1975
- Preceded by: Archie Cameron
- Succeeded by: James Porter

Personal details
- Born: Alexander James de Burgh Forbes; 16 December 1923 Hobart, Tasmania, Australia
- Died: 10 August 2019 (aged 95) Adelaide, South Australia, Australia
- Party: Liberal
- Spouse: Margaret Blackburn (m. 1952)
- Relations: Arthur Blackburn (father-in-law)
- Education: Royal Military College, Duntroon; University of Adelaide; Magdalen College, Oxford

Military service
- Allegiance: Australia
- Branch/service: Australian Army
- Years of service: 1940–1947
- Rank: Lieutenant
- Unit: 2nd Australian Mountain Battery
- Battles/wars: Second World War
- Awards: Military Cross

Alexander James de Burgh Forbes CMG MC (16 December 1923 – 10 August 2019), often known as A. J. Forbes, was an Australian politician. He served in the House of Representatives from 1956 to 1975 as a member of the Liberal Party, representing the Division of Barker in South Australia. He held ministerial office in the Coalition governments of the 1960s and 1970s, serving as Minister for the Navy (1963–1964), Army (1963–1966), Health (1966–1971), and Immigration (1971–1972). At his death, Forbes was the last surviving Liberal minister who served in the ministries of Sir Robert Menzies, Harold Holt and John McEwen, as well as the First Gorton Ministry.

== Early life and military service ==
Forbes was born on 16 December 1923 in Hobart, the son of Brigadier Alexander Moore Forbes. He was educated on the Australian mainland, at Knox Grammar School in Sydney and at St Peter's College in Adelaide. Having graduated from the Royal Military College, Duntroon, in 1942, he was commissioned into the Australian Army. He was stationed in Darwin in 1943, then assigned to the 2nd Mountain Battery. On 24 April 1945, Forbes was awarded the Military Cross (MC) in recognition of gallant and distinguished service in the South West Pacific. There was a dynastic tradition of exceptional military courage: his father had also won the MC during the First World War, and his brother Patrick Forbes later won the award during the Korean War, "the only known instance of three members of an Australian family winning similar decorations for bravery in three consecutive wars".

Following the end of the Second World War, Forbes was part of Australia's victory contingent in the London Victory Celebrations of 1946. After his discharge from the army in 1947, he studied at the University of Adelaide where he completed a Bachelor of Arts (Hons.) degree in 1950. He then undertook postgraduate studies in political science at Magdalen College, Oxford, where he was awarded a PhD in 1954. His thesis was titled The Attitude of the Dominions to Security and Welfare, 1939–45. Upon his return to Australia he lectured in political science at the University of Adelaide. He married Margaret Blackburn, the daughter of Victoria Cross recipient Brigadier Arthur Blackburn, in 1952 at St Peter-in-the-East, Oxford. They had five children together.

== Politics ==
=== Early career ===
Forbes was president of the Mount Lofty branch of the Liberal and Country League from 1948 to 1951, as well as the founding president of the Adelaide University Liberal Union. He first stood for parliament at the 1955 federal election, aged 31, losing to the incumbent Australian Labor Party (ALP) member Pat Galvin in the seat of Kingston. The following year, he won the Liberal nomination at a by-election for the much friendlier seat of Barker caused by the death of Speaker Archie Cameron. He held the seat of Barker until his retirement in 1975.

In parliament, Forbes became part of the "Oxbridge group", the name given by journalists to a set of "outspoken" Liberal backbenchers who had studied at Oxford and Cambridge. The other members were Les Bury, Harry Turner, and Bill Wentworth; Bury and Forbes were particularly close.

=== Ministerial career ===
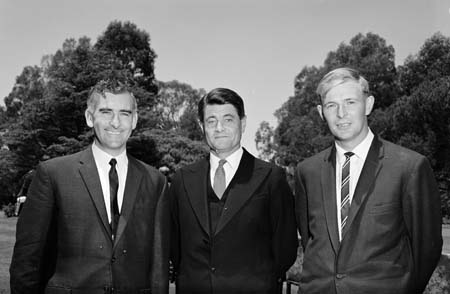
Forbes with Billy Snedden and Doug Anthony in 1963

After the 1963 election, Forbes was elevated to the ministry as Minister for the Army in the Menzies Government. He was also appointed Minister for the Navy on a temporary basis, in the expectation that Fred Chaney would take over once parliament approved an enlargement of the ministry; this occurred in March 1964. The Melbourne–Voyager collision occurred during his tenure, although he was not held responsible. As army minister in the lead-up to the Vietnam War, Forbes successfully advocated for a selective national service scheme as a way of solving the army's manpower problems. This became the National Service Act 1964, and was a compromise between universal conscription and a military reliant upon volunteers. In 2014, he recalled "More than any other person, I had been responsible for persuading Cabinet that they should introduce this scheme. It was the right decision. [...] It was never terribly popular but it was a very fair system and I had to take the burden for that."

After the retirement of Robert Menzies in January 1966, Forbes was appointed Minister for Health in the Holt government. He made the controversial decision to close the government-owned Canberra Abattoir, the announcement of which in March 1969 prompted the resignation of the entire Australian Capital Territory Advisory Council. The abattoir was sold to private owners in June 1969. Forbes also made the decision to ban the importation into Australia of cheese made from unpasteurised milk, based on advice from the National Health and Medical Research Council. This also proved controversial, and the ban was deferred twice. Forbes retained the health ministry in the Gorton government and was tasked with implementing the government's national health scheme, based on the recommendations of the Nimmo Inquiry. The scheme came into effect on 1 January 1970 and provided free health insurance for low-income earners, while maintaining a reliance on private insurance.

In March 1971, William McMahon replaced Gorton as prime minister and Forbes was appointed Minister for Immigration, a title he held until the McMahon government's defeat in the 1972 election. He resisted British pressure to admit ethnically-Asian refugees expelled from Uganda during Idi Amin's regime, stating "Applications by Asians in Uganda will continue to be considered on their individual merits in accordance with our non-European immigration policies. These policies reflect the firm and unshakeable determination of the Government to maintain a homogeneous society in Australia." Forbes also ordered the deportation of musician Joe Cocker in 1972, after a small quantity of cannabis was found by police in his Adelaide hotel room and he was charged with assault following a brawl at a Melbourne pub. In a 2014 interview Forbes stated that, while he accepted responsibility for the decision, he "didn't think it was necessary" and had been pressured by McMahon who believed it would be politically popular.

=== Final years in parliament ===
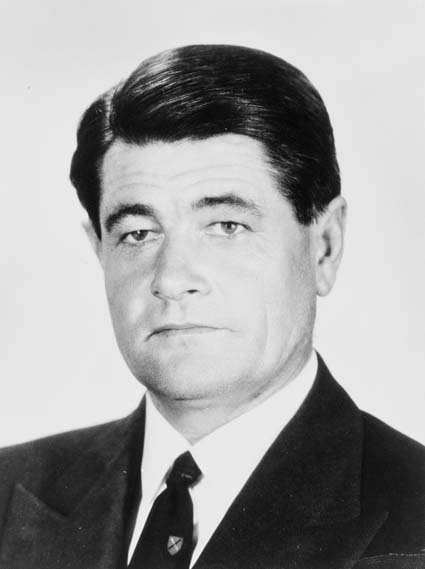
Forbes in 1967

During the November 1973 House of Representatives session, ALP Prime Minister Gough Whitlam accused Forbes of having abused the Government's hospitality by drinking too much at a reception for the visiting New Zealand prime minister Norman Kirk. Forbes demanded that the remark be withdrawn; and Opposition Leader Billy Snedden, for his part, told parliament that Whitlam should be ashamed of himself. Snedden described Whitlam as "gutless". Whitlam responded: "It is what [Forbes] put in his guts that rooted him." Eventually, Whitlam (at the insistence of Speaker James Francis Cope) withdrew the remark, but only after ensuring that it had been transcribed by Hansard's stenographers.

An enraged Forbes followed Whitlam out of the chamber, calling him a "filthy bastard". Whitlam retorted: "Look, he's still shaking." Forbes stated that any shaking was due to sciatica and not alcohol consumption.

In early 1975 Snedden, having failed to defeat Whitlam at the previous year's election, was deposed as Opposition Leader by Malcolm Fraser. Forbes immediately resigned from the frontbench and chose to retire at the next election, having become disillusioned with the internal conflict within the Liberal Party.

== After politics ==
Forbes was chairman of Commonwealth Serum Laboratories from 1978 to 1984. He also served on the council of the National Library of Australia from 1979 to 1985, including as chairman from 1982 to 1985. He maintained an involvement with politics after leaving parliament, and in 1979 was elected South Australian state president of the Liberal Party. In May 1982, Forbes was elected as the party's new federal president, defeating John Herron and Joy Mein to replace Sir John Atwill. He resigned the position in July 1985, delivering a "stern call for unity" in his final address to the party's federal council.

In 2011, 36 years after his retirement from parliament, it was reported that he had spent $16,000 on subsidised flights in the first six months of 2011, charging taxpayers for a total of 29 flights for himself and his family.

Having lived for many years in the Adelaide eastern suburb of St Peters, he died at Calvary Wakefield Hospital, aged 95, on 10 August 2019.

== Awards and honours ==
In 1977, Forbes was made a Companion of the Order of St Michael and St George in recognition of service to the parliament. He was awarded the Centenary Medal in 2001, "for service to the Commonwealth Parliament and as Chairman, Commonwealth Serum Laboratories".

Political offices
Preceded by John Cramer	Minister for the Army; 1963–1966	Succeeded by Malcolm Fraser
Preceded by John Gorton	Minister for the Navy; 1963–1964	Succeeded by Fred Chaney
Preceded by Reginald Swartz	Minister for Health; 1966–1971	Succeeded by Ivor Greenwood
Preceded by Phillip Lynch	Minister for Immigration; 1971–1972	Succeeded by Lance Barnard
Parliament of Australia
Preceded by Archie Cameron	Member for Barker; 1956–1975	Succeeded by James Porter
