= Minister for Housing (Australia) =

Australian cabinet position

- Commonwealth Coat of Arms

- Flag of Australia

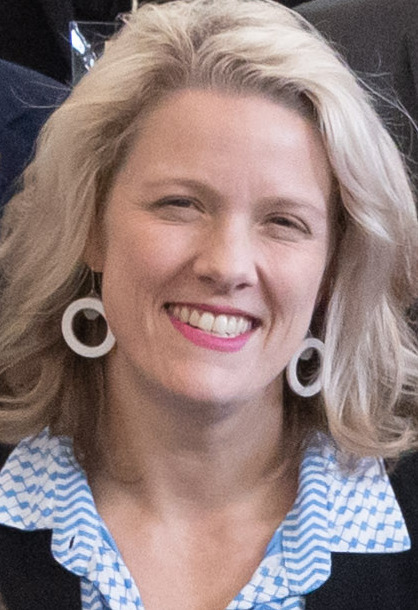
- Incumbent; Clare O'Neil since 29 July 2024
- Department of the Treasury
- Style: The Honourable
- Appointer: Governor-General on the advice of the prime minister
- Inaugural holder: Bert Lazzarini (as Minister for Works and Housing)
- Formation: 13 July 1945
- Website: ministers.treasury.gov.au/ministers/clare-oneil-2025

The Minister for Housing is an Australian Government cabinet position which is currently held by Clare O'Neil since July 2024 in the Albanese government.

In the Government of Australia, the minister administers this portfolio through the Department of the Treasury.

The first Minister for Housing was Les Bury, appointed in 1963, although there were Ministers in charge of War Service Homes from 1932 to 1938 and 1941 to 1945. In 1945, Bert Lazzarini was appointed Minister for Works and Housing and this title continued until 1952, when Wilfrid Kent Hughes became Minister for Works. No minister included "works" or "construction" in his portfolio after Stewart West lost this title in 1987, partly reflecting the progressive outsourcing of the Commonwealth's construction activities and even ownership of assets. The Howard government had no Minister of Housing, partly reflecting the decline of the significance of the commonwealth-state housing agreements as a means of providing new housing since the post-war years.

Between 2010 and 2013 and since 2020, the minister appointed to the position is also appointed the Minister for Homelessness.

== List of ministers for housing ==
The following individuals have been appointed as Minister for Housing, or any of its precedent titles:

Order	Minister	Party	Ministry	Title	Term start	Term end	Term in office
1	Bert Lazzarini	Labor	1st Chifley	Minister for Works and Housing	13 July 1945	1 November 1946	1 year, 111 days
2	Nelson Lemmon	Labor	2nd Chifley	Minister for Works and Housing	1 November 1946	19 December 1949	3 years, 48 days
3	Richard Casey	Liberal	4th Menzies	Minister for Works and Housing	19 December 1949	11 May 1951	1 year, 143 days
4	Wilfrid Kent Hughes	Liberal	5th Menzies	Minister for Works and Housing	11 May 1951	4 June 1952	1 year, 24 days
5	Les Bury	Liberal	10th Menzies	Minister for Housing	18 December 1963	26 January 1966	2 years, 39 days
6	Annabelle Rankin	Liberal	1st Holt; 2nd Holt; McEwen; 1st Gorton; 2nd Gorton; McMahon	Minister for Housing	26 January 1966	22 March 1971	5 years, 55 days
7	Kevin Cairns	Liberal	McMahon	Minister for Housing	22 March 1971	5 December 1972	1 year, 258 days
8	Gough Whitlam^{1}	Labor	1st Whitlam	Minister for Housing	5 December 1972	19 December 1972	14 days
9	Les Johnson	Labor	2nd Whitlam	Minister for Housing	19 December 1972	30 November 1973	2 years, 169 days
9	Les Johnson	Labor	2nd Whitlam; 3rd Whitlam	Minister for Housing and Construction	30 November 1973	6 June 1975	2 years, 169 days
10	Joe Riordan	Labor	3rd Whitlam	Minister for Housing and Construction	6 June 1975	11 November 1975	158 days
11	John Carrick	Liberal	1st Fraser	Minister for Housing and Construction	11 November 1975	22 December 1975	41 days
12	Ivor Greenwood	Liberal	2nd Fraser	Minister for Environment, Housing and Community Development	22 December 1975	8 July 1976	199 days
13	Kevin Newman	Liberal	2nd Fraser	Minister for Environment, Housing and Community Development	8 July 1976	20 December 1977	1 year, 165 days
14	Ray Groom	Liberal	3rd Fraser	Minister for Environment, Housing and Community Development	20 December 1977	5 December 1978	2 years, 319 days
14	Ray Groom	Liberal	3rd Fraser	Minister for Housing and Construction	5 December 1978	3 November 1980	2 years, 319 days
15	Tom McVeigh	National Country	4th Fraser	Minister for Housing and Construction	3 November 1980	7 May 1982	1 year, 185 days
16	Chris Hurford	Labor	1st Hawke	Minister for Housing and Construction	11 March 1983	13 December 1984	1 year, 277 days
17	Stewart West	Labor	2nd Hawke	Minister for Housing and Construction	13 December 1984	24 July 1987	2 years, 223 days
18	Peter Morris	Labor	3rd Hawke	Minister for Housing and Aged Care	19 January 1988	15 February 1988	27 days
19	Peter Staples	Labor	3rd Hawke; 4th Hawke	Minister for Housing and Aged Care	15 February 1988	7 May 1990	2 years, 81 days
20	Brian Howe	Labor	4th Hawke	Minister for Community Services and Health	7 May 1990	7 June 1991	5 years, 309 days
20	Brian Howe	Labor	4th Hawke; 1st Keating	Minister for Health, Housing and Community Services	7 June 1991	24 March 1993	5 years, 309 days
20	Brian Howe	Labor	2nd Keating	Minister for Housing, Local Government and Community Services	24 March 1993	23 December 1993	5 years, 309 days
20	Brian Howe	Labor	2nd Keating	Minister for Housing, Local Government and Human Services	23 December 1993	25 March 1994	5 years, 309 days
20	Brian Howe	Labor	2nd Keating	Minister for Housing and Regional Development	25 March 1994	11 March 1996	5 years, 309 days
21	Tanya Plibersek	Labor	1st Rudd; 1st Gillard	Minister for Housing	3 December 2007	14 September 2010	2 years, 285 days
22	Mark Arbib	Labor	2nd Gillard	Minister for Social Housing and Homelessness	14 September 2010	14 December 2011	1 year, 91 days
23	Robert McClelland	Labor	2nd Gillard	Minister for Housing	14 December 2011	5 March 2012	82 days
24	Brendan O'Connor	Labor	2nd Gillard	Minister for Housing	5 March 2012	4 February 2013	336 days
25	Mark Butler	Labor	2nd Gillard	Minister for Housing and Homelessness	4 February 2013	1 July 2013	147 days
26	Julie Collins	Labor	2nd Rudd	Minister for Housing and Homelessness	1 July 2013	18 September 2013	79 days
27	Michael Sukkar	Liberal	2nd Morrison	Minister for Housing	29 May 2019	23 May 2022	2 years, 359 days
(26)	Julie Collins	Labor	Albanese	Minister for Housing	1 June 2022	29 July 2024	2 years, 58 days
28	Clare O'Neil	Labor	Albanese	Minister for Housing	29 July 2024	Incumbent	2 years, 40 days

Notes

^{1} Whitlam was one of a two-man ministry consisting of himself and Lance Barnard for two weeks until the full ministry was announced.

== List of assistant ministers ==
The following individuals have been appointed as Assistant Minister for Community Housing, Homelessness and Community Services, or any of its precedent titles:

Order	Minister	Party	Ministry	Title	Term start	Term end	Term in office
1	Herbert Johnson	Labor	1st Chifley	Minister assisting the Minister for Works and Housing	13 July 1945	1 November 1946	1 year, 111 days
2	Gary Johns	Labor	1st Keating	Parliamentary Secretary to the Minister for Health, Housing and Community Services	27 December 1991	24 March 1993	1 year, 87 days
3	Andrew Theophanous	Labor	2nd Keating	Parliamentary Secretary to the Minister for Housing, Local Government and Human Services	24 March 1993	23 December 1993	1 year, 1 day
3	Andrew Theophanous	Labor	2nd Keating	Parliamentary Secretary to the Minister for Housing, Local Government and Human Services	23 December 1993	25 March 1994	1 year, 1 day
4	Mary Crawford	Labor	2nd Keating	Parliamentary Secretary to the Minister for Housing and Regional Development	25 March 1994	11 March 1996	1 year, 352 days
5	Melissa Parke	Labor	2nd Gillard	Parliamentary Secretary for Homelessness and Social Housing	4 February 2013	1 July 2013	147 days
6	Doug Cameron	Labor	2nd Rudd	Parliamentary Secretary for Housing and Homelessness	1 July 2013	18 September 2013	79 days
7	Sarah Henderson	Liberal	1st Morrison	Assistant Minister for Social Services, Housing and Disability Services	28 August 2018	29 May 2019	274 days
8	Luke Howarth	Liberal National	2nd Morrison	Assistant Minister for Community Housing, Homelessness and Community Services	29 May 2019	22 December 2020	1 year, 207 days

== See also ==
- Minister for Housing (Victoria)
- Minister for Housing (New South Wales)
- Minister for Housing (Western Australia)
