= Harrie Wade =

Australian politician (1905–1964)

The Honourable Harrie Wade OBE
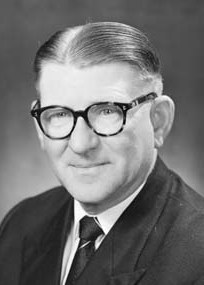

Minister for Health
- In office 22 December 1961 – 18 November 1964
- Prime Minister: Robert Menzies
- Preceded by: Donald Cameron
- Succeeded by: Reg Swartz

Minister for Air
- In office 29 December 1960 – 22 December 1961
- Prime Minister: Robert Menzies
- Preceded by: Frederick Osborne
- Succeeded by: Les Bury

Senator for Victoria
- In office 1 July 1956 – 18 November 1964
- Succeeded by: James Webster

Personal details
- Born: 10 January 1905 Clear Lake, Victoria, Australia
- Died: 18 November 1964 (aged 59) Horsham, Victoria, Australia
- Party: Country
- Spouse: Olive May Newton
- Occupation: Farmer, teacher

Harrie Walter Wade OBE (10 January 1905 – 18 November 1964) was an Australian politician. He was a member of the Country Party and served as a Senator for Victoria from 1956 until his death in 1964. He was the party's Senate leader and held ministerial office in the Menzies Government as Minister for Air (1960–1961) and Minister for Health (1961–1964).

== Early life ==
Wade was born on 10 January 1905 in Clear Lake in the Wimmera region of Victoria. He was the son of Ada Louise (née Edmonds) and Harrie Walter Wade.

Wade was raised on his father's farm and attended the local state primary school and high school in Horsham. After leaving school he worked as a clerk, schoolteacher and accountant for periods. He spent time in Goroke, Victoria, before eventually taking up a farming property in Natimuk.

Wade was elected to the Arapiles Shire Council in 1941 and was elected as shire president in 1948 and 1951. He was the founding president of the Natimuk Bush Fire Brigade and played a key role in organising firefighting efforts during the 1943–44 Victorian bushfire season. In 1945 he unsuccessfully promoted an irrigation scheme for Natimuk Lake.

== Political career ==
Wade joined the United Country Party in 1934. At the 1949 election, he stood for the House of Representatives seat of Wimmera, but it was won by the Liberal candidate, William Lawrence.

At the 1955 federal election, Wade was elected to a six-year Senate term beginning on 1 July 1956. He was re-elected to a second term at the 1961 election.

Wade served on a number of Senate committees in his first term, including on the Joint Statutory Committee on Public Accounts. He spoke on a range of topics, including "the wool and wheat industries, the state of country roads, and the importance of promoting Australian products and developing overseas markets", and supported the creation of the Commonwealth Development Bank to support primary producers. According to his biographer, "the underlying plank of Wade's political philosophy was his belief that Australia’s prosperity, including a flourishing secondary industry, was anchored in a healthy and vibrant primary industry".

Wade was appointed minister for air in the Menzies government on 29 December 1960. He was elected as the Country Party's Senate leader in March 1961. He was later an unsuccessful candidate for the party's deputy leadership in 1963, losing to Charles Adermann after the retirement of Charles Davidson.

=== Health minister, 1961–1964 ===
On 22 December 1961, Wade was appointed minister for health in a ministerial reshuffle that followed the 1961 election. He was promoted to cabinet rank on 18 December 1963.

Wade introduced a number of amendments to the National Health Act 1953 and was described by the Sunraysia Daily as a "pioneer of new health benefits". He supported a voluntary national health insurance scheme as "the most appropriate to our Australian needs and way of life". In January 1963, Wade made a cabinet submission on the health effects of smoking tobacco, including "a detailed report starting with the evidence and statistics supporting the evidence of a link between cigarette smoking and lung cancer". He requested approval from cabinet to implement the National Health and Medical Research Council's recommendations on reducing smoking, but no immediate action was taken.

Wade was health minister during the thalidomide scandal, which caused birth defects in a number of Australian children. Importation of the drug was banned in August 1962, with Wade describing it as a "definite menace to public health", and sales of the drug were not banned in the Australian Capital Territory until October 1962. Thalidomide survivor Lisa McManus was conceived in the period between the manufacturer's withdrawal of the drug in December 1961 and the later bans and in 2019 stated that Wade had failed to heed warnings over its continued presence in Australia.

In response to the Thalidomide scandal, Wade lobbied the state governments to introduce uniform legislation on pharmaceutical products. In 1963 he established an expert committee, the Australian Drug Evaluation Committee, in consultation with the Australian Medical Association and the Royal Australasian College of Physicians. A separate Therapeutic Substances Section was created in the Department of Health in 1963, under the Division of National Health, which has been cited as a predecessor of the later Therapeutic Goods Administration.

== Personal life ==
In 1932, Wade married Olive Newton, with whom he had one son.

In October 1964, Wade suffered a heart attack on his farm and was admitted to Wimmera Base Hospital. He was hospitalised for four weeks before being discharged, but suffered another heart attack at his home and died on 18 November 1964, aged 59. He was granted a state funeral.

Political offices
| Preceded by Frederick Osborne | Minister for Air; 1960–1961 | Succeeded by Les Bury |
| Preceded by Donald Cameron | Minister for Health; 1961–1964 | Succeeded by Reginald Swartz |
