= McMahon government =

1971–1972 Australian federal administration

McMahon government

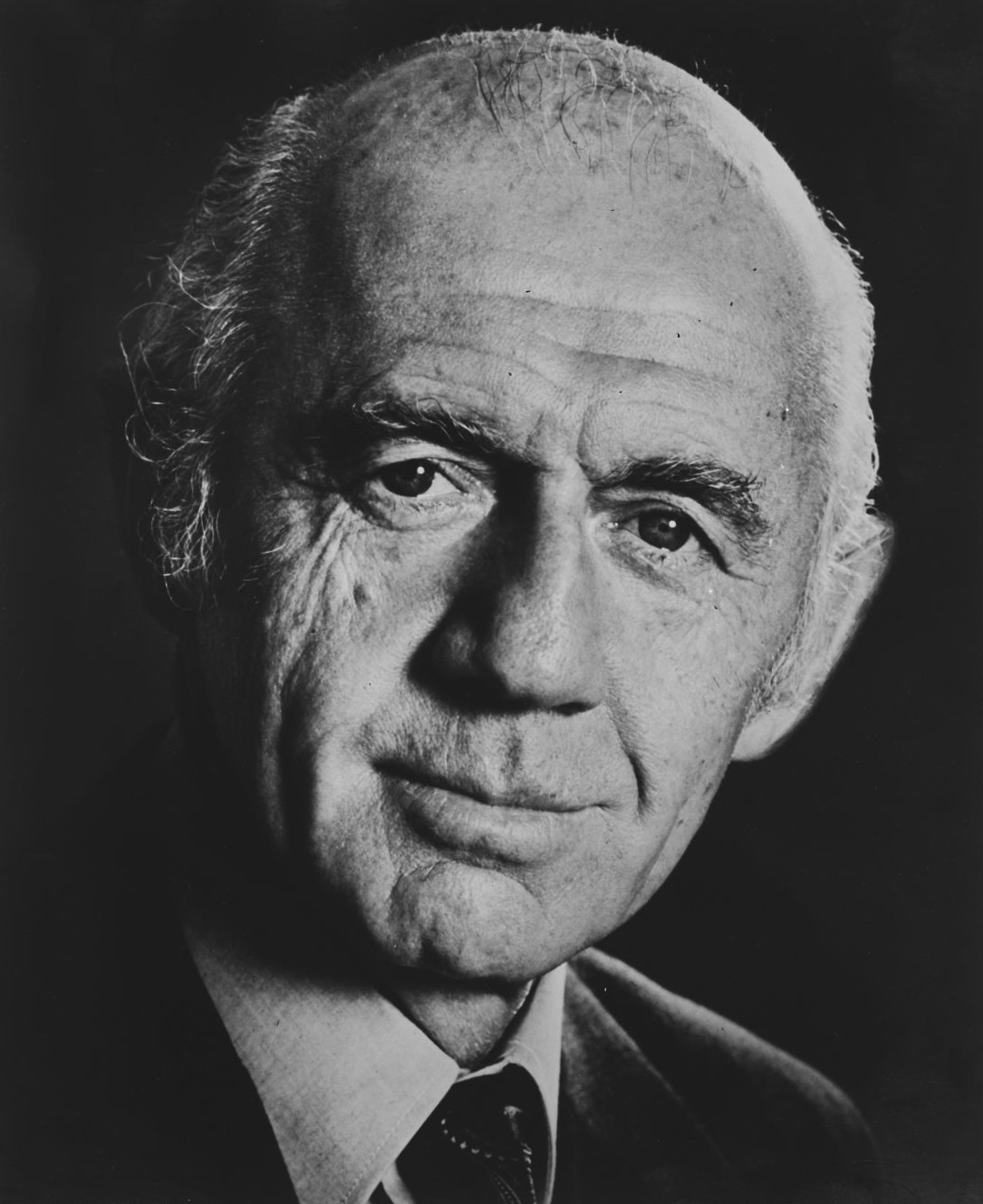

In office
- 10 March 1971 – 5 December 1972
- Monarch: Elizabeth II
- Prime Minister: William McMahon
- Deputy: Doug Anthony
- Parties: Liberal; Country
- Origin: McMahon wins 1971 Liberal leadership election
- Demise: Lost 1972 election
- Predecessor: Gorton government
- Successor: Whitlam government

The McMahon government was the period of federal executive government of Australia led by Prime Minister William McMahon of the Liberal Party. It was made up of members of a coalition between the Liberal Party and the Country Party, led by Doug Anthony as Deputy Prime Minister. The McMahon government lasted from March 1971 to December 1972, being defeated at the 1972 federal election. Writing for the Australian Dictionary of Biography, Julian Leeser describes McMahon's prime ministership as "a blend of cautious innovation and fundamental orthodoxy".

== Background ==
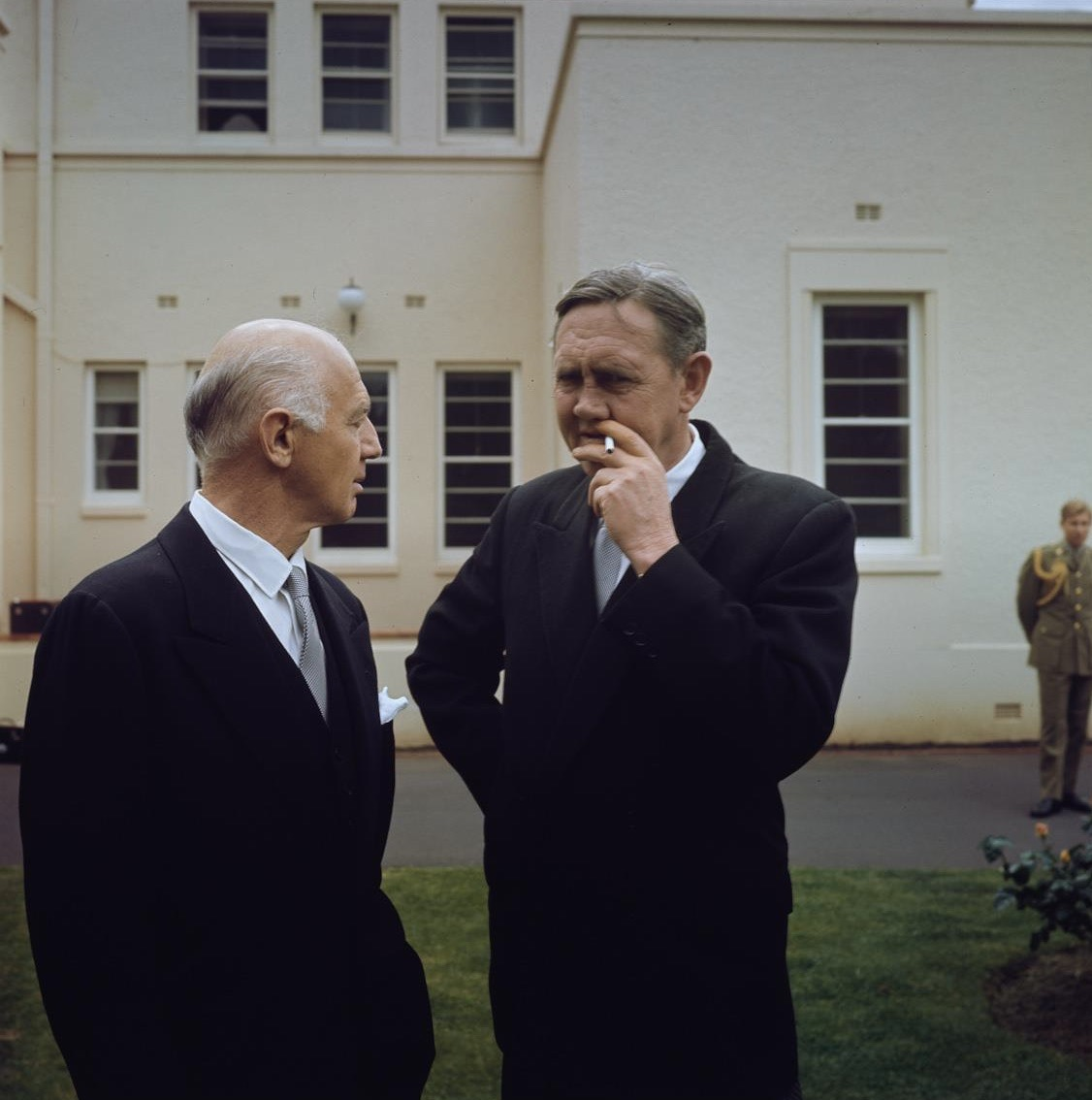
Prime Minister John Gorton with William McMahon shortly after the unsuccessful leadership challenge in 1969

John Gorton became Prime Minister of Australia on 10 January 1968. He was chosen to lead the Liberal Party in place of Harold Holt, who had drowned in rough surf off the Victorian coast. William McMahon was then serving as Deputy Leader of the Liberal Party, but Country Party leader John McEwen ruled out maintaining the Coalition if McMahon became Prime Minister. McMahon as Treasurer had resisted McEwen's support for high levels of protection for manufacturing. Defence and Australia's commitment to the Vietnam War was a prominent issue during the term of the Gorton government; funding for the arts was expanded, rates of pay were standardised between the men and women and the mining industry grew during the period. A policy of economic centralisation led to friction with State leaders and difficulties within the coalition. Gorton departed the office of Prime Minister on 10 March 1971 after a tied Liberal party room vote of confidence in his leadership.

The Liberal-Country Party Coalition had been in office continually since 1949. In April 1967, Gough Whitlam replaced Arthur Calwell as leader of the Labor Party and Leader of the Opposition. Labor reduced the Gorton government's majority and came within four seats of government at the 1969 election; McEwen dropped his veto against McMahon, and McMahon subsequently and unsuccessfully challenged Gorton for the leadership. The government also performed poorly in the 1970 half-Senate election, adding to pressures on Gorton's leadership. Defence minister Malcolm Fraser developed an uneasy relationship with Gorton and in early 1971, Fraser accused Gorton of being disloyal to him in a conflict with Army officials over progress in South Vietnam. On 8 March 1971, Fraser resigned and announced in parliament the following day that Gorton was "not fit to hold the great office of Prime Minister".

On 10 March, the Liberal party room moved to debate and vote on a motion of confidence in Gorton as party leader, resulting in a 33–33 tie. In response Gorton said ‘that is not a vote of confidence’, uniquely exercised his casting vote against himself, and resigned as leader. McMahon replaced Gorton as Prime Minister. Gorton was elected deputy leader. His relations with Fraser did not recover.

William McMahon had joined the Parliament in 1949 and by 1951 had been promoted to Minister for the Navy and for the Air. He had served as a major during the Second World War, and worked on home defence. He served as Minister for Primary Industry (1956–58) and Minister for Labour and National Service (1958–66) in the Menzies government, then as Treasurer (1966–69) in the Holt government and Gorton government, and finally as Minister for External Affairs (1969–71) in the Gorton government. He was married to Sonia McMahon, who maintained a high public profile.

== Term in office ==
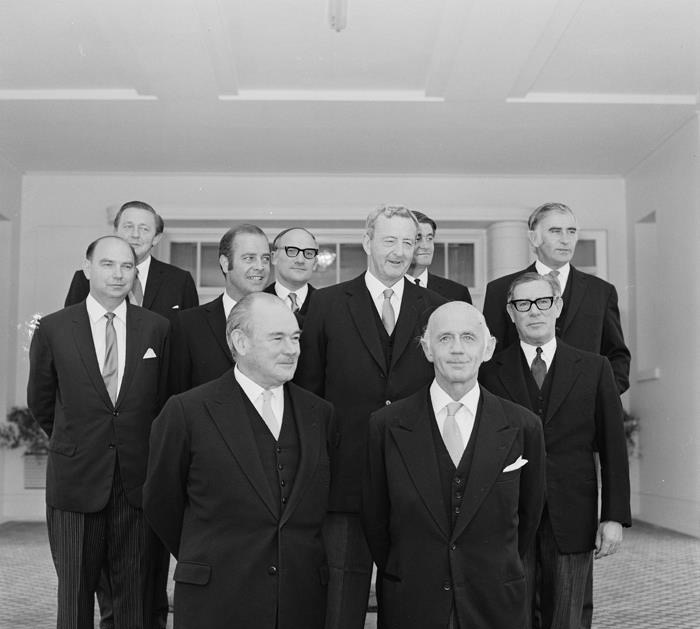
Members of the McMahon Ministry at their swearing-in on 22 March 1971

William "Bill" McMahon became Prime Minister of Australia on 10 March 1971, at the age of 63. The McMahon Ministry was sworn in by Governor-General Paul Hasluck with Country Party leader Doug Anthony as Deputy Prime Minister. McMahon moved Gorton's Treasurer, Leslie Bury to the Ministry for External Affairs and installed Billy Snedden as Treasurer.

After taking office, McMahon told the press in March 1971:

I am a party man. I believe in the Liberal Party and I believe it is the organ by which the national will and conscience will be put into effect.

Disunity continued to affect the government, following the replacement of Gorton. Gorton had taken the senior Cabinet position of Minister for Defence but was forced to resign from Cabinet in August 1971, after McMahon accused him of breaching Cabinet solidarity.

=== Defence Policy ===
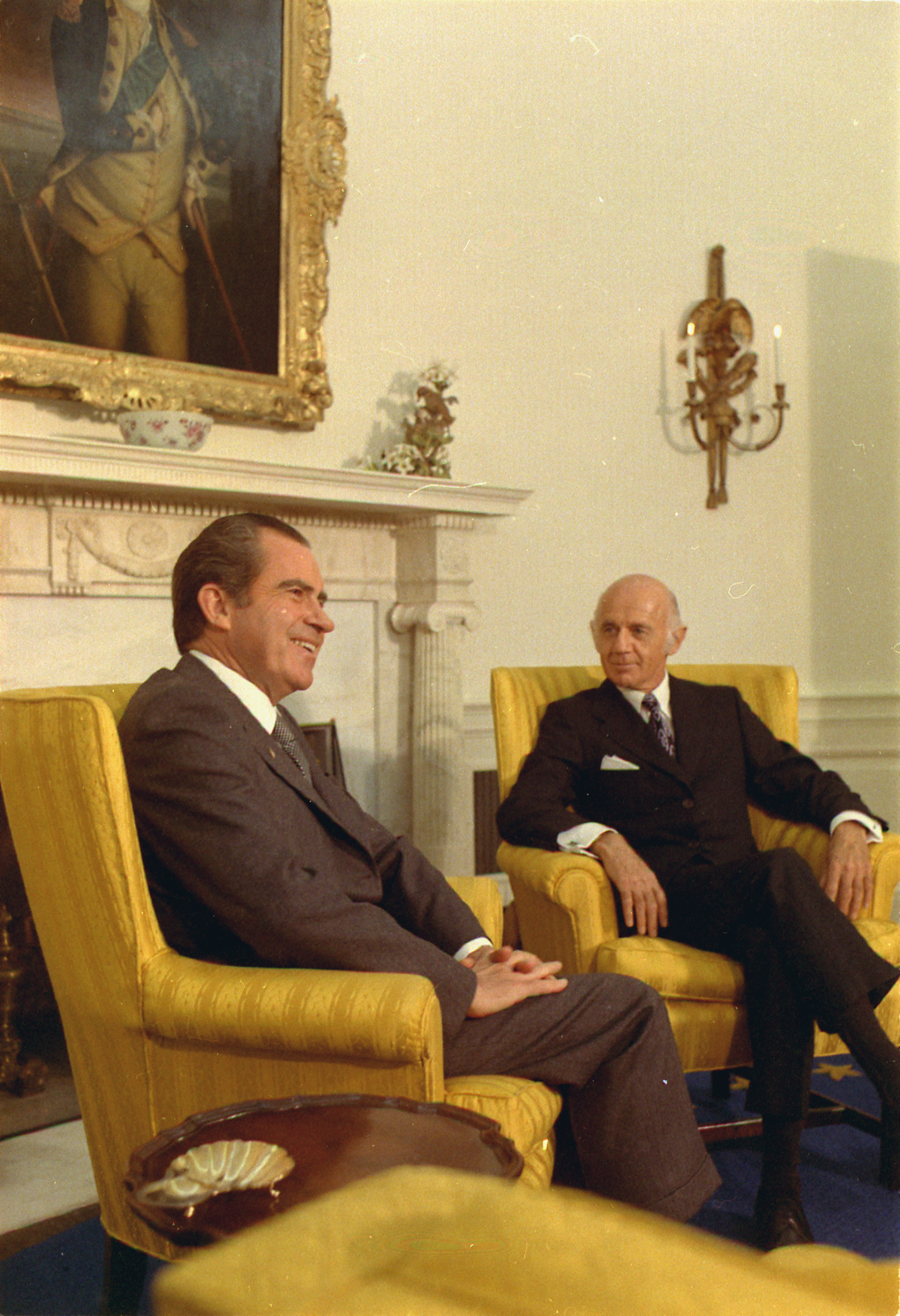
United States President Richard Nixon with Prime Minister McMahon at the White House in 1971

McMahon maintained Australia's diminishing commitment to Vietnam and criticised Opposition leader, Gough Whitlam, for visiting the People's Republic of China in 1972 – only to have the US President Richard Nixon announce a planned visit soon after. Anticipating a US withdrawal, the McMahon government announced an 'accelerated withdrawal' of Australian troops in Vietnam in July 1971.

=== Indigenous Affairs ===
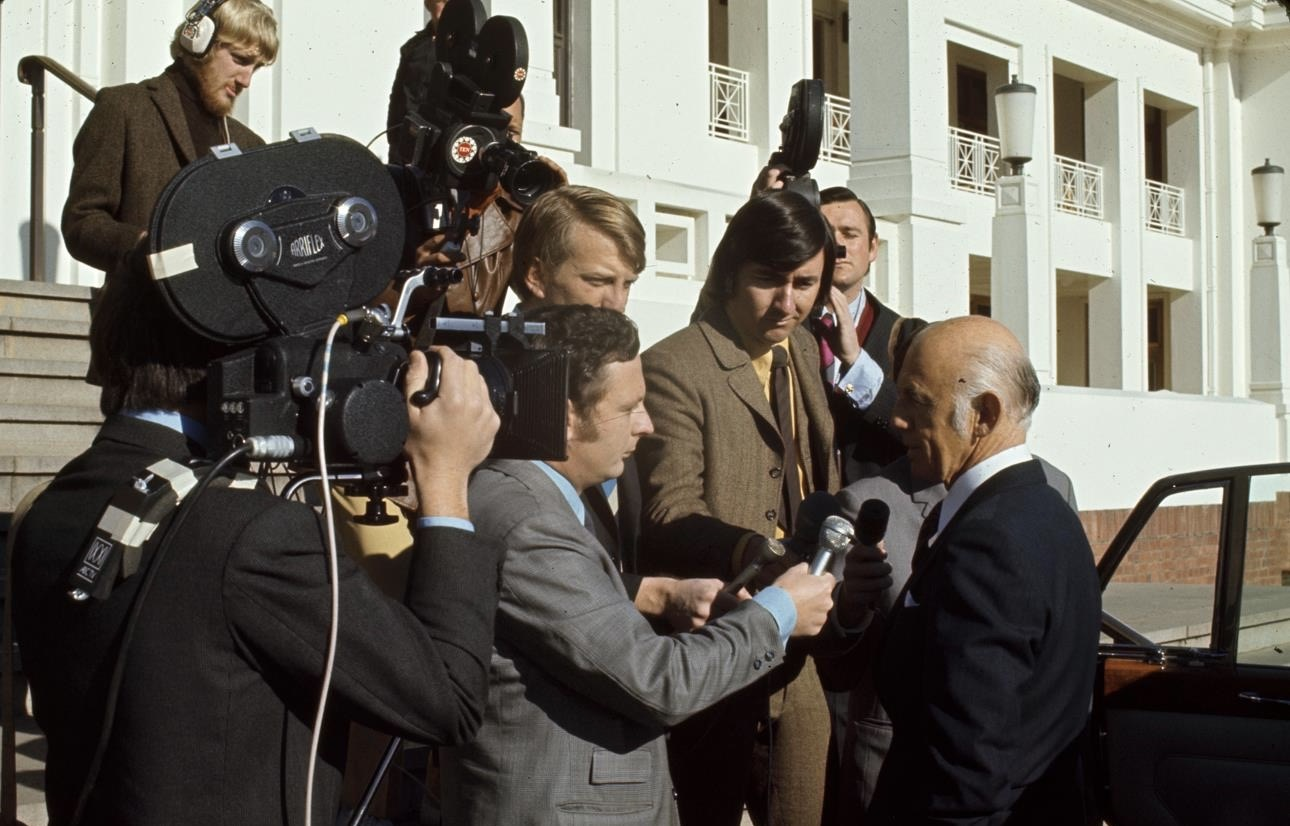
McMahon confronted by reporters in 1972

Bill Wentworth occupied the new post of Minister for Aboriginal Affairs. During McMahon's period in office, Neville Bonner joined the Senate and became the first Indigenous Australian in the Australian Parliament. Bonner was chosen by the Liberal Party to fill a Senate vacancy in 1971 and celebrated his maiden parliamentary speech with a boomerang throwing display on the lawns of Parliament. Bonner went on to win election at the 1972 election and served as a Liberal senator for 12 years. He worked on Indigenous and social welfare issues and proved an independent minded senator, often crossing the floor on parliamentary votes. Land rights were a topical issue during the term of the McMahon government and in 1972, Aboriginal protestors set up a Tent Embassy on the lawns in front of Parliament House. The government accepted the recommendations of the Gibb committee on Aboriginal employment, which included the lease of land at Wattie Creek to the Gurindji people, who had been staging a strike on a section of the Vestey company lease since 1966.

=== Foreign policy ===
Former treasurer Les Bury succeeded McMahon in the foreign affairs portfolio. In his first statement as foreign minister, Bury "stressed the paramount importance of Asia to Australia", warned against complacency over the Soviet naval presence in the Indian Ocean, and called on Japan to play a greater role in regional affairs. He also reiterated Australian support for the Nixon Doctrine. In May 1971, he stated that Taiwan should be separately represented in the United Nations and that the Republic of China's claims to Mainland China were "somewhat fictional". After the announcement of Nixon's visit to China in July 1971, he reaffirmed the Australian government's long-standing policy of non-recognition of the People's Republic of China and stated that he would not visit Beijing, but suggested Australia might formalise relations with the PRC at a later point.

In June 1971, Bury publicly denounced French nuclear testing in the South Pacific, stating the tests were "a matter of considerable regret to the government of Australia" and that he supported a Comprehensive Nuclear-Test-Ban Treaty.

=== Economy ===
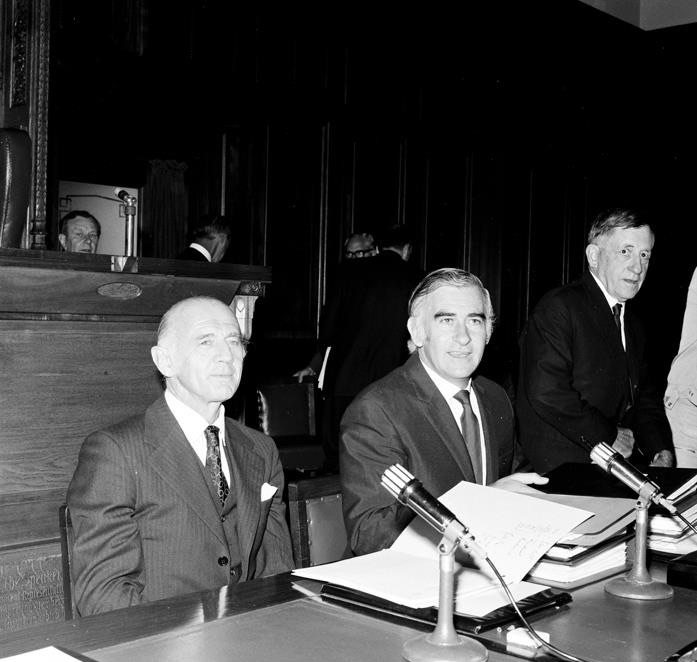
McMahon with Treasurer Billy Snedden in April 1971

As the 1972 election approached, inflation and unemployment were increasing and the world economy was entering the 1970s decline. In 1971, the government delivered a deflationary budget in response to economic conditions - but in 1972, faced with the challenge of Gough Whitlam's vast program of expenditure, Treasurer Snedden delivered a more election-friendly high spending budget.

=== 1972 election ===
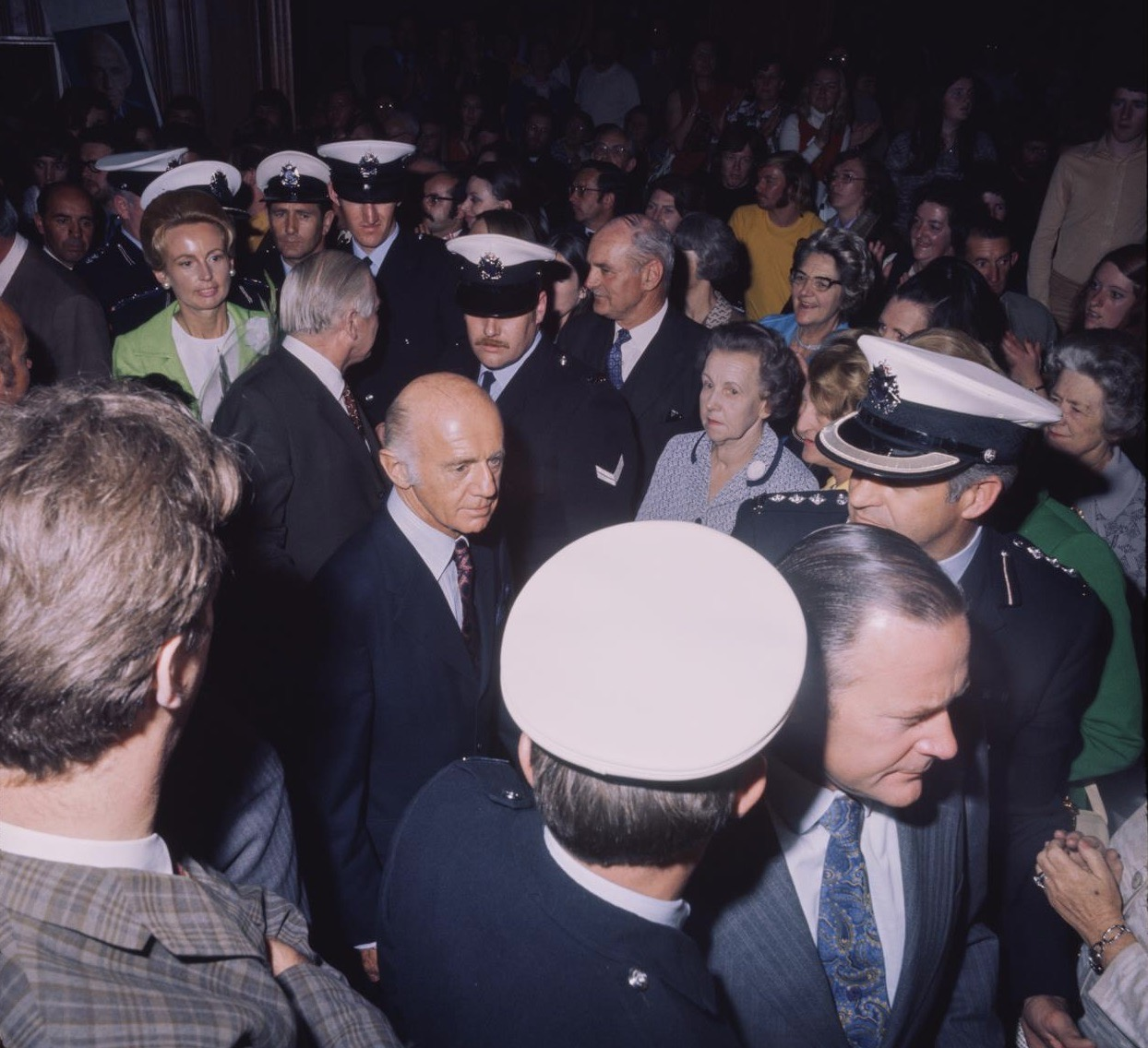
McMahon campaigning during the 1972 election

The McMahon government ended when Gough Whitlam led the Australian Labor Party out of its 23-year period in Opposition at 2 December 1972 election. The charismatic Whitlam led an effective campaign that resulted in Labor securing 67 seats to the Coalition's 58, leaving McMahon as the first non-Labor leader to suffer an election defeat since 1946.

== Aftermath ==
McMahon did not recontest the leadership of the Liberal Party and became a backbencher. Several candidates ran for the party leadership, including John Gorton, but the party settled on Billy Snedden with Phillip Lynch as Deputy. McMahon remained in the parliament as a backbencher for 10 years after losing office as Prime Minister. He retired in 1982. Snedden led the Coalition to the 1974 Election. Malcolm Fraser became leader of the Liberals and led the Coalition to a landslide victory against Gough Whitlam's Labor Party, following the 1975 Dismissal of the Whitlam government.

== See also ==
- History of Australia
- History of Australia since 1945
- McMahon Ministry
