= Reginald Swartz =

Australian politician

The Honourable Sir Reginald Swartz KBE
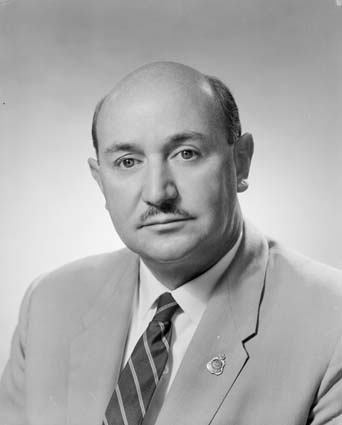

Leader of the House
- In office 10 March 1971 – 15 August 1972
- Leader: William McMahon
- Preceded by: Billy Snedden
- Succeeded by: Don Chipp

Member of the Australian Parliament for Darling Downs
- In office 10 December 1949 – 2 November 1972
- Preceded by: Arthur Fadden
- Succeeded by: Tom McVeigh

Personal details
- Born: 14 April 1911 Brisbane, Queensland
- Died: 2 February 2006 (aged 94)
- Party: Liberal Party of Australia
- Occupation: Soldier

Sir Reginald William Colin Swartz KBE (14 April 1911 – 2 February 2006) was an Australian Liberal Party politician who was Minister during the governments of Sir Robert Menzies, Harold Holt and John Gorton. In particular, he is best known as the Minister for Civil Aviation between 1966 and 1969.

He represented the Division of Darling Downs in the House of Representatives between 1949 and 1972 and was a member of the Government for the entire length of his parliamentary service.

Swartz Barracks at the Oakey Army Aviation Centre is named for him.

== Early life ==
Swartz was born in Brisbane in 1911 and attended Toowoomba Grammar School. He was born to father John Swartz and worked as a sales clerk before he joined the 2nd AIF during World War II. Swartz was a member of the 2/26th Infantry Battalion of the Australian 8th Division in the Battle of Malaya at the rank of Lieutenant. After capture by the Japanese, he was a prisoner of war in Changi prison and worked on the Burma–Thailand Railway. He was appointed a Member of the Order of the British Empire for his war service.

In 1988, he accompanied John Howard along with two other parliamentarians who were former POWs, John Carrick and Tom Uren, to the opening of the Hellfire Pass Memorial Museum, commemorating the 2700 Australians who died working on the Burma-Thailand Railway.

== Parliamentary career ==
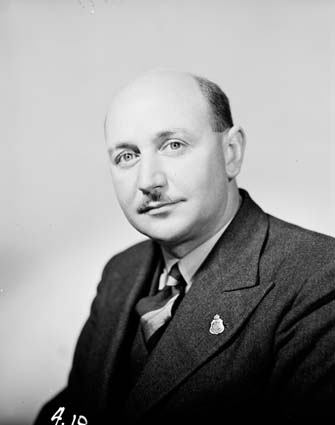
Swartz in 1954.

Swartz was elected as the Liberal member for Darling Downs in 1949. As such, he was a "Forty-niner" which was the name for the Liberal and Country Party members first elected in the landslide victory by the Coalition in that year.

Menzies appointed Swartz as Parliamentary Secretary for Trade in 1956. In that position, he led Trade Missions to India in 1956 and South East Asia in 1958. He was appointed as Minister for Repatriation in 1961 and served in that position before becoming Minister for Health from 1964 to 1966 and briefly Minister for Social Services in early 1965.

Harold Holt appointed Swartz as Minister for Civil Aviation in 1966 and he served in that Ministry for three years. John Gorton appointed him as Minister for National Development in 1969 and he served in that position for three years. He was Leader of the House responsible for managing Government business in the House of Representatives from 1971 to 1972.

Swartz was knighted in 1972 and retired as a parliamentarian later that year.

Political offices
Preceded by Walter Cooper	Minister for Repatriation; 1961–1964	Succeeded by Colin McKellar
Preceded by Harrie Wade	Minister for Health; 1964–1966	Succeeded by Jim Forbes
Preceded by Hugh Roberton	Minister for Social Services; 1965	Succeeded by Ian Sinclair
Preceded by Denham Henty	Minister for Civil Aviation; 1966–1969	Succeeded by Bob Cotton
Preceded by David Fairbairn	Minister for National Development; 1969–1972	Succeeded by Rex Patterson
Parliament of Australia
Preceded by Arthur Fadden	Member for Darling Downs; 1949–1972	Succeeded by Tom McVeigh
