= Les Bury =

Australian politician (1913–1986)

The Honourable Les Bury CMG
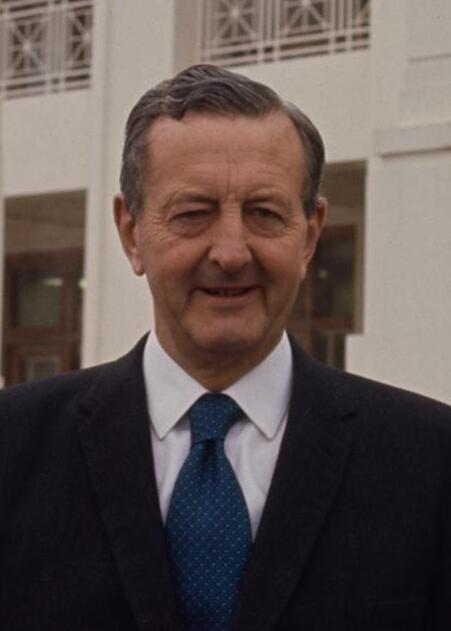
- Bury in 1971

Minister for Foreign Affairs
- In office 22 March 1971 – 2 August 1971
- Prime Minister: William McMahon
- Preceded by: William McMahon
- Succeeded by: Nigel Bowen

Treasurer of Australia
- In office 12 November 1969 – 22 March 1971
- Prime Minister: John Gorton
- Preceded by: William McMahon
- Succeeded by: Billy Snedden

Minister for Labour and National Service
- In office 26 January 1966 – 12 November 1969
- Prime Minister: Harold Holt; John McEwen; John Gorton
- Preceded by: William McMahon
- Succeeded by: Billy Snedden

Minister for Housing
- In office 18 December 1963 – 26 January 1966
- Prime Minister: Robert Menzies
- Preceded by: Wilfrid Kent Hughes
- Succeeded by: Annabelle Rankin

Minister for Air
- In office 22 December 1961 – 27 July 1962
- Prime Minister: Robert Menzies
- Preceded by: Harrie Wade
- Succeeded by: David Fairbairn

Member of the Australian Parliament for Wentworth
- In office 8 December 1956 – 11 April 1974
- Preceded by: Eric Harrison
- Succeeded by: Robert Ellicott

Personal details
- Born: 25 February 1913 Willesden, London, England, United Kingdom
- Died: 7 September 1986 (aged 73) Sydney, New South Wales, Australia
- Party: Liberal
- Spouse: Ann Weigall (m. 1940)
- Education: Queens' College, Cambridge

Leslie Harry Ernest Bury CMG (25 February 1913 – 7 September 1986) was an Australian politician and economist. He was a member of the Liberal Party and was a senior cabinet minister in the 1960s and early 1970s.

Bury was born in England and attended Queens' College, Cambridge. He moved to Australia in 1935 to work as an economist at the Bank of New South Wales, later joining the Department of the Treasury. Bury was elected to the House of Representatives at the 1956 Wentworth by-election. He held ministerial office in Coalition governments for nearly a decade, serving as Minister for Air (1961–1962), Housing (1963–1966), Labour and National Service (1966–1969), Treasurer (1969–1971) and Foreign Affairs (1971). He retired from politics at the 1974 election after losing preselection.

== Early life ==
Bury was born on 25 February 1913 in Willesden, London, England. He was the son of Doris Elma (née Walgrave) and Ernest Bury; his father was an Anglican clergyman.

Bury attended Herne Bay College in Eddington, Kent, before matriculating to Queens' College, Cambridge. His education was financed by scholarships and financial assistance from an uncle. He graduated Bachelor of Arts in 1934 and was a member of the Cambridge University Conservative Association. His lecturers at Cambridge included John Maynard Keynes and Joan Robinson, both of whom made a lasting impression.

Bury moved to Sydney in December 1935 to work in the economic department of the Bank of New South Wales. He assisted general manager Alfred Charles Davidson during the 1935 Banking Royal Commission. Bury enlisted in the army in 1942, serving with heavy artillery fixed defences and with the 12th Australian Radar Detachment. He was posted to the Directorate of Research and Civil Affairs in January 1945.

In May 1946, Bury joined the Commonwealth Public Service as a secretary in the economic relations division of the Department of External Affairs, where he was involved in trade negotiations. He moved to the Department of the Treasury in 1949. He was based in Washington, D.C., from 1951 to 1956 as the Australian representative on the International Monetary Fund and an executive director of the International Bank for Reconstruction and Development.

== Political career ==
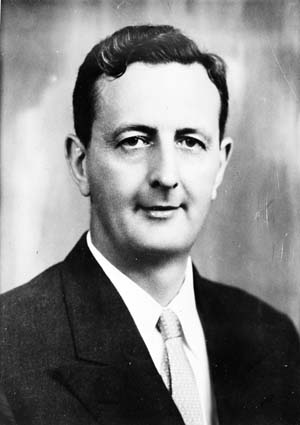
Bury in 1958

Bury was elected to the House of Representatives at the 1956 Wentworth by-election, following the resignation of Eric Harrison to become High Commissioner to the United Kingdom. He defeated 15 other candidates for Liberal preselection.

According to Peter King, he "... would attend football matches with Labor leader Arthur Calwell in Melbourne and ... [shadow Treasurer] Frank Crean stayed at the Bury home in Sydney".

=== Menzies Government ===
Bury was appointed Minister for Air and Minister assisting the Treasurer in Robert Menzies' ninth ministry in December 1961. On 27 July 1962 he was sacked for speaking in favour of the accession of the United Kingdom to the European Economic Community, saying that "European integration, of which the Common Market is an essential expression, is a keystone of the grand design for Western survival". This strongly conflicted with Deputy Prime Minister John McEwen's concerns over its impact on Australian exports to the United Kingdom. In December 1963, he returned to cabinet as Minister for Housing. He introduced the First Home Owners Grant, which continues to be a feature of the Australian political landscape.

=== Holt government ===
In January 1966, Bury became Minister for Labour and National Service in Harold Holt's first ministry, during the Vietnam War, when he was responsible for the continued implementation of national service.

After Holt's disappearance in December 1966, Bury was one of four candidates to contest the Liberal leadership ballot, along with John Gorton, Paul Hasluck, and Billy Snedden. He had some support within the party, including from Peter Howson, and was reportedly Menzies' second most preferred candidate after Hasluck. According to Graham Freudenberg much of his support was due to his status as the only candidate from New South Wales. However, he was virtually unknown among the general public and was not seen as a strong television performer. Bury polled an estimated 16 votes (out of 81) on the first ballot, ahead of only Snedden. Both were eliminated and Gorton went on to defeat Hasluck in the final ballot.

=== Gorton government ===
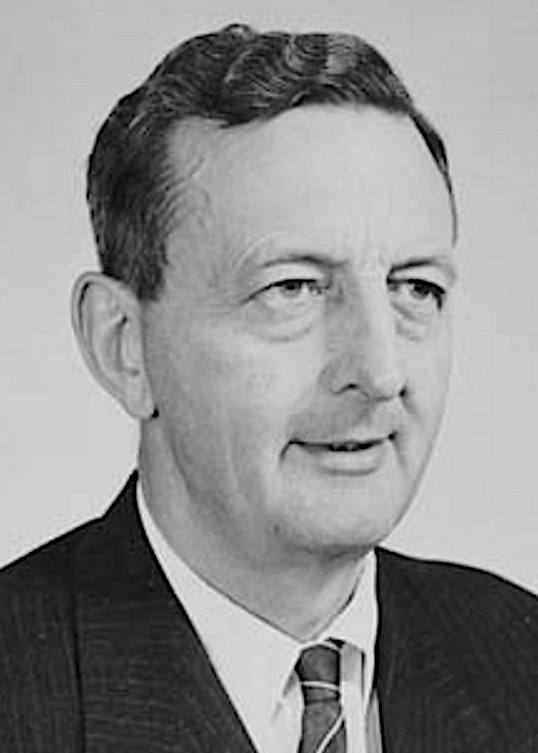
Bury in 1967

Bury remained Minister for Labour and National Service in the first Gorton ministry. With Phillip Lynch as Minister for the Army, a slogan chanted at anti-war protests was "lynch Bury and bury Lynch". After the 1969 federal election, Bury was promoted to treasurer, his most desired portfolio. His promotion was probably due to his support for Gorton in the 1969 leadership spill, which saw then-treasurer William McMahon challenge for the prime ministership. McMahon was shifted to foreign affairs and Bury took his place as treasurer. Gorton also reputedly viewed Bury as someone who was likely to be compliant and not challenge his own economic agenda.

Bury presented only a single budget as treasurer, for 1970–71. It was described as "very much a Treasury-inspired document", and also had significant input from Gorton. He was one of the pioneers of the forward estimates system, in March 1971 asking ministers to provide estimates of expenditure for future activities. He was an advocate of alternative measures of economic progress, stating "we must not fall too readily to exclusive worship at the altar of GNP [...] our prime concern should always be the social welfare of the community as a whole". He was also an early supporter of a broad-based national consumption tax, akin to the current GST.

There were concerns about Bury's health during his period as treasurer, with one source describing him as "a worn-out and a tired man, suffering from ill-health and lacking concentration". He suffered from coronary arteriosclerosis and hypertension. Bury's departmental secretary Dick Randall stated that, from Treasury's perspective, he "lost too many cabinet fights". He came into conflict with the more experienced figures of Gorton, McEwen, and McMahon who were not always in agreement with the departmental agenda. He opposed the creation of the Australian Industry Development Corporation, preferring the use of foreign capital, but was overridden by McEwen and Gorton.

=== McMahon government ===
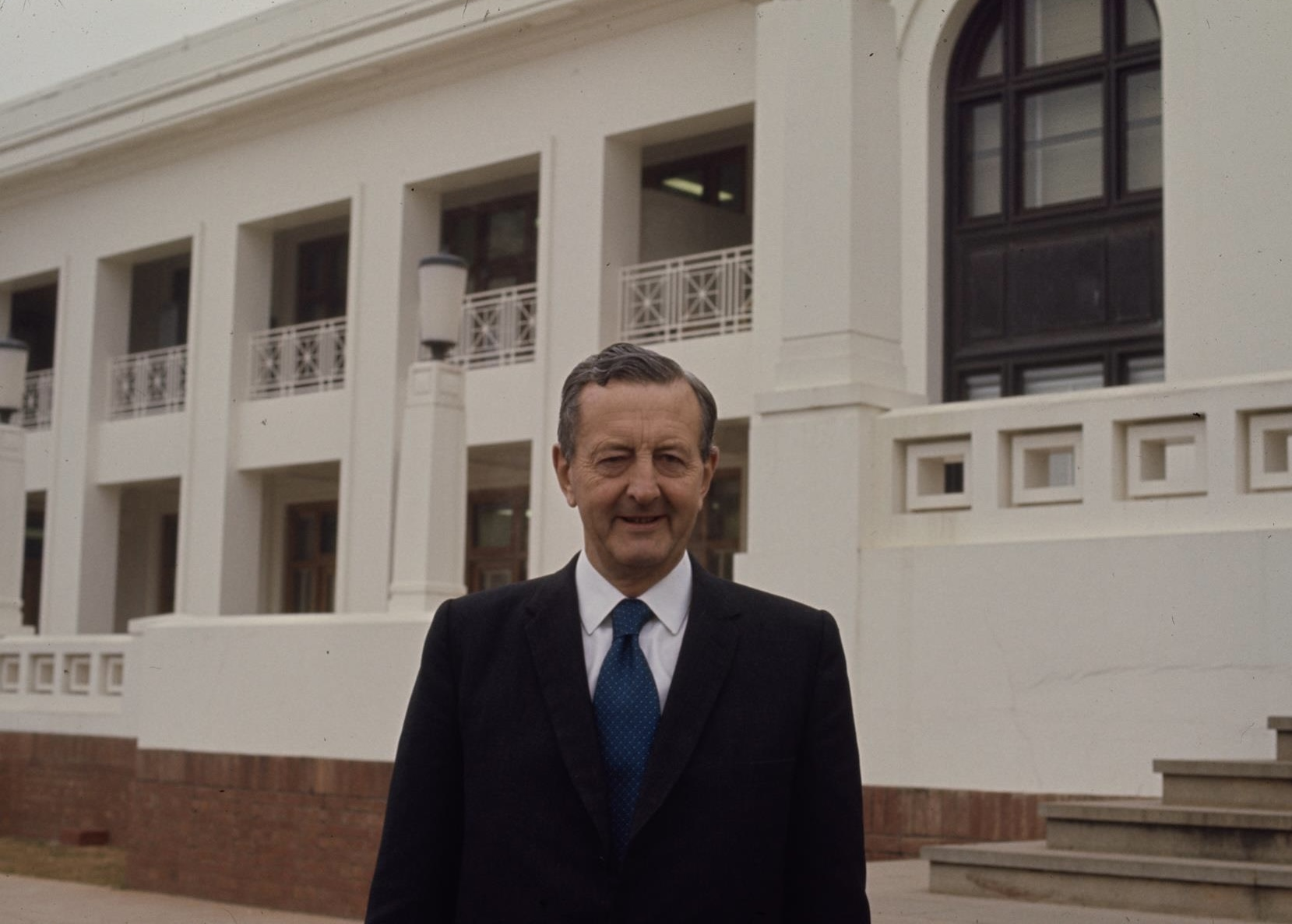
Bury in 1971

William McMahon replaced Gorton as prime minister following the 1971 Liberal leadership spill. Bury briefly remained treasurer while McMahon assembled his new ministry, then on 22 March 1971 was appointed Minister for Foreign Affairs, the portfolio previously held by McMahon.

In his first statement as foreign minister, Bury "stressed the paramount importance of Asia to Australia", reiterated Australian support for the Nixon Doctrine, warning against complacency over the Soviet naval presence in the Indian Ocean, and called on Japan to play a greater role in regional affairs. In June 1971 he publicly denounced French nuclear testing in the South Pacific, stating they were "a matter of considerable regret to the government of Australia" and stated he supported a Comprehensive Nuclear-Test-Ban Treaty.

Australian relations with China were a major aspect of Bury's period as foreign minister. In May 1971, he stated that Taiwan should be separately represented in the United Nations and that the Republic of China's claims to Mainland China were "somewhat fictional". After the announcement of Nixon's visit to China in July 1971, he reaffirmed the Australian government's long-standing policy of non-recognition of the People's Republic of China and stated that he would not visit Beijing, but suggested Australia might formalise relations with the PRC at a later point. His stance on China angered the anti-communist Democratic Labor Party.

Bury was abruptly removed from cabinet in a reshuffle on 2 August 1971. The statement released by McMahon stated that Bury had resigned, however Bury confirmed that he had in fact been dismissed and "denied suffering any ill health necessitating his removal from office", a response to rumours about health issues circulated by McMahon. When questioned by reporters McMahon refused to provide a reason for Bury's removal. Bury was publicly critical of the McMahon government in the immediate aftermath of his dismissal, stating that cabinet ministers had been "leaking like a sieve". He disapproved of the 1971–72 budget, stating that personal income tax rates were too high and were acting as a disincentive. He reiterated his calls for a broad-based retail turnover tax and also supported a national superannuation scheme.

Bury was re-elected at the 1972 election, which saw the defeat of the Coalition government. He was not included in the shadow ministry formed by new Liberal leader Billy Snedden and remained in parliament as a backbencher. In December 1973, Bury was defeated for Liberal preselection by Bob Ellicott, in a vote which included 17 candidates and required six ballots. He retired from parliament at the 1974 election.

== Personal life ==
In 1940, Bury married Anne Weigall, with whom he had four sons. He died on 7 September 1986 in Vaucluse, New South Wales.

In the Queen's Birthday Honours of June 1979, Bury was appointed a Companion of the Order of St Michael and St George (CMG), in recognition of his service to the Parliament of Australia.

== Notes ==
Political offices
Preceded by Harrie Wade	Minister for Air; 1961–1962	Succeeded by David Fairbairn
New title	Minister for Housing; 1963–1966	Succeeded by Annabelle Rankin
Preceded by William McMahon	Minister for Labour and National Service; 1966–1969	Succeeded by Billy Snedden
Preceded by William McMahon	Treasurer; 1969–1971	Succeeded by Billy Snedden
Preceded by William McMahon	Minister for Foreign Affairs; 1971	Succeeded by Nigel Bowen
Parliament of Australia
Preceded by Eric Harrison	Member for Wentworth; 1956–1974	Succeeded by Robert Ellicott
