= Liberal government =

Liberal government may refer to:

== Australia ==
In Australian politics, a Liberal government may refer to the following governments administered by the Liberal Party of Australia:

- Menzies Government (1949–66), several Australian ministries under Sir Robert Menzies
  - Fourth Menzies Ministry, the Australian government under Robert Menzies (1949–1951)
  - Fifth Menzies Ministry, the Australian government under Robert Menzies (1951–1954)
  - Sixth Menzies Ministry, the Australian government under Robert Menzies (1954–1956)
  - Seventh Menzies Ministry, the Australian government under Robert Menzies (1956–1958)
  - Eighth Menzies Ministry, the Australian government under Robert Menzies (1958–1961)
  - Ninth Menzies Ministry, the Australian government under Sir Robert Menzies (1961–1963)
  - Tenth Menzies Ministry, the Australian government under Sir Robert Menzies (1963–1966)
- Holt government, two Australian ministries under Harold Holt
  - First Holt Ministry, the Australian government under Harold Holt (1966)
  - Second Holt Ministry, the Australian government under Harold Holt (1966–1967)
- Gorton government, two Australian ministries under John Gorton
  - First Gorton Ministry, the Australian government under John Gorton (1968–1969)
  - Second Gorton Ministry, the Australian government under John Gorton (1969–1971)
- McMahon government, one Australian ministry under William McMahon
  - McMahon Ministry, the Australian government under William McMahon (1971–1972)
- Fraser government, five Australian ministries under Malcolm Fraser
  - First Fraser Ministry, the Australian government under Malcolm Fraser (1975)
  - Second Fraser Ministry, the Australian government under Malcolm Fraser (1975–1977)
  - Third Fraser Ministry, the Australian government under Malcolm Fraser (1977–1980)
  - Fourth Fraser Ministry, the Australian government under Malcolm Fraser (1980–1983)
- Howard government, four Australian ministries under John Howard
  - First Howard Ministry, the Australian government under John Howard (1996–1998)
  - Second Howard Ministry, the Australian government under John Howard (1998–2001)
  - Third Howard Ministry, the Australian government under John Howard (2001–2004)
  - Fourth Howard Ministry, the Australian government under John Howard (2004–2007)
- Abbott government, one Australian ministry under Tony Abbott
  - Abbott Ministry, the Australian government under Tony Abbott (2013–2015)
- Turnbull government, two Australian ministries under Malcolm Turnbull
  - First Turnbull Ministry, the Australian government under Malcolm Turnbull (2015–2018)
  - Second Turnbull Ministry, the Australian government under Malcolm Turnbull (2015–2018)
- Morrison government, two Australian ministries under Scott Morrison
  - First Morrison Ministry, the Australian government under Scott Morrison (2018–present)
  - Second Morrison Ministry, the Australian government under Scott Morrison (2018–present)

== Canada ==
In Canadian politics, a Liberal government may refer to the following governments administered by the Liberal Party of Canada:

- 2nd Canadian Ministry, the Canadian government under Alexander Mackenzie (1873–1878)
- 8th Canadian Ministry, the Canadian government under Sir Wilfrid Laurier (1896–1911)
- 12th Canadian Ministry, the Canadian government under William Lyon Mackenzie King (1921–1926)
- 14th Canadian Ministry, the Canadian government under William Lyon Mackenzie King (1926–1930)
- 16th Canadian Ministry, the Canadian government under William Lyon Mackenzie King (1935–1948)
- 17th Canadian Ministry, the Canadian government under Louis St. Laurent (1948–1957)
- 19th Canadian Ministry, the Canadian government under Lester B. Pearson (1963–1968)
- 20th Canadian Ministry, the Canadian government under Pierre Trudeau (1968–1979)
- 22nd Canadian Ministry, the Canadian government under Pierre Trudeau (1980–1984)
- 23rd Canadian Ministry, the Canadian government under John Turner (1984)
- 26th Canadian Ministry, the Canadian government under Jean Chrétien (1993–2003)
- 27th Canadian Ministry, the Canadian government under Paul Martin (2003–2006)
- 29th Canadian Ministry, the Canadian government under Justin Trudeau (2015–present)

== United Kingdom ==
In British politics, a Liberal government may refer to the following governments administered by the Liberal Party:

- Liberal government, 1859–1866, the British government under Lord Palmerston and Lord Russell respectively
- First Gladstone ministry, the British government under William Ewart Gladstone (1868–1874)
- Second Gladstone ministry, the British government under William Ewart Gladstone (1880–1885)
- Third Gladstone ministry, the British government under William Ewart Gladstone (1886)
- Liberal government, 1892–1895, the British government under William Ewart Gladstone and Lord Rosebery respectively
- Liberal government, 1905–1915, the British government under Sir Henry Campbell-Bannerman and H. H. Asquith respectively

== See also ==
- Liberal autocracy
- Liberal democracy
- Liberal Party
- Liberal Party leadership election
- List of Australian ministries
- List of British governments
- List of Canadian ministries
- List of New Zealand ministries
- United Kingdom coalition government
