= Menzies Ministry =

Menzies Ministry may refer to any of the following ministries of the Australian Commonwealth:

- First Menzies Ministry
- Second Menzies Ministry
- Third Menzies Ministry
- Fourth Menzies Ministry
- Fifth Menzies Ministry
- Sixth Menzies Ministry
- Seventh Menzies Ministry
- Eighth Menzies Ministry
- Ninth Menzies Ministry
- Tenth Menzies Ministry
