= Seventh Menzies ministry =

37th ministry of government of Australia

- 37th Ministry of Australia

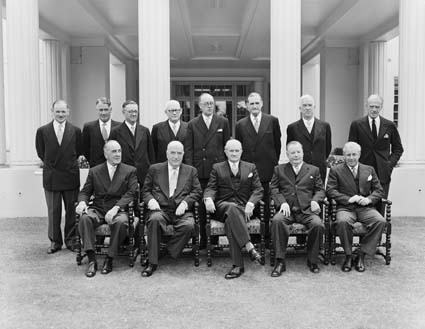
- The Cabinet of the Seventh Menzies ministry at their swearing-in
- Date formed: 11 January 1956
- Date dissolved: 10 December 1958

People and organisations
- Monarch: Elizabeth II
- Governor-General: Sir William Slim
- Prime Minister: Robert Menzies
- No. of ministers: 24
- Member party: Liberal–Country coalition
- Status in legislature: Coalition majority government
- Opposition party: Labor
- Opposition leader: H. V. Evatt

History
- Election: 10 December 1955
- Outgoing election: 22 November 1958
- Legislature term: 22nd
- Predecessor: Sixth Menzies ministry
- Successor: Eighth Menzies ministry

The Seventh Menzies ministry (Liberal–Country Coalition) was the 37th ministry of the Government of Australia. It was led by the country's 12th Prime Minister, Robert Menzies. The Seventh Menzies ministry succeeded the Sixth Menzies ministry, which dissolved on 11 January 1956 following the federal election that took place in the previous December. It is the first ministry to consist of a two-tier ministry, with only senior ministers being members of Cabinet, while the other ministers are in the outer ministry. With the exception of the Whitlam government and the caretaker First Fraser ministry, this practice has endured to this day. The ministry was replaced by the Eighth Menzies ministry on 10 December 1958 following the 1958 federal election.

Allen Fairhall, who died in 2006, was the last surviving member of the Seventh Menzies ministry; Fairhall was also the last surviving member of the Ninth Menzies ministry. Hugh Roberton was the last surviving Country junior minister, and Paul Hasluck and John McEwen were the last surviving Liberal and Country Cabinet ministers respectively.

== Cabinet ==
Party	Minister	Portrait	Portfolio
Liberal	Robert Menzies (1894–1978) MP for Kooyong (1934–1966)		Prime Minister; Leader of the Liberal Party
Country	Sir Arthur Fadden (1894–1973) MP for McPherson (1949–1958)		Leader of the Country Party (to 26 March 1958); Treasurer
Liberal	Sir Eric Harrison (1892–1974) MP for Wentworth (1931–1956)		Deputy Leader of the Liberal Party (to 26 September 1956); Minister for the Army (to 28 February 1956); Minister for Defence Production (to 24 October 1956); Vice-President of the Executive Council (to 24 October 1956); Leader of the House (to September 1956)
Liberal	Harold Holt (1908–1967) MP for Higgins (1949–1967)		Deputy Leader of the Liberal Party (from 26 September 1956); Minister for Labour and National Service; Minister for Immigration (to 24 October 1956); Leader of the House (from September 1956)
Country	John McEwen (1900–1980) MP for Murray (1949–1971)		Leader of the Country Party (from 26 March 1958); Deputy Leader of the Country Party (to 26 March 1958); Minister for Trade
Liberal	Richard Casey (1890–1976) MP for La Trobe (1949–1960)		Minister for External Affairs; Minister in charge of the Commonwealth Scientific and Industrial Research Organisation
Liberal	Philip McBride (1892–1982) MP for Wakefield (1946–1958)		Minister for Defence
Liberal	Neil O'Sullivan (1900–1968) Senator for Queensland (1947–1962)		Leader of the Government in the Senate; Minister for the Navy (to 24 October 1956); Attorney-General (from 15 August 1956); Vice-President of the Executive Council (from 24 October 1956)
Liberal	John Spicer (1899–1978) Senator for Victoria (1950–1956)		Attorney-General (to 14 August 1956)
Liberal	Bill Spooner (1897–1966) Senator for New South Wales (1950–1965)		Minister for National Development
Liberal	Athol Townley (1905–1963) MP for Denison (1949–1963)		Minister for Air; Minister for Civil Aviation (to 24 October 1956); Minister for Immigration (from 24 October 1956 to 19 March 1958); Minister for Defence Production (from 11 February 1958 to 23 April 1958); Minister for Supply (from 11 February 1958)
Liberal	Paul Hasluck (1905–1993) MP for Curtin (1949–1969)		Minister for Territories
Liberal	William McMahon (1908–1988) MP for Lowe (1949–1982) (in Cabinet from 18 October 1956)		Minister for Social Services (to 28 February 1956); Minister for Primary Industry
Liberal	Howard Beale (1898–1983) MP for Parramatta (1946–1958) (in Cabinet from 24 October 1956)		Minister for Supply (to 10 February 1958); Minister for Defence Production (from 24 October 1956 to 10 February 1958)
Liberal	Shane Paltridge (1910-1966) Senator for Western Australia (1951-1966) (in Cabinet from 11 February 1958)		Minister for Shipping and Transport; Minister for Civil Aviation (from 24 October 1956)

== Outer ministry ==
Party	Minister	Portrait	Portfolio
Country	Walter Cooper (1888–1973) Senator for Queensland (1935–1968)		Minister for Repatriation
Country	Charles Davidson (1897–1985) MP for Dawson (1949–1963)		Deputy Leader of the Country Party (from 26 March 1958); Postmaster-General; Minister for the Navy (from 24 October 1956)
Liberal	Donald Cameron (1900–1974) MP for Oxley (1949–1961)		Minister for Health
Liberal	Allen Fairhall (1909–2006) MP for Paterson (1949–1969)		Minister for the Interior; Minister for Works
Liberal	Frederick Osborne (1909–1996) MP for Evans (1949–1961)		Minister for Customs and Excise (to 24 October 1956); Minister for Air (from 24 October 1956)
Liberal	John Cramer (1896–1994) MP for Bennelong (1949–1974) (in Ministry from 28 February 1956)		Minister for the Army (from 28 February 1956)
Country	Hugh Roberton (1900–1987) MP for Riverina (1949–1965) (in Ministry from 28 February 1956)		Minister for Social Services (from 28 February 1956)
Liberal	Denham Henty (1903–1978) Senator for Tasmania (1950–1968) (in Ministry from 24 October 1956)		Minister for Customs and Excise (from 24 October 1956)
Liberal	Alexander Downer (1910–1981) MP for Angas (1949–1964) (in Ministry from 20 March 1958)		Minister for Immigration (from 20 March 1958)
