= Gorton Ministry =

Gorton Ministry may refer to:

- First Gorton Ministry
- Second Gorton Ministry
