= First Gorton ministry =

44th ministry of government of Australia

- 44th Ministry of Australia

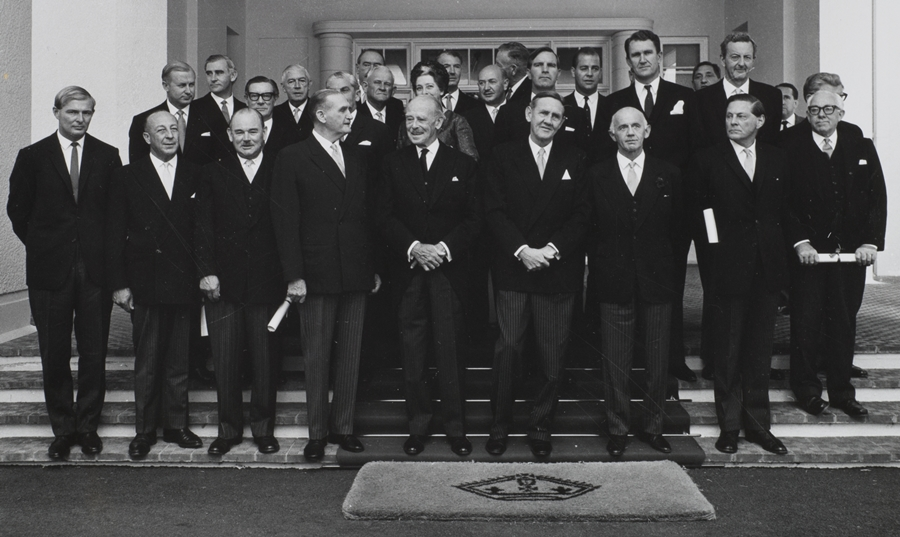
- Governor-General Lord Casey with first arrangement of newly appointed ministers to the Gorton ministry
- Date formed: 10 January 1968
- Date dissolved: 12 November 1969

People and organisations
- Monarch: Elizabeth II
- Governor-General: Lord Casey; Sir Paul Hasluck
- Prime Minister: John Gorton
- Deputy Prime Minister: John McEwen
- No. of ministers: 30
- Member party: Liberal–Country coalition
- Status in legislature: Coalition majority government
- Opposition party: Labor
- Opposition leader: Gough Whitlam

History
- Outgoing election: 25 October 1969
- Legislature term: 26th
- Predecessor: McEwen ministry
- Successor: Second Gorton ministry

The First Gorton ministry (Liberal–Country Coalition) was the 44th ministry of the Government of Australia. It was led by the country's 19th Prime Minister, John Gorton. The First Gorton ministry succeeded the McEwen ministry, which dissolved on 10 January 1968 following the election of Gorton as Liberal leader after the disappearance of former Prime Minister Harold Holt. The ministry was replaced by the Second Gorton ministry on 12 November 1969 following the 1969 federal election.

As of 1 May 2025, Ian Sinclair is the last surviving member of the First Gorton ministry; Sinclair is also the last surviving minister of the Menzies, Holt, McEwen, and McMahon governments, as well as the Second Gorton and the First Fraser ministries. James Forbes was the last surviving Liberal minister, and Malcolm Fraser was the last surviving Liberal Cabinet minister.

== Cabinet ==
Party	Minister	Portrait	Portfolio
Liberal	John Gorton (1911–2002) Senator for Victoria (1950–1968) MP for Higgins (1968–1975)		Prime Minister; Leader of the Liberal Party; Leader of the Government in the Senate (to 1 February 1968); Minister for Education and Science (to 28 February 1968)
Country	John McEwen (1900–1980) MP for Murray (1949–1971)		Deputy Prime Minister; Leader of the Country Party; Minister for Trade and Industry
Liberal	William McMahon (1908–1988) MP for Lowe (1949–1982)		Deputy Leader of the Liberal Party; Treasurer
Liberal	Paul Hasluck (1905–1993) MP for Curtin (1949–1969)		Minister for External Affairs (to 11 February 1969)
Liberal	Allen Fairhall (1909–2006) MP for Paterson (1949–1969)		Minister for Defence
Country	Doug Anthony (1929–2020) MP for Richmond (1957–1984)		Deputy Leader of the Country Party; Minister for Primary Industry
Liberal	Denham Henty (1903–1978) Senator for Tasmania (1950–1968)		Minister for Supply (to 28 February 1968)
Liberal	Alan Hulme (1907–1989) MP for Petrie (1963–1972)		Postmaster-General; Vice-President of the Executive Council
Liberal	David Fairbairn (1917–1994) MP for Farrer (1949–1975)		Minister for National Development
Liberal	Les Bury (1913–1986) MP for Wentworth (1956–1974)		Minister for Labour and National Service
Country	Ian Sinclair (born 1929) MP for New England (1963–1998)		Minister for Social Services (to 28 February 1968); Minister for Shipping and Transport (from 28 February 1968); Minister assisting the Minister for Trade and Industry
Liberal	Ken Anderson (1909–1985) Senator for New South Wales (1953–1975) (in Cabinet from 28 February 1968)		Minister for Customs and Excise (to 28 February 1968); Leader of the Government in the Senate (from 28 February 1968); Minister for Supply (from 28 February 1968)
Liberal	Malcolm Fraser (1930–2015) MP for Wannon (1955–1983) (in Cabinet from 28 February 1968)		Minister for the Army (to 28 February 1968); Minister for Education and Science (from 28 February 1968)
Liberal	Gordon Freeth (1914–2001) MP for Forrest (1949–1969) (in Cabinet from 11 February 1969)		Minister for Shipping and Transport (to 28 February 1968); Minister for Air (from 28 February 1968 to 13 February 1969); Minister assisting the Treasurer (from 28 February 1968 to 13 February 1969); Minister for External Affairs (from 11 February 1969)

== Outer ministry ==
Party	Minister	Portrait	Portfolio
Country	Charles Barnes (1901–1998) MP for McPherson (1958–1972)		Minister for Territories (to 28 February 1968); Minister for External Territories (from 28 February 1968)
Liberal	Reginald Swartz (1911–2006) MP for Darling Downs (1949–1972)		Minister for Civil Aviation; Minister assisting the Treasurer (from 13 February 1969)
Liberal	Billy Snedden (1926–1987) MP for Bruce (1955–1983)		Minister for Immigration; Leader of the House (to February 1969)
Liberal	James Forbes (1923–2019) MP for Barker (1956–1975)		Minister for Health
Liberal	Peter Howson (1919–2009) MP for Fawkner (1955–1969)		Minister for Air (to 28 February 1968); Minister assisting the Treasurer (to 28 February 1968)
Country	Colin McKellar (1903–1970) Senator for New South Wales (1958–1970)		Minister for Repatriation
Liberal	Dame Annabelle Rankin (1908–1986) Senator for Queensland (1947–1971)		Minister for Housing
Liberal	Nigel Bowen (1911–1994) MP for Parramatta (1964–1973)		Attorney-General
Liberal	Don Chipp (1925–2006) MP for Higinbotham (1960–1969)		Minister for the Navy (to 28 February 1968); Minister in charge of Tourist Activities under the Minister for Trade and Industry (to 28 February 1968)
Liberal	Bert Kelly (1912–1997) MP for Wakefield (1958–1977)		Minister for Works (to 28 February 1968); Minister for the Navy (from 28 February 1968)
Country	Peter Nixon (1928-2025) MP for Gippsland (1961–1983)		Minister for the Interior
Liberal	Phillip Lynch (1933–1984) MP for Flinders (1966–1982) (in Ministry from 28 February 1968)		Minister for the Army (from 28 February 1968)
Liberal	Malcolm Scott (1911–1989) Senator for Western Australia (1950–1971) (in Ministry from 28 February 1968)		Chief Government Whip in the Senate (to 12 February 1968); Minister for Customs and Excise (from 28 February 1968)
Liberal	Bill Wentworth (1907–2003) MP for Mackellar (1949–1977) (in Ministry from 28 February 1968)		Minister for Social Services (from 28 February 1968); Minister in charge of Aboriginal Affairs under the Prime Minister (from 28 February 1968)
Liberal	Reg Wright (1905–1990) Senator for Tasmania (1950–1978) (in Ministry from 28 February 1968)		Minister for Works (from 28 February 1968); Minister in charge of Tourist Activities under the Minister for Trade and Industry (from 28 February 1968)
Liberal	Dudley Erwin (1917–1984) MP for Ballaarat (1955–1975) (in Ministry from 13 February 1969)		Chief Government Whip in the House (to 12 February 1969); Minister for Air (from 13 February 1969)
