= Ninth Menzies ministry =

39th ministry of government of Australia

- 39th Ministry of Australia

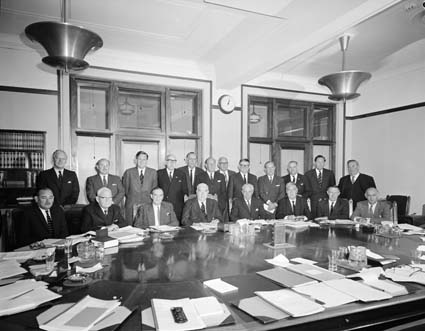
- The Ninth Menzies ministry shortly prior to the 1963 federal election.
- Date formed: 22 December 1961
- Date dissolved: 18 December 1963

People and organisations
- Monarch: Elizabeth II
- Governor-General: Viscount De L'Isle
- Prime Minister: Sir Robert Menzies
- No. of ministers: 23
- Member party: Liberal–Country coalition
- Status in legislature: Coalition majority government
- Opposition party: Labor
- Opposition leader: Arthur Calwell

History
- Election: 9 December 1961
- Outgoing election: 30 November 1963
- Legislature term: 24th
- Predecessor: Eighth Menzies ministry
- Successor: Tenth Menzies ministry

The Ninth Menzies ministry (Liberal–Country Coalition) was the 39th ministry of the Government of Australia. It was led by the country's 12th Prime Minister, (Sir) Robert Menzies. The Ninth Menzies ministry succeeded the Eighth Menzies ministry, which dissolved on 22 December 1961 following the federal election that took place in early December. The ministry was replaced by the Tenth Menzies ministry on 18 December 1963 following the 1963 federal election.

Allen Fairhall, who died in 2006, was the last surviving member of the Ninth Menzies ministry; Fairhall was also the last surviving member of the Seventh Menzies ministry. Hugh Roberton was the last surviving Country junior minister, and Sir Garfield Barwick and Charles Davidson were the last surviving Liberal and Country Cabinet ministers respectively.

== Cabinet ==
Party	Minister	Portrait	Portfolio
Liberal	Sir Robert Menzies (1894–1978) MP for Kooyong (1934–1966)		Prime Minister; Leader of the Liberal Party; Minister in charge of the Commonwealth Scientific and Industrial Research Organisation (to 16 February 1962)
Country	John McEwen (1900–1980) MP for Murray (1949–1971)		Leader of the Country Party; Minister for Trade
Liberal	Harold Holt (1908–1967) MP for Higgins (1949–1967)		Deputy Leader of the Liberal Party; Treasurer; Leader of the House
Liberal	Sir William Spooner (1897–1966) Senator for New South Wales (1950–1965)		Leader of the Government in the Senate; Minister for National Development; Vice-President of the Executive Council
Liberal	Athol Townley (1905–1963) MP for Denison (1949–1963)		Minister for Defence
Liberal	Paul Hasluck (1905–1993) MP for Curtin (1949–1969)		Minister for Territories
Liberal	William McMahon (1908–1988) MP for Lowe (1949–1982)		Minister for Labour and National Service
Liberal	Shane Paltridge (1910-1966) Senator for Western Australia (1951-1966)		Minister for Civil Aviation
Country	Charles Davidson (1897–1985) MP for Dawson (1949–1963)		Deputy Leader of the Country Party (to 11 December 1963); Postmaster-General
Liberal	Alexander Downer (1910–1981) MP for Angas (1949–1964)		Minister for Immigration
Liberal	Sir Garfield Barwick (1903–1997) MP for Parramatta (1958–1964)		Attorney-General; Minister for External Affairs
Country	Charles Adermann (1896–1979) MP for Fisher (1949–1972)		Deputy Leader of the Country Party (from 11 December 1963); Minister for Primary Industry

== Outer ministry ==
Party	Minister	Portrait	Portfolio
Liberal	John Cramer (1896–1994) MP for Bennelong (1949–1974)		Minister for the Army
Country	Hugh Roberton (1900–1987) MP for Riverina (1949–1965)		Minister for Social Services
Liberal	Denham Henty (1903–1978) Senator for Tasmania (1950–1968)		Minister for Customs and Excise
Liberal	Gordon Freeth (1914–2001) MP for Forrest (1949–1969)		Minister for the Interior; Minister for Works; Minister assisting the Attorney-General
Liberal	John Gorton (1911–2002) Senator for Victoria (1950–1968)		Minister for the Navy; Minister assisting the Minister for External Affairs; Minister in charge of Commonwealth Activities in Education and Research under the Prime Minister (from 16 February 1962)
Liberal	Hubert Opperman (1904–1996) MP for Corio (1949–1967)		Minister for Shipping and Transport
Country	Harrie Wade (1905–1964) Senator for Victoria (1956–1964)		Minister for Health
Liberal	Les Bury (1913–1986) MP for Wentworth (1956–1974)		Minister for Air (to 27 July 1962); Minister assisting the Treasurer (to 27 July 1962)
Liberal	Allen Fairhall (1909–2006) MP for Paterson (1949–1969)		Minister for Supply
Liberal	Reginald Swartz (1911–2006) MP for Darling Downs (1949–1972)		Minister for Repatriation
Liberal	David Fairbairn (1917–1994) MP for Farrer (1949–1975) (in Ministry from 4 August 1962)		Minister for Air (from 4 August 1962)
