= Eighth Menzies ministry =

38th ministry of government of Australia

- 38th Ministry of Australia

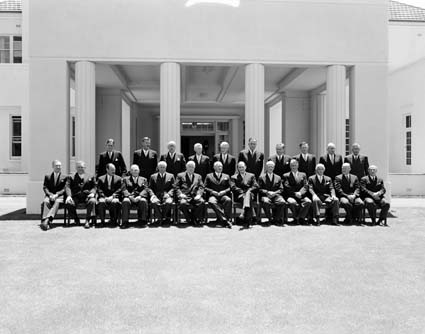
- The Eighth Menzies ministry at their swearing-in
- Date formed: 10 December 1958
- Date dissolved: 22 December 1961

People and organisations
- Monarch: Elizabeth II
- Governor-General: Sir William Slim; Lord Dunrossil; Viscount De L'Isle
- Prime Minister: Robert Menzies
- No. of ministers: 24
- Member party: Liberal–Country coalition
- Status in legislature: Coalition majority government
- Opposition party: Labor
- Opposition leader: H. V. Evatt; Arthur Calwell

History
- Election: 22 November 1958
- Outgoing election: 9 December 1961
- Legislature term: 23rd
- Predecessor: Seventh Menzies ministry
- Successor: Ninth Menzies ministry

The Eighth Menzies ministry (Liberal–Country Coalition) was the 38th ministry of the Government of Australia. It was led by Prime Minister Robert Menzies. The Eighth Menzies ministry succeeded the Seventh Menzies ministry, which dissolved on 10 December 1958 following the federal election that took place in late November. The ministry was replaced by the Ninth Menzies ministry on 22 December 1961 following the 1961 federal election.

John Gorton, who died in 2002, was the last surviving member of the Eighth Menzies ministry. Hugh Roberton was the last surviving Country junior minister, and Sir Garfield Barwick and Charles Davidson were the last surviving Liberal and Country Cabinet ministers respectively.

== Cabinet ==
Party	Minister	Portrait	Portfolio
Liberal	Robert Menzies (1894–1978) MP for Kooyong (1934–1966)		Prime Minister; Leader of the Liberal Party; Minister for External Affairs (from 4 February 1960)
Country	John McEwen (1900–1980) MP for Murray (1949–1971)		Leader of the Country Party; Minister for Trade
Liberal	Harold Holt (1908–1967) MP for Higgins (1949–1967)		Deputy Leader of the Liberal Party; Treasurer; Leader of the House
Liberal	Richard Casey (1890–1976) MP for La Trobe (1949–1960)		Minister for External Affairs (to 4 February 1960); Minister in charge of the Commonwealth Scientific and Industrial Research Organisation (to 4 February 1960)
Liberal	Bill Spooner (1897–1966) Senator for New South Wales (1950–1965)		Leader of the Government in the Senate; Minister for National Development; Vice-President of the Executive Council
Liberal	Athol Townley (1905–1963) MP for Denison (1949–1963)		Minister for Defence
Liberal	Paul Hasluck (1905–1993) MP for Curtin (1949–1969)		Minister for Territories
Liberal	William McMahon (1908–1988) MP for Lowe (1949–1982)		Minister for Labour and National Service
Liberal	Shane Paltridge (1910-1966) Senator for Western Australia (1951-1966)		Minister for Civil Aviation; Minister for Shipping and Transport (to 5 February 1960)
Country	Charles Davidson (1897–1985) MP for Dawson (1949–1963)		Deputy Leader of the Country Party; Postmaster-General
Liberal	Alexander Downer (1910–1981) MP for Angas (1949–1964)		Minister for Immigration
Liberal	Sir Garfield Barwick (1903–1997) MP for Parramatta (1958–1964)		Attorney-General
Country	Sir Charles Adermann (1896–1979) MP for Fisher (1949–1972) (in Cabinet from 4 February 1960)		Minister for Primary Industry

== Outer ministry ==
Party	Minister	Portrait	Portfolio
Country	Sir Walter Cooper (1888–1973) Senator for Queensland (1935–1968)		Minister for Repatriation (to 29 December 1960)
Liberal	Donald Cameron (1900–1974) MP for Oxley (1949–1961)		Minister for Health; Minister in charge of the Commonwealth Scientific and Industrial Research Organisation (from 4 February 1960)
Liberal	Frederick Osborne (1909–1996) MP for Evans (1949–1961)		Minister for Air (to 29 December 1960); Minister for Repatriation (from 29 December 1960)
Liberal	John Cramer (1896–1994) MP for Bennelong (1949–1974)		Minister for the Army
Country	Hugh Roberton (1900–1987) MP for Riverina (1949–1965)		Minister for Social Services
Liberal	Denham Henty (1903–1978) Senator for Tasmania (1950–1968)		Minister for Customs and Excise
Liberal	Gordon Freeth (1914–2001) MP for Forrest (1949–1969)		Minister for the Interior; Minister for Works
Liberal	John Gorton (1911–2002) Senator for Victoria (1950–1968)		Minister for the Navy; Minister assisting the Minister for External Affairs (from 23 February 1960)
Liberal	Alan Hulme (1907–1989) MP for Petrie (1949–1961)		Minister for Supply
Liberal	Hubert Opperman (1904–1996) MP for Corio (1949–1967) (in Ministry from 5 February 1960)		Chief Government Whip in the House (to 5 February 1960); Minister for Shipping and Transport (from 5 February 1960)
Country	Harrie Wade (1905–1964) Senator for Victoria (1956–1964) (in Ministry from 29 December 1960)		Minister for Air (from 29 December 1960)
