= Second Gorton ministry =

45th ministry of government of Australia

- 45th Ministry of Australia

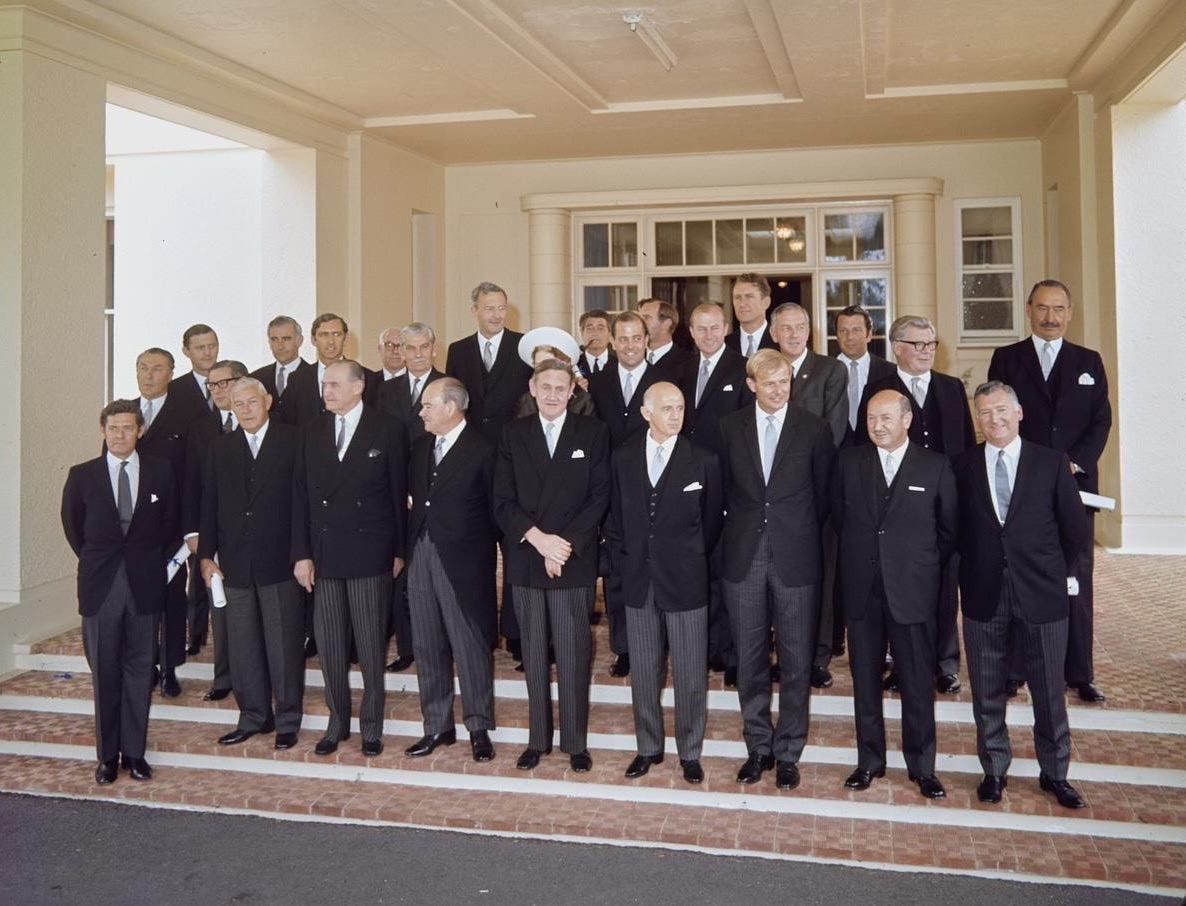
- Governor-General Sir Paul Hasluck with first arrangement of newly appointed ministers to the Second Gorton ministry
- Date formed: 12 November 1969
- Date dissolved: 10 March 1971

People and organisations
- Monarch: Elizabeth II
- Governor-General: Sir Paul Hasluck
- Prime Minister: John Gorton
- Deputy Prime Minister: John McEwen; Doug Anthony
- No. of ministers: 27
- Member party: Liberal–Country coalition
- Status in legislature: Coalition majority government
- Opposition party: Labor
- Opposition leader: Gough Whitlam

History
- Election: 25 October 1969
- Legislature term: 27th
- Predecessor: First Gorton ministry
- Successor: McMahon ministry

The Second Gorton ministry (Liberal–Country Coalition) was the 45th ministry of the Government of Australia. It was led by the country's 19th Prime Minister, John Gorton. The Second Gorton ministry succeeded the First Gorton ministry, which dissolved on 12 November 1969 following the federal election that took place in October. The ministry was replaced by the McMahon ministry on 10 March 1971 following the resignation of Gorton.

As of 1 May 2025, Ian Sinclair is the last surviving member of the Second Gorton ministry; Sinclair is also the last surviving minister of the Menzies, Holt, McEwen, and McMahon governments, as well as the First Gorton and the First Fraser ministries. Tom Hughes was the last surviving Liberal minister, and Malcolm Fraser was the last surviving Liberal Cabinet minister.

== Cabinet ==
Party	Minister	Portrait	Portfolio
Liberal	John Gorton (1911–2002) MP for Higgins (1968–1975)		Prime Minister; Leader of the Liberal Party
Country	John McEwen (1900–1980) MP for Murray (1949–1971)		Deputy Prime Minister (to 5 February 1971); Leader of the Country Party (to 5 February 1971); Minister for Trade and Industry (to 5 February 1971)
Liberal	William McMahon (1908–1988) MP for Lowe (1949–1982)		Deputy Leader of the Liberal Party; Minister for External Affairs (to 6 November 1970); Minister for Foreign Affairs (from 6 November 1970)
Country	Doug Anthony (1929–2020) MP for Richmond (1957–1984)		Deputy Prime Minister (from 5 February 1971); Leader of the Country Party (from 5 February 1971); Deputy Leader of the Country Party (to 5 February 1971); Minister for Primary Industry (to 5 February 1971); Minister for Trade and Industry (from 5 February 1971)
Liberal	Sir Alan Hulme (1907–1989) MP for Petrie (1963–1972)		Postmaster-General; Vice-President of the Executive Council
Liberal	Les Bury (1913–1986) MP for Wentworth (1956–1974)		Treasurer
Country	Ian Sinclair (born 1929) MP for New England (1963–1998)		Deputy Leader of the Country Party (from 5 February 1971); Minister for Shipping and Transport (to 5 February 1971); Minister assisting the Minister for Trade and Industry (to 5 February 1971); Minister for Primary Industry (from 5 February 1971)
Liberal	Sir Ken Anderson (1909–1985) Senator for New South Wales (1953–1975)		Leader of the Government in the Senate; Minister for Supply
Liberal	Malcolm Fraser (1930–2015) MP for Wannon (1955–1983)		Minister for Defence (to 8 March 1971)
Liberal	Reginald Swartz (1911–2006) MP for Darling Downs (1949–1972)		Minister for National Development
Liberal	Billy Snedden (1926–1987) MP for Bruce (1955–1983)		Minister for Labour and National Service; Leader of the House
Liberal	Nigel Bowen (1911–1994) MP for Parramatta (1964–1973)		Minister for Education and Science
Country	Peter Nixon (1928–2025) MP for Gippsland (1961–1983) (in Cabinet from 5 February 1971)		Minister for the Interior (to 5 February 1971); Minister for Shipping and Transport (from 5 February 1971)

== Outer ministry ==
Party	Minister	Portrait	Portfolio
Country	Charles Barnes (1901–1998) MP for McPherson (1958–1972)		Minister for External Territories
Liberal	James Forbes (1923–2019) MP for Barker (1956–1975)		Minister for Health
Liberal	Dame Annabelle Rankin (1908–1986) Senator for Queensland (1947–1971)		Minister for Housing
Liberal	Phillip Lynch (1933–1984) MP for Flinders (1966–1982)		Minister for Immigration; Minister assisting the Treasurer
Liberal	Bill Wentworth (1907–2003) MP for Mackellar (1949–1977)		Minister for Social Services; Minister in charge of Aboriginal Affairs under the Prime Minister
Liberal	Reg Wright (1905–1990) Senator for Tasmania (1950–1978)		Minister for Works; Minister in charge of Tourist Activities under the Minister for Trade and Industry
Liberal	Don Chipp (1925–2006) MP for Hotham (1969–1977)		Minister for Customs and Excise
Liberal	Bob Cotton (1915–2006) Senator for New South Wales (1965–1978)		Chief Government Whip in the Senate (to 25 November 1969); Minister for Civil Aviation
Country	Tom Drake-Brockman (1919–1992) Senator for Western Australia (1959–1978)		Minister for Air
Country	Mac Holten (1922–1996) MP for Indi (1958–1977)		Minister for Repatriation
Liberal	Tom Hughes (1923–2024) MP for Berowra (1969–1972)		Attorney-General
Liberal	James Killen (1925–2007) MP for Moreton (1955–1983)		Minister for the Navy
Liberal	Andrew Peacock (1939–2021) MP for Kooyong (1966–1994)		Minister for the Army; Minister assisting the Prime Minister
Country	Ralph Hunt (1928–2011) MP for Gwydir (1969–1989) (in Ministry from 5 February 1971)		Minister for the Interior (from 5 February 1971)

== See also ==
- First Gorton Ministry
