= Menzies government (1949–1966) =

Australian federal executive government

Menzies government

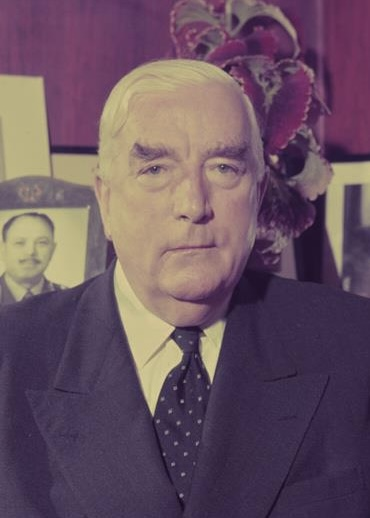

In office
- 19 December 1949 – 26 January 1966
- Monarch: George VI; Elizabeth II
- Prime Minister: Robert Menzies
- Deputy: Arthur Fadden (1949–1958); John McEwen (1958–1966)
- Party: Liberal; Country
- Status: Majority
- Origin: Won 1949 election
- Demise: Menzies' retirement
- Predecessor: Chifley government
- Successor: Holt government

The Menzies government (1949–1966) refers to the second period of federal executive government of Australia led by Prime Minister Robert Menzies. It was made up of members of a Liberal–Country Party coalition in the Australian Parliament from 1949 to 1966. Menzies led the Liberal–Country Coalition to election victories in 1949, 1951, 1954, 1955, 1958, 1961 and 1963. Robert Menzies was Australia's longest serving prime minister. He had served a previous term as prime minister as leader of the United Australia Party from 1939 to 1941. Although he would retire in 1966, his party would remain in office until 1972, an unprecedented 23 years of government from nine consecutive election victories.

== Background ==
=== United Australia Party ===
The United Australia Party had been formed as a new conservative alliance in 1931, with Labor defector Joseph Lyons as its leader and John Latham, hitherto leader of the Nationalist Party of Australia as his deputy. The stance of Lyons and another former Labor minister, James Fenton, against the more radical proposals of the Labor movement to deal the Great Depression had attracted the support of prominent Australian conservatives. In March 1931, though still a member of the ALP, Lyons supported a no confidence motion against the Scullin Labor government and the UAP was formed from a coalition of citizens' groups and with the support of the Nationalist Party. In November 1931, Lang Labor dissidents chose to challenge the Scullin Labor government and align with the UAP to pass a 'no confidence' and the government fell.

With Australia still suffering the effects of the Great Depression, the newly formed United Australia Party won a landslide victory at 19 December 1931 Election, and the UAP commenced its first term in government in January 1932. The Lyons government won three consecutive elections, pursuing a conservative fiscal policy of balanced budgets and debt reduction, while stewarding Australia out of the Depression.

Lyons death in April 1939 saw Robert Menzies assume the prime ministership on the eve of World War II. After a decade in office, the party had declined in popularity, and faced the demands of war in a shaky coalition with the Country Party. Forced to rely on the support of independents following the 1940 election, Menzies resigned in 1941, whereupon the UAP was unable to replace him with a suitable leader and allowed the leader of the junior coalition party, Arthur Fadden to take office. The Fadden government lasted just 40 days, before the independents crossed the floor bringing Labor's John Curtin to the prime ministership just prior to the outbreak of the Pacific War.

Labor's John Curtin proved a big war time leader and the Curtin government won in a landslide in the 1943 election. In the aftermath of this defeat, the UAP began to disintegrate, and Australian conservatives and anti-socialist liberals looked to form a new political movement to counter the Australian Labor Party.

=== Foundation of Liberal Party ===
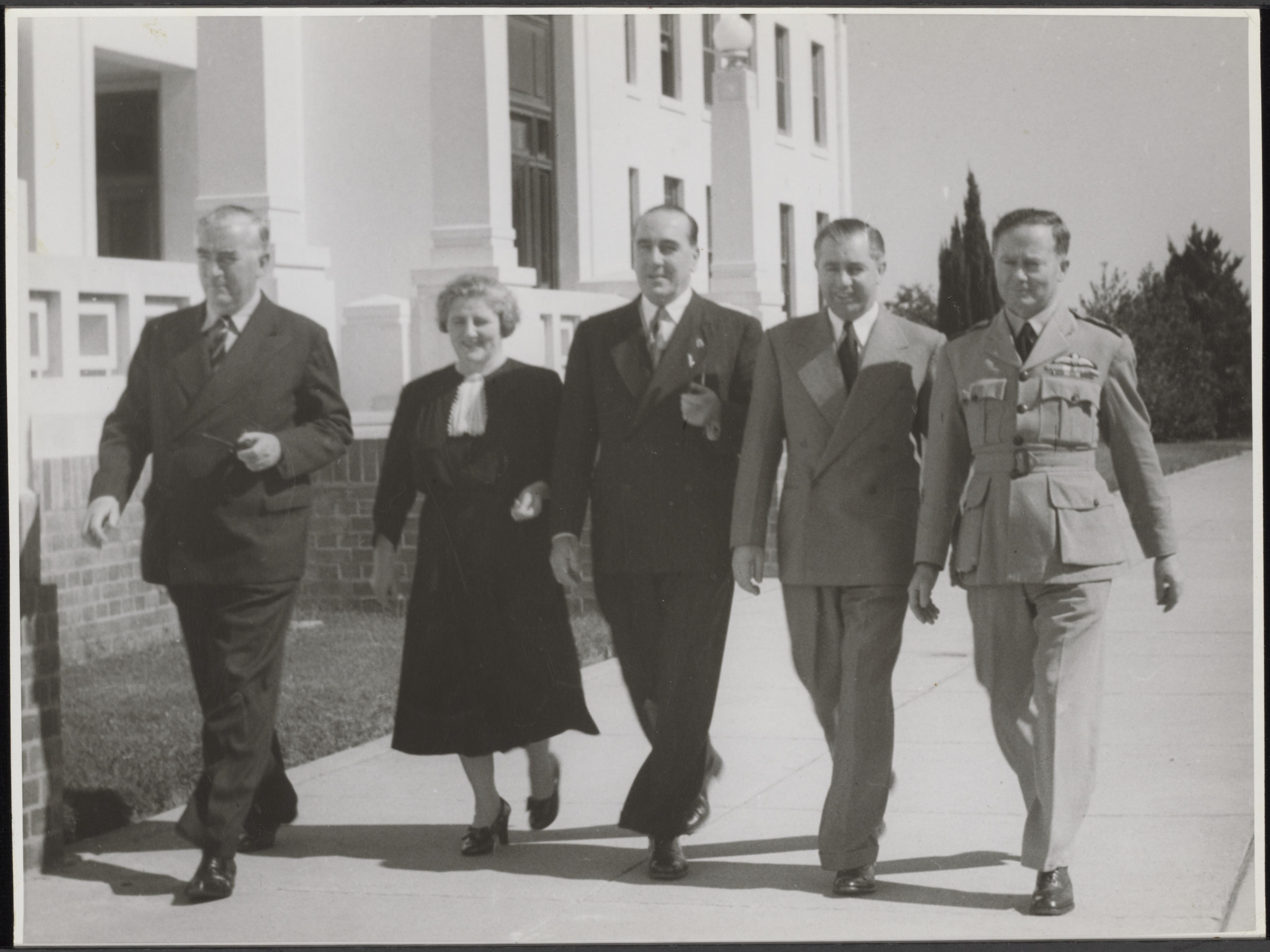
Sir Robert Menzies, Dame Enid Lyons (the first woman member of an Australian Cabinet), Sir Eric Harrison, Harold Holt (Menzies' successor) and an Airforceman in 1946.

Fourteen political parties had allied to form the United Australia Party, but disenchantment with the United Australia Party was now widespread. A group of New South Wales members had formed the new "Democratic Party". This new group looked to Robert Menzies to provide leadership. Menzies called a conference of conservative parties and other groups opposed to the ruling Australian Labor Party which met in Canberra on 13 October 1944, and again in Albury in December 1944. The formation of the party was formally announced at Sydney Town Hall on 31 August 1945.

Menzies had been prime minister as leader of the United Australia Party from 1939 to 1941. From 1942 onward, Menzies had maintained his public profile with his series of "Forgotten People" radio talks, similar to US President Franklin D. Roosevelt's "fireside chats" of the 1930s, in which he spoke of the middle class as the "backbone of Australia" but as nevertheless having been "taken for granted" by political parties and of being effectively powerless because of lack of wealth on the one hand, and lack of organisation on the other.

Outlining his vision for a new political movement in 1944, Menzies said:

"...[W]hat we must look for, and it is a matter of desperate importance to our society, is a true revival of liberal thought which will work for social justice and security, for national power and national progress, and for the full development of the individual citizen, though not through the dull and deadening process of socialism.

Menzies wanted the new party to be independent of interest groups like big business and so sought to organise a structure under which the Party would only receive money from individuals in small amounts, rather than from trade groups or associations.

After only modest gains against Labor at the 1946 election, Menzies saw out another three years as opposition leader – opposing Labor's efforts to nationalise Australia's banks, criticising petrol rationing and speaking out against Communism in the early stages of the Cold War. Menzies characterised the incumbent Chifley government as "socialist". With Arthur Fadden of the Country Party as his deputy, Menzies led the Liberal-Country Party Coalition to victory at the 1949 election. He was now to become the longest serving prime minister in Australian history.

== Terms in office ==
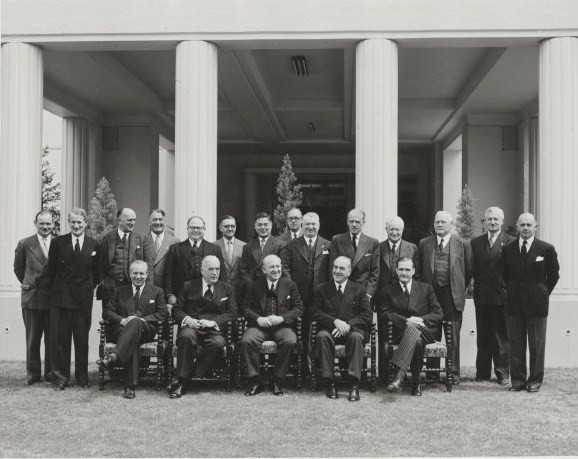
Fifth Menzies Ministry in 1951.

Following victory in the 1949 election, the Menzies government secured a double dissolution election for 28 April 1951, after the Australian Labor Party-controlled Senate refused to pass the Menzies' banking legislation. The Liberal-Country Coalition was returned with a reduced majority in the Lower House, but with control of the Senate. The Government was returned in the aftermath of the Petrov affair in the 1954 election and again after the formation of the anti-Communist Democratic Labor Party split the Australian Labor Party early in 1955 and Australia went to the polls in December 1955. John McEwen replaced Arthur Fadden as leader of the Country Party in March 1958 and the Menzies-McEwen Coalition was returned again at elections in November 1958 – their third victory against Labor's H V Evatt. The Coalition was narrowly returned against Labor's Arthur Calwell in the December 1961 election, in the midst of a credit squeeze. Menzies stood for office for the last time in the November 1963 election, again defeating Calwell, with the Coalition winning back its losses in the House of Representatives. Menzies went on to resign from parliament on 26 January 1966.

Menzies' 1949 Cabinet had the leader of the Country Party, Arthur Fadden, as the treasurer and deputy prime minister and included Dame Enid Lyons as the first woman to serve in an Australian Cabinet.

=== Economy and trade ===
After winning office in 1949, Menzies fulfilled his promises to end rationing of butter, tea and petrol and provide a 5 shilling endowment for first born children, as well as for others.

Australia experienced a prolonged economic boom during the Menzies years. Menzies remained a staunch supporter of links to the monarchy and British Commonwealth but formalised an alliance with the United States and launched post-war trade with Japan, beginning a growth of Australian exports of coal, iron ore and mineral resources that would steadily climb until Japan became Australia's largest trading partner. John McEwen, as minister for commerce and for trade, negotiated the Agreement on Commerce between Australia and Japan which was signed in July 1957. The agreement carried political risk for the Menzies government, because memories of atrocities perpetrated on Australians by Japan in World War II were still strong in the community. Britain meanwhile was negotiating entry into the European Economic Community in the early 1960s with major implications for Australian trade, which had previously enjoyed preferential treatment in the UK. McEwen was active in maintaining tariff protections for agriculture, mining and manufacturing, which he believed would sustain employment and contribute to national defence.

In the Menzies government, McEwen pursued what became known as "McEwenism" – a policy of high tariff protection for the manufacturing industry, so that industry would not challenge the continuing high tariffs on imported raw materials, which benefited farmers but pushed up industry's costs. This policy was a part (some argue the foundation) of what became known as the "Australian settlement" which promoted high wages, industrial development, government intervention in industry (Australian governments traditionally owned banks and insurance companies and the railways and through policies designed to assist particular industries) and decentralisation.

In the early 1950s, external affairs minister Percy Spender helped to establish the Colombo Plan for providing economic aid to underdeveloped nations in Australia's region. Under the scheme, many future Asian leaders studied in Australia.

In 1951, the top marginal tax rate for incomes above £10,000 what is equivalent to $425,000 today, was 75 per cent under Menzies. from 1955 until the mid-1980s the top marginal tax rate was 67 per cent.

Other than blocking the nationalisation of the Banking system by the Labor Party, Menzies sold the Commonwealth Oil Refineries to the Anglo-Iranian Oil Company. The wool industry remained a mainstay of the economy through the 1950s, indeed it was said that the Australian economy "rode on the sheep's back". Nevertheless, important developments in further industries occurred, such as the construction of Australia's first commercial oil field at Moonie, Queensland in 1961.

In 1960, the government split the Commonwealth Bank into the Commonwealth Banking Corporation and the Reserve Bank of Australia.

While for most Australians the Menzies era was an era of prosperity, the nation experienced high inflation during the early years of Menzies' rule. The Korean War increased demand for commodities. Wool in particular boomed, leading to a rise in growers' incomes, but also to inflation. The Arbitration Court helped stabilise wages from 1953. From 1959 to 1960 Australia experienced something of a boom, spurred by overseas speculators and high domestic spending – resulting in recession by 1961, following a "horror" mini-budget designed to slow the economy. Unemployment reaching 2.1% (at that time considered "high") and Menzies went on to win the 1961 election by just one seat. Following the election, Menzies and Treasurer Harold Holt introduced another mini-budget designed to spur growth and the economy was in recovery.

=== Foreign affairs ===
The Menzies era saw immense regional changes, with post-war reconstruction and the withdrawal of European Powers and the British Empire from the Far East (including independence for India and Indonesia); the consolidation of Communist regimes in China, North Vietnam, North Korea and Communist insurgencies elsewhere.

==== Cold War ====
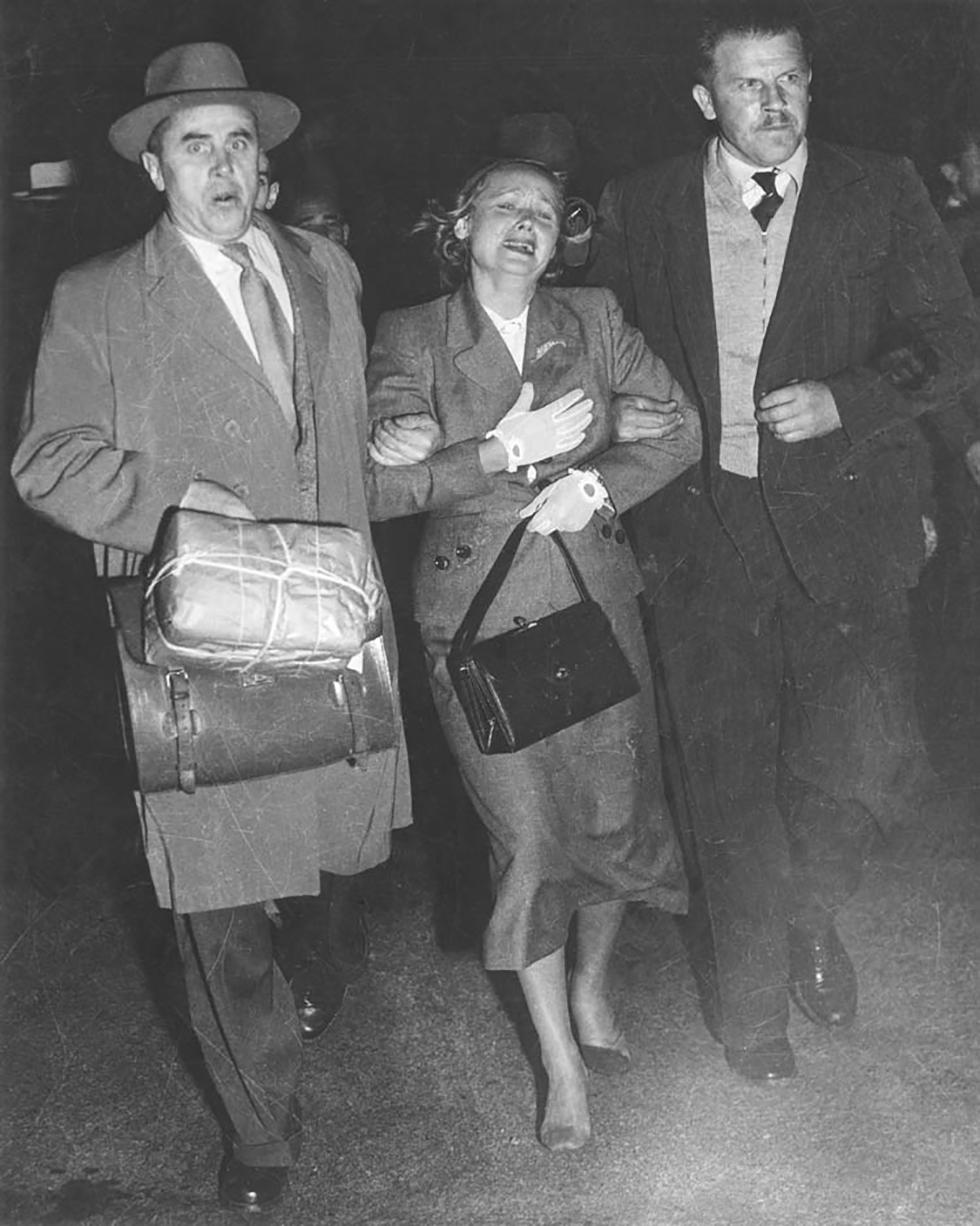
Cold War politics: Evdokia Petrova at Sydney Airport, being escorted to a waiting plane by two armed KGB agents during the Petrov Affair. Menzies intervened to prevent her forced removal to the USSR following the defection of her husband.

Menzies was firmly anti-Communist. In 1950 his government committed troops to the Korean War and attempted to ban the Communist Party of Australia. Menzies secured passage of the Communist Party Dissolution Bill through Parliament in June 1950. Although it had popular support, for many it went too far in such measures as allowing the disqualifying of declared Communists from public offices, or industries considered vital to defence. The Bill had the support of anti-Communist Labor Senators, and so passed through Parliament. Early in 1951 however, the High Court declared the Act invalid for unconstitutionally interfering with civil liberties and property rights. Following the 1951 election, Menzies held a referendum seeking power for the Federal Parliament to legislate "With respect to Communists or Communism as the Parliament considers to be necessary or expedient for the defence or security of the Commonwealth". Labor leader H V Evatt campaigned against the proposal and the referendum was narrowly defeated.

In 1951, during the early stages of the Cold War, Menzies spoke of the possibility of a looming third world war. Soviet diplomat Vladimir Petrov and his wife defected from the Soviet embassy in Canberra in 1954, revealing evidence of Russian spying activities and Menzies called a Royal Commission. The Labor Party split over concerns about the influence of the Communist Party over the Trade Union movement, leading to the foundation of the breakaway Democratic Labor Party(DLP) whose preferences supported the Liberal and Country Party, in return for key concessions, like funding for Catholic schools. The new Party never won a House of Representatives seat, but often held the balance of power in the Senate.

==== Treaties and defence ====
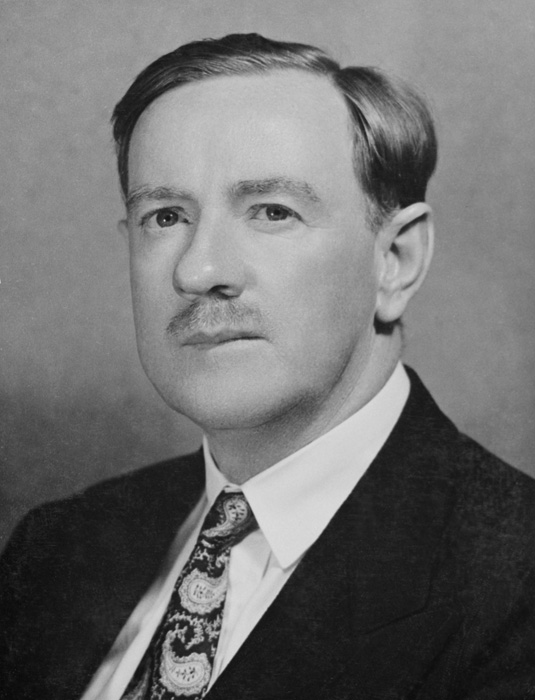
Sir Percy Spender negotiated the ANZUS Treaty alliance with the United States and Colombo Plan for aid and development assistance for Asia.

Australia signed the official Peace Treaty with Japan in San Francisco in 1951, but by this point, the world had entered a new and tense period in international relations – the Cold War. With the memory of Japanese expansionism fresh in the Australian experience, and with the commencement of the Cold War seeing the Soviet Union dominating Eastern Europe, the Chinese Communist Party winning the Chinese Civil War in 1949 and Communist North Korea invading South Korea in 1950, Australia sought security outside its traditional allegiance to Britain.

In June 1950, Communist North Korea invaded South Korea. The Menzies government responded to a United States led United Nations Security Council request for military aid for South Korea and diverted forces from occupied Japan to begin Australia's involvement in the Korean War. The entry of Communist China into the war saw allied forces driven backwards down the peninsula. After fighting to a bitter standstill, the UN and North Korea signed a ceasefire agreement in July 1953. Australian forces had participated in such major battles as Kapyong and Maryang San. 17,000 Australians had served and casualties amounted to more than 1,500, of whom 339 were killed.

Analysts voiced fear of the "domino theory", according to which South East Asia would fall to Communism state by state. In defence policy, Menzies moved Australia to a policy of "forward defence" and committed troops against Communists insurgencies in South East Asia – the Malayan Emergency, and Indonesia's policy of Confrontation and, near the end of Menzies' prime ministership, the early stages of the Vietnam War.

In 1951, the first call ups were made under the National Service Act, which provided for compulsory military training of 18-year-old men, who were then to remain on the Army Reserve for five years. The Scheme trained 227,000 men between 1951 and 1960 (when it ended). In 1952, a program of British nuclear weapons testing began in Australia. The program was based at Maralinga, South Australia from 1954 until 1963 (and was later the subject of a Royal Commission investigation). National Service was reintroduced in 1964, in the form of the National Service Lottery, under which Marbles of birth dates were drawn from a lottery barrel. The Scheme remained in place until 1972 and saw 63,000 men conscripted.

The Menzies government entered the first formal military alliance outside of the British Commonwealth with the signing of the ANZUS Treaty between Australia, New Zealand and the United States in San Francisco in 1951. External Affairs Minister Percy Spender had put forward the proposal to work along similar lines to the NATO Alliance. The Treaty declared that any attack on one of the three parties in the Pacific area would be viewed as a threat to each, and that the common danger would be met in accordance with each nation's constitutional processes.

In 1954, the Menzies government signed the South East Asia Collective Defence Treaty (SEATO) as a South East Asian counterpart to NATO.

In 1959, Australia signed the Antarctic Treaty agreeing a legal framework for the management of Antarctica.

==== Suez Crisis ====
Robert Menzies' was despatched to Cairo by an 18 nation committee to act as chairman in negotiations with Egyptian President Nasser following his 1956 nationalisation of the Suez Canal during the Suez Crisis. Western powers had built the trade canal, but Egypt was now seeking to exclude them from a role in its ownership or management. Menzies felt that Nasser's actions threatened Australia's interests as a trading nation and an ally of Britain.

Menzies' 7 September official communique to Nasser presented a case for compensation for the Suez Canal Company and the "establishment of principles" for the future use of the Canal that would ensure that it would "continue to be an international waterway operated free of politics or national discrimination, and with financial structure so secure and an international confidence so high that an expanding and improving future for the Canal could be guaranteed" and called for a Convention to recognise Egyptian sovereignty of the Canal, but for the establishment of an international body to run the canal. Nasser saw such measures as a "derogation from Egyptian sovereignty" and rejected Menzies' proposals.

Menzies hinted to Nasser that Britain and France might use force to resolve the crisis, but United States President Eisenhower openly opposed the use of force and Menzies left Egypt without success. Menzies voiced support for the subsequent Anglo-French military operation in Egypt, which resulted in a humiliating withdrawal and the resignation of the British prime minister, Anthony Eden.

=== Commonwealth of Nations ===
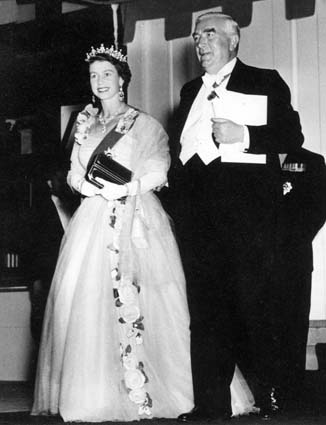
Queen Elizabeth II with Menzies at an official function during her first visit to Australia in 1954. Popular support for the Monarchy in Australia was high during the Menzies era.

The Menzies era saw the sun set on the British Empire and the expansion of the Commonwealth of Nations as its successor. Menzies and Australians in general remained deeply loyal to the institution of the Monarchy in Australia and the 1954 Royal Tour by Queen Elizabeth II and her consort, Prince Philip was greeted by wild enthusiasm across the continent. Harold Macmillan then became the first British prime minister to visit in 1958.

The first tour by a reigning monarch saw her cover 10,000 miles by air and 2,000 miles by ground. On a later Royal Tour in 1963, Menzies famously and effusively praised Queen Elizabeth by quoting an Elizabethan era poem: "I did but see her passing by and yet I love her till I die".

As decolonisation proceeded around the British Empire, the Menzies government followed Britain's lead and imposed economic sanctions on Southern Rhodesia when the Ian Smith government had declared self-government to maintain white minority rule.

=== Society and welfare ===
The Menzies government instigated a series of important reforms to immigration laws, which resulted in the erosion of the restrictions of the unofficial White Australia Policy which had privileged British migrants over all others since the time of Australian Federation in 1901 and abolished restrictions on voting rights for Aboriginal people, which had persisted in some jurisdictions.

=== Health ===
In 1953 the government introduced a number of reforms to the existing provision of health services. These reforms were the basis for the future expansion in the provision of public health and aged care services. The first major health reform was the creation of a voluntary, contributory national health scheme through the National Health Act 1953. This was followed by the Aged Persons Homes Act 1954, the Aged and Disabled Persons Care Act 1954 and the Home Nursing Subsidy Act 1956. National subsidies for residential aged care services commenced in 1963. In implementing these reforms the Menzies government promoted the role of private insurance funds and private health care providers (mainly charitable and religious based organisations), rather than adopting the model adopted in the United Kingdom with the introduction of the National Health Service in the 1940s.

On 1 March 1960, with the National Health Act No. 72 1959, the Menzies government introduced the new Pharmaceutical Benefits Scheme, which expanded the range of prescribed medicines subsidised by the government.

==== Marriage and divorce ====
Through the Matrimonial Causes Act 1959, the Menzies government introduced a uniform divorce law across Australia and recognised "no-fault" divorce by allowing a specified period of separation as sufficient grounds for a divorce. It was eventually replaced by the Family Law Act 1975. In 1961, the Menzies government used the powers granted by section 51(xxi) of the constitution to pass the Marriage Act 1961, which gave the federal government exclusive jurisdiction over the formation of marriages. It remains in force although it has been amended on several occasions.

==== Immigration ====
Beginning in 1949, Immigration Minister Harold Holt decided to allow 800 non-European war refugees to remain in Australia, and Japanese war brides to be admitted to Australia. In 1950 External Affairs Minister Percy Spender instigated the Colombo Plan, under which students from Asian countries were admitted to study at Australian universities, then in 1957 non-Europeans with 15 years' residence in Australia were allowed to become citizens. In a watershed legal reform, a 1958 revision of the Migration Act introduced a simpler system for entry and abolished the "dictation test" which had permitted the exclusion of migrants on the basis of their ability to take down a dictation offered in any European language. Immigration Minister, Sir Alexander Downer, announced that 'distinguished and highly qualified Asians' might immigrate. Restrictions continued to be relaxed through the 1960s in the lead up to the Holt government's watershed Migration Act, 1966.

This was despite in a discussion with radio 2UE's Stewart Lamb in 1955 he was a defender of the White Australia Policy:

(Menzies) "I don't want to see reproduced in Australia the kind of problem they have in South Africa or in America or increasingly in Great Britain. I think it's been a very good policy and it's been of great value to us and most of the criticism of it that I've ever heard doesn't come from these oriental countries it comes from wandering Australians.

(Lamb) "For these years of course in the past Sir Robert you have been described as a racist."

(Menzies) "Have I?"

(Lamb) "I have read this, yes."

(Menzies) "Well if I were not described as a racist I'd be the only public man who hasn't been."

==== Aboriginal affairs ====
Campaigns for Aboriginal rights gathered pace in Australia during the Menzies era. When Menzies assumed office, Aboriginal people were still excluded from voting in Federal elections in Queensland and West Australia. In 1949, the Menzies Government legislated to ensure that all Aboriginal ex-servicemen should have the right to vote. In 1961 a Parliamentary Committee was established to investigate and report to the Parliament on Aboriginal voting rights and in 1962, Menzies' Commonwealth Electoral Act provided that all Indigenous Australians should have the right to enrol and vote at federal elections.

In 1959, Bill Wentworth put forth a proposal to Cabinet for the establishment of an Australian Institute of Aboriginal Studies, arguing for a more comprehensive approach by the government to recording Aboriginal and Torres Strait Islander peoples and cultures. A Cabinet sub-committee was formed in 1960, and appointed anthropologist WEH Stanner to organise a conference to consider ‘the state of Aboriginal studies in Australia.’ The Institute, now known as the Australian Institute of Aboriginal and Torres Strait Islander Studies (AIATSIS), was established by an Act of Parliament in 1964, and set about systematically recording the language, song, art, material culture, ceremonial life and social structure of Aboriginal people.

In 1963, Yolngu people petitioned Parliament, with the famous Yirrkala bark petitions, after the government excised land from the Arnhem Land reserve, without consulting the traditional owners.

=== Education, science and infrastructure ===
The Menzies government extended Federal involvement in education and developed the city of Canberra as the national capital. Menzies introduced the Commonwealth scholarship scheme in 1951, to cover fees and pay a generous means-tested allowance for bright students from lower socioeconomic groups. In 1956, a committee headed by Sir Keith Murray was established to inquire into the financial plight of Australia's universities, and Menzies' pumped funds into the sector under conditions which preserved the autonomy of universities.

In 1954, the government established Mawson Station in Antarctica as Australia's first permanent base on the continent and in 1957, Davis Station was constructed.

In 1956, Television in Australia began broadcasting. In a significant step, Menzies opted for a hybrid system, licensing both commercial and public broadcasters.

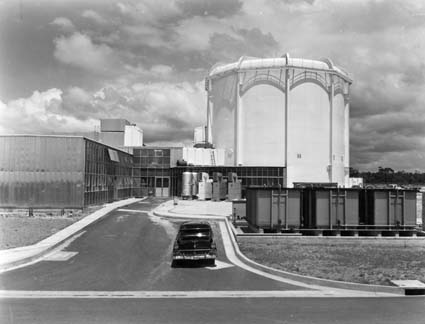
Lucas Heights Nuclear Reactor in 1958.

The Australian Atomic Energy Commission (now Australian Nuclear Science and Technology Organisation) was set up under the Atomic Energy Act in 1953 and Lucas Heights Nuclear Reactor commenced operation in 1958.

From 1960 the Government allowed the United States to establish satellite tracking stations in the A.C.T. – resulting in the construction of Orroral Creek, Honeysuckle Creek and Tidbinbilla. The National Astronomical Observatory, a 64-metre radio telescope at Parkes was opened in 1961. These facilities would prove crucial to the United States Lunar Program. Australia joined the International Telecommunications Satellite Consortium in 1964.

In 1960, money was set aside for the construction of the long-delayed Lake Burley Griffin – the original centre-piece of the design for Canberra.

In 1962, an interstate coaxial cable linking the Eastern seaboard cities was completed. International direct dial was achieved with the opening of the Commonwealth Pacific Cable in 1963, in a scheme designed to link the Commonwealth by phone.

=== Menzies era ===
In his last address to the Liberal Party Federal Council in 1964, Menzies reflected on the "Liberal Creed" as follows:

As the etymology of our name 'Liberal' indicates, we have stood for freedom. We have realised that men and women are not just ciphers in a calculation, but are individual human beings whose individual welfare and development must be the main concern of government.... We have learned that the right answer is to set the individual free, to aim at equality of opportunity, to protect the individual against oppression, to create a society in which rights and duties are recognized and made effective."

Though often characterised as a "conservative" period in Australian history, the Menzies era was a period of sustained economic boom with rapid technological advance and Australia experienced the beginnings of sweeping social change – with the arrivals of rock and roll music and television in the 1950s. Melbourne hosted the Olympics and iconic Australian performers like Barry Humphries, Johnny O'Keefe and Slim Dusty emerged in the arts scene during the 1950s. Though support for the monarchy in Australia remained strong, Australia's cultural and political identity began a slow shift away from its traditional British allegiance.

==== Retirement of Menzies ====
Menzies was Knighted in 1963, and was honoured in 1965 by being appointed to succeed Winston Churchill as Constable of Dover Castle and Warden of the Cinque Ports. Menzies' second period as prime minister lasted a record sixteen years and seven consecutive election victories and ended in his voluntary retirement on 26 January 1966, aged 71. Harold Holt replaced the retiring Menzies in 1966 and the Holt government went on to win 82 seats to Labor's 41 in the 1966 Election.

== See also ==
- History of Australia
- History of Australia since 1945
- Fourth Menzies Ministry
- Fifth Menzies Ministry
- Sixth Menzies Ministry
- Seventh Menzies Ministry
- Eighth Menzies Ministry
- Ninth Menzies Ministry
- Tenth Menzies Ministry
