= Sixth Menzies ministry =

36th ministry of government of Australia

- 36th Ministry of Australia

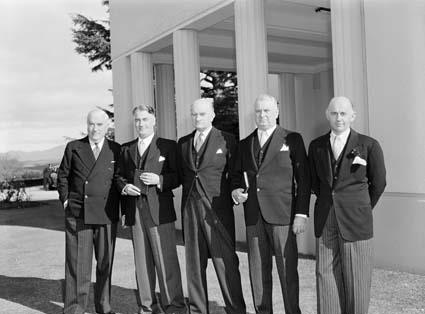
- Members of the Sixth Menzies ministry at their swearing-in.
- Date formed: 9 July 1954
- Date dissolved: 11 January 1956

People and organisations
- Monarch: Elizabeth II
- Governor-General: Sir William Slim
- Prime Minister: Robert Menzies
- No. of ministers: 21
- Member party: Liberal–Country coalition
- Status in legislature: Coalition majority government
- Opposition party: Labor
- Opposition leader: H. V. Evatt

History
- Election: 29 May 1954
- Outgoing election: 10 December 1955
- Legislature term: 21st
- Predecessor: Fifth Menzies ministry
- Successor: Seventh Menzies ministry

The Sixth Menzies ministry (Liberal–Country Coalition) was the 36th ministry of the Government of Australia led by the country's 12th Prime Minister, Robert Menzies. The Sixth Menzies ministry succeeded the Fifth Menzies ministry, which dissolved on 9 July 1954 following the federal election that took place in May. It was then replaced by the Seventh Menzies ministry on 11 January 1956 following the 1955 federal election.

Paul Hasluck, who died in 1993, was the last surviving member of the Sixth Menzies Ministry; Hasluck was also the last surviving member of the Fifth Menzies Ministry. John McEwen was the last surviving Country minister.

== Ministry ==
Party	Minister	Portrait	Portfolio
Liberal	Robert Menzies (1894–1978) MP for Kooyong (1934–1966)		Prime Minister; Leader of the Liberal Party
Country	Sir Arthur Fadden (1894–1973) MP for McPherson (1949–1958)		Leader of the Country Party; Treasurer
Liberal	Sir Eric Harrison (1892–1974) MP for Wentworth (1931–1956)		Deputy Leader of the Liberal Party; Minister for Defence Production; Vice-President of the Executive Council; Minister for the Army (from 7 November 1955); Minister for the Navy (from 11 July 1955); Leader of the House
Liberal	Harold Holt (1908–1967) MP for Higgins (1949–1967)		Minister for Labour and National Service; Minister for Immigration
Country	John McEwen (1900–1980) MP for Murray (1949–1971)		Deputy Leader of the Country Party; Minister for Commerce and Agriculture
Liberal	Richard Casey (1890–1976) MP for La Trobe (1949–1960)		Minister for External Affairs; Minister in charge of the Commonwealth Scientific and Industrial Research Organisation
Liberal	Philip McBride (1892–1982) MP for Wakefield (1946–1958)		Minister for Defence
Liberal	John Spicer (1899–1978) Senator for Victoria (1950–1956)		Attorney-General; Minister for Shipping and Transport (from 14 September 1955 to 27 September 1955)
Liberal	Neil O'Sullivan (1900–1968) Senator for Queensland (1947–1962)		Leader of the Government in the Senate; Minister for Trade and Customs
Liberal	Howard Beale (1898–1983) MP for Parramatta (1946–1958)		Minister for Supply
Liberal	George McLeay (1892–1955) Senator for South Australia (1950–1955)		Minister for Shipping and Transport (to 14 September 1955)
Country	Larry Anthony (1897–1957) MP for Richmond (1937–1957)		Postmaster-General
Country	Sir Earle Page (1880–1961) MP for Cowper (1919–1961)		Minister for Health
Liberal	Josiah Francis (1890–1964) MP for Moreton (1922–1955)		Minister for the Army (to 7 November 1955); Minister for the Navy (to 11 July 1955)
Liberal	Bill Spooner MM (1897–1966) Senator for New South Wales (1950–1965)		Minister for National Development
Country	Walter Cooper (1888–1973) Senator for Queensland (1935–1968)		Minister for Repatriation
Liberal	Paul Hasluck (1905–1993) MP for Curtin (1949–1969)		Minister for Territories
Liberal	Wilfrid Kent Hughes (1895–1970) MP for Chisholm (1949–1970)		Minister for the Interior; Minister for Works
Liberal	William McMahon (1908–1988) MP for Lowe (1949–1982)		Minister for Social Services
Liberal	Athol Townley (1905–1963) MP for Denison (1949–1963)		Minister for Air; Minister for Civil Aviation
Liberal	Shane Paltridge (1910-1966) Senator for Western Australia (1951-1966) (in Ministry from 27 September 1955)		Minister for Shipping and Transport (from 27 September 1955)
