= Fifth Menzies ministry =

35th ministry of government of Australia

- 35th Ministry of Australia

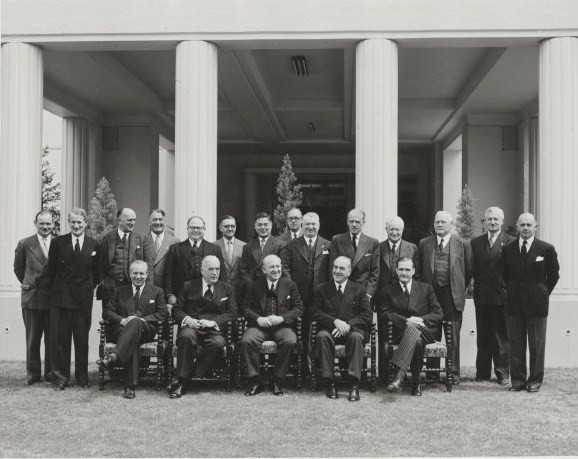
- The Fifth Menzies ministry at their swearing-in
- Date formed: 11 May 1951
- Date dissolved: 9 July 1954

People and organisations
- Monarch: George VI; Elizabeth II
- Governor-General: (Sir) William McKell; Sir William Slim
- Prime Minister: Robert Menzies
- No. of ministers: 20
- Member party: Liberal–Country coalition
- Status in legislature: Coalition majority government
- Opposition party: Labor
- Opposition leader: Ben Chifley; H. V. Evatt

History
- Election: 28 April 1951
- Outgoing election: 29 May 1954
- Legislature term: 20th
- Predecessor: Fourth Menzies ministry
- Successor: Sixth Menzies ministry

The Fifth Menzies ministry (Liberal–Country Coalition) was the 35th ministry of the Government of Australia. It was led by the country's 12th Prime Minister, Robert Menzies. The Fifth Menzies ministry succeeded the Fourth Menzies ministry, which dissolved on 11 May 1951 following the federal election that took place in April. The ministry was replaced by the Sixth Menzies ministry on 9 July 1954 following the 1954 federal election.

Paul Hasluck, who died in 1993, was the last surviving member of the Fifth Menzies Ministry; Hasluck was also the last surviving member of the Sixth Menzies ministry. John McEwen was the last surviving Country minister.

== Ministry ==
Party	Minister	Portrait	Portfolio
Liberal	Robert Menzies (1894–1978) MP for Kooyong (1934–1966)		Prime Minister; Leader of the Liberal Party
Country	Sir Arthur Fadden (1894–1973) MP for McPherson (1949–1958)		Leader of the Country Party; Treasurer
Liberal	Sir Eric Harrison (1892–1974) MP for Wentworth (1931–1956)		Deputy Leader of the Liberal Party; Minister for Defence Production; Vice-President of the Executive Council; Leader of the House
Liberal	Harold Holt (1908–1967) MP for Higgins (1949–1967)		Minister for Labour and National Service; Minister for Immigration
Country	John McEwen (1900–1980) MP for Murray (1949–1971)		Deputy Leader of the Country Party; Minister for Commerce and Agriculture
Liberal	Richard Casey (1890–1976) MP for La Trobe (1949–1960)		Minister for External Affairs; Minister in charge of the Commonwealth Scientific and Industrial Research Organisation
Liberal	Philip McBride (1892–1982) MP for Wakefield (1946–1958)		Minister for Defence; Minister for Air (to 17 July 1951); Minister for the Navy (to 17 July 1951)
Liberal	John Spicer (1899–1978) Senator for Victoria (1950–1956)		Attorney-General
Liberal	Neil O'Sullivan (1900–1968) Senator for Queensland (1947–1962)		Leader of the Government in the Senate; Minister for Trade and Customs
Liberal	Howard Beale (1898–1983) MP for Parramatta (1946–1958)		Minister for Supply
Liberal	George McLeay (1892–1955) Senator for South Australia (1950–1955)		Minister for Shipping and Transport
Country	Larry Anthony (1897–1957) MP for Richmond (1937–1957)		Postmaster-General; Minister for Civil Aviation
Country	Sir Earle Page (1880–1961) MP for Cowper (1919–1961)		Minister for Health
Liberal	Josiah Francis (1890–1964) MP for Moreton (1922–1955)		Minister for the Army
Liberal	Bill Spooner (1897–1966) Senator for New South Wales (1950–1965)		Minister for National Development
Country	Walter Cooper (1888–1973) Senator for Queensland (1935–1968)		Minister for Repatriation
Liberal	Paul Hasluck (1905–1993) MP for Curtin (1949–1969)		Minister for Territories
Liberal	Wilfrid Kent Hughes (1895–1970) MP for Chisholm (1949–1970)		Minister for the Interior; Minister for Works and Housing (to 4 June 1952); Minister for Works (from 4 June 1952)
Liberal	Athol Townley (1905–1963) MP for Denison (1949–1963)		Minister for Social Services
Liberal	William McMahon (1908–1988) MP for Lowe (1949–1982) (in Ministry from 7 July 1951)		Minister for Air (from 17 July 1951); Minister for the Navy (from 17 July 1951)
