= Bill Spooner (politician) =

Australian politician

The Right Honourable Sir William Spooner KCMG, MM
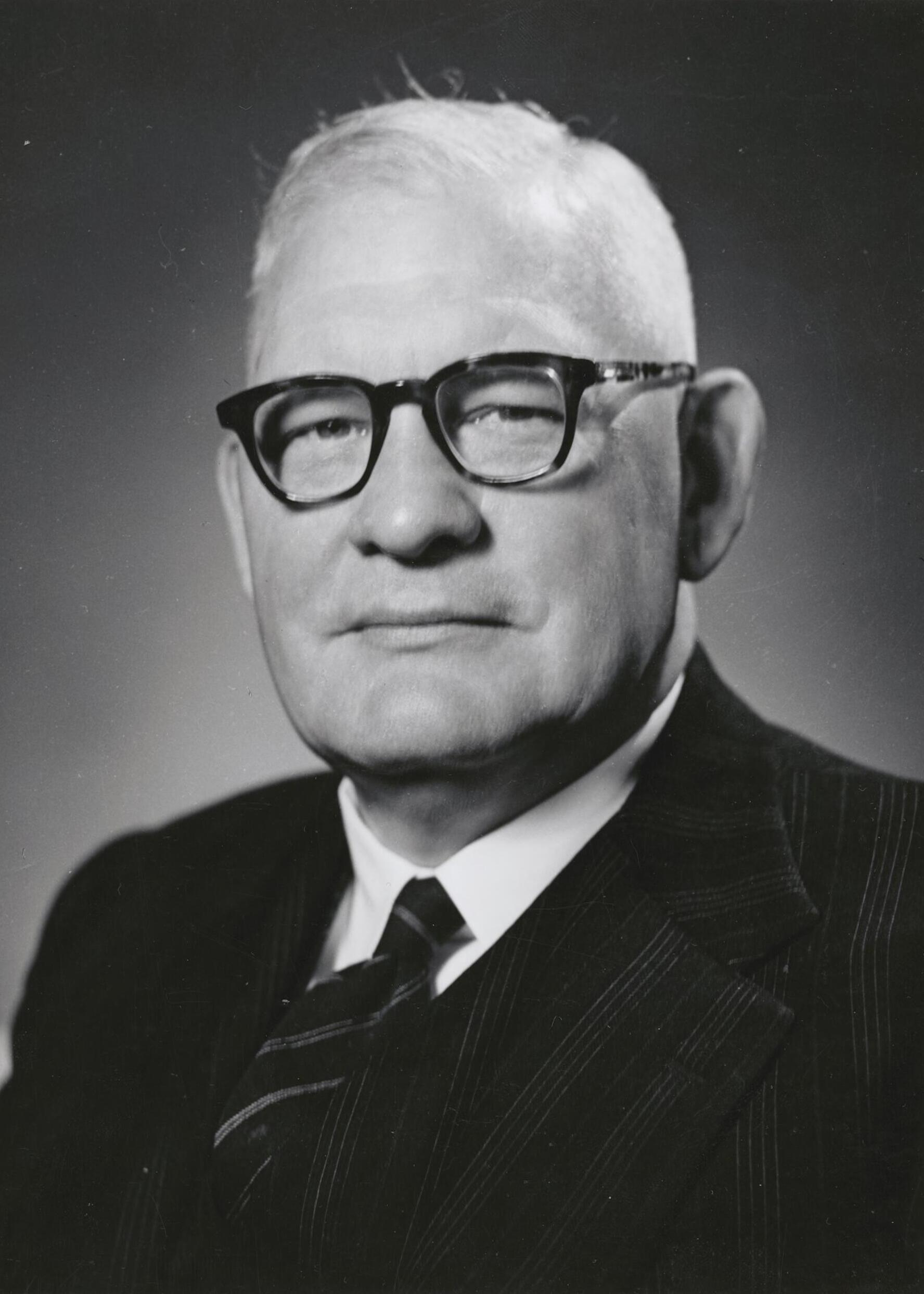

Leader of the Government in the Senate
- In office 8 December 1958 – 2 June 1964
- Prime Minister: Robert Menzies
- Preceded by: Neil O'Sullivan
- Succeeded by: Shane Paltridge

Minister for National Development
- In office 11 May 1951 – 10 June 1964
- Prime Minister: Robert Menzies
- Preceded by: Richard Casey
- Succeeded by: David Fairbairn

Minister for Social Services
- In office 19 December 1949 – 11 May 1951
- Prime Minister: Robert Menzies
- Preceded by: Nick McKenna
- Succeeded by: Athol Townley

Senator for New South Wales
- In office 22 February 1950 – 14 July 1965
- Succeeded by: Bob Cotton

Personal details
- Born: 23 December 1897 Surry Hills, New South Wales, Australia
- Died: 14 July 1966 (aged 68) Manly, New South Wales, Australia
- Party: Liberal
- Spouse: Vera Bogle (m. 1924)
- Relations: Eric Spooner (brother)
- Occupation: Accountant

Military service
- Allegiance: Australia
- Branch/service: Australian Imperial Force (1915–18); Australian Flying Corps (1918–19)
- Years of service: 1915–1919
- Rank: Second Lieutenant
- Unit: 5th Field Ambulance (1915–17)
- Battles/wars: First World War
- Awards: Military Medal

Sir William Henry Spooner, KCMG, MM (23 December 1897 – 14 July 1966) was an Australian politician who served as a Senator for New South Wales from 1950 to 1965, representing the Liberal Party. He was a senior minister in the Menzies government, serving as Minister for Social Services from 1949 to 1951 and then Minister for National Development from 1951 to 1964. He was Leader of the Government in the Senate from 1958 to 1964.

== Early life ==
Spooner was born in Surry Hills, Sydney, New South Wales, the fifth child of Maud Ann (née Dubois) and William Henry Spooner. His older brother Eric Spooner was also a member of parliament. Spooner was educated at Christ Church School. In June 1914, aged 16, he enlisted in the Australian Imperial Force. He served at Gallipoli and on the Western Front, and was awarded the Military Medal in September 1917. In 1918, Spooner joined the Australian Flying Corps and was commissioned a second lieutenant, completing his war service in August 1919. He established the accounting firm of Hungerford, Spooner & Co in 1922 with his brother Eric. He studied for a diploma of economics at the University of Sydney, graduating in 1923. He married Catherine Frier Vera Bogle in April 1924.

== Introduction to politics ==
Spooner helped campaign for his older brother Eric, who was elected to state parliament in 1932 as a member of the United Australia Party (UAP) and later served a single term in federal parliament. In the early 1940s, he became involved with the Liberal Democratic Party (LDP), a UAP splinter group. In January 1945, the LDP subsequently merged into the new Liberal Party of Australia, and Spooner was chosen as chairman of the provisional executive for the New South Wales division. In July 1945, he was elected as the inaugural state president of the party, a position he would hold until 1950. The following month, he was also made federal treasurer; he also served on the party's Federal Council and Federal Executive, and was chairman of the Federal Finance Committee from 1946 to 1949.

== Senate ==
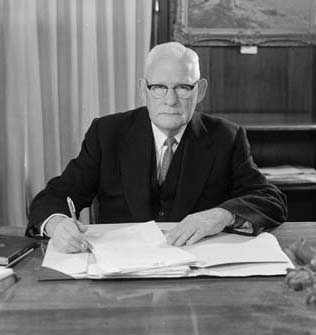
Spooner in 1962.

Spooner was elected to the Senate at the 1949 federal election. Although his Senate term began on 22 February 1950, he was sworn in as Minister for Social Services in the Menzies government on 19 December 1949. The Australian Constitution allows ministers to serve for up to three months without being a member of parliament. Spooner was the first person without parliamentary experience to be appointed to the federal ministry since the ministers in the Barton caretaker ministry prior to the first federal election in 1901. His colleague John Spicer was also sworn in prior to the start of his Senate term, but had previous experience in the Senate.

In May 1951, Spooner became Minister for National Development and held that position until his resignation from the ministry in June 1964. His portfolio was responsible for policy regarding the mining industry, especially coal, oil, uranium and iron ore. He also oversaw the Snowy Mountains Hydro-electric Authority, the Australian Atomic Energy Commission, the River Murray Commission, the Joint Coal Board, and some development projects in northern Australia. From 1958 until 1964, he was Vice-President of the Executive Council. In September 1962, Spooner was acting prime minister in the absence of other senior ministers, who were overseas attending the 1962 Commonwealth Prime Ministers' Conference (Menzies and John McEwen) and an International Monetary Fund meeting (Harold Holt). The Canberra Times reported that he was only the second senator to serve as acting prime minister, after George Pearce in 1916.

Spooner resigned from the Senate in July 1965.

He was made a Knight Commander of the Order of St Michael and St George in 1963 and a privy counsellor in 1966. He died of cancer in July 1966 at Manly Hospital, survived by his wife, a son and two daughters.

== Notes ==
Political offices
Preceded by Nick McKenna	Minister for Social Services; 1949–1951	Succeeded by Athol Townley
New title	Minister for National Development; 1951–1964	Succeeded by David Fairbairn
Preceded by Neil O'Sullivan	Vice-President of the Executive Council; 1958–1964	Succeeded by William McMahon
Party political offices
Preceded by Neil O'Sullivan	Leader of the Liberal Party in the Senate; 1956–1964	Succeeded by Shane Paltridge
