= Shane Paltridge =

Australian politician

The Honourable Sir Shane Paltridge KBE
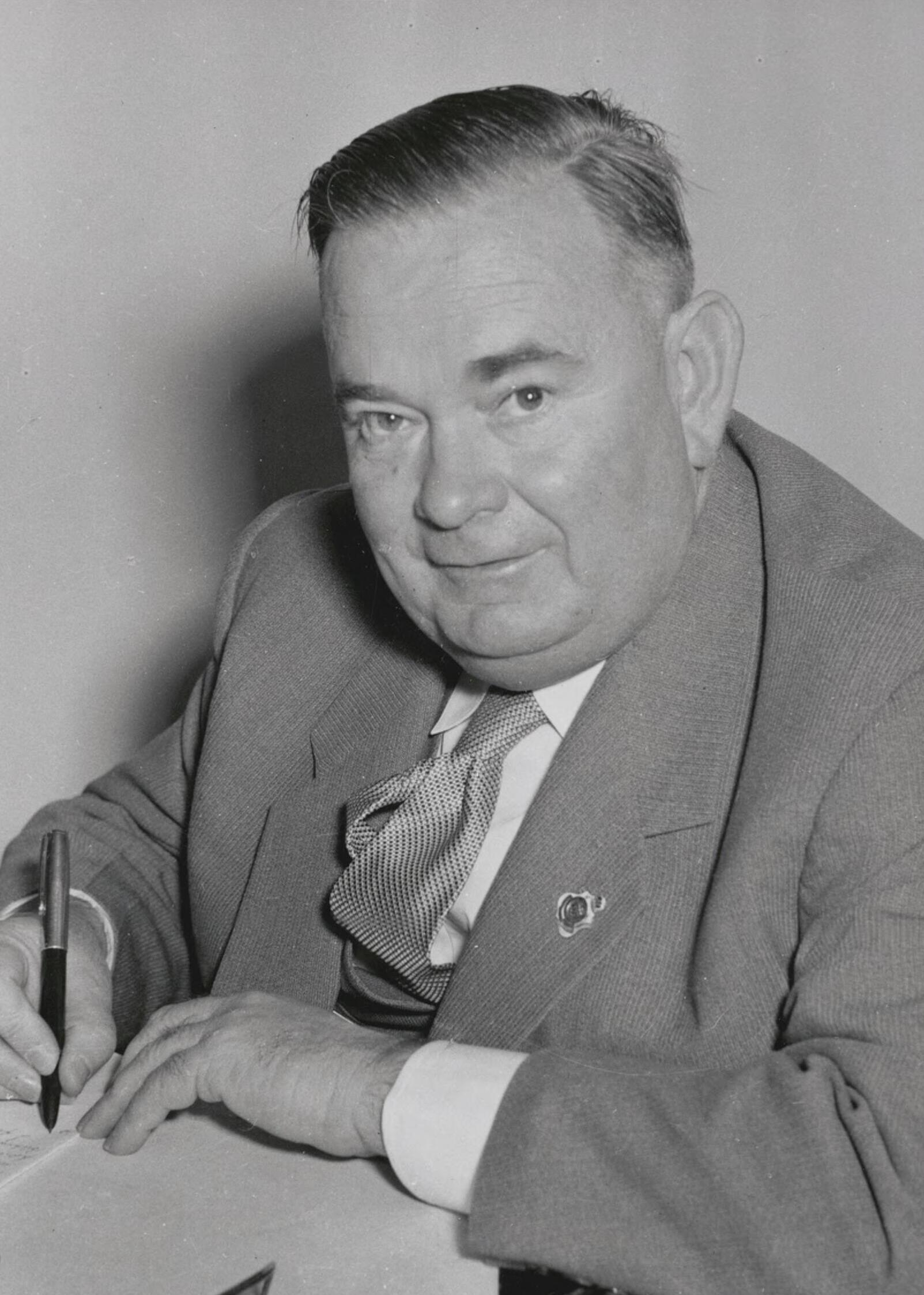

Leader of the Government in the Senate
- In office 10 June 1964 – 19 January 1966
- Prime Minister: Robert Menzies
- Preceded by: Bill Spooner
- Succeeded by: Denham Henty

Minister for Defence
- In office 24 April 1964 – 19 January 1966
- Prime Minister: Robert Menzies
- Preceded by: Paul Hasluck
- Succeeded by: Allen Fairhall

Minister for Civil Aviation
- In office 24 October 1956 – 24 April 1964
- Prime Minister: Robert Menzies
- Preceded by: Athol Townley
- Succeeded by: Denham Henty

Minister for Shipping and Transport
- In office 27 September 1955 – 5 February 1960
- Prime Minister: Robert Menzies
- Preceded by: John Spicer
- Succeeded by: Hubert Opperman

Senator for Western Australia
- In office 28 April 1951 – 21 January 1966
- Succeeded by: Reg Withers

Personal details
- Born: Shane Dunne Paltridge; 11 January 1910 Leederville, Western Australia
- Died: 21 January 1966 (aged 56) Nedlands, Western Australia
- Party: Liberal
- Spouse: Molly McEncroe (m. 1947)
- Relations: Hannah Beazley (granddaughter)
- Occupation: Bank clerk, hotel manager

Sir Shane Dunne Paltridge KBE (11 January 1910 – 21 January 1966) was an Australian politician. He was a member of the Liberal Party and served in the Menzies Government as Minister for Shipping and Transport (1955–1960), Civil Aviation (1956–1964), and Defence (1964–1966). He was a Senator for Western Australia from 1951 until his death in 1966. Prior to entering politics he worked as a bank clerk, hotel manager and soldier.

== Early life ==
Paltridge was born on 11 January 1910 in Leederville, Western Australia. He was the son of Florence Marjory (née Thomas) and Archer Dunn Paltridge. His father worked as a banker and the family lived for periods in Western Australia, Queensland, and New South Wales. He attended primary school in Moora, Western Australia, Ipswich, Queensland, and Enmore, New South Wales, before completing his education to the age of 16 with an Intermediate Certificate from Fort Street Boys' High School in Sydney.

In 1927 Paltridge began working for the National Bank of Australasia (NBA) in Sydney. His parents separated the following year and he returned to Perth with his mother and sister, living at the Broken Hill Hotel in Victoria Park that was managed by his uncle by marriage. Paltridge continued to work for the NBA until 1936, when he took over as manager and licensee of the hotel, a "large and busy working man's pub". His aunt had inherited the lease in 1931 following her husband's death.

Paltridge enlisted in the Royal Australian Air Force in February 1940, but failed flying training. He was subsequently assigned as a stores clerk, but was discharged in December 1941 and joined the Australian Imperial Force in February 1942. He saw overseas service as a gunner in the 2/7th Field Regiment, sailing to Morotai in April 1945 and serving in the Battle of Tarakan the following month. Paltridge returned to Australia in September 1945 following his mother's death. He subsequently resumed his management of the hotel.

== Politics ==
=== Early involvement ===
In 1946, Paltridge became a founding member of the Victoria Park branch of the Liberal Party. He was elected to the party's state executive in 1947. He "contributed substantially to local causes and to party funds" and in 1949 was involved in the rebranding of the party as the Liberal and Country League of Western Australia, an attempt to absorb the Country Party. He was the campaign manager for Bill Grayden in the seat of Swan at the 1949 federal election.

=== Senate ===
Paltridge was elected to a three-year Senate term at the 1951 federal election which followed a double dissolution, narrowly winning Western Australia's tenth seat as the final senator declared elected. He was re-elected at the 1953 election, filling the casual vacancy caused by the death of Senator Edmund Piesse, and then elected to full six-year terms at the 1955 and 1961 elections.

Paltridge became Minister for Shipping and Transport (1955–60) and Minister for Civil Aviation (1956–64) under Prime Minister Robert Menzies. In April 1964, he became Minister for Defence, during the early period of Australia's participation in the Vietnam War. Although he recommended against the immediate introduction of conscription in 1964, Cabinet decided to introduce it anyway.

=== Illness and death ===
Paltridge became gravely ill with cancer in late 1965. He was made a Knight Commander of the Order of the British Empire on 1 January 1966, and died at Sir Charles Gairdner Hospital on 21 January 1966 having resigned as Minister for Defence two days earlier.

== Personal life ==
Paltridge married Molly McEncroe on 21 January 1947, with whom he had two daughters. Mary, one of his daughters, was the first wife of the Labor politician Kim Beazley.

Political offices
Preceded by John Spicer	Minister for Shipping and Transport; 1955–1960	Succeeded by John Spicer
Preceded by Athol Townley	Minister for Civil Aviation; 1956–1964	Succeeded by Denham Henty
Preceded by Paul Hasluck	Minister for Defence; 1964–1966	Succeeded by Allen Fairhall
Party political offices
Preceded by Bill Spooner	Leader of the Liberal Party in the Senate; 1964–1966	Succeeded by Denham Henty
