= Allen Fairhall =

Australian politician

The Honourable Sir Allen Fairhall KBE
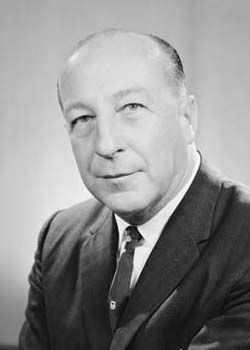

Minister for Defence
- In office 26 January 1966 – 12 November 1969
- Prime Minister: Harold Holt; John McEwen; John Gorton
- Preceded by: Shane Paltridge
- Succeeded by: Malcolm Fraser

Minister for Supply
- In office 22 December 1961 – 26 January 1966
- Prime Minister: Robert Menzies
- Preceded by: Alan Hulme
- Succeeded by: Denham Henty

Minister for the Interior Minister for Works
- In office 11 January 1956 – 10 December 1958
- Prime Minister: Robert Menzies
- Preceded by: Wilfrid Kent Hughes
- Succeeded by: Gordon Freeth

Member of the Australian Parliament for Paterson
- In office 10 December 1949 – 29 September 1969
- Preceded by: New seat
- Succeeded by: Frank O'Keefe

Personal details
- Born: 24 November 1909 Morpeth, New South Wales, Australia
- Died: 3 November 2006 (aged 96) Newcastle, New South Wales, Australia
- Party: Liberal
- Spouse: Monica Ballantyne (m. 1936)
- Occupation: Electrical fitter, radio officer

Sir Allen Fairhall KBE FRSA (24 November 1909 – 3 November 2006) was an Australian politician who served in the House of Representatives from 1949 to 1969, representing the Liberal Party. He was a government minister under four prime ministers, most notably as Minister for Defence from 1966 to 1969.

== Early life ==
Fairhall was born at Morpeth, New South Wales, and attended East Maitland Boys' High School. After school he was apprenticed as an electrical fitter at the Walsh Island Dockyard in Newcastle, while attending Newcastle Technical College. At the same time he developed an interest in radio and gained an amateur radio licence in 1928 (callsign VK2KB), which he held for more than 50 years . He was able to convince the then Postmaster-General's Department that Newcastle needed a second commercial radio station. In 1931 he established 2KO. During World War II he worked on the supply of signals equipment for the Australian armed services. From 1941 to 1944 he was an alderman of the City of Newcastle.

== Political career ==
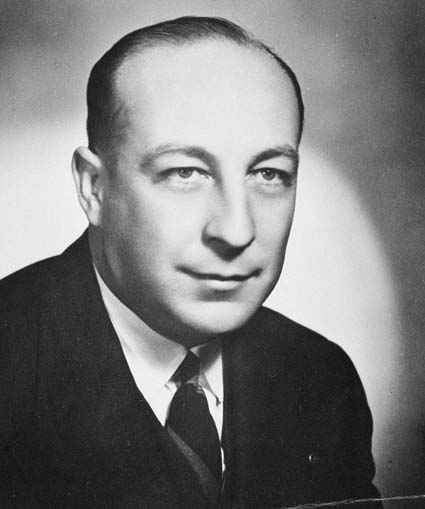
Fairhall in the 1950s.

In 1949, Fairhall entered the Federal Parliament as the Liberal Member for Paterson. He was Minister for Interior and Minister for Works (1956–58), Minister for Supply (1961–66) and Minister for Defence (1966–69). In the latter role, he was responsible for the introduction of the F-111 fighter aircraft and the reintroduction of conscription for the Vietnam War. The purchase of the F-111 was a major political issue in the late 1960s and early 1970s due to price escalation and late delivery. The Royal Australian Air Force retired its last F-111Cs in December 2010.

Following the disappearance of Harold Holt in December 1967, Fairhall had support to nominate for the leadership of the Liberal Party (effectively for the Prime Ministership), but he declined to do so.

== Later life ==
Fairhall retired before the 1969 election. After retirement he wrote a book on Henry George, Towards a New Society. He was made a Knight Commander of the Order of the British Empire (KBE) in 1970, received an honorary Doctorate of Science by Newcastle University, and was awarded the James N Kirby Medal from the Institution of Production Engineers (Australian Division) and life membership of the Wireless Institute of Australia.

He died in November 2006, aged 96.

== Notes ==
Political offices
Preceded by Wilfrid Kent Hughes	Minister for Interior; Minister for Works; 1956–1958	Succeeded by Gordon Freeth
Preceded by Alan Hulme	Minister for Supply; 1961–1966	Succeeded by Denham Henty
Preceded by Shane Paltridge	Minister for Defence; 1966–1969	Succeeded by Malcolm Fraser
Parliament of Australia
New division	Member for Paterson; 1949–1969	Succeeded by Frank O'Keefe
