= Denham Henty =

Australian politician

The Honourable Sir Denham Henty KBE
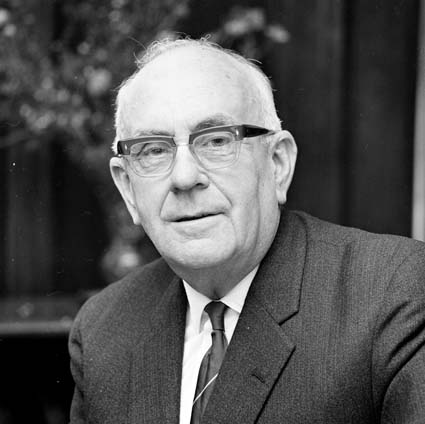

Leader of the Government in the Senate
- In office 26 January 1966 – 16 October 1967
- Leader: Harold Holt
- Preceded by: Shane Paltridge
- Succeeded by: John Gorton

Minister for Supply
- In office 26 January 1966 – 28 February 1968
- Prime Minister: Harold Holt; John McEwen; John Gorton
- Preceded by: Allen Fairhall
- Succeeded by: Ken Anderson

Minister for Civil Aviation
- In office 10 June 1964 – 26 January 1966
- Prime Minister: Robert Menzies
- Preceded by: Shane Paltridge
- Succeeded by: Reg Swartz

Minister for Customs and Excise
- In office 24 October 1956 – 10 June 1964
- Prime Minister: Robert Menzies
- Preceded by: Frederick Osborne
- Succeeded by: Ken Anderson

Senator for Tasmania
- In office 1 July 1950 – 30 June 1968

Personal details
- Born: 13 October 1903 Longford, Tasmania, Australia
- Died: 9 May 1978 (aged 74)
- Party: Liberal
- Spouse: Faith Spotswood (m. 1930)
- Relations: Jim Henty (brother)

Sir Norman Henry Denham Henty, KBE (13 October 1903 – 9 May 1978) was an Australian politician. He was a member of the Liberal Party and served as a Senator for Tasmania from 1950 to 1968. He held ministerial office as Minister for Customs and Excise (1956–1964), Civil Aviation (1964–1966), and Supply (1966–1968). He also served as mayor of Launceston from 1948 to 1949.

== Early life ==
Henty was born in Longford, Tasmania, the second child of Thomas Norman Henty and Sarah Nina Lily Mary, née Wilson. His grandfather was Thomas Henty, part of the pioneering Henty family. He was educated at Launceston Church Grammar School. He left school at fourteen to work in his father's wholesale business. In March 1930 he married Faith Gordon Spotswood and they subsequently had three sons and a daughter. He served as an alderman on Launceston City Council from 1943 to 1951 and was mayor from 1948 to 1949.

== Politics ==
Henty was elected to the Senate of Australia at the 1949 election, representing the Liberal Party and served until his retirement in June 1968. He served as Minister for Customs and Excise from October 1956 to June 1964. In 1960 he prohibited the export of Australian native fauna for commercial purposes. From June 1964 to January 1966, he was Minister for Civil Aviation and he was then Minister for Supply until February 1968.

== Honours ==
He was knighted in 1968 for parliamentary service. The Denham Henty Waterscape in Launceston's Civic Square is named in his honour.

== Notes ==
Political offices
Preceded by Frederick Osborne	Minister for Customs and Excise; 1956–1964	Succeeded by Ken Anderson
Preceded by Shane Paltridge	Minister for Civil Aviation; 1964–1966	Succeeded by Reginald Swartz
Preceded by Allen Fairhall	Minister for Supply; 1966–1968	Succeeded by Ken Anderson
Party political offices
Preceded by Shane Paltridge	Leader of the Liberal Party in the Senate; 1966–1967	Succeeded by John Gorton
