= Minister for Infrastructure, Transport, Regional Development and Local Government =

Australian cabinet position

- Commonwealth Coat of Arms

- Flag of Australia

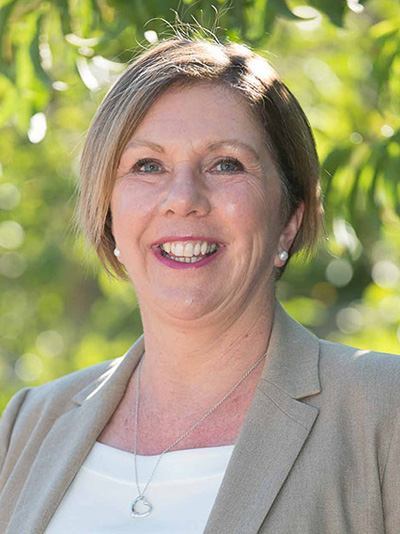
- Incumbent; Catherine King since 1 June 2022
- Department of Infrastructure, Transport, Regional Development, Communications, Sport and the Arts
- Style: The Honourable
- Appointer: Governor-General on the advice of the prime minister
- Inaugural holder: Thomas Paterson (as Minister for Markets and Transport)
- Formation: 10 December 1928
- Website: minister.infrastructure.gov.au/c-king

The minister for infrastructure, transport, regional development and local government in the Government of Australia is a position currently held by Catherine King following the swearing in of the full Albanese ministry on 1 June 2022.

The minister for regional development, local government and territories is a position currently held by Kristy McBain.

== Scope ==
In the Government of Australia, the minister for infrastructure has overall responsibility for all of the matters falling within the Infrastructure, Transport, Regional Development and Communications portfolio, including regulation, safety and funding in relation to aviation, shipping, roads and railways and policy on regional development and local government.

== History ==
Under the Constitution of Australia the federal government was not given any specific responsibilities for transport, except for "railway construction and extension in any State with the consent of that State" (section 51(xxxiv)). In 1916, Billy Hughes appointed Patrick Lynch as Minister for Works and Railways to administer Commonwealth Railways and the construction of the Trans-Australian Railway. In December 1928, Stanley Bruce appointed Thomas Paterson as Minister for Markets and Transport, which included responsibility for funding road construction via grants to the states. In January 1932, this portfolio was renamed Minister for Transport, but in April 1932 it was absorbed into the new portfolio of Minister for the Interior along with the position of Minister for Works and Railways.

In December 1938, with the growth of significance of civil aviation and the commonwealth's assumption of responsibility for regulating it under international treaties, Joseph Lyons appointed Harold Thorby as the first Minister for Civil Aviation. In 1941 Robert Menzies re-established the transport portfolio with the appointment of Hubert Lawrence Anthony. The Curtin government was determined to establish a government shipping company, ultimately the Australian National Lines, and John Curtin appointed Jack Beasley as Minister for Supply and Development in 1941. This position was renamed Minister for Shipping, Fuel and Transport in 1950 under the Menzies government and Minister for Shipping and Transport in 1951. Gough Whitlam combined the transport and civil aviation portfolios in 1973, but it was re-divided with Malcolm Fraser's appointment of Wal Fife as Minister for Aviation in 1982. Bob Hawke abolished the aviation portfolio in 1987 with the creation of the "super" departments. Since 1987, there has been a single senior transport minister in Cabinet.

== Agency and bodies ==
Other agencies and bodies the portfolio include:

- Australian Transport Safety Bureau
- Airservices Australia
- Australian Bicycle Council
- Australian Global Navigation Satellite System Coordination Committee (AGCC)
- Australian Local Government and Planning Ministers' Council
- Australian Maritime College
- Australian Maritime Safety Authority
- Australian Motor Vehicle Certification Board
- Australian Rail Operations Unit
- Australian Rail Track Corporation
- Australian Transport Advisory Council
- Christmas Island Administration
- Civil Aviation Safety Authority
- Cocos (Keeling) Islands Administration
- East Kimberley Council of Australian Governments (COAG) Indigenous Trial
- International Air Services Commission
- Jervis Bay Territory Administration
- Local Government and Planning Joint Committee
- National Capital Authority
- National Transport Commission
- Navigation Safety Advisory Committee
- Administrator of the Northern Territory
- Office of the Administrator Norfolk Island
- Regional Development Council
- Regional Women's Advisory Council
- Standing Committee on Regional Development Secretariat
- Stevedoring Industry Finance Committee
- Tasmanian Freight Equalisation Scheme Review Authority

== List of ministers for infrastructure and transport ==
The following individuals have been appointed as Minister for Infrastructure, Transport and Regional Development, or any precedent titles:

Order	Minister	Party	Prime Minister	Title	Term start	Term end	Term in office
1	Thomas Paterson	Country	Bruce	Minister for Markets and Transport	10 December 1928	22 October 1929	316 days
2	Parker Moloney	Labor	Scullin	Minister for Markets and Transport	22 October 1929	21 April 1930	2 years, 76 days
2	Parker Moloney	Labor	Scullin	Minister for Transport	21 April 1930	6 January 1932	2 years, 76 days
3	Archdale Parkhill	United Australia	Lyons	Minister for Transport	6 January 1932	12 April 1932	97 days
4	Larry Anthony	Country	Menzies	Minister for Transport	26 June 1941	28 August 1941	316 days
4	Larry Anthony	Country	Fadden	Minister for Transport	28 August 1941	7 October 1941	316 days
5	George Lawson	Labor	Curtin	Minister for Transport	7 October 1941	21 September 1943	1 year, 349 days
6	Eddie Ward	Labor	Curtin	Minister for Transport	21 September 1943	6 July 1945	6 years, 89 days
6	Eddie Ward	Labor	Forde	Minister for Transport	6 July 1945	13 July 1945	6 years, 89 days
6	Eddie Ward	Labor	Chifley	Minister for Transport	13 July 1945	19 December 1949	6 years, 89 days
7	Howard Beale	Liberal	Menzies	Minister for Transport	19 December 1949	17 March 1950	88 days
8	George McLeay	Liberal	Menzies	Minister for Shipping, Fuel and Transport	17 March 1950	11 May 1951	5 years, 181 days
8	George McLeay	Liberal	Menzies	Minister for Shipping and Transport	11 May 1951	14 September 1955	5 years, 181 days
9	John Spicer	Liberal	Menzies	Minister for Shipping and Transport	14 September 1955	27 September 1955	13 days
10	Shane Paltridge	Liberal	Menzies	Minister for Shipping and Transport	27 September 1955	5 February 1960	4 years, 131 days
11	Hubert Opperman	Liberal	Menzies	Minister for Shipping and Transport	5 February 1960	18 December 1963	3 years, 316 days
12	Gordon Freeth	Liberal	Menzies	Minister for Shipping and Transport	18 December 1963	21 January 1966	4 years, 72 days
12	Gordon Freeth	Liberal	Holt	Minister for Shipping and Transport	26 January 1966	19 December 1967	4 years, 72 days
12	Gordon Freeth	Liberal	McEwen	Minister for Shipping and Transport	19 December 1967	10 January 1968	4 years, 72 days
12	Gordon Freeth	Liberal	Gorton	Minister for Shipping and Transport	10 January 1968	28 February 1968	4 years, 72 days
13	Ian Sinclair	Country	Gorton	Minister for Shipping and Transport	28 February 1968	5 February 1971	2 years, 342 days
14	Peter Nixon	Country	Gorton	Minister for Shipping and Transport	5 February 1971	10 March 1971	1 year, 304 days
14	Peter Nixon	Country	McMahon	Minister for Shipping and Transport	10 March 1971	5 December 1972	1 year, 304 days
15	Gough Whitlam	Labor	Whitlam	Minister for Shipping and Transport	5 December 1972	19 December 1972	14 days
16	Charles Jones	Labor	Whitlam	Minister for Transport	19 December 1972	11 November 1975	2 years, 327 days
(14)	Peter Nixon	National Country	Fraser	Minister for Transport	11 November 1975	8 December 1979	4 years, 27 days
17	Ralph Hunt	National Country	Fraser	Minister for Transport	8 December 1979	7 May 1982	3 years, 93 days
17	Ralph Hunt	National Country	Fraser	Minister for Transport and Construction	7 May 1982	16 October 1982	3 years, 93 days
17	Ralph Hunt	National	Fraser	Minister for Transport and Construction	16 October 1982	11 March 1983	3 years, 93 days
18	Peter Morris	Labor	Hawke	Minister for Transport	11 March 1983	24 July 1987	4 years, 135 days
19	Gareth Evans	Labor	Hawke	Minister for Transport and Communications	24 July 1987	2 September 1988	1 year, 40 days
20	Ralph Willis	Labor	Hawke	Minister for Transport and Communications	2 September 1988	4 April 1990	1 year, 214 days
21	Kim Beazley	Labor	Hawke	Minister for Transport and Communications	4 April 1990	9 December 1991	1 year, 249 days
22	John Kerin	Labor	Hawke	Minister for Transport and Communications	9 December 1991	20 December 1991	18 days
22	John Kerin	Labor	Keating	Minister for Transport and Communications	20 December 1991	27 December 1991	18 days
23	Graham Richardson	Labor	Keating	Minister for Transport and Communications	27 December 1991	18 May 1992	143 days
24	Bob Collins	Labor	Keating	Minister for Transport and Communications	18 May 1992	24 December 1993	1 year, 220 days
25	Laurie Brereton	Labor	Keating	Minister for Transport	24 December 1993	11 March 1996	2 years, 78 days
26	John Sharp	Nationals	Howard	Minister for Transport and Regional Development	11 March 1996	25 September 1997	1 year, 198 days
27	Mark Vaile	Nationals	Howard	Minister for Transport and Regional Development	25 September 1997	21 October 1998	1 year, 26 days
28	John Anderson	Nationals	Howard	Minister for Transport and Regional Services	21 October 1998	6 July 2005	6 years, 258 days
29	Warren Truss	Nationals	Howard	Minister for Transport and Regional Services	6 July 2005	29 September 2006	1 year, 85 days
(27)	Mark Vaile	Nationals	Howard	Minister for Transport and Regional Services	29 September 2006	3 December 2007	1 year, 65 days
30	Anthony Albanese	Labor	Rudd	Minister for Infrastructure, Transport, Regional Development and Local Government	3 December 2007	24 June 2010	5 years, 289 days
30	Anthony Albanese	Labor	Gillard	Minister for Infrastructure, Transport, Regional Development and Local Government	24 June 2010	28 June 2010	5 years, 289 days
30	Anthony Albanese	Labor	Gillard	Minister for Infrastructure and Transport	14 September 2010	27 June 2013	5 years, 289 days
30	Anthony Albanese	Labor	Rudd	Minister for Infrastructure and Transport	27 June 2013	18 September 2013	5 years, 289 days
(29)	Warren Truss	Nationals	Abbott	Minister for Infrastructure and Regional Development	18 September 2013	15 September 2015	2 years, 153 days
(29)	Warren Truss	Nationals	Turnbull	Minister for Infrastructure and Regional Development	15 September 2015	18 February 2016	2 years, 153 days
31	Darren Chester	Nationals	Turnbull	Minister for Infrastructure and Transport	18 February 2016	20 December 2017	1 year, 305 days
32	Barnaby Joyce	Nationals	Turnbull	Minister for Infrastructure and Transport	20 December 2017	26 February 2018	68 days
33	Michael McCormack	Nationals	Turnbull	Minister for Infrastructure and Transport	26 February 2018	28 August 2018	3 years, 116 days
33	Michael McCormack	Nationals	Morrison	Minister for Infrastructure, Transport and Regional Development	28 August 2018	22 June 2021	3 years, 116 days
(32)	Barnaby Joyce	Nationals	Morrison	Minister for Infrastructure, Transport and Regional Development	22 June 2021	23 May 2022	335 days
34	Catherine King	Labor	Albanese	Minister for Infrastructure, Transport, Regional Development and Local Government	1 June 2022	Incumbent	4 years, 98 days

== List of ministers for regional development ==
The following individuals have been appointed Minister for Regional Development, or any precedent titles:

Order	Minister	Party	Prime Minister	Title	Term start	Term end	Term in office
1	Tom Uren	Labor	Whitlam	Minister for Urban and Regional Development	19 December 1972	11 November 1975	2 years, 327 days
2	John Carrick	Liberal	Fraser	Minister for Urban and Regional Development	11 November 1975	22 December 1975	41 days
3	Ivor Greenwood	Liberal	Fraser	Minister for Environment, Housing and Community Development	22 December 1975	8 July 1976	199 days
4	Kevin Newman	Liberal	Fraser	Minister for Environment, Housing and Community Development	8 July 1976	20 December 1977	1 year, 165 days
5	Ray Groom	Liberal	Fraser	Minister for Environment, Housing and Community Development	20 December 1977	5 December 1978	350 days
6	Alan Griffiths	Labor	Keating	Minister for Industry, Technology and Regional Development	24 March 1993	23 January 1994	305 days
7	Peter Cook	Labor	Keating	Minister for Industry, Technology and Regional Development	30 January 1994	25 March 1994	54 days
8	Brian Howe	Labor	Keating	Minister for Housing and Regional Development	25 March 1994	11 March 1996	1 year, 352 days
9	John Sharp	Nationals	Howard	Minister for Transport and Regional Development	11 March 1996	25 September 1997	1 year, 198 days
10	Mark Vaile	Nationals	Howard	Minister for Transport and Regional Development	25 September 1997	21 October 1998	1 year, 26 days
11	John Anderson	Nationals	Howard	Minister for Transport and Regional Services	21 October 1998	6 July 2005	6 years, 258 days
12	Warren Truss	Nationals	Howard	Minister for Transport and Regional Services	6 July 2005	29 September 2006	1 year, 85 days
(10)	Mark Vaile	Nationals	Howard	Minister for Transport and Regional Services	29 September 2006	3 December 2007	1 year, 65 days
13	Anthony Albanese	Labor	Rudd	Minister for Infrastructure, Transport, Regional Development and Local Government	3 December 2007	24 June 2010	2 years, 207 days
13	Anthony Albanese	Labor	Gillard	Minister for Infrastructure, Transport, Regional Development and Local Government	24 June 2010	28 June 2010	2 years, 207 days
14	Simon Crean	Labor	Gillard	Minister for Regional Australia, Regional Development and Local Government	28 June 2010	25 March 2013	2 years, 270 days
(13)	Anthony Albanese	Labor	Gillard	Minister for Regional Development and Local Government	25 March 2013	1 July 2013	98 days
15	Sharon Bird	Labor	Rudd	Minister for Regional Development	1 July 2013	18 September 2013	79 days
(12)	Warren Truss	Nationals	Abbott	Minister for Infrastructure and Regional Development	18 September 2013	15 September 2015	2 years, 153 days
(12)	Warren Truss	Nationals	Turnbull	Minister for Infrastructure and Regional Development	15 September 2015	18 February 2016	2 years, 153 days
16	Fiona Nash	Nationals	Turnbull	Minister for Regional Development	18 February 2016	27 October 2017	1 year, 251 days
17	Darren Chester	Nationals	Turnbull	Minister for Regional Development	27 October 2017	20 December 2017	54 days
18	John McVeigh	Nationals	Turnbull	Minister for Regional Development, Territories and Local Government	20 December 2017	24 August 2018	251 days
18	John McVeigh	Nationals	Morrison	Minister for Regional Development, Territories and Local Government	24 August 2018	28 August 2018	251 days
19	Michael McCormack	Nationals	Morrison	Minister for Infrastructure, Transport and Regional Development	28 August 2018	22 June 2021	2 years, 298 days
20	Barnaby Joyce	Nationals	Morrison	Minister for Infrastructure, Transport and Regional Development	22 June 2021	23 May 2022	335 days
21	Catherine King	Labor	Albanese	Minister for Infrastructure, Transport, Regional Development and Local Government	1 June 2022	Incumbent	4 years, 98 days
21	Kristy McBain	Labor	Albanese	Minister for Regional Development, Local Government and Territories	1 June 2022	Incumbent	4 years, 98 days

== List of ministers for local government ==
The following individuals have been appointed Minister for Local Government, or any precedent titles:

Order	Minister	Party	Prime Minister	Title	Term start	Term end	Term in office
1	Tom Uren	Labor	Hawke	Minister for Territories and Local Government, Minister assisting the Prime Minister for Community Development and Regional Affairs	11 March 1983	13 December 1984	4 years, 135 days
1	Tom Uren	Labor	Hawke	Minister for Local Government and Administrative Services	13 December 1984	24 July 1987	4 years, 135 days
2	Margaret Reynolds	Labor	Hawke	Minister for Local Government	18 September 1987	4 April 1990	2 years, 198 days
3	Wendy Fatin	Labor	Hawke	Minister for Local Government	4 April 1990	20 December 1991	1 year, 267 days
3	Wendy Fatin	Labor	Keating	Minister for Local Government	20 December 1991	27 December 1991	1 year, 267 days
4	David Simmons	Labor	Keating	Minister for Local Government	27 December 1991	24 March 1993	1 year, 87 days
5	Brian Howe	Labor	Keating	Minister for Housing, Local Government and Community Services	24 March 1993	23 December 1993	1 year, 1 day
5	Brian Howe	Labor	Keating	Minister for Housing, Local Government and Human Services	23 December 1993	25 March 1994	1 year, 1 day
6	Warwick Smith	Liberal	Howard	Minister for Sport, Territories and Local Government	11 March 1996	9 October 1997	1 year, 212 days
7	Alex Somlyay	Liberal	Howard	Minister for Regional Development, Territories and Local Government	9 October 1997	21 October 1998	1 year, 12 days
8	Ian Macdonald	Liberal	Howard	Minister for Regional Services, Territories and Local Government	21 October 1998	26 November 2001	3 years, 36 days
9	Wilson Tuckey	Liberal	Howard	Minister for Regional Services, Territories and Local Government	25 January 2002	7 October 2003	1 year, 255 days
10	Ian Campbell	Liberal	Howard	Minister for Local Government, Territories and Roads	7 October 2003	18 July 2004	285 days
11	Jim Lloyd	Liberal	Howard	Minister for Local Government, Territories and Roads	18 July 2004	3 December 2007	3 years, 138 days
12	Anthony Albanese	Labor	Rudd	Minister for Infrastructure, Transport, Regional Development and Local Government	3 December 2007	24 June 2010	2 years, 207 days
12	Anthony Albanese	Labor	Gillard	Minister for Infrastructure, Transport, Regional Development and Local Government	24 June 2010	28 June 2010	2 years, 207 days
13	Simon Crean	Labor	Gillard	Minister for Regional Australia, Regional Development and Local Government	28 June 2010	25 March 2013	2 years, 270 days
(12)	Anthony Albanese	Labor	Gillard	Minister for Regional Development and Local Government	25 March 2013	1 July 2013	98 days
14	Catherine King	Labor	Rudd	Minister for Regional Australia, Local Government and Territories	1 July 2013	18 September 2013	79 days
15	Paul Fletcher	Liberal	Turnbull	Minister for Territories, Local Government and Major Projects	21 September 2015	19 July 2016	302 days
16	Fiona Nash	National	Turnbull	Minister for Local Government and Territories	19 July 2016	27 October 2017	1 year, 100 days
17	Darren Chester	National	Turnbull	Minister for Local Government and Territories	27 October 2017	20 December 2017	54 days
18	John McVeigh	National	Turnbull	Minister for Regional Development, Territories and Local Government	20 December 2017	24 August 2018	251 days
18	John McVeigh	National	Morrison	Minister for Regional Development, Territories and Local Government	24 August 2018	28 August 2018	251 days
19	Bridget McKenzie	National	Morrison	Minister for Regional Services, Sport, Local Government and Decentralisation	28 August 2018	29 May 2019	274 days
20	Mark Coulton	National	Morrison	Minister for Regional Services, Decentralisation and Local Government	29 May 2019	6 February 2020	2 years, 34 days
20	Mark Coulton	National	Morrison	Minister for Regional Health, Regional Communications and Local Government	6 February 2020	2 July 2021	2 years, 34 days
(19)	Bridget McKenzie	National	Morrison	Minister for Regionalisation, Regional Communications and Regional Education	2 July 2021	23 May 2022	325 days
(14)	Catherine King	Labor	Albanese	Minister for Infrastructure, Transport, Regional Development and Local Government	1 June 2022	Incumbent	4 years, 98 days
21	Kristy McBain	Labor	Albanese	Minister for Regional Development, Local Government and Territories	1 June 2022	Incumbent	4 years, 98 days

== List of ministers for cities ==
The following individuals have served as the minister for cities, or any other precedent titles:

Order	Minister	Party	Prime Minister	Title	Term start	Term end	Term in office
1	Tom Uren	Labor	Whitlam	Minister for Urban and Regional Development	19 December 1972	11 November 1975	2 years, 327 days
2	John Carrick	Liberal	Fraser	Minister for Urban and Regional Development	11 November 1975	22 December 1975	41 days
3	Ivor Greenwood	Liberal	Fraser	Minister for Environment, Housing and Community Development	22 December 1975	8 July 1976	199 days
4	Kevin Newman	Liberal	Fraser	Minister for Environment, Housing and Community Development	8 July 1976	20 December 1977	1 year, 165 days
5	Ray Groom	Liberal	Fraser	Minister for Environment, Housing and Community Development	20 December 1977	5 December 1978	350 days
6	Tony Burke	Labor	Rudd	Minister for Population	14 April 2010	28 June 2010	3 years, 78 days
6	Tony Burke	Labor	Gillard	Minister for Sustainable Population	28 June 2010	14 September 2010	3 years, 78 days
6	Tony Burke	Labor	Gillard	Minister for Sustainability, Environment, Water, Population and Communities	14 September 2010	1 July 2013	3 years, 78 days
7	Jamie Briggs	Liberal	Abbott	Assistant Minister for Infrastructure and Regional Development	18 September 2013	15 September 2015	2 years, 102 days
7	Jamie Briggs	Liberal	Turnbull	Assistant Minister for Infrastructure and Regional Development	15 September 2015	21 September 2015	2 years, 102 days
7	Jamie Briggs	Liberal	Turnbull	Minister for Cities and the Built Environment	21 September 2015	29 December 2015	2 years, 102 days
8	Paul Fletcher	Liberal	Turnbull	Minister for Urban Infrastructure	19 July 2016	20 December 2017	2 years, 39 days
8	Paul Fletcher	Liberal	Turnbull	Minister for Urban Infrastructure and Cities	20 December 2017	28 August 2018	2 years, 39 days
9	Alan Tudge	Liberal	Morrison	Minister for Cities, Urban Infrastructure and Population	28 August 2018	29 May 2019	2 years, 116 days
9	Alan Tudge	Liberal	Morrison	Minister for Population, Cities and Urban Infrastructure	29 May 2019	22 December 2020	2 years, 116 days
(8)	Paul Fletcher	Liberal	Morrison	Minister for Communications, Urban Infrastructure, Cities and the Arts	22 December 2020	23 May 2022	1 year, 152 days
10	Jenny McAllister	Labor	Albanese	Minister for Cities	29 July 2024	13 May 2025	288 days
11	Clare O'Neil	Labor	Albanese	Minister for Cities	13 May 2025	Incumbent	1 year, 117 days

== Former ministerial titles and portfolios ==
=== List of ministers for aviation ===
The following individuals have been appointed as Minister for Aviation, or any precedent titles:

Order	Minister	Party	Prime Minister	Title	Term start	Term end	Term in office
1	Harold Thorby	Country	Lyons	Minister for Civil Aviation	24 November 1938	7 April 1939	153 days
1	Harold Thorby	Country	Page	Minister for Civil Aviation	7 April 1939	26 April 1939	153 days
2	James Fairbairn	United Australia	Menzies	Minister for Civil Aviation	26 April 1939	13 August 1940	1 year, 109 days
3	Arthur Fadden	Country	Menzies	Minister for Civil Aviation	14 August 1940	28 October 1940	75 days
4	John McEwen	Country	Menzies	Minister for Civil Aviation	28 October 1940	28 August 1941	344 days
4	John McEwen	Country	Fadden	Minister for Civil Aviation	28 August 1941	7 October 1941	344 days
5	Arthur Drakeford	Labor	Curtin	Minister for Civil Aviation	7 October 1941	6 July 1945	8 years, 73 days
5	Arthur Drakeford	Labor	Forde	Minister for Civil Aviation	6 July 1945	13 July 1945	8 years, 73 days
5	Arthur Drakeford	Labor	Chifley	Minister for Civil Aviation	13 July 1945	19 December 1949	8 years, 73 days
6	Thomas White	Liberal	Menzies	Minister for Civil Aviation	19 December 1949	11 May 1951	1 year, 143 days
7	Larry Anthony	Country	Menzies	Minister for Civil Aviation	11 May 1951	9 July 1954	3 years, 61 days
8	Athol Townley	Liberal	Menzies	Minister for Civil Aviation	9 July 1954	24 October 1956	2 years, 107 days
9	Shane Paltridge	Liberal	Menzies	Minister for Civil Aviation	24 October 1956	10 June 1964	7 years, 230 days
10	Denham Henty	Liberal	Menzies	Minister for Civil Aviation	10 June 1964	26 January 1966	1 year, 230 days
11	Reginald Swartz	Liberal	Holt	Minister for Civil Aviation	26 January 1966	19 December 1967	3 years, 290 days
11	Reginald Swartz	Liberal	McEwen	Minister for Civil Aviation	19 December 1967	10 January 1968	3 years, 290 days
11	Reginald Swartz	Liberal	Gorton	Minister for Civil Aviation	10 January 1968	12 November 1969	3 years, 290 days
12	Bob Cotton	Liberal	Gorton	Minister for Civil Aviation	12 November 1969	10 March 1971	3 years, 23 days
12	Bob Cotton	Liberal	McMahon	Minister for Civil Aviation	10 March 1971	5 December 1972	3 years, 23 days
13	Gough Whitlam	Labor	Whitlam	Minister for Civil Aviation	5 December 1972	19 December 1972	14 days
14	Charles Jones	Labor	Whitlam	Minister for Civil Aviation	19 December 1972	30 November 1973	3 years, 23 days
15	Wal Fife	Liberal	Fraser	Minister for Aviation	7 May 1982	11 March 1983	280 days
16	Kim Beazley	Labor	Hawke	Minister for Aviation	11 March 1983	13 December 1984	1 year, 277 days
17	Peter Morris	Labor	Hawke	Minister for Aviation	13 December 1984	24 July 1987	2 years, 223 days
18	Gary Punch	Labor	Hawke	Minister for Telecommunications and Aviation Support	2 September 1988	28 March 1989	207 days
19	Ros Kelly	Labor	Hawke	Minister for Telecommunications and Aviation Support	6 April 1989	4 April 1990	363 days
20	Bob Collins	Labor	Hawke	Minister for Shipping and Aviation Support	7 May 1990	20 December 1991	2 years, 20 days
20	Bob Collins	Labor	Keating	Minister for Shipping and Aviation Support	20 December 1991	27 December 1991	2 years, 20 days
20	Bob Collins	Labor	Keating	Minister for Shipping and Aviation	27 December 1991	27 May 1992	2 years, 20 days
21	Peter Cook	Labor	Keating	Minister for Shipping and Aviation Support	27 May 1992	24 March 1993	301 days

=== List of ministers for shipping ===
The following individuals were appointed as Ministers for Shipping, or any precedent titles:

Order	Minister	Party	Prime Minister	Title	Term start	Term end	Term in office
1	Jack Beasley	Labor	Curtin	Ministers for Shipping	17 October 1942	2 February 1945	2 years, 108 days
2	Bill Ashley	Labor	Curtin	Ministers for Shipping	2 February 1945	6 July 1945	4 years, 320 days
2	Bill Ashley	Labor	Chifley	Ministers for Shipping	13 July 1945	6 April 1948	4 years, 320 days
2	Bill Ashley	Labor	Chifley	Minister for Shipping and Fuel	6 April 1948	19 December 1949	4 years, 320 days
3	George McLeay	Liberal	Menzies	Minister for Shipping and Fuel	19 December 1949	17 March 1950	5 years, 269 days
3	George McLeay	Liberal	Menzies	Minister for Fuel, Shipping and Transport	17 March 1950	11 May 1951	5 years, 269 days
3	George McLeay	Liberal	Menzies	Minister for Shipping and Transport	11 May 1951	14 September 1955	5 years, 269 days
4	John Spicer	Liberal	Menzies	Minister for Shipping and Transport	14 September 1955	27 September 1955	13 days
5	Shane Paltridge	Liberal	Menzies	Minister for Shipping and Transport	27 September 1955	5 February 1960	4 years, 131 days
6	Hubert Opperman	Liberal	Menzies	Minister for Shipping and Transport	5 February 1960	18 December 1963	3 years, 316 days
7	Gordon Freeth	Liberal	Menzies	Minister for Shipping and Transport	18 December 1963	21 January 1966	4 years, 72 days
7	Gordon Freeth	Liberal	Holt	Minister for Shipping and Transport	26 January 1966	19 December 1967	4 years, 72 days
7	Gordon Freeth	Liberal	McEwen	Minister for Shipping and Transport	19 December 1967	10 January 1968	4 years, 72 days
7	Gordon Freeth	Liberal	Gorton	Minister for Shipping and Transport	110 January 1968	28 February 1968	4 years, 72 days
8	Ian Sinclair	Country	Gorton	Minister for Shipping and Transport	28 February 1968	5 February 1971	2 years, 342 days
9	Peter Nixon	Country	Gorton	Minister for Shipping and Transport	5 February 1971	10 March 1971	1 year, 304 days
9	Peter Nixon	Country	McMahon	Minister for Shipping and Transport	10 March 1971	5 December 1972	1 year, 304 days
10	Gough Whitlam	Labor	Whitlam	Minister for Shipping and Transport	5 December 1972	19 December 1972	14 days
11	Bob Brown	Labor	Hawke	Minister for Land Transport and Shipping Support	24 July 1987	4 April 1990	2 years, 254 days
12	Bob Collins	Labor	Hawke	Minister for Shipping	4 April 1990	7 May 1990	2 years, 53 days
12	Bob Collins	Labor	Hawke	Minister for Shipping and Aviation Support	7 May 1990	20 December 1991	2 years, 53 days
12	Bob Collins	Labor	Keating	Minister for Shipping and Aviation Support	20 December 1991	27 December 1991	2 years, 53 days
12	Bob Collins	Labor	Keating	Minister for Shipping and Aviation	27 December 1991	27 May 1992	2 years, 53 days
13	Peter Cook	Labor	Keating	Minister for Shipping and Aviation Support	27 May 1992	24 March 1993	301 days

=== List of ministers for works ===
The following individuals have been appointed as Minister for Works, or any precedent titles:

Order	Minister	Party	Prime Minister	Title	Term start	Term end	Term in office
1	Patrick Lynch	National Labor	Hughes	Minister for Works and Railways	14 November 1916	17 February 1917	95 days
2	William Watt	Nationalist	Hughes	Minister for Works and Railways	17 February 1917	27 March 1918	1 year, 38 days
3	Littleton Groom	Nationalist	Hughes	Minister for Works and Railways	27 March 1918	21 December 1921	3 years, 269 days
4	Richard Foster	Nationalist	Hughes	Minister for Works and Railways	21 December 1921	9 February 1923	1 year, 50 days
5	Percy Stewart	Country	Bruce	Minister for Works and Railways	9 February 1923	8 August 1924	1 year, 181 days
6	William Hill	Country	Bruce	Minister for Works and Railways	8 August 1924	29 November 1928	4 years, 113 days
7	William Gibson	Country	Bruce	Minister for Works and Railways	10 December 1928	22 October 1929	316 days
8	Joseph Lyons	Labor	Scullin	Minister for Works and Railways	22 October 1929	4 February 1931	1 year, 105 days
9	Albert Green	Labor	Scullin	Minister for Works and Railways	4 February 1931	6 January 1932	336 days
10	Charles Marr	United Australia	Lyons	Minister for Works and Railways	6 January 1932	12 April 1932	97 days
11	Bert Lazzarini	Labor	Curtin; Forde	Minister for Works	2 February 1945	13 July 1945	161 days
11	Bert Lazzarini	Labor	Chifley	Minister for Works and Housing	13 July 1945	1 November 1946	1 year, 111 days
12	Nelson Lemmon	Labor	Chifley	Minister for Works and Housing	1 November 1946	19 December 1949	3 years, 48 days
13	Richard Casey	Liberal	Menzies	Minister for Works and Housing	19 December 1949	11 May 1951	1 year, 143 days
14	Wilfrid Kent Hughes	Liberal	Menzies	Minister for Works and Housing	11 May 1951	4 June 1952	4 years, 245 days
14	Wilfrid Kent Hughes	Liberal	Menzies	Minister for Works	4 June 1952	11 January 1956	4 years, 245 days
15	Allen Fairhall	Liberal	Menzies	Minister for Works	11 January 1956	10 December 1958	2 years, 333 days
16	Gordon Freeth	Liberal	Menzies	Minister for Works	10 December 1958	18 December 1963	5 years, 8 days
17	John Gorton	Liberal	Menzies	Minister for Works	18 December 1963	26 January 1966	3 years, 72 days
17	John Gorton	Liberal	Holt	Minister for Works	26 January 1966	28 February 1967	3 years, 72 days
18	Bert Kelly	Liberal	Holt	Minister for Works	28 February 1967	28 February 1968	1 year, 0 days
19	Reg Wright	Liberal	Gorton	Minister for Works	28 February 1968	10 March 1971	4 years, 281 days
19	Reg Wright	Liberal	McMahon	Minister for Works	10 March 1971	5 December 1972	4 years, 281 days
20	Gough Whitlam^{1}	Labor	Whitlam	Minister for Works	5 December 1972	19 December 1972	14 days
21	Jim Cavanagh	Labor	Whitlam	Minister for Works	19 December 1972	9 October 1973	294 days
22	Les Johnson	Labor	Whitlam	Minister for Works	9 October 1973	30 November 1973	1 year, 240 days
22	Les Johnson	Labor	Whitlam	Minister for Housing and Construction	30 November 1973	6 June 1975	1 year, 240 days
23	Joe Riordan	Labor	Whitlam	Minister for Housing and Construction	6 June 1975	11 November 1975	158 days
24	John Carrick	Liberal	Fraser	Minister for Housing and Construction	11 November 1975	22 December 1975	41 days
25	John McLeay	Liberal	Fraser	Minister for Construction	22 December 1975	5 December 1978	2 years, 348 days
26	Ray Groom	Liberal	Fraser	Minister for Construction	5 December 1978	3 November 1980	1 year, 334 days
27	Tom McVeigh	National Country	Fraser	Minister for Construction	3 November 1980	7 May 1982	3 years, 153 days
28	Ralph Hunt	National Country	Fraser	Minister for Transport and Construction	7 May 1982	11 March 1983	308 days
29	Chris Hurford	Labor	Hawke	Minister for Housing and Construction	11 March 1983	13 December 1984	1 year, 277 days
30	Stewart West	Labor	Hawke	Minister for Housing and Construction	13 December 1984	24 July 1987	2 years, 223 days
31	David Beddall	Labor	Keating	Minister for Small Business, Construction and Customs	27 December 1991	24 March 1993	1 year, 87 days
32	Chris Schacht	Labor	Keating	Minister for Small Business, Construction and Customs	24 March 1993	11 March 1996	2 years, 353 days
33	Paul Fletcher	Liberal	Turnbull	Minister for Major Projects, Territories, and Local Government	21 September 2015	16 July 2016	299 days

Notes

^{1} Whitlam was one of a two-man ministry consisting of himself and Lance Barnard for two weeks until the full ministry was announced.

=== List of ministers for land transport ===
Since the creation of the enlarged portfolios in the third Hawke ministry on 24 July 1987 there has usually been a minister or assistant outside cabinet supporting the Minister for Transport and Infrastructure, or any precedent title.

Order	Minister	Party	Prime Minister	Title	Term start	Term end	Term in office
1	Peter Duncan	Labor	Hawke	Minister for Land Transport and Infrastructure Support	24 July 1987	19 January 1988	206 days
1	Peter Duncan	Labor	Hawke	Minister for Transport and Communications Support	19 January 1988	15 February 1988	206 days
2	Peter Morris	Labor	Hawke	Minister for Transport and Communications Support	15 February 1988	2 September 1988	200 days
3	Bob Brown	Labor	Hawke	Minister for Land Transport and Shipping Support	2 September 1988	4 April 1990	4 years, 203 days
3	Bob Brown	Labor	Hawke	Minister for Land Transport	4 April 1990	20 December 1991	4 years, 203 days
3	Bob Brown	Labor	Keating	Minister for Land Transport	20 December 1991	24 March 1993	4 years, 203 days

=== List of ministers for road safety ===
Order	Minister	Party	Prime Minister	Title	Term start	Term end	Term in office
1	Catherine King	Labor	Gillard	Minister for Road Safety	25 March 2013	1 July 2013	98 days
2	Sharon Bird	Labor	Rudd	Minister for Road Safety	1 July 2013	18 September 2013	79 days

== List of assistant ministers ==
Order	Minister	Party	Prime Minister	Title	Term start	Term end	Term in office
1	Jamie Briggs	Liberal	Abbott	Assistant Minister for Infrastructure and Regional Development	18 September 2013	15 September 2015	2 years, 102 days
1	Jamie Briggs	Liberal	Turnbull	Assistant Minister for Infrastructure and Regional Development	15 September 2015	21 September 2015	2 years, 102 days
2	Carol Brown	Labor	Albanese	Assistant Minister for Infrastructure and Transport	1 June 2022	29 July 2024	2 years, 58 days
3	Anthony Chisholm	Labor	Albanese	Assistant Minister for Regional Development	1 June 2022	Incumbent	4 years, 98 days
