= Electoral results for the Division of Dawson =

Australian division election results

This is a list of electoral results for the Division of Dawson in Australian federal elections from the division's creation in 1949 until the present.

== Members ==
Member	Party	Term
Charles Davidson	Country	1949–1963
George Shaw	Country	1963–1966
Rex Patterson	Labor	1966–1975
Ray Braithwaite	National	1975–1996
De-Anne Kelly	National	1996–2007
James Bidgood	Labor	2007–2010
George Christensen	Liberal National	2010–2022
George Christensen	One Nation	2022–2022
Andrew Willcox	Liberal National	2022–present

== Election results ==
=== Elections in the 2020s ===
==== 2025 ====
2025 Australian federal election: Dawson
Party	Candidate	Votes	%	±%
Trumpet of Patriots	Michael Lockyer			
People First	Alexander John Beaumont			
Family First	Amanda Nickson			
Liberal National	Andrew Willcox			
One Nation	Darren Brown			
Greens	Paula Creen			
Labor	Neil Wallace			
Total formal votes				
Informal votes				
Turnout				

==== 2022 ====
2022 Australian federal election: Dawson
Party	Candidate	Votes	%	±%
Liberal National	Andrew Willcox	40,109	43.33	+0.38
Labor	Shane Hamilton	22,650	24.47	+4.19
One Nation	Julie Hall	12,289	13.27	+0.18
Greens	Paula Creen	6,675	7.21	+2.70
Katter's Australian	Ciaron Paterson	5,189	5.61	−0.71
United Australia	Christian Young	3,713	4.01	−0.89
Great Australian	Jim Jackson	1,948	2.10	+2.10
Total formal votes		92,573	95.86	+2.87
Informal votes		4,001	4.14	−2.87
Turnout		96,574	87.49	−3.30
Two-party-preferred result
Liberal National	Andrew Willcox	55,930	60.42	−4.19
Labor	Shane Hamilton	36,643	39.58	+4.19
Liberal National hold		Swing	−4.19	

Alluvial diagram for preference flows in the seat of Dawson in the 2022 federal election. indicates at what stage the winning candidate had over 50% of the votes and was declared the winner.

The sitting member, George Christensen, was elected as a Liberal National, but resigned from the party in 2022, subsequently joining One Nation and contested a Senate seat.

=== Elections in the 2010s ===
==== 2019 ====
2019 Australian federal election: Dawson
Party	Candidate	Votes	%	±%
Liberal National	George Christensen	38,164	42.95	+0.32
Labor	Belinda Hassan	18,022	20.28	−12.48
One Nation	Debra Lawson	11,628	13.09	+13.09
Katter's Australian	Brendan Bunyan	5,619	6.32	−0.22
United Australia	Colin Thompson	4,355	4.90	+4.90
Greens	Imogen Lindenberg	4,009	4.51	−0.65
Democratic Labour	Ann-Maree Ware	2,835	3.19	+3.19
Independent	Lachlan Queenan	2,478	2.79	+2.79
Conservative National	Michael Turner	1,741	1.96	+1.96
Total formal votes		88,851	92.99	−2.47
Informal votes		6,699	7.01	+2.47
Turnout		95,550	90.79	−0.90
Two-party-preferred result
Liberal National	George Christensen	57,405	64.61	+11.24
Labor	Belinda Hassan	31,446	35.39	−11.24
Liberal National hold		Swing	+11.24	

==== 2016 ====
2016 Australian federal election: Dawson
Party	Candidate	Votes	%	±%
Liberal National	George Christensen	38,474	42.61	−3.62
Labor	Frank Gilbert	29,608	32.79	+3.08
Katter's Australian	Ash Dodd	5,904	6.54	−0.20
Greens	Jonathon Dykyj	4,652	5.15	+0.13
Independent	Steven Large	4,184	4.63	+4.63
Glenn Lazarus Team	Michael Hall	4,075	4.51	+4.51
Family First	Amanda Nickson	3,403	3.77	+1.87
Total formal votes		90,300	95.45	+0.30
Informal votes		4,309	4.55	−0.30
Turnout		94,609	91.26	−2.56
Two-party-preferred result
Liberal National	George Christensen	48,167	53.34	−4.24
Labor	Frank Gilbert	42,133	46.66	+4.24
Liberal National hold		Swing	−4.24	

==== 2013 ====
2013 Australian federal election: Dawson
Party	Candidate	Votes	%	±%
Liberal National	George Christensen	40,507	46.23	+0.49
Labor	Bronwyn Taha	26,030	29.71	−10.33
Palmer United	Ian Ferguson	8,777	10.02	+10.02
Katter's Australian	Justin Englert	5,905	6.74	+6.74
Greens	Jonathon Dykyj	4,396	5.02	−2.70
Family First	Lindsay Temple	1,663	1.90	−3.04
Citizens Electoral Council	Andrew Harris	345	0.39	−1.16
Total formal votes		87,623	95.15	+0.91
Informal votes		4,463	4.85	−0.91
Turnout		92,086	93.80	+0.69
Two-party-preferred result
Liberal National	George Christensen	50,451	57.58	+5.15
Labor	Bronwyn Taha	37,172	42.42	−5.15
Liberal National hold		Swing	+5.15	

==== 2010 ====
2010 Australian federal election: Dawson
Party	Candidate	Votes	%	±%
Liberal National	George Christensen	37,940	45.74	+2.62
Labor	Mike Brunker	33,216	40.04	−7.35
Greens	Jonathon Dykyj	6,406	7.72	+3.29
Family First	Damian Herrington	4,100	4.94	+2.09
Citizens Electoral Council	Bill Ingrey	1,287	1.55	+1.07
Total formal votes		82,949	94.24	−1.94
Informal votes		5,070	5.76	+1.94
Turnout		88,019	93.09	−2.32
Two-party-preferred result
Liberal National	George Christensen	43,494	52.43	+5.02
Labor	Mike Brunker	39,455	47.57	−5.02
Liberal National gain from Labor		Swing	+5.02	

=== Elections in the 2000s ===
==== 2007 ====
2007 Australian federal election: Dawson
Party	Candidate	Votes	%	±%
Labor	James Bidgood	38,423	48.09	+16.44
National	De-Anne Kelly	33,948	42.48	−3.04
Greens	Peter Bell	3,489	4.37	+0.93
Family First	Rena Lee	2,398	3.00	−0.09
Democrats	Chris Doyle	1,216	1.52	+0.64
Citizens Electoral Council	Andrew Harris	432	0.54	−1.87
Total formal votes		79,906	96.20	+1.65
Informal votes		3,156	3.80	−1.65
Turnout		83,062	95.04	−0.36
Two-party-preferred result
Labor	James Bidgood	42,520	53.21	+13.20
National	De-Anne Kelly	37,386	46.79	−13.20
Labor gain from National		Swing	+13.20	

==== 2004 ====
2004 Australian federal election: Dawson
Party	Candidate	Votes	%	±%
National	De-Anne Kelly	39,409	48.16	−2.06
Labor	Cherry Feeney	25,626	31.32	−2.45
Independent	Margaret F Menzel	5,647	6.90	+6.90
Greens	Tony W Fontes	2,606	3.19	+0.74
One Nation	Lewis Arroita	2,572	3.14	−5.45
Family First	Bev Smith	2,435	2.98	+2.98
Citizens Electoral Council	Jan Pukallus	2,192	2.68	+1.81
Democrats	Archie Julien	690	0.84	−1.93
New Country	Debbie Lowis	645	0.79	+0.79
Total formal votes		81,819	94.59	−0.69
Informal votes		4,683	5.41	+0.69
Turnout		86,502	94.42	−2.24
Two-party-preferred result
National	De-Anne Kelly	49,399	60.38	+2.39
Labor	Cherry Feeney	32,420	39.62	−2.39
National hold		Swing	+2.39	

==== 2001 ====
2001 Australian federal election: Dawson
Party	Candidate	Votes	%	±%
National	De-Anne Kelly	39,827	50.22	+8.59
Labor	Cherry Feeney	26,782	33.77	−4.25
One Nation	Rob Robinson	6,814	8.59	−7.32
Democrats	Karen Offield	2,195	2.77	+0.75
Greens	Barry Jones	1,940	2.45	+1.12
Independent	Andrew Ellul	1,050	1.32	+1.32
Citizens Electoral Council	Jan Pukallus	692	0.87	+0.87
Total formal votes		79,300	95.28	−1.94
Informal votes		3,930	4.72	+1.94
Turnout		83,230	96.06	
Two-party-preferred result
National	De-Anne Kelly	45,987	57.99	+3.57
Labor	Cherry Feeney	33,313	42.01	−3.57
National hold		Swing	+3.57	

=== Elections in the 1990s ===
==== 1998 ====
1998 Australian federal election: Dawson
Party	Candidate	Votes	%	±%
National	De-Anne Kelly	32,312	41.64	+5.49
Labor	Mark Stroppiana	29,507	38.02	+3.31
One Nation	Barbara Eggers	12,350	15.91	+15.91
Democrats	Darin Preston	1,567	2.02	−1.86
Greens	Helen King	1,027	1.32	+1.32
Independent	Kevin McLean	840	1.08	+1.08
Total formal votes		77,603	97.22	−0.57
Informal votes		2,219	2.78	+0.57
Turnout		79,822	95.01	+0.07
Two-party-preferred result
National	De-Anne Kelly	42,228	54.42	−6.43
Labor	Mark Stroppiana	35,375	45.58	+6.43
National hold		Swing	−6.43	

==== 1996 ====
1996 Australian federal election: Dawson
Party	Candidate	Votes	%	±%
National	De-Anne Kelly	28,359	35.74	−2.68
Labor	Frank Gilbert	28,168	35.50	−2.84
Liberal	Greg Williamson	18,937	23.87	+16.27
Democrats	Kevin Paine	3,095	3.90	+1.39
	Tony Duckett	542	0.68	+0.68
Indigenous Peoples	Len Watson	245	0.31	+0.31
Total formal votes		79,346	97.76	+0.52
Informal votes		1,816	2.24	−0.52
Turnout		81,162	94.94	−0.76
Two-party-preferred result
National	De-Anne Kelly	47,461	59.92	+5.96
Labor	Frank Gilbert	31,744	40.08	−5.96
National hold		Swing	+5.96	

==== 1993 ====
1993 Australian federal election: Dawson
Party	Candidate	Votes	%	±%
National	Ray Braithwaite	29,209	38.71	+0.24
Labor	Frank Gilbert	28,954	38.38	−4.47
Confederate Action	Bob McCulloch	6,838	9.06	+9.06
Liberal	John Mansell	5,545	7.35	−3.36
Democrats	Steve Quadrio	1,884	2.50	−5.44
Greens	Ian Fox	1,795	2.38	+2.34
Independent	Neil Heiniger	625	0.83	+0.83
Independent	Michelle Mac Nevin	597	0.79	+0.79
Total formal votes		75,447	97.24	−0.62
Informal votes		2,141	2.76	+0.62
Turnout		77,588	95.70	
Two-party-preferred result
National	Ray Braithwaite	40,605	53.84	+3.68
Labor	Frank Gilbert	34,811	46.16	−3.68
National hold		Swing	+3.68	

==== 1990 ====
1990 Australian federal election: Dawson
Party	Candidate	Votes	%	±%
Labor	Greg McGarvie	29,869	42.9	−4.0
National	Ray Braithwaite	26,780	38.4	−7.7
Liberal	Jim Seymour	7,459	10.7	+3.6
Democrats	Tom Irelandes	5,566	8.0	+8.0
Total formal votes		69,674	97.9	
Informal votes		1,525	2.1	
Turnout		71,199	95.1	
Two-party-preferred result
National	Ray Braithwaite	34,873	50.1	−1.8
Labor	Greg McGarvie	34,692	49.9	+1.8
National hold		Swing	−1.8	

=== Elections in the 1980s ===
==== 1987 ====
1987 Australian federal election: Dawson
Party	Candidate	Votes	%	±%
Labor	Bill Welch	30,232	46.9	+2.2
National	Ray Braithwaite	29,698	46.1	−6.0
Liberal	Paul Pottinger	4,553	7.1	+7.1
Total formal votes		64,483	96.3	
Informal votes		2,510	3.7	
Turnout		66,993	92.8	
Two-party-preferred result
National	Ray Braithwaite	33,436	51.9	−1.9
Labor	Bill Welch	31,047	48.1	+1.9
National hold		Swing	−1.9	

==== 1984 ====
1984 Australian federal election: Dawson
Party	Candidate	Votes	%	±%
National	Ray Braithwaite	31,299	52.1	+1.2
Labor	John Bird	26,832	44.7	−2.5
Democrats	Antony Lucas	1,913	3.2	+3.2
Total formal votes		60,035	95.7	
Informal votes		2,674	4.3	
Turnout		62,709	93.3	
Two-party-preferred result
National	Ray Braithwaite	32,306	53.8	+2.0
Labor	John Bird	27,729	46.2	−2.0
National hold		Swing	+2.0	

==== 1983 ====
1983 Australian federal election: Dawson
Party	Candidate	Votes	%	±%
National	Ray Braithwaite	35,686	50.1	+0.0
Labor	Barbara Hill	34,229	48.1	+2.9
Independent	Raymond Jensen	426	0.6	+0.6
Independent	Eric Geissmann	423	0.6	+0.6
Progress	Kelly Crombie	420	0.6	+0.1
Total formal votes		71,184	98.9	
Informal votes		815	1.1	
Turnout		71,999	92.6	
Two-party-preferred result
National	Ray Braithwaite		51.2	−6.7
Labor	Barbara Hill		48.8	+6.7
National hold		Swing	−6.7	

==== 1980 ====
1980 Australian federal election: Dawson
Party	Candidate	Votes	%	±%
National Country	Ray Braithwaite	33,205	50.1	−5.8
Labor	Barbara Hill	29,960	45.2	+3.3
Democrats	Brian Caldwell	2,299	3.5	+3.5
Independent	Robert Oakes	539	0.8	+0.8
Progress	Kelly Crombie	330	0.5	−1.7
Total formal votes		66,333	98.4	
Informal votes		1,080	1.6	
Turnout		67,413	93.8	
Two-party-preferred result
National Country	Ray Braithwaite		52.2	−5.7
Labor	Barbara Hill		47.8	+5.7
National Country hold		Swing	−5.7	

=== Elections in the 1970s ===
==== 1977 ====
1977 Australian federal election: Dawson
Party	Candidate	Votes	%	±%
National Country	Ray Braithwaite	34,624	55.9	+3.1
Labor	Michael Goldsborough	25,923	41.9	−3.9
Progress	Frank Paull	1,377	2.2	+2.2
Total formal votes		61,924	98.9	
Informal votes		687	1.1	
Turnout		62,611	94.9	
Two-party-preferred result
National Country	Ray Braithwaite		57.9	+4.3
Labor	Michael Goldsborough		42.1	−4.3
National hold		Swing	+4.3	

==== 1975 ====
1975 Australian federal election: Dawson
Party	Candidate	Votes	%	±%
Labor	Rex Patterson	26,810	45.8	−4.8
National Country	Ray Braithwaite	24,022	41.0	+3.4
National Country	Noel McFarlane	6,936	11.8	+11.8
Independent	Colin Bailey	821	1.4	+1.4
Total formal votes		58,589	98.8	
Informal votes		718	1.2	
Turnout		59,307	95.4	
Two-party-preferred result
National Country	Ray Braithwaite	31,401	53.6	+4.2
Labor	Rex Patterson	27,188	46.4	−4.2
National Country gain from Labor		Swing	+4.2	

==== 1974 ====
1974 Australian federal election: Dawson
Party	Candidate	Votes	%	±%
Labor	Rex Patterson	28,029	50.6	−7.1
Country	Ray Braithwaite	27,363	49.4	+12.5
Total formal votes		55,392	99.0	
Informal votes		581	1.0	
Turnout		55,973	95.5	
Labor hold		Swing	−8.2	

==== 1972 ====
1972 Australian federal election: Dawson
Party	Candidate	Votes	%	±%
Labor	Rex Patterson	28,104	57.7	−5.4
Country	Lionel Bevis	17,998	36.9	+5.0
Democratic Labor	John Judge	2,618	5.4	+0.4
Total formal votes		48,720	98.3	
Informal votes		821	1.7	
Turnout		49,541	95.7	
Two-party-preferred result
Labor	Rex Patterson		58.8	−5.3
Country	Lionel Bevis		41.2	+5.3
Labor hold		Swing	−5.3	

=== Elections in the 1960s ===
==== 1969 ====
1969 Australian federal election: Dawson
Party	Candidate	Votes	%	±%
Labor	Rex Patterson	28,966	63.1	+8.3
Country	John Hinz	14,646	31.9	−10.0
Democratic Labor	Bernard Lewis	2,280	5.0	+1.7
Total formal votes		45,892	99.0	
Informal votes		473	1.0	
Turnout		46,365	95.8	
Two-party-preferred result
Labor	Rex Patterson		64.1	+8.6
Country	John Hinz		35.9	−8.6
Labor hold		Swing	+8.6	

==== 1966 ====
1966 Australian federal election: Dawson
Party	Candidate	Votes	%	±%
Labor	Rex Patterson	22,428	55.7	+14.3
Country	John Fordyce	16,510	41.0	−10.8
Democratic Labor	Bernard Lewis	1,335	3.3	−3.5
Total formal votes		40,273	98.6	
Informal votes		584	1.4	
Turnout		40,857	96.5	
Two-party-preferred result
Labor	Rex Patterson		56.4	+12.8
Country	John Fordyce		43.6	−12.8
Labor hold		Swing	+12.8	

==== 1966 by-election ====
1966 Dawson by-election
Party	Candidate	Votes	%	±%
Labor	Rex Patterson	20,372	55.1	+13.7
Country	John Fordyce	16,572	44.9	−6.9
Total formal votes		36,944	98.8	
Informal votes		433	1.2	
Turnout		37,377	91.0	
Labor gain from Country		Swing	+11.5	

==== 1963 ====
1963 Australian federal election: Dawson
Party	Candidate	Votes	%	±%
Country	George Shaw	19,420	51.8	−0.9
Labor	Doug Everingham	15,508	41.4	+0.6
Democratic Labor	Erwin Eshmann	2,543	6.8	+0.3
Total formal votes		37,471	97.8	
Informal votes		841	2.2	
Turnout		38,312	96.2	
Two-party-preferred result
Country	George Shaw		56.4	−1.5
Labor	Doug Everingham		43.6	+1.5
Country hold		Swing	−1.5	

==== 1961 ====
1961 Australian federal election: Dawson
Party	Candidate	Votes	%	±%
Country	Charles Davidson	19,068	52.7	−8.1
Labor	Cyril Mitchell	14,764	40.8	+11.7
Queensland Labor	Waller O'Grady	2,344	6.5	−3.6
Total formal votes		36,176	97.4	
Informal votes		957	2.6	
Turnout		37,133	95.4	
Two-party-preferred result
Country	Charles Davidson		57.9	−11.0
Labor	Cyril Mitchell		42.1	+11.0
Country hold		Swing	−11.0	

=== Elections in the 1950s ===
==== 1958 ====
1958 Australian federal election: Dawson
Party	Candidate	Votes	%	±%
Country	Charles Davidson	21,424	60.8	−0.4
Labor	Selwyn Ferguson	10,243	29.1	−9.7
Queensland Labor	Waller O'Grady	3,569	10.1	+10.1
Total formal votes		35,236	97.2	
Informal votes		999	2.8	
Turnout		36,235	94.9	
Two-party-preferred result
Country	Charles Davidson		68.9	+7.7
Labor	Selwyn Ferguson		31.2	−7.7
Country hold		Swing	+7.7	

==== 1955 ====
1955 Australian federal election: Dawson
Party	Candidate	Votes	%	±%
Country	Charles Davidson	21,624	61.2	+4.0
Labor	Stanley Dalton	13,541	38.8	−3.5
Total formal votes		34,865	98.3	
Informal votes		618	1.7	
Turnout		35,483	94.9	
Country hold		Swing	+3.8	

==== 1954 ====
1954 Australian federal election: Dawson
Party	Candidate	Votes	%	±%
Country	Charles Davidson	19,828	55.6	−0.7
Labor	George Hyde	15,802	44.4	+0.7
Total formal votes		35,630	99.0	
Informal votes		354	1.0	
Turnout		35,984	96.4	
Country hold		Swing	−0.7	

==== 1951 ====
1951 Australian federal election: Dawson
Party	Candidate	Votes	%	±%
Country	Charles Davidson	19,058	56.3	−2.1
Labor	George Hyde	14,773	43.7	+6.2
Total formal votes		33,831	98.4	
Informal votes		554	1.6	
Turnout		34,385	95.3	
Country hold		Swing	−2.3	

=== Elections in the 1940s ===
==== 1949 ====
1949 Australian federal election: Dawson
Party	Candidate	Votes	%	±%
Country	Charles Davidson	19,302	58.4	+12.3
Labor	George Burns	12,389	37.5	−5.3
Communist	Richard Andrew	1,379	4.2	−3.5
Total formal votes		33,070	98.0	
Informal votes		659	2.0	
Turnout		33,729	93.5	
Two-party-preferred result
Country	Charles Davidson		58.6	+9.8
Labor	George Burns		41.4	−9.8
Country notional gain from Labor		Swing	+9.8	
