= Whitlam ministry =

Whitlam ministry may refer to:

- First Whitlam ministry
- Second Whitlam ministry
- Third Whitlam ministry
