= Snedden shadow ministry =

Shadow ministry of the Australian opposition from 1972 to 1975

The Shadow Ministry of Billy Snedden was the opposition Liberal shadow ministry of Australia from 21 December 1972 to 21 March 1975, opposing Gough Whitlam's Labor ministry. From 1974, it also included members of the Country Party.

The shadow ministry is a group of senior opposition spokespeople who form an alternative ministry to the government's, whose members shadow or mark each individual Minister or portfolio of the Government.

Billy Snedden became Leader of the Opposition upon his election as leader of the Liberal Party of Australia on 20 December 1972 and appointed a new Shadow Ministry.

== Initial Interim Arrangement ==
The following were members of the initial Interim Executive from 21 December 1972, until the full shadow ministry was formally selected and announced on 29 January 1973:

Party	Executive Member	Portrait	Portfolio
Liberal	Billy Snedden (1926–1987) MP for Bruce (1955–1983)		Leader of the Opposition; Leader of the Liberal Party; Interim Opposition Spokesperson on the Economy (from 8 January 1973)
Liberal	Phillip Lynch (1933–1984) MP for Flinders (1966–1982)		Deputy Leader of the Opposition; Deputy Leader of the Liberal Party; Interim Opposition Spokesperson for Economic & Industrial Relations (to 8 January 1973); Interim Opposition Spokesperson on Labour (from 8 January 1973); Interim Opposition Spokesperson for Immigration (from 8 January 1973)
Liberal	Reg Withers (1924–2014) Senator for Western Australia (1968–1987)		Leader of the Opposition in the Senate; Interim Opposition Spokesperson for Transport (from 8 January 1973)
Liberal	Ivor Greenwood (1926–1976) Senator for Victoria (1968–1976)		Deputy Leader of the Opposition in the Senate; Interim Opposition Spokesperson for Legal & Constitutional Affairs (to 8 January 1973); Interim Opposition Spokesperson for Attorney-General Matters (from 8 January 1973)
Liberal	John Gorton (1911–2002) MP for Higgins (1968–1975)		Member of the Interim Executive without Portfolio (to 8 January 1973); Interim Opposition Spokesperson for the Environment and Conservation (from 8 January 1973); Interim Opposition Spokesperson for Urban and Regional Development (from 8 January 1973)
Liberal	William McMahon (1908–1988) MP for Lowe (1949–1982)		Member of the Interim Executive without Portfolio
Liberal	Bob Cotton (1915–2006) Senator for New South Wales (1965–1978)		Interim Opposition Spokesperson for Business, Consumer Affairs, and Transport (to 8 January 1973); Interim Opposition Spokesperson for Housing and Works (from 8 January 1973); Interim Opposition Spokesperson for Postmaster-General Matters (from 8 January 1973)
Liberal	Nigel Bowen (1911–1994) MP for Parramatta (1964–1973)		Interim Opposition Spokesperson for Foreign Affairs and External Territories
Liberal	David Fairbairn (1917–1994) MP for Farrer (1949–1975)		Interim Opposition Spokesperson for National Development; Interim Opposition Spokesperson for Minerals and Energy (to 8 January 1973); Interim Opposition Spokesperson for the Northern Territory (from 8 January 1973)
Liberal	Malcolm Fraser (1930–2015) MP for Wannon (1955–1983)		Interim Opposition Spokesperson for Education and Science (to 8 January 1973); Interim Opposition Spokesperson for Primary Industry
Liberal	Andrew Peacock (1939–2021) MP for Kooyong (1966–1994)		Interim Opposition Spokesperson for Manufacturing Industry, Trade, and Commerce (to 8 January 1973); Interim Opposition Spokesperson for Social Security and Welfare (from 8 January 1973); Interim Opposition Spokesperson for Health (from 8 January 1973)
Liberal	Don Chipp (1925–2006) MP for Hotham (1969–1977)		Interim Opposition Spokesperson for Social Security and Welfare (to 8 January 1973); Interim Opposition Spokesperson for International Trade and Tariffs (from 8 January 1973)
Liberal	James Killen (1925–2007) MP for Moreton (1955–1983)		Interim Opposition Spokesperson for Defence and Veteran Affairs (to 8 January 1973); Interim Opposition Spokesperson for Education and Science (from 8 January 1973)
Liberal	Condor Laucke (1914–1993) Senator for South Australia (1967–1981)		Member of the Interim Executive without Portfolio (to 8 January 1973); Interim Opposition Spokesperson for Pensions and Repatriation (from 8 January 1973); Interim Opposition Spokesperson for Aboriginal Affairs and Welfare (from 8 January 1973)
Liberal	James Forbes (1923–2019) MP for Barker (1956–1975)		Interim Opposition Spokesperson for Health and Community Services (to 8 January 1973); Interim Opposition Spokesperson for Defence (from 8 January 1973)
Liberal	Vic Garland (1934–2022) MP for Curtin (1969–1981)		Interim Opposition Spokesperson for Post and Telecommunications (to 8 January 1973); Assistant to Executive Planning; Interim Opposition Spokesperson for Manufacturing Industry (from 8 January 1973)
Liberal	Peter Rae (1932–) Senator for Tasmania (1968–1986)		Interim Opposition Spokesperson for Social Development

== First Arrangement ==
The following were members of the Shadow Ministry from 29 January 1973 to 14 June 1974:

Party	Spokesperson	Portrait	Portfolio
Liberal	Billy Snedden (1926–1987) MP for Bruce (1955–1983)		Leader of the Opposition; Leader of the Liberal Party; Opposition Spokesperson on the Economy (to 3 August 1973); Opposition Spokesperson for Electoral Matters (to 3 August 1973)
Liberal	Phillip Lynch (1933–1984) MP for Flinders (1966–1982)		Deputy Leader of the Opposition; Deputy Leader of the Liberal Party; Opposition Spokesperson for Labour (to 3 August 1973); Opposition Spokesperson for Immigration (to 3 August 1973); Opposition Spokesperson for the Economy (from 3 August 1973)
Liberal	Reg Withers (1924–2014) Senator for Western Australia (1968–1987)		Leader of the Opposition in the Senate; Opposition Spokesperson for Transport (to 3 August 1973); Opposition Spokesperson for Services and Property (from 3 August 1973); Opposition Spokesperson for Civil Aviation (from 3 August 1973); Opposition Spokesperson for Works (from 3 August 1973); Opposition Spokesperson for the Australian Capital Territory (from 3 August 1973); Opposition Spokesperson for Electoral Matters (from 3 August 1973)
Liberal	Ivor Greenwood (1926–1976) Senator for Victoria (1968–1976)		Deputy Leader of the Opposition in the Senate; Opposition Spokesperson for Attorney-General Matters; Opposition Spokesperson for the Australian Capital Territory (to 3 August 1973)
Liberal	John Gorton (1911–2002) MP for Higgins (1968–1975)		Opposition Spokesperson for Urban and Regional Development; Opposition Spokesperson for the Environment and Conservation
Liberal	William McMahon (1908–1988) MP for Lowe (1949–1982)		Opposition Spokesperson without Portfolio
Liberal	Peter Rae (1932–) Senator for Tasmania (1968–1986)		Opposition Spokesperson for Education and Science
Liberal	Robert "Duke" Bonnett (1916–1994) MP for Herbert (1966–1977)		Opposition Spokesperson for Pensions (to 3 August 1973); Opposition Spokesperson for Repatriation; Opposition Spokesperson for Housing; Assistant to the Opposition Spokesperson for Northern Development, Minerals and Energy; Assistant to the Opposition Spokesperson for the Northern Territory
Liberal	Nigel Bowen (1911–1994) MP for Parramatta (1964–1973)		Opposition Spokesperson for Foreign Affairs and External Territories (to 11 July 1973)
Liberal	James Forbes (1923–2019) MP for Barker (1956–1975)		Opposition Spokesperson for Defence
Liberal	Bob Cotton (1915–2006) Senator for New South Wales (1965–1978)		Opposition Spokesperson for Postmaster-General Matters; Opposition Spokesperson for Works, Services and Property (to 3 August 1973); Opposition Spokesperson for Manufacturing Industry (from 3 August 1973)
Liberal	Malcolm Fraser (1930–2015) MP for Wannon (1955–1983)		Opposition Spokesperson for Primary Industry (to 3 August 1973); Opposition Spokesperson for Labour (from 3 August 1973); Opposition Spokesperson for Immigration (from 3 August 1973)
Liberal	Andrew Peacock (1939–2021) MP for Kooyong (1966–1994)		Opposition Spokesperson for Manufacturing Industry (to 3 August 1973); Opposition Spokesperson for Foreign Affairs and External Territories (from 3 August 1973)
Liberal	Condor Laucke (1914–1993) Senator for South Australia (1967–1981)		Opposition Spokesperson for Social Development, Tourism, Recreation, the Media, and the ABC; Opposition Spokesperson for Aboriginal Affairs and Welfare
Liberal	Don Chipp (1925–2006) MP for Hotham (1969–1977)		Opposition Spokesperson for International Trade and Tariffs (to 3 August 1973); Opposition Spokesperson for Social Security and Welfare (from 3 August 1973); Opposition Spokesperson for Health (from 3 August 1973)
Liberal	David Fairbairn (1917–1994) MP for Farrer (1949–1975)		Opposition Spokesperson for Northern Development, Minerals and Energy; Opposition Spokesperson for the Northern Territory
Liberal	Tony Street (1926–2022) MP for Corangamite (1966–1984)		Opposition Spokesperson for Social Security and Welfare (to 3 August 1973); Opposition Spokesperson for Health (to 3 August 1973); Opposition Spokesperson for Primary Industry (from 3 August 1973); Opposition Spokesperson for Shipping and Transport (from 3 August 1973)
Liberal	Harry Edwards (1927–2012) MP for Berowra (1972–1993) (in Shadow Ministry from 3 August 1973)		Opposition Spokesperson for International Trade and Tariffs (from 3 August 1973)

== Second Arrangement ==
Following the 1974 election, the Shadow ministry was rearranged to include members of the Country Party. The following were members of the Shadow Ministry between 14 June 1974 and 21 March 1975:

Party	Spokesperson	Portrait	Portfolio
Liberal	Billy Snedden (1926–1987) MP for Bruce (1955–1983)		Leader of the Opposition; Leader of the Liberal Party
Liberal	Phillip Lynch (1933–1984) MP for Flinders (1966–1982)		Deputy Leader of the Opposition; Deputy Leader of the Liberal Party; Opposition Spokesperson for the Economy
Country	Doug Anthony (1929–2020) MP for Richmond (1957–1984)		Leader of the Country Party; Opposition Spokesperson for Trade, Resources, and Decentralised Development
Country	Ian Sinclair (born 1929) MP for New England (1963–1998)		Deputy Leader of the Country Party; Opposition Spokesperson for Primary Industry; Manager of Opposition Business in the House
Liberal	Reg Withers (1924–2014) Senator for Western Australia (1968–1987)		Leader of the Opposition in the Senate; Opposition Spokesperson for Services and Property
Liberal	Ivor Greenwood (1926–1976) Senator for Victoria (1968–1976)		Deputy Leader of the Opposition in the Senate; Opposition Spokesperson for Attorney-General Matters
Country	Tom Drake-Brockman DFC (1919–1992) Senator for Western Australia (1959–1978)		Leader of the Country Party in the Senate; Opposition Spokesperson for Repatriation and Compensation
Liberal	Bob Cotton (1915–2006) Senator for New South Wales (1965–1978)		Opposition Spokesperson for Manufacturing Industry
Liberal	Andrew Peacock (1939–2021) MP for Kooyong (1966–1994)		Opposition Spokesperson for Foreign Affairs and External Territories
Liberal	James Forbes (1923–2019) MP for Barker (1956–1975)		Opposition Spokesperson for Defence
Liberal	Malcolm Fraser (1930–2015) MP for Wannon (1955–1983)		Opposition Spokesperson for Labour; Opposition Spokesperson for Public Service Matters
Liberal	Don Chipp (1925–2006) MP for Hotham (1969–1977)		Opposition Spokesperson for Social Security and Welfare
Country	Peter Nixon (1928–2025) MP for Gippsland (1961–1983)		Opposition Spokesperson for Transport
Liberal	Peter Rae (1932–) Senator for Tasmania (1968–1986)		Opposition Spokesperson for Aboriginal Affairs and Community Development
Liberal	Tony Street (1926–2022) MP for Corangamite (1966–1984)		Opposition Spokesperson for Science and Technology; Opposition Spokesperson for the Australian Capital Territory
Liberal	Harry Edwards (1927–2012) MP for Berowra (1972–1993)		Opposition Spokesperson for Tariffs and the Industries Assistance Commission
Country	Ralph Hunt (1928–2011) MP for Gwydir (1969–1989)		Opposition Spokesperson for the Environment and Conservation
Country	Bob Katter (1918–1990) MP for Kennedy (1966–1990)		Opposition Spokesperson for Northern Development; Opposition Spokesperson for the Northern Territory
Liberal	James Killen (1925–2007) MP for Moreton (1955–1983)		Opposition Spokesperson for Education
Liberal	Margaret Guilfoyle (1926–2020) Senator for Victoria (1971–1987)		Opposition Spokesperson for the Media
Liberal	John Carrick (1918–2018) Senator for New South Wales (1971–1987)		Opposition Spokesperson for Urban Improvement
Country	Bruce Lloyd (1937–) MP for Murray (1971–1996)		Opposition Spokesperson for Health
Liberal	Michael MacKellar (1938–2015) MP for Warringah (1969–1994)		Opposition Spokesperson for Immigration
Liberal	John McLeay (1922–2000) MP for Boothby (1966–1981)		Opposition Spokesperson for Housing and Construction
Country	Evan Adermann (1927–2001) MP for Fisher (1972–1984)		Opposition Spokesperson for Customs and Excise; Opposition Spokesperson for Police
Liberal	Peter Durack (1926–2008) Senator for Western Australia (1971–1993)		Opposition Spokesperson for Postmaster-General Matters
Liberal	Bob Ellicott (1927–2022) MP for Wentworth (1974–1981)		Opposition Spokesperson for Consumer Affairs and Commerce; Opposition Spokesperson for Tasmania (from 24 October 1974)

== See also ==
- McMahon Ministry
- Shadow Ministry of Malcolm Fraser
- Second Whitlam Ministry
- Third Whitlam ministry
