= Fraser shadow ministry =

Shadow ministry of the Australian opposition in 1975

The Shadow Ministry of Malcolm Fraser was the opposition Coalition shadow ministry of Australia from 26 March to 11 November 1975, opposing Gough Whitlam's Labor Whitlam ministry.

The shadow ministry is a group of senior opposition spokespeople who form an alternative ministry to the government's, whose members shadow or mark each individual Minister or portfolio of the Government.

Malcolm Fraser became Leader of the Opposition upon his election as leader of the Liberal Party of Australia on 21 March 1975 and appointed a new Shadow Ministry.

== Shadow Ministry ==
The following were members of the Shadow Ministry:

=== Shadow Cabinet ===
Party	Spokesperson	Portrait	Portfolio
Liberal	Malcolm Fraser (1930–2015) MP for Wannon (1955–1983)		Leader of the Opposition; Leader of the Liberal Party
Liberal	Phillip Lynch (1933–1984) MP for Flinders (1966–1982)		Deputy Leader of the Opposition; Deputy Leader of the Liberal Party; Opposition Spokesperson for the Economy
Country/National Country	Doug Anthony (1929–2020) MP for Richmond (1957–1984)		Leader of the Country Party (to 2 May 1975); Leader of the National Country Party (from 2 May 1975); Opposition Spokesperson for Trade, Resources, and Decentralised Development
Country/National Country	Ian Sinclair (born 1929) MP for New England (1963–1998)		Deputy Leader of the Country Party (to 2 May 1975); Deputy Leader of the National Country Party (from 2 May 1975); Opposition Spokesperson for Primary Industry; Manager of Opposition Business in the House
Liberal	Reg Withers (1924–2014) Senator for Western Australia (1968–1987)		Leader of the Opposition in the Senate; Opposition Spokesperson for Services and Property
Liberal	Ivor Greenwood (1926–1976) Senator for Victoria (1968–1976)		Deputy Leader of the Opposition in the Senate; Opposition Spokesperson for Attorney-General Matters
Country/National Country	Tom Drake-Brockman DFC (1919–1992) Senator for Western Australia (1959–1978)		Leader of the Country Party in the Senate (to 2 May 1975); Leader of the National Country Party in the Senate (from 2 May 1975); Opposition Spokesperson for Repatriation and Compensation
Liberal	Bob Cotton (1915–2006) Senator for New South Wales (1965–1978)		Opposition Spokesperson for Manufacturing Industry and Industrial Development
Liberal	Andrew Peacock (1939–2021) MP for Kooyong (1966–1994)		Opposition Spokesperson for Foreign Affairs and External Territories
Liberal	Don Chipp (1925–2006) MP for Hotham (1969–1977)		Opposition Spokesperson for Social Security and Welfare
Country/National Country	Peter Nixon (1928–2025) MP for Gippsland (1961–1983)		Opposition Spokesperson for Transport
Liberal	James Killen (1925–2007) MP for Moreton (1955–1983)		Opposition Spokesperson for Defence
Liberal	John Carrick (1918–2018) Senator for New South Wales (1971–1987)		Opposition Spokesperson for Federalism and Inter-Government Relations

=== Outer shadow ministry ===
Party	Spokesperson	Portrait	Portfolio
Liberal	Peter Rae (1932–) Senator for Tasmania (1968–1986)		Opposition Spokesperson for Aboriginal Affairs and Community Development; Opposition Spokesperson for Tourism; Opposition Spokesperson for Tasmania
Liberal	Tony Street (1926–2022) MP for Corangamite (1966–1984)		Opposition Spokesperson for Labour
Liberal	Harry Edwards (1927–2012) MP for Berowra (1972–1993)		Opposition Spokesperson for Tariffs and the Industries Assistance Commission
Country/National Country	Ralph Hunt (1928–2011) MP for Gwydir (1969–1989)		Opposition Spokesperson for the Environment and Conservation
Country/National Country	Bob Katter (1918–1990) MP for Kennedy (1966–1990)		Opposition Spokesperson for Northern Development; Opposition Spokesperson for the Northern Territory
Liberal	Margaret Guilfoyle (1926–2020) Senator for Victoria (1971–1987)		Opposition Spokesperson for Education
Country/National Country	Bruce Lloyd (1937–) MP for Murray (1971–1996)		Opposition Spokesperson for Health
Liberal	Michael MacKellar (1938–2015) MP for Warringah (1969–1994)		Opposition Spokesperson for Immigration
Liberal	John McLeay (1922–2000) MP for Boothby (1966–1981)		Opposition Spokesperson for Housing and Construction
Country/National Country	Evan Adermann (1927–2001) MP for Fisher (1972–1984)		Opposition Spokesperson for Customs and Excise; Opposition Spokesperson for Police
Liberal	Peter Durack (1926–2008) Senator for Western Australia (1971–1993)		Opposition Spokesperson for Postmaster-General Matters
Liberal	Vic Garland (1934–2022) MP for Curtin (1969–1981)		Opposition Spokesperson for the Australian Capital Territory; Opposition Spokesperson for Public Service Matters; Opposition Spokesperson assisting the Leader of the Opposition
Country/National Country	Ian Robinson (1925–2017) MP for Cowper (1963–1984)		Opposition Spokesperson for Decentralised Development
Liberal	Eric Robinson (1929–1981) MP for McPherson (1972–1981)		Opposition Spokesperson for Science and Technology; Opposition Spokesperson assisting the Treasurer
Liberal	John Howard (1939–) MP for Bennelong (1974–2007)		Opposition Spokesperson for Consumer Affairs and Commerce
Liberal	Ian Wilson (1932–2013) MP for Sturt (1972–1993)		Opposition Spokesperson for Urban Affairs
Liberal	Harold Young (1923–2006) Senator for South Australia (1968–1983)		Opposition Spokesperson for the Media
Liberal	Bob Ellicott (1927–2022) MP for Wentworth (1974–1981) (in Shadow Ministry from 7 April 1975)		Opposition Spokesperson for Aboriginal Affairs (from 7 April 1975); Opposition Spokesperson for Tasmania (from 7 April 1975)

== See also ==
- Shadow Ministry of Billy Snedden
- First Fraser Ministry
- Third Whitlam ministry
