= Department of the Northern Territory =

Department of the Northern Territory may refer to:

- Department of the Northern Territory (1972–75), an Australian government department
- Department of the Northern Territory (1975–78), an Australian government department
