= 1966 Dawson by-election =

← 1963	26 February 1966	1966 →

The Dawson seat in the House of Representatives
- Turnout: 37,377 (91.0%)
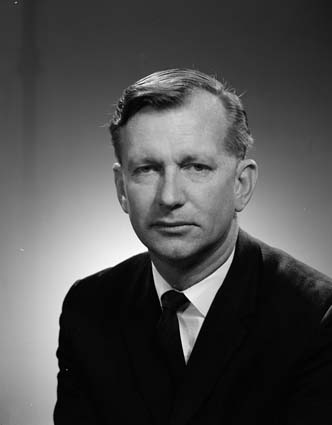

	First party	Second party
Candidate	Rex Patterson	John Fordyce
Party	Labor	National
Popular vote	20,372	16,572
Percentage	55.1%	44.9%
Swing	▲13.7	▼6.9
MP before election
George Shaw
National
Elected MP
Rex Patterson
Labor

A by-election was held for the Australian House of Representatives seat of Dawson on 26 February 1966. This was triggered by the death of Country Party MP George Shaw.

The by-election was won by Labor candidate Rex Patterson.

== Results ==
Dawson by-election, 1966
Party	Candidate	Votes	%	±%
Labor	Rex Patterson	20,372	55.1	+13.7
Country	John Fordyce	16,572	44.9	−6.9
Total formal votes		36,944	98.8	
Informal votes		433	1.2	
Turnout		37,377	91.0	
Labor gain from Country		Swing	+11.5	
