= James Bidgood =

James Bidgood may refer to:

- James Bidgood (politician) (born 1959), Australian politician
- James Bidgood (filmmaker) (1933–2022), American artist
