= Department of Northern Development (Australia) =

Australian government department, 1972–1975

Department overview
- Formed: 19 December 1972
- Preceding Department: Department of National Development
- Dissolved: 6 June 1975
- Superseding Department: Department of Northern Australia
- Jurisdiction: Commonwealth of Australia
- Headquarters: Canberra
- Minister responsible: Rex Patterson, Minister
- Department executive: Ray Livingston, Secretary

The Department of Northern Development was an Australian government department that existed between December 1972 and June 1975.

== History ==
The Department of Northern Development was established in December 1972 charged with overall policy and co-ordination in Australia's development north of the 26th parallel. The government appointed Ray Livingston, formerly a deputy secretary at the Department of Trade and Industry, secretary of the department in the days after its formal establishment.

In June 1975, the department was replaced by the Department of Northern Australia which was an amalgamation of the Northern Development Department and the Department of the Northern Territory.

== Scope ==
Information about the department's functions and government funding allocation could be found in the Administrative Arrangements Orders, the annual Portfolio Budget Statements and in the department's annual reports.

At its creation, the department was responsible for the following:

- In respect of the part of Australia north of the parallel 26 degrees south latitude:
  - Matters related to the specialised development and utilisation of natural resources, being land, water and minerals
  - Matters related to the production and marketing of sugar and beef, and the production, processing and export of minerals
  - Specialised transport development projects, including beef and development roads, mining railways and mineral port facilities
- In relation to the foregoing-
  - The undertaking or support of research
  - The planning or initiation of projects
  - The co-ordination of activities in respect of projects
  - Co-operation with the States and other authorities

== Structure ==
The department was a Commonwealth Public Service department, staffed by officials who were responsible to the Minister for Northern Development, Rex Patterson.
