= 2018 National Party of Australia leadership election =

- 26 February 2018
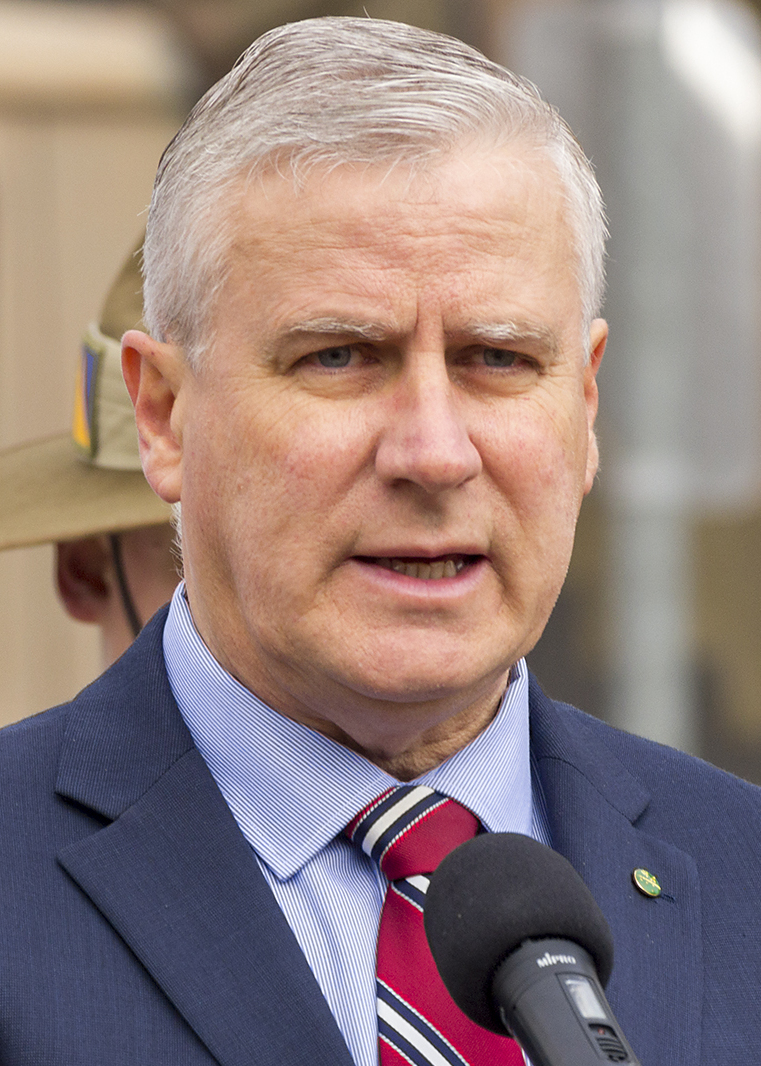

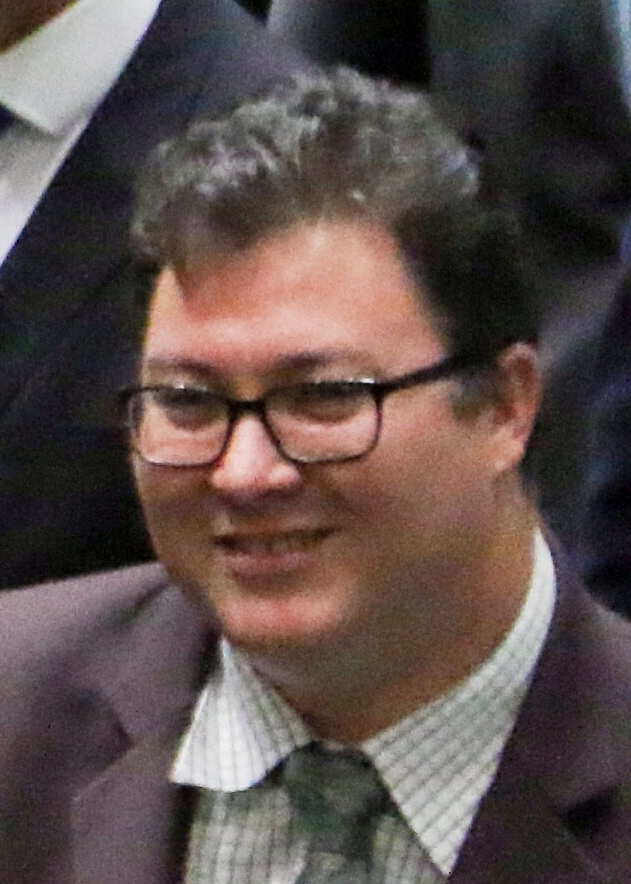
| Candidate | Michael McCormack | George Christensen |
| Caucus vote | ≥11 (Note: The National Party did not divulge how many votes each candidate received.) | <11 |
| Seat | Riverina (NSW) | Dawson (QLD) |
Leader before election
Barnaby Joyce
Elected Leader
Michael McCormack

A leadership election was held on 26 February 2018 to select Barnaby Joyce's replacement as leader of the National Party of Australia and Deputy Prime Minister. Michael McCormack was elected party leader.

On the morning of 26 February, the Nationals held a party room meeting at which Joyce formally resigned to the backbench. McCormack was seen as the favourite to become leader, and was the only declared candidate as at 25 February. At the meeting he secured the support of a majority of the 21 National Party parliamentarians, seeing off a last-minute challenge from Queensland MP George Christensen.

== Background ==
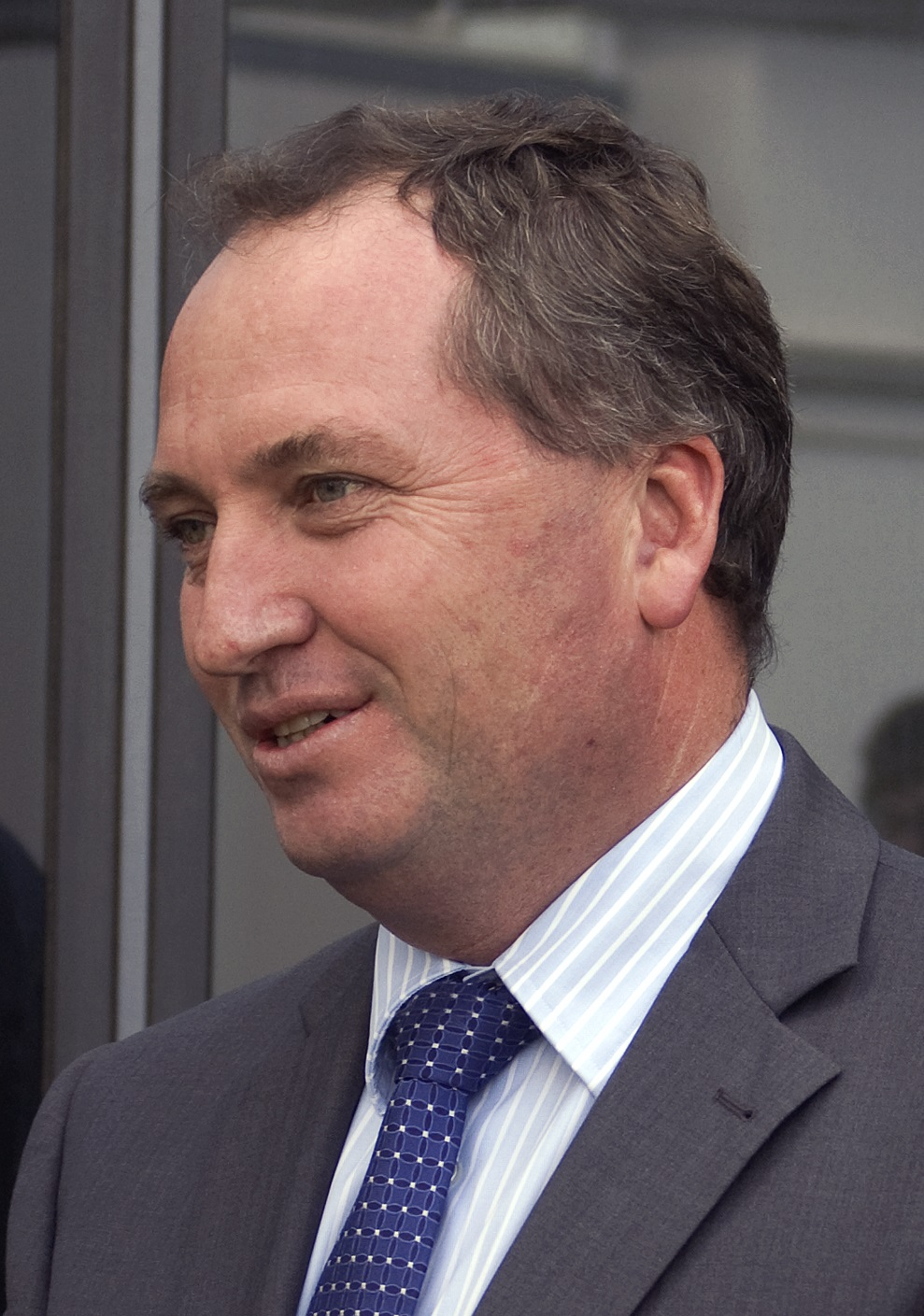
Barnaby Joyce stepped down as leader of the National Party in February 2018

Barnaby Joyce, who had led the National Party since replacing Warren Truss in February 2016, announced on 23 February 2018 that he would resign as party leader during a party room meeting on 26 February. His resignation followed scandals involving an affair with a former staffer and a sexual harassment allegation. Prime Minister Malcolm Turnbull, who was on a state visit to the United States at the time, appointed Regional Development Minister John McVeigh, from the Liberal branch of the Liberal National Party of Queensland, to take on Joyce's cabinet role as Acting Minister for Transport and Infrastructure.

Prior to the events of February 2018, Joyce was viewed as a charismatic leader, who had been re-elected as the member for New England with a substantial and increased majority in a December 2017 by-election. He maintained the support of a majority of his party members even as scandals unfolded, with some exceptions including the party's Western Australian branch and Andrew Broad.

Under the Coalition agreement between the Liberal and National Parties, the Nationals' leader serves as deputy prime minister in a Coalition government. Therefore, the decision of National Party members would determine who succeeded Joyce as deputy PM. Following the 2016 election, sixteen National Party MPs sat in the Australian House of Representatives (including six from the Queensland Liberal National Party, and Joyce himself as a backbencher since his announcement). Some of the highest-profile National Party parliamentarians, namely deputy leader Bridget McKenzie and Resources Minister Matt Canavan, sit in the Senate; no senator has served as deputy prime minister in the history of the position.

== Candidates ==
=== Declared ===
- George Christensen, MP for Dawson since 2010, former Chief Whip from 2016 to 2017
- Michael McCormack, MP for Riverina since 2010, Minister since 2016 (currently for Defence Personnel and Veterans' Affairs)

=== Withdrawn ===
- David Gillespie, MP for Lyne since 2013, Assistant Minister since 2016 (currently for Children and Families)

=== Declined ===
- Darren Chester, MP for Gippsland since 2008, former Minister for Infrastructure and Transport from 2016 to 2017
- David Littleproud, MP for Maranoa since 2016, Minister for Agriculture and Water Resources since 2017

== Endorsements ==
=== Michael McCormack ===
Sitting MPs

- Darren Chester, member for Gippsland
- Mark Coulton, member for Parkes

== See also ==
- National Party of Australia leadership elections
- 2017 New England by-election
