= Third Whitlam ministry =

49th ministry of government of Australia

- 49th Ministry of Australia

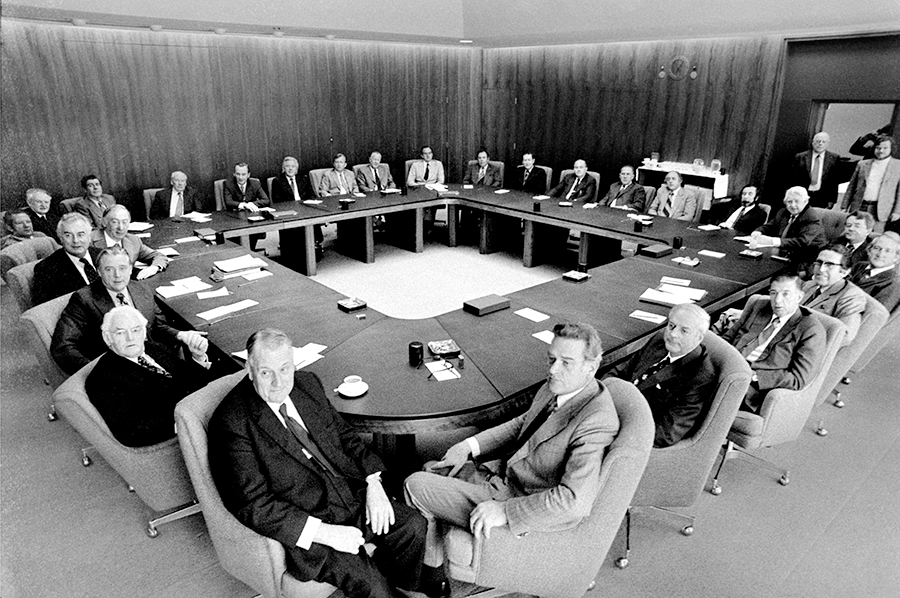
- The third Whitlam ministry meeting at Old Parliament House, Canberra, in 1974
- Date formed: 12 June 1974
- Date dissolved: 11 November 1975

People and organisations
- Monarch: Elizabeth II
- Governor-General: Sir Paul Hasluck; Sir John Kerr
- Prime Minister: Gough Whitlam
- Deputy Prime Minister: Jim Cairns; Frank Crean
- No. of ministers: 31
- Member party: Labor
- Status in legislature: Majority government
- Opposition party: Liberal–National Country coalition
- Opposition leader: Billy Snedden; Malcolm Fraser

History
- Election: 18 May 1974
- Legislature term: 29th
- Predecessor: Second Whitlam ministry
- Successor: First Fraser ministry

The third Whitlam ministry (Labor) was the 49th ministry of the Government of Australia. It was led by the country's 21st Prime Minister, Gough Whitlam. The third Whitlam ministry succeeded the Second Whitlam ministry, which dissolved on 12 June 1974 following the federal election that took place in May. The ministry was replaced by the First Fraser ministry on 11 November following the dismissal of the Whitlam government by the Governor-General, Sir John Kerr.

The order of seniority in the third Whitlam ministry was determined by the order in which members were elected to the Ministry by the Caucus on 10 June 1974, except for the four parliamentary leaders.

As of 5 December 2025, Doug McClelland and Paul Keating are the last surviving members of the third Whitlam ministry.

== Ministry ==
Party	Minister	Portrait	Portfolio
Labor	Gough Whitlam (1916–2014) MP for Werriwa (1952–1978)		Prime Minister; Leader of the Labor Party; Minister for the Environment (from 2 July 1975 to 14 July 1975)
Labor	Jim Cairns (1914–2003) MP for Lalor (1969–1977)		Deputy Prime Minister (to 2 July 1975); Deputy Leader of the Labor Party (to 2 July 1975); Minister for Overseas Trade (to 11 December 1974); Treasurer (from 11 December 1974 to 6 June 1975); Minister for the Environment (from 6 June 1975 to 2 July 1975)
Labor	Rex Connor (1907–1977) MP for Cunningham (1963–1977)		Minister for Minerals and Energy (to 14 October 1975)
Labor	Bill Hayden (1933–2023) MP for Oxley (1961–1988)		Minister for Social Security (to 6 June 1975); Treasurer (from 6 June 1975)
Labor	Lionel Murphy (1922–1986) Senator for New South Wales (1962–1975)		Leader of the Government in the Senate (to 9 February 1975); Attorney-General (to 10 February 1975); Minister for Customs and Excise (to 10 February 1975)
Labor	Don Willesee (1916–2003) Senator for Western Australia (1950–1975)		Minister for Foreign Affairs
Labor	Ken Wriedt (1927–2010) Senator for Tasmania (1968–1980)		Leader of the Government in the Senate (from 9 February 1975); Minister for Agriculture (to 21 October 1975); Minister for Minerals and Energy (from 14 October 1975)
Labor	Frank Crean (1916–2008) MP for Melbourne Ports (1951–1977)		Deputy Prime Minister (from 2 July 1975); Deputy Leader of the Labor Party (from 2 July 1975); Treasurer (to 11 December 1974); Minister for Overseas Trade (from 11 December 1974)
Labor	Fred Daly (1912–1995) MP for Grayndler (1949–1975)		Minister for Services and Property (to 7 October 1975); Minister for Administrative Services (from 7 October 1975); Leader of the House
Labor	Doug McClelland (1926–) Senator for New South Wales (1962–1987)		Minister for the Media (to 6 June 1975); Special Minister of State (from 6 June 1975); Manager of Government Business in the Senate (from 9 July 1974)
Labor	Lance Barnard (1919–1997) MP for Bass (1954–1975)		Minister for Defence (to 6 June 1975)
Labor	Rex Patterson (1927–2016) MP for Dawson (1966–1975)		Minister for Northern Development (to 6 June 1975); Minister for the Northern Territory (to 6 June 1975); Minister for Northern Australia (from 6 June 1975 to 21 October 1975); Minister for Agriculture (from 21 October 1975)
Labor	Clyde Cameron (1913–2008) MP for Hindmarsh (1949–1980)		Minister for Labour and Immigration (to 6 June 1975); Minister for Science and Consumer Affairs (from 6 June 1975)
Labor	Kim Beazley (1917–2007) MP for Fremantle (1945–1977)		Minister for Education
Labor	Lionel Bowen (1922–2012) MP for Kingsford-Smith (1969–1990)		Special Minister of State (to 6 June 1975); Minister assisting the Prime Minister in matters relating to the Public Service (to 6 June 1975); Minister for Manufacturing Industry (from 6 June 1975)
Labor	John Wheeldon (1929–2006) Senator for Western Australia (1965–1981)		Minister for Repatriation and Compensation; Minister for Social Security (from 6 June 1975)
Labor	Tom Uren (1921–2015) MP for Reid (1958–1990)		Minister for Urban and Regional Development
Labor	Reg Bishop (1913–1999) Senator for South Australia (1962–1981)		Postmaster-General; Minister assisting the Minister for Defence (from 6 June 1975)
Labor	Les Johnson (1924–2015) MP for Hughes (1969–1983)		Minister for Housing and Construction (to 6 June 1975); Minister for Aboriginal Affairs (from 6 June 1975)
Labor	Charles Jones (1917–2003) MP for Newcastle (1958–1983)		Minister for Transport
Labor	Doug Everingham (1923–2017) MP for Capricornia (1967–1975)		Minister for Health
Labor	Kep Enderby (1926–2015) MP for Canberra (1974–1975)		Minister for Manufacturing Industry (to 10 February 1975); Attorney-General (from 10 February 1975); Minister for Customs and Excise (from 10 February 1975 to 27 March 1975); Minister for Police and Customs (from 27 March 1975 to 6 June 1975)
Labor	Gordon Bryant (1914–1991) MP for Wills (1955–1980)		Minister for the Capital Territory
Labor	Moss Cass (1927–2022) MP for Maribyrnong (1969–1983)		Minister for the Environment and Conservation (to 21 April 1975); Minister for the Environment (from 21 April 1975 to 6 June 1975); Minister for the Media (from 6 June 1975)
Labor	Jim Cavanagh (1913–1990) Senator for South Australia (1962–1981)		Minister for Aboriginal Affairs (to 6 June 1975); Minister for Police and Customs (from 6 June 1975)
Labor	Bill Morrison (1928–2013) MP for St George (1969–1975)		Minister for Science (to 6 June 1975); Minister assisting the Minister for Foreign Affairs in matters relating to Papua New Guinea (to 6 June 1975); Minister assisting the Minister for Defence (to 6 June 1975); Minister for Defence (from 6 June 1975); Minister assisting the Minister for Foreign Affairs in matters relating to the Islands of the Pacific (from 6 June 1975)
Labor	Frank Stewart (1923–1979) MP for Lang (1953–1977)		Minister for Tourism and Recreation; Vice-President of the Executive Council; Minister assisting the Treasurer; Minister assisting the Minister for Social Security (from 6 June 1975); Minister assisting the Minister for Repatriation and Compensation (from 6 June 1975)
Labor	Jim McClelland (1915–1999) Senator for New South Wales (1971–1978) (in Ministry from 10 February 1975)		Minister for Manufacturing Industry (from 10 February 1975 to 6 June 1975); Minister for Labour and Immigration (from 6 June 1975); Minister assisting the Prime Minister in matters relating to the Public Service (from 6 June 1975)
Labor	Joe Riordan (1930–2012) MP for Phillip (1972–1975) (in Ministry from 6 June 1975)		Minister for Housing and Construction (from 6 June 1975); Minister assisting the Minister for Urban and Regional Development (from 6 June 1975)
Labor	Joe Berinson (1932–2018) MP for Perth (1969–1975) (in Ministry from 14 July 1975)		Minister for the Environment (from 14 July 1975)
Labor	Paul Keating (1944–) MP for Blaxland (1969–1996) (in Ministry from 21 October 1975)		Minister for Northern Australia (from 21 October 1975)

== See also ==
- First Whitlam ministry
- Second Whitlam ministry
