= Second Whitlam ministry =

48th ministry of government of Australia

- 48th Ministry of Australia

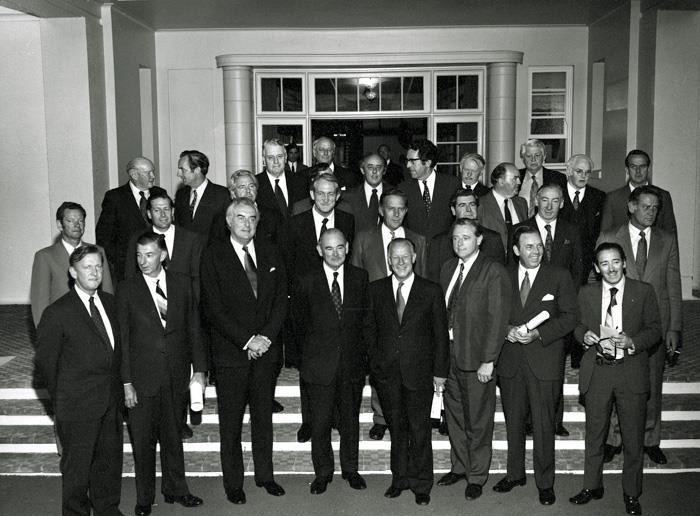
- Governor-General Sir Paul Hasluck with first arrangement of newly appointed ministers to the Second Whitlam ministry
- Date formed: 19 December 1972
- Date dissolved: 12 June 1974

People and organisations
- Monarch: Elizabeth II
- Governor-General: Sir Paul Hasluck
- Prime Minister: Gough Whitlam
- Deputy Prime Minister: Lance Barnard
- No. of ministers: 27
- Member party: Labor
- Status in legislature: Majority government
- Opposition party: Liberal
- Opposition leader: Billy Snedden

History
- Outgoing election: 18 May 1974
- Legislature term: 28th
- Predecessor: First Whitlam ministry
- Successor: Third Whitlam ministry

The Second Whitlam ministry (Labor) was the 48th ministry of the Government of Australia. It was led by the country's 21st Prime Minister, Gough Whitlam. The Second Whitlam ministry succeeded the first Whitlam ministry, which dissolved on 19 December 1972 after the final results of the federal election that took place on 2 December became known and the full ministry was able to be sworn in. The ministry was replaced by the Third Whitlam ministry on 12 June 1974 following the 1974 federal election.

The order of seniority in the second Whitlam ministry was determined by the order in which members were elected to the Ministry by the Caucus on 18 December 1972, except for the four parliamentary leaders, who were elected separately.

As of 5 December 2023, Doug McClelland is the last surviving member of the second Whitlam ministry.

== Ministry ==
Party	Minister	Portrait	Portfolio
Labor	Gough Whitlam (1916–2014) MP for Werriwa (1952–1978)		Prime Minister; Leader of the Labor Party; Minister for Foreign Affairs (to 6 November 1973)
Labor	Lance Barnard (1919–1997) MP for Bass (1954–1975)		Deputy Prime Minister; Deputy Leader of the Labor Party; Minister for Defence; Minister for Supply (to 9 October 1973); Minister for the Army (to 30 November 1973); Minister for the Navy (to 30 November 1973); Minister for Air (to 30 November 1973)
Labor	Jim Cairns (1914–2003) MP for Lalor (1969–1977)		Minister for Overseas Trade; Minister for Secondary Industry (to 9 October 1973)
Labor	Bill Hayden (1933–2023) MP for Oxley (1961–1988)		Minister for Social Security
Labor	Frank Crean (1916–2008) MP for Melbourne Ports (1951–1977)		Treasurer
Labor	Lionel Murphy (1922–1986) Senator for New South Wales (1962–1975)		Leader of the Government in the Senate; Attorney-General; Minister for Customs and Excise
Labor	Don Willesee (1916–2003) Senator for Western Australia (1950–1975)		Special Minister of State (to 30 November 1973); Vice-President of the Executive Council (to 30 November 1973); Minister assisting the Prime Minister (to 30 November 1973); Minister assisting the Minister for Foreign Affairs (to 30 November 1973); Minister for Foreign Affairs (from 6 November 1973)
Labor	Doug McClelland (1926–) Senator for New South Wales (1962–1987)		Minister for the Media
Labor	Rex Patterson (1927–2016) MP for Dawson (1966–1975)		Minister for Northern Development; Minister for the Northern Territory (from 19 October 1973)
Labor	Reg Bishop (1913–1999) Senator for South Australia (1962–1981)		Minister for Repatriation; Minister assisting the Minister for Defence
Labor	Fred Daly (1912–1995) MP for Grayndler (1949–1975)		Minister for Services and Property; Leader of the House
Labor	Clyde Cameron (1913–2008) MP for Hindmarsh (1949–1980)		Minister for Labour
Labor	Tom Uren (1921–2015) MP for Reid (1958–1990)		Minister for Urban and Regional Development
Labor	Charles Jones (1917–2003) MP for Newcastle (1958–1983)		Minister for Transport; Minister for Civil Aviation (to 30 November 1973)
Labor	Kim Beazley (1917–2007) MP for Fremantle (1945–1977)		Minister for Education
Labor	Frank Stewart (1923–1979) MP for Lang (1953–1977)		Minister for Tourism and Recreation; Minister assisting the Treasurer (from 15 February 1973); Vice-President of the Executive Council (from 30 November 1973)
Labor	Jim Cavanagh (1913–1990) Senator for South Australia (1962–1981)		Minister for Works (to 9 October 1973); Minister for Aboriginal Affairs (from 9 October 1973)
Labor	Ken Wriedt (1927–2010) Senator for Tasmania (1968–1980)		Minister for Primary Industry
Labor	Gordon Bryant (1914–1991) MP for Wills (1955–1980)		Minister for Aboriginal Affairs (to 9 October 1973); Minister for the Capital Territory (from 9 October 1973)
Labor	Rex Connor (1907–1977) MP for Cunningham (1963–1977)		Minister for Minerals and Energy
Labor	Al Grassby (1926–2005) MP for Riverina (1969–1974)		Minister for Immigration
Labor	Les Johnson (1924–2015) MP for Hughes (1969–1983)		Minister for Housing (to 30 November 1973); Minister for Works (from 9 October 1973 to 30 November 1973); Minister for Housing and Construction (from 30 November 1973)
Labor	Kep Enderby (1926–2015) MP for Australian Capital Territory (1970–1974) MP for Canberra (1974–1975)		Minister for the Capital Territory (to 9 October 1973); Minister for the Northern Territory (to 19 October 1973); Minister for Secondary Industry (from 9 October 1973); Minister for Supply (from 9 October 1973)
Labor	Lionel Bowen (1922–2012) MP for Kingsford-Smith (1969–1990)		Postmaster-General; Special Minister of State (from 30 November 1973); Minister assisting the Prime Minister (from 30 November 1973)
Labor	Doug Everingham (1923–2017) MP for Capricornia (1967–1975)		Minister for Health
Labor	Moss Cass (1927–2022) MP for Maribyrnong (1969–1983)		Minister for the Environment and Conservation
Labor	Bill Morrison (1928–2013) MP for St George (1969–1975)		Minister for Science; Minister for External Territories (to 30 November 1973); Minister assisting the Minister for Foreign Affairs in matters relating to Papua New Guinea (to 30 November 1973)

== See also ==
- First Whitlam ministry
- Third Whitlam ministry
