= Ray Livingston =

Australian public servant (1922–2006)

Ray Livingston CBE

Secretary of the Department of Northern Development
- In office 20 December 1972 – 6 June 1975

Secretary of the Department of the Northern Territory
- In office 22 December 1975 – 28 September 1978

Personal details
- Born: Ray Stanley Livingston; 29 August 1922 Nyah, Victoria, Australia
- Died: 31 October 2006 (aged 84) O'Connor, Australian Capital Territory, Australia
- Spouse: Winifred Rita Canty
- Children: 3 sons, 3 daughters
- Parent(s): Percy Livingston and Valena Livingston (nee McCartney)
- Education: University of Melbourne
- Occupation: Public servant

Ray Stanley Livingston CBE (29 August 1922 – 31 October 2006) was a senior Australian public servant. He was Secretary of the Department of Northern Development from 1972 to 1975, and from 1975 to 1978 Secretary of the Department of the Northern Territory.

== Life and career ==
Livingston was born in Nyah, Victoria in August 1922. He enlisted in the Royal Australian Air Force in February 1941 during World War II serving as a pilot in Coastal Command in Europe.

Livingston worked with the Departments of National Development from 1950 to 1956 and Trade and Industry from 1956 to 1972. Between 1959 and 1961 he was Commercial Counsellor in Washington DC.

On 20 December 1972, Livingston was appointed Secretary of the new Department of Northern Development. He had formerly been a Deputy Secretary at the Department of Trade and Industry

In 1975 when the Department of the Northern Territory was created, Livingston was named as its Secretary. The matters dealt with by the department at its creation were the administration of the Northern Territory of Australia and the Territory of Ashmore and Cartier Islands The small department was abolished in 1978, with the bulk of its functions transferred to Northern Territory's new self-government.

Livingston was Chairman of the Australian Uranium Export Office from 1978 until his retirement in 1982. He died in October 2006 at the age of 84.

== Awards ==
On 30 December 1978 Ray Livingston was appointed a Commander of the Order of the British Empire in recognition of his dedication to the Australian Public Service. This was announced in the 1979 New Year Honours.

Government offices
Preceded by Lloyd Bott as Secretary of the Department of National Development	Secretary of the Department of Northern Development; 1972 – 1975	Succeeded by Allan O'Brien as Secretary of the Department of Northern Australia
Preceded by Allan O'Brien as Secretary of the Department of Northern Australia	Secretary of the Department of the Northern Territory; 1975 – 1978	No Australian Government successor. Government of the Northern Territory established
