= George Christensen =

Australian politician (born 1978)

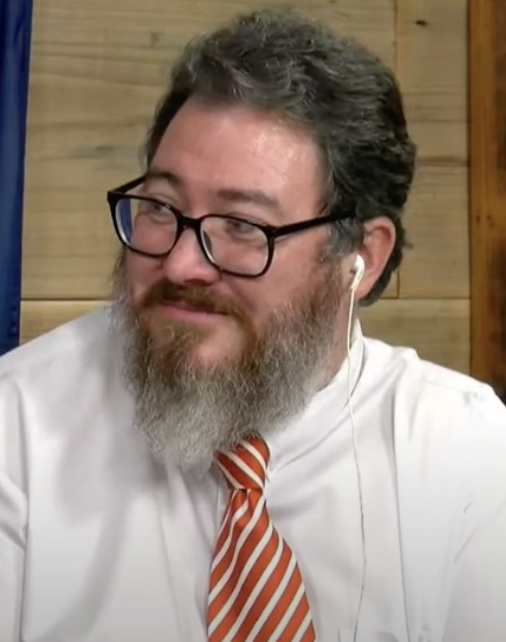
- Christensen in 2022

Councillor of the Mackay Region
- In office 16 March 2024 – 30 May 2025
- Succeeded by: Anne Baker
- In office 15 March 2008 – 21 August 2010
- Succeeded by: Ross Walker

Chief Whip of the National Party
- In office 30 August 2016 – 28 February 2017
- Deputy: Michelle Landry
- Preceded by: Mark Coulton
- Succeeded by: Damian Drum

Deputy Whip of the National Party
- In office 17 October 2013 – 30 August 2016
- Chief Whip: Mark Coulton
- Preceded by: Paul Neville
- Succeeded by: Michelle Landry

Member of the Australian Parliament for Dawson
- In office 21 August 2010 – 11 April 2022
- Preceded by: James Bidgood
- Succeeded by: Andrew Willcox

Councillor of the City of Mackay for Division 7
- In office 27 March 2004 – 15 March 2008

Personal details
- Born: George Robert Christensen; 30 June 1978 (age 48) Mackay, Queensland, Australia
- Party: One Nation (since 2022); Mackay First (since 2024)
- Other political affiliations: Liberal National (2008−2022); National (federal, 1993/94−2022)
- Education: Mackay State High School
- Alma mater: Central Queensland University
- Website: georgechristensen.com.au
- Nickname: Member for Manila

George Robert Christensen (born 30 June 1978) is an Australian politician who most recently served as a member of the Mackay Regional Council. He was a member of the House of Representatives from 2010 to 2022, serving as the member for the division of Dawson. He was a member of the Liberal National Party of Queensland and sat with the National Party in federal parliament, prior to leaving the party in April 2022 to join One Nation and stand unsuccessfully for the Senate at the 2022 election.

Christensen is known for his socially conservative political views. He is also known for his anti-Islamic views and links to far-right organisations and media figures.

== Early years and background ==
Christensen was born in Mackay to third-generation cane farmers; his ancestors emigrated from Denmark in 1901. He is the eldest son to two disability pensioners. He joined the Young Nationals at the age of 15 and was state president of the Queensland Young Nationals from 2003 to 2004. Christensen was schooled in Andergrove, Walkerston and at Mackay State High before completing an undergraduate communications degree in journalism at Central Queensland University in Rockhampton in 2000. As a university student, Christensen was editor of The Student Advocate, a conservative university newsletter, and spent six months work experience at a community newspaper, The Pioneer News.

When he was 21 years old, Christensen briefly attended a seminary in Melbourne with the intention to become a Catholic priest. However, when his father "pointedly objected," Christensen chose not to pursue it. Later, in 2014, he converted to worship in the Antiochian Orthodox Church.

From 2001–2004, Christensen worked as an electorate officer and press secretary for federal Nationals MP De-Anne Kelly.

In 2005, Christensen founded a publishing business with Nicole Ratliff, his girlfriend of the time, to produce two community newspapers Walkerston & Valley Advertiser and Northern Beaches Advertiser. The business folded in 2013.

== Political career ==
=== Local government (2004–2010) ===
In 2004, Christensen was elected to Mackay City Council as a councillor, and in 2008 gained a seat on the amalgamated Mackay Regional Council. He was a director of the Mackay Regional Housing Company and Vice-President of Mackay Regional Council for Social Development. He was the foundation chair of Walkerston Community Kindergarten Association and former chair of HACC Transport Mackay Inc.

=== Federal parliament ===
Christensen ran as the LNP candidate for the seat of Dawson at the 2010 federal election. On 5 February 2010 the sitting member for Dawson, James Bidgood, announced that he would retire for health reasons after only one term. Christensen won the seat with a 5.02-point swing on a two-party-preferred vote with a margin of 2.43 points.

Christensen gained national media attention during the election campaign for articles published by Christensen in the 1990s in The Student Advocate, a conservative university newsletter. The newsletter articles contained slurs against Jews, gays and women. Although Christensen claimed that the articles had been taken out of context, he said he was sorry for publishing the comments.

==== Member for Dawson ====
After the election, it was revealed that Christensen failed to resign from his position on the Mackay Regional Council before the election, putting himself at risk of High Court action which would not allow him to take office as the member for Dawson. Previously, independent Phil Cleary and Liberal Jackie Kelly had been faced with a by-election after failing to resign from public service positions before winning their respective seats. Despite this, several constitutional law experts said it was unlikely any legal challenge against Christensen would be successful because the constitution ban on "officers of profit under the crown" being elected to federal parliament would most likely not apply to local government councillors.

In July 2011, Christensen joined other Liberal National Party MPs in driving the entire Bruce Highway as part of a campaign to highlight problem areas on the road and to secure more funding for the Bruce Highway from the Commonwealth. During the road trip, one of the vehicles in the convoy of MPs hit what Christensen described as a "crater of a pothole" resulting in a tyre blowout.

In June 2011 Christensen drew criticism from fellow MPs for his manner of attack on Labor's shutdown of the live cattle trade to Indonesia. Christensen implied that Indonesia's religion (the dominant Islamic culture) is to blame for the torture of common cattle and that Australian farmers should not receive criticism for Indonesian mistreatment of live cattle exported to the nation.

In September 2012 he accused the National Health and Medical Research Council of demonising the sugar industry due to their recommendation to minimise sugar intake.

Christensen launched a campaign in October 2012 to persuade the producers of science fiction television series Doctor Who to film the program in Australia in celebration of the 50th anniversary of its first screening on Australian television on 12 January 2015. Two Doctor Who stars publicly supported Christensen's campaign.

==== 2013–2016: Second term ====
In the 2013 federal election, Christensen won a second term in office by defeating Labor candidate Bronwyn Taha, adding a further 5.15% to give him a margin of 7.6%.

In March 2013, Christensen told media that he wanted to see the death penalty introduced for serious crimes including murder involving sexual assault. In May 2011, Christensen refused to back a motion condemning the death penalty and instead told federal parliament he supported the death penalty "for terrorists and for those found guilty of the most heinous of crimes – murder of a child, particularly those involving rape, murder of an elderly person or a person with disabilities, again particularly those involving rape".

In May 2014, Christensen stated on Twitter that those criticising the 2014 federal budget should "do a tour of Asia & live like these locals", featuring a photo of an impoverished backstreet in a non-specified country.

In July 2015, Christensen suggested on his website that Australia should consider corporal punishment for drug traffickers, writing that "It's time to do things differently, and I suggest we take a look at how they address the problem in Singapore. Their use of corporal punishment seems to be a highly effective deterrent". In November 2015, Christensen again called for the bringing back of the death penalty.

On 25 February 2016, Christensen renewed calls for the suspension of the Safe Schools Program, an anti-bullying program, with a speech saying elements of the program sounded "a lot like the grooming work that a sexual predator might undertake". On 16 March, after receiving a briefing on a review of the Safe Schools program, Christensen and other conservative MPs declared the review a "stitch-up" with a narrow scope. In a speech later that day, Christensen called for a parliamentary inquiry into the program, linking an alleged "paedophilia advocate" with the foundation of the Safe Schools program.

In April 2016, Christensen introduced the Flags Amendment (Protecting Australian Flags) Bill 2016, which attempted to make it an offence to desecrate the Australian flag, but the bill did not get passed.

==== 2016–2019: Third term ====
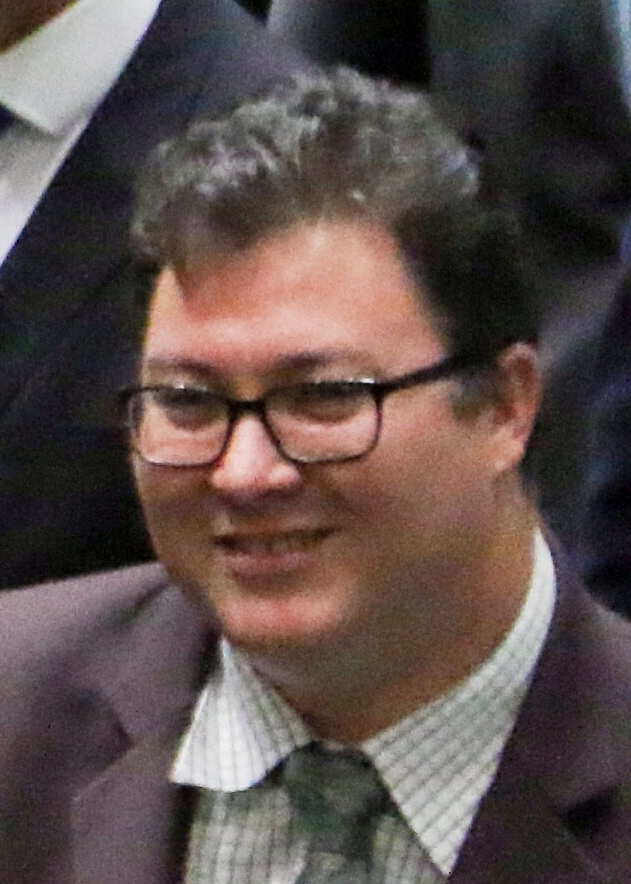
Christensen in 2016

Christensen was returned for a third term at the 2016 federal election, with a reduced margin when there was a 4.51% swing against him towards the Labor Party candidate Frank Gilbert.

Christensen publicly encouraged Americans to vote for Donald Trump in the 2016 US election. Days before the election, Christensen issued a plea on Facebook for Americans to "do the rest of the free world a favour" and vote for Trump.

In February 2017, Cory Bernardi and George Christensen attracted criticism for speaking at the Q Society of Australia. The event received protests who called the event "racist". Christensen resigned as the Nationals' Chief Whip, effective from 1 March 2017, reasoning that being whip is untenable for 'the person that's supposed to be a standard bearer of discipline within the party to be out there talking against some of the Government policies as strenuously as I have been'.

A poll conducted by ReachTel in February 2017 revealed that, given the opportunity, Dawson constituents were equally likely to vote for One Nation as they were for the LNP - taking 30% versus 30.4% of first preference votes. One Nation has not run a candidate in the division of Dawson since Christensen won the seat, however, Christensen voiced his concern in 2016 that he would quite possibly lose his seat if One Nation placed a candidate against him. Christensen voted for One Nation in the 1998 Queensland election.

Christensen repeatedly threatened to resign from the LNP, and in February 2017 wrote a "letter of demand" to the Prime Minister in relation to inaction by the Federal Government to resolve a sugar industry dispute affecting his electorate. His father Ian Christensen wrote on social media "My Dad and George's Grandad, Tony Christensen, farmed the land (and) grew sugarcane for many decades ... If (Prime Minister Malcolm) Turnbull and the others in Cabinet think this is (an) idle threat from George I suggest they have a quick rethink and come down on the Aussie farmers' side." Christensen later apologised to Nationals leader Barnaby Joyce for his resignation threat.

In 2017, Christensen's trip to Malaysia as a "medical tourist" for stomach reduction surgery led to criticism from the Australian Medical Association, "We have a world-class system here in Australia. Why would anyone, much less a federal MP, go overseas to have a procedure they can safely have here? Isn't it the government's job to support our own health system?" While some doctors spoke of Christensen's bravery in speaking publicly about his struggle with weight, there was criticism about the Federal Government's failure to appreciate the "gravity of obesity as a public health problem and commit to meaningful policy and action." Christensen is a vocal supporter of the sugar industry and has rejected policies such as a tax on sugar-sweetened beverages aimed to reduce obesity. In noting a link between low-incomes and obesity, doctors stressed the importance of improving the public health system: "Unfortunately, a lot of our population are not in a position to seek measures like weight loss surgery because they simply can't afford it and our public hospitals are not providing it in anywhere near the numbers required."

On 26 February 2018, he ran a last-minute challenge for the leadership of the National Party against the ultimate winner, Michael McCormack.

==== 2019–2022: Fourth term ====
At the 2019 federal election, held on 18 May 2019, Christensen was returned for a fourth term, with his previous margin increased by 11.43%.

In February 2020, Christensen travelled to the UK with fellow MP Andrew Wilkie to meet Australian WikiLeaks founder Julian Assange, while calling for Assange to be released.

Christensen served on the "Inquiry into the destruction of 46,000 year old caves at the Juukan Gorge in the Pilbara region of Western Australia", which delivered its interim report in December 2020.

During and after the 2021 United States Capitol attack, Christensen, along with fellow backbencher Craig Kelly, aired conspiracy theories relating to the riots on social media. With these riots emboldening white supremacists and other far-right extremists in Australia, the refusal of Prime Minister Scott Morrison to reprimand them was seen as "dangerous" by one expert on violent extremism.

In April 2021, Christensen announced he would not recontest the 2022 federal election, avowing an original intent to serve only three terms, and to spend more time with his family.

In May 2021, several news sources reported that Christensen asked the Liberal National Party to disendorse him, which would have allowed Christensen to pocket a severance payment of over $100,000.

In January 2022, contrary to scientific consensus, Christensen called for Australian parents to not vaccinate their children against COVID-19, prompting the Prime Minister to urge Australians to 'disregard' Christensen's 'dangerous messages.'

On 7 April 2022, Christensen announced his resignation from the Liberal National Party "effective immediately", just days before the election was called, claiming the party was trying to be "all things to all people".

On 12 April 2022, Christensen announced he had joined Pauline Hanson's One Nation and rescinded his retirement to contest the election as a Senate candidate. His term in the House of Representatives had concluded the previous day with the dissolution of parliament before the election. He was placed in third position on One Nation's Senate ticket at the 2022 federal election.

By contesting the election again, albeit in a position on a Senate ticket widely considered unwinnable, Christensen became eligible for the financial payout provided to defeated MPs, in Christensen's case reported to be around $105,000.

=== Return to local government ===
In 2024, Christensen was announced as a candidate for the Mackay First ticket at Mackay Regional Council, led by former rugby league footballer Steve Jackson.

Christensen was successful, and was elected with 4.03% of the vote as one of 10 councillors. He resigned in June 2025

== Australian Federal Police investigations ==
=== Facebook ===
On 18 February 2018, Christensen posted a Facebook photo of himself with a firearm, captioned "do you feel lucky, greenie punks?" (sic); it received widespread criticism and led to an investigation by the Australian Federal Police. He took the post down shortly after. Then-Prime Minister Malcolm Turnbull told 3AW during an interview that the post was "very inappropriate and he took it down after he was spoken to about it".

=== Money transfers ===
Later in the same year, he was again investigated by the Australian Federal Police, due to the discovery of large amounts of money being sent overseas by the MP. The federal police found no crime had been committed under Commonwealth law but did raise concerns over whether he had compromised his position as an MP.

=== Overseas travel to Manila ===
Christensen was criticised for being in the Philippines for more days than he was in Parliament House for two years in a row, taking 28 trips there between 2014 and 2018. The Australian Federal Police again investigated Christensen's travel there and cash transfers, finding no evidence of wrongdoing, but advised then Prime Minister Malcolm Turnbull that Christensen could be detained in Manila for questioning by Philippines police over his activities there. Christensen was criticised for using taxpayer funds for domestic flights which connect with his Manila flights for these visits, and referred himself to the Independent Parliamentary Expenses Authority (IPEA) to prove that this was within the rules. The IPEA found some of Christensen's travel claims were non-compliant, and Christensen repaid the money.

In 2019, Christensen, now dubbed by his colleagues and the media as the "Member for Manila", blocked the release of the AFP travel inquiry documents.

In 2020, former Prime Minister Malcolm Turnbull released details in his memoir of the 2018 police investigation into Christensen's travel to the Philippines, accusing George Christensen of spending up to 100 days a year overseas on full pay while staying in seedy hotels in Angeles City, the red-light district of the Philippines. It was also revealed that both the Australian and Philippines police were concerned that the MP would be a target for blackmail. Turnbull alleged that the AFP told him Christensen was spending "substantial sums in Manila bars and nightclubs as well as making many small payments to women there". Turnbull also alleged that this was against diplomatic advice: "Against the advice of our embassy in the Philippines, he had been staying in seedy hotels in Angeles City, which was not only recklessly unsafe but made him vulnerable to being compromised." Christensen was also making similar trips to Thailand. Turnbull alleged that Christensen threatened him via the dissolving message app, Signal, saying "'remember two words: parliamentary privilege; and two more years of it". Turnbull states that Christensen's "hypocrisy" made him "sick" - as Christensen also claimed to be a devout Christian.

== Political positions ==
=== Climate change ===
In July 2014, Christensen likened climate change to science fiction in a series of comments comparing contemporary statements about climate change to science fiction movie plotlines. In September 2014, Christensen labeled Greenpeace and other environmentalists as terrorists, stating that they are "gutless green grubs" for opposing the expansion of the Abbot Point coal terminal in his electorate. In a speech to Parliament, Christensen said that "the greatest terrorism threat in North Queensland, I'm sad to say, comes from the extreme green movement".

In an interview with SBS Broadcasting Group, Christensen said that there was a conspiracy between the United Nations and most of the world's scientists to "make money out of the world wide carbon trade".

Christensen endorses the climate denial position taken by fellow conservative Member of Parliament, Craig Kelly.

=== Islam ===
In February 2013, Christensen was the only federal MP to attend a rally featuring controversial Dutch politician and anti-Islam campaigner Geert Wilders during his tour of Australia. Christensen said he supported Wilders' view that "people of dual citizenship who act in a way that is contrary to the values of this country and engage in extremist violence should have their citizenship stripped and be deported."

In the wake of the 2012 Sydney anti-Islam film protests in September, Christensen criticised those taking part in the demonstration, saying those who broke the law should "jump on the first plane and head back to where you come from because that stuff is just simply not on in this nation." He also called for authorities to investigate the parents of a young boy who held up a sign which read "behead all those who insult the prophet" during the protests and said the child in question should be put in the care of "better people".

In September 2014, Christensen called for a ban on the wearing of the burqa. In November 2014, Christensen claimed in an online opinion piece that halal certification was "outrageous" and a "religious tax". He also claimed that it is "entirely feasible" to think some halal certifiers could be financing groups such as Hamas or the Muslim Brotherhood. In December 2014, Christensen drew criticism after making comments on Twitter labelling the "I'll Ride With You" online solidarity campaign following the Sydney Siege as a "typical lefty (campaign) that falsely portrays Aussies as thugs who endanger Muslims." In another tweet, Christensen went on to state: "As I suspected. The #illridewithyou campaign is proudly brought to us by another #hatingwhitey lefty activist". The #illridewithyou hashtag was begun during the Sydney Siege, with thousands of people offering to accompany Muslim women on trains, buses, ferries and planes if they felt vulnerable travelling wearing hijabs and burqas. It was inspired by claims about an incident on public transport at the time, which the originator of the claims later confessed on Facebook that she had "editorialised."

On 19 July 2015, Christensen stated in a speech at a Reclaim Australia rally in Mackay that it was "foolishly naive to think that" Australia was not "at war with radical Islam".

In February 2016, Christensen announced the launch of a new website, authorised by his office, to "fight the war on radical Islam." He called for writers and researchers to help him, without pay. As of July 2017 the website reads "Website coming soon" with a masthead depicting a sword, and crosshairs over a person holding a gun.

On 20 September 2017, Christensen moved a motion to ban the burqa at the National Party's annual conference in Canberra. The motion was voted down 51 votes to 55, with Christensen saying he would continue to advocate for the policy.

=== Alt-right media ===
Christensen has a couple of times appeared on alt-right media. In 2017 he appeared on "The Dingoes", a group that runs a podcast titled The Convict Report, which has included guests such as One Nation MP Mark Latham. Christensen has since expressed regret at his appearance. In September 2020, it was reported that Christensen was on "The Unshackled", another alt-right media group. He defended this appearance, with a spokesperson for Christensen, saying that "You do not 'catch' extremism by being interviewed by someone who has also interviewed people with extreme views."

In 2021 Christensen appeared on the TV show of American far-right conspiracy theorist Alex Jones.

=== Abortion ===
Christensen holds an ostensibly anti-abortion stance and has criticised all factions of parliament, including his own party, for funding local and international services which provide abortion. He was an outspoken critic of the Queensland Labor Party's successful effort to decriminalise abortion in 2018 and encouraged members of the public to oppose the reforms at numerous public rallies throughout early 2018.

=== COVID-19 pandemic ===
Christensen was a vocal critic of the Australian government response to the COVID-19 pandemic. In October 2020 he called for the lifting of a ban on hydroxychloroquine in the treatment of COVID-19. In July 2021 he spoke at an anti-lockdown protest in Mackay, alongside QAnon followers. On 10 August 2021, in the Australian federal parliament, he called for an end to lockdowns, considering them ineffectual. He also presented misleading and inaccurate evidence in claims that conflicted with information presented on the Australian Government's Department of Health website. Christensen was quickly censured by the opposition, the government, and the House of Representatives voted unanimously in favour, including his own party.

Facebook removed a video of Christensen's anti-lockdown speech after finding it contained "harmful health information" that breached Facebook's COVID-19 misinformation policy. Christensen also told parents to not vaccinate their children against COVID-19, against scientific consensus and the official policy of the government, of which Christensen was a member.

Christensen caught COVID-19 in April 2022 and self-administered ivermectin, which was not an approved treatment in Australia.

=== Other affiliations and activities ===
At the 2023 annual conference of Church and State (CAS), a conservative Christian "political education ministry" founded by Dave Pellowe in 2018, Christensen gave a talk entitled "The spiritual battle for Western civilisation". Also presenting at the conference were former deputy prime minister John Anderson, One Nation NSW MP Mark Latham, United Australia Party national director Craig Kelly, One Nation Senator Malcolm Roberts, and Joel Jammal, founder and national director of Turning Point Australia.

== Personal life ==
In 2019, Christensen married April Asuncion, whom he met in the Philippines in 2017. A joint investigation between Nine News, The Sydney Morning Herald and The Age alleged Christensen was a regular at the Ponytails bar - an adult entertainment venue in Angeles City. According to Nine News, the manager of the club stated Christensen was a "big spender". The media outlets also alleged that Christensen's wife was an employee at Ponytails. Christensen denied that and called the stories "defamatory".

Parliament of Australia
| Preceded by James Bidgood | Member for Dawson; 2010–2022 | Succeeded by Andrew Willcox |
