= Ray Braithwaite =

Australian politician (born 1933)

Ray Braithwaite OAM

Member of the Australian Parliament for Dawson
- In office 13 December 1975 – 29 January 1996
- Preceded by: Rex Patterson
- Succeeded by: De-Anne Kelly

Personal details
- Born: 6 December 1933 (age 92) Finch Hatton, Queensland
- Party: National Party of Australia
- Occupation: Chartered accountant

Raymond Allen Braithwaite OAM (born 6 December 1933) is a former Australian politician.

Born at Finch Hatton, Queensland, he was a chartered accountant before entering politics. In 1964 he was elected to Mackay City Council, where he remained until 1969. He also served in the military. In 1975, he was elected to the Australian House of Representatives as the National Country Party member for Dawson, defeating Labor minister Rex Patterson. He held the seat until his retirement in 1996.

In his valedictory speech in parliament, Braithwaite thanked the ALP for nominating candidates against him in Dawson who were easy for him to beat at every election he contested.

Parliament of Australia
Preceded by Rex Patterson	Member for Dawson; 1975–1996	Succeeded by De-Anne Kelly
