= Department of the Northern Territory (1975–1978) =

Australian government department, 1975–1978

Department overview
- Formed: 22 December 1975
- Preceding Department: Department of Northern Australia Department of Police and Customs – for NT police
- Dissolved: 28 September 1978
- Superseding Department: Department of Home Affairs (III) – for constitutional development of the Northern Territory
- Jurisdiction: Commonwealth of Australia
- Headquarters: Darwin, Northern Territory
- Minister responsible: Evan Adermann, Minister
- Department executive: Ray Livingston, Secretary

The Department of the Northern Territory was an Australian government department that existed from December 1975 to September 1978. It was the second Australian government department of that name.

== Scope ==
Information about the department's functions and funding allocation could be found in the Administrative Arrangements Orders, the annual portfolio budget statements, and in the department's annual reports.

The matters dealt with by the department at its creation were the administration of the Northern Territory of Australia and the Territory of Ashmore and Cartier Islands.

== Structure ==
The department was a Commonwealth Public Service department, staffed by officials who were responsible to the Minister for the Northern Territory.
