= Department of Northern Australia =

Australian government department, 1975

Department overview
- Formed: 6 June 1975
- Preceding Department: Department of Northern Development Department of the Northern Territory (I)
- Dissolved: 22 December 1975
- Superseding Department: Department of the Northern Territory (II)
- Jurisdiction: Commonwealth of Australia
- Ministers responsible: Rex Patterson, Minister (Jun‑Oct 1975); Paul Keating, Minister (Oct‑Nov 1975); Ian Sinclair, Minister (Nov‑Dec 1975)
- Department executive: Allan O'Brien, Secretary

The Department of Northern Australia was an Australian government department that existed between June and December 1975.

== Scope ==
Information about the department's functions and government funding allocation could be found in the Administrative Arrangements Orders, the annual Portfolio Budget Statements and in the Department's annual report.

The matters dealt with by the department at its creation were:

- Administration of the Northern Territory of Australia and the Territory of Ashmore and Cartier Islands
- In respect of the part of Australia north of the parallel 26 degrees south latitude:
  - Matters related to the specialised development and utilisation of natural resources, being land, water and minerals
  - Matters related to the production and marketing of sugar and beef, and the production, processing and export of minerals
  - Specialised transport development projects, including beef and development roads, mining, railways and mineral port facilities
- In relation to the foregoing:
  - The undertaking or support of research
  - The planning or initiation of projects
  - The co-ordination of activities in respect of projects
  - Co-operation with the States and other authorities

== Structure ==
The Department was a Commonwealth Public Service department, staffed by officials who were responsible to the Minister for Northern Australia. The permanent head of the department was Allan O'Brien, initially based in Darwin and later based in Canberra.
