= Charles Davidson (politician) =

Australian politician

The Honourable Sir Charles Davidson KBE
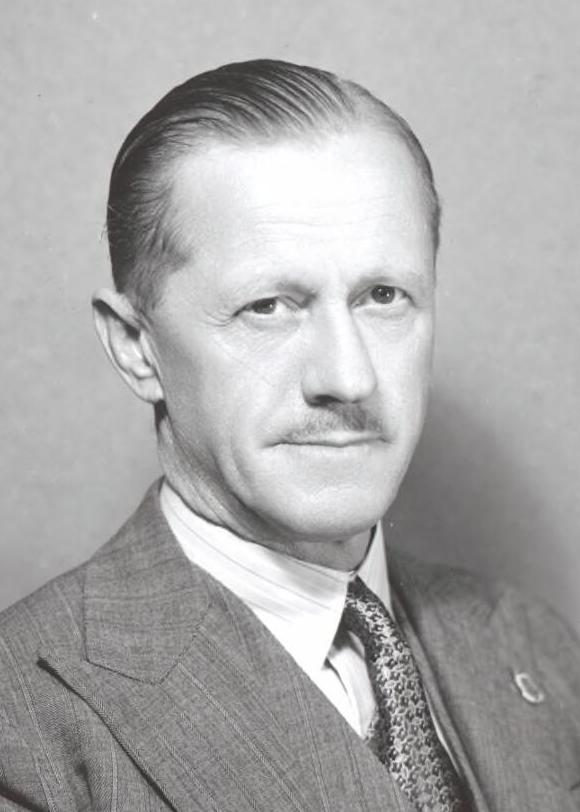

Postmaster-General of Australia
- In office 11 January 1956 – 18 December 1963
- Prime Minister: Robert Menzies
- Preceded by: Larry Anthony
- Succeeded by: Alan Hulme

Minister for the Navy
- In office 24 October 1956 – 10 December 1958
- Prime Minister: Robert Menzies
- Preceded by: Neil O'Sullivan
- Succeeded by: John Gorton

Deputy Leader of the Country Party
- In office 26 March 1958 – 11 December 1963
- Leader: John McEwen
- Preceded by: John McEwen
- Succeeded by: Charles Adermann

Member of the Australian Parliament for Dawson
- In office 10 December 1949 – 1 November 1963
- Preceded by: New seat
- Succeeded by: George Shaw

Member of the Australian Parliament for Capricornia
- In office 28 September 1946 – 10 December 1949
- Preceded by: Frank Forde
- Succeeded by: Henry Pearce

Personal details
- Born: 14 September 1897 Toowong, Queensland, Australia
- Died: 29 November 1985 (aged 88) Yeronga, Queensland, Australia
- Party: Country
- Occupation: Dairy farmer

Sir Charles William Davidson KBE (14 September 1897 – 29 November 1985) was an Australian politician. He was deputy leader of the Country Party from 1956 to 1963 and represented the party in federal parliament from 1946 to 1963. He served as Postmaster-General of Australia (1956–1963) and Minister for the Navy (1956–1958) in the Menzies Government.

== Early life ==
Davidson was born on 14 September 1897 in Toowong, Queensland. He was the third child of Marion (née Perry) and Alexander Black Davidson. His mother born in England and his father in Scotland. Davidson attended Townsville Grammar School until 1914 and then found work as a stockman in North Queensland. He enlisted in the Australian Imperial Force in February 1916 and served on the Western Front with the 42nd Battalion. He was wounded in action in September 1918 and returned to Australia.

== Military service ==
He served in World War I.

During World War II, he served in the 42nd Battalion of the Australian Army in New Guinea, rising to the rank of lieutenant-colonel. He was twice mentioned in despatches and was made an Officer of the Order of the British Empire (Military) in March 1945.

== Political career ==
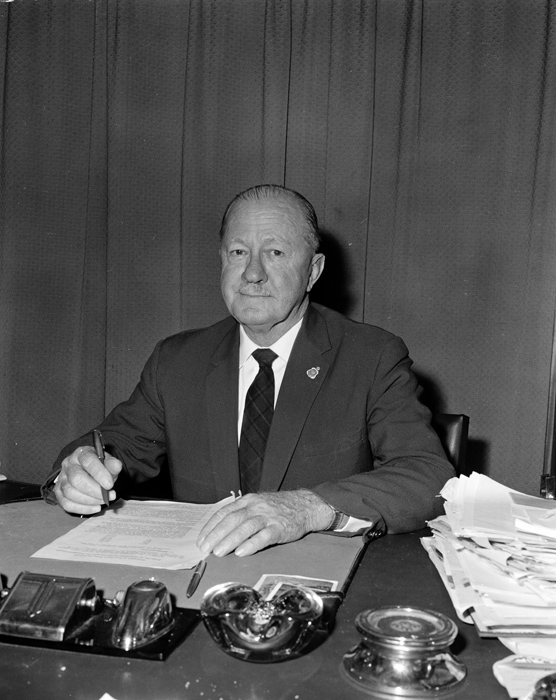
Davidson in 1962.

Davidson was elected to the House of Representatives at the 1946 federal election, defeating Frank Forde – the incumbent Australian Labor Party deputy leader and a former prime minister – in the Division of Capricornia. He received a dual endorsement from the Country Party and the Liberal Party (in the form of the Queensland People's Party). He joined the parliamentary Country Party after his election.

In March 1947, Davidson was one of several MPs to boycott the swearing-in of William McKell as Governor-General of Australia, in protest at the perceived partisanship of his appointment. At the 1949 election, following a redistribution, he was elected the member for the new seat of Dawson. He was Postmaster-General from 1956 to 1963 and Minister for the Navy from 1956 to 1958. In 1958 he was elected deputy leader of the Country Party succeeding John McEwen who had become leader.

He retired at the 1963 election.

Davidson was made a Knight Commander of the Order of the British Empire in June 1964. He died in 1985 and was survived by his wife, a son and two daughters.

== Notes ==
Political offices
Preceded by Larry Anthony	Postmaster-General; 1956–1963	Succeeded by Alan Hulme
Preceded by Neil O'Sullivan	Minister for the Navy; 1956–1958	Succeeded by John Gorton
Parliament of Australia
Preceded by Frank Forde	Member for Capricornia; 1946–1949	Succeeded by Henry Pearce
Preceded by New division	Member for Dawson; 1949–1963	Succeeded by George Shaw
Party political offices
Preceded by John McEwen	Deputy Leader of the Country Party of Australia; 1958–1963	Succeeded by Charles Adermann
