= First Whitlam ministry =

47th ministry of government of Australia

First Whitlam Ministry
- 47th Ministry of Australia

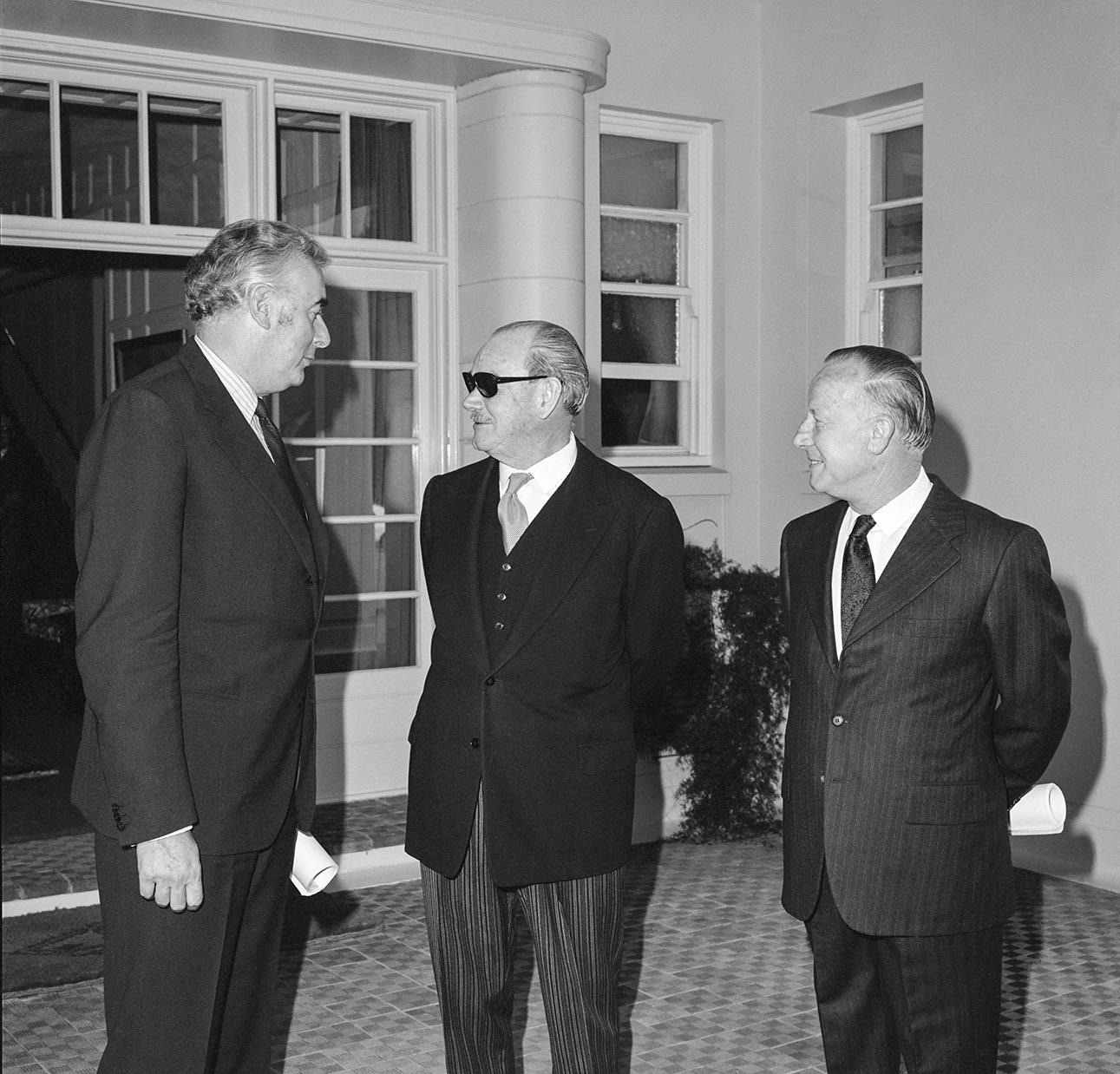
- The First Whitlam Ministry being sworn in by Governor-General Sir Paul Hasluck
- Date formed: 5 December 1972
- Date dissolved: 19 December 1972

People and organisations
- Monarch: Elizabeth II
- Governor-General: Sir Paul Hasluck
- Prime Minister: Gough Whitlam
- Deputy Prime Minister: Lance Barnard
- No. of ministers: 2
- Member party: Labor
- Status in legislature: Majority government
- Opposition party: Liberal

History
- Election: 2 December 1972
- Legislature term: 28th
- Predecessor: McMahon ministry
- Successor: Second Whitlam ministry

The first Whitlam Ministry (Labor) was the 47th ministry of the Government of Australia. Often known as the "two-man ministry" or the "duumvirate", it was led by the country's 21st prime minister, Gough Whitlam. The first Whitlam ministry succeeded the McMahon Ministry, which dissolved on 5 December 1972 following the federal election that took place on 2 December which saw Labor defeat William McMahon's Liberal–Country Coalition. The ministry was replaced by the second Whitlam ministry on 19 December 1972.

Whitlam had just led the Australian Labor Party to victory after 23 years of Coalition rule. Historically, when Labor won government, the caucus elected the members of the ministry, with Labor prime ministers only having the right to allocate portfolios. Although Labor's victory was beyond doubt, counting was scheduled to continue until 15 December, two weeks after the 2 December election.

In accordance with longstanding Australian constitutional practice, the outgoing prime minister, William McMahon, advised the governor-general, Sir Paul Hasluck, that he was no longer in a position to govern. Whitlam then advised Hasluck that he could form a government with his new majority. Normally, McMahon would have stayed on as a caretaker until the final results were known. However, Whitlam was unwilling to wait that long. Accordingly, soon after advising Hasluck that he could form a government, Whitlam had himself and his deputy leader, Lance Barnard, sworn in as an interim two-man government until the full ministry could be chosen. For the next two weeks, Whitlam and Barnard held 27 portfolios between them. It is the smallest ministry in Australian history.

Whitlam, who died in 2014, was the last surviving member of the first Whitlam ministry, having outlived Barnard by 17 years.

== Achievements ==
The duumvirate made 40 significant decisions in its brief tenure, including the immediate release of all draft resisters, the removal of troops from Vietnam and the recognition of Communist China.

== Ministry ==
Party	Minister	Portrait	Portfolio
Labor	Gough Whitlam (1916–2014) MP for Werriwa (1952–1978)		Prime Minister; Leader of the Labor Party; Minister for Foreign Affairs; Treasurer; Attorney-General; Minister for Customs and Excise; Minister for Trade and Industry; Minister for Shipping and Transport; Minister for Education and Science; Minister for Civil Aviation; Minister for Housing; Minister for Works; Minister for External Territories; Minister for the Environment, Aborigines and the Arts
Labor	Lance Barnard (1919–1997) MP for Bass (1954–1975)		Deputy Prime Minister; Deputy Leader of the Labor Party; Minister for Defence; Minister for Supply; Minister for the Army; Minister for the Navy; Minister for Air; Postmaster-General; Minister for Labour and National Service; Minister for Social Services; Minister for Immigration; Minister for the Interior; Minister for Primary Industry; Minister for Repatriation; Minister for Health; Minister for National Development

== See also ==
- Second Whitlam ministry
- Third Whitlam ministry
