= Andrew Willcox =

Australian politician

Andrew Willcox MP
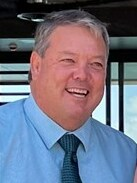
- Willcox in 2021

Member of the Australian Parliament for Dawson
- Incumbent
- Assumed office 21 May 2022
- Preceded by: George Christensen

3rd Mayor of Whitsunday Regional Council
- In office 4 April 2016 – June 2022

Personal details
- Born: Andrew Willcox; 29 January 1969 (age 57) Bowen, Queensland, Australia
- Party: Liberal National
- Occupation: Politician, tomato farmer
- Profession: Politician; journalist
- Website: https://www.andrewwillcox.com.au/

Andrew Willcox (born 29 January 1969) is an Australian politician and former mayor who is a member of the House of Representatives since 2022, representing the division of Dawson. He is a member of the Liberal National Party and sits with the National Party in federal parliament.

== Biography ==
Willcox was born and grew up in Bowen, Queensland, as a third-generation tomato farmer.

Willcox elected on to the Whitsunday Regional Council as a Division 6 councillor in 2012. He was subsequently elected as the mayor of the Whitsunday Regional Council in 2016, and was re-elected to the same position in April 2020.

In August 2021, Willcox was selected as a Liberal National Party candidate for the division of Dawson. In April 2022, he took leave from his mayoralty role to contest the 2022 federal election. He was elected at the federal election on 21 May and subsequently resigned as Mayor officially in June.

Parliament of Australia
Preceded by George Christensen	Member for Dawson; 2022–present	Incumbent
