= George Shaw (Queensland politician) =

Australian politician

George Shaw MP
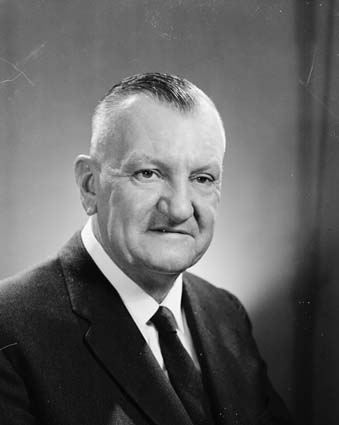

Member of the Australian Parliament for Dawson
- In office 30 November 1963 – 9 January 1966
- Preceded by: Charles Davidson
- Succeeded by: Rex Patterson

Personal details
- Born: 28 July 1913 Rockhampton, Queensland, Australia
- Died: 9 January 1966 (aged 52) South Brisbane, Queensland, Australia
- Cause of death: Cerebral hemorrhage
- Resting place: Mount Thompson Crematorium, Holland Park
- Party: Country
- Occupation: Sugar mill manager; politician

George William Shaw (28 July 1913 – 9 January 1966) was an Australian politician. He was a Country Party member of the Australian House of Representatives from 1963 until his death in 1966, representing the electorate of Dawson.

Shaw was born in Rockhampton and was educated at Mackay High School. He was assistant secretary (1933-1935) and secretary (1935-1943) of the Cattle Creek Co-operative Sugar Milling Association, which operated the Cattle Creek Sugar Mill at Finch Hatton. He was then general manager of the large sugar mill at Farleigh from 1943 to 1964 and was credited with undertaking a rebuilding program at the mill after World War II. From 1949, Shaw was the inaugural deputy chairman of Sugar Research Ltd, which established the industry-backed Sugar Research Institute at Mackay. He was also a state government representative on the Mackay Harbour Board from 1961 to 1963.

In 1963, he was elected to the Australian House of Representatives as the Country Party member for Dawson. He suffered a cerebral hemorrhage on 29 December 1965, the closing date for nominations for preselection to recontest his seat, and defeated a preselection challenge while in hospital, but died in the Mater Hospital, Brisbane on 9 January. He was cremated at the Mount Thompson Crematorium. In the resulting by-election, Dawson was won by Labor for the first time.

Parliament of Australia
Preceded by Charles Davidson	Member for Dawson; 1963–1966	Succeeded by Rex Patterson
