= Rex Patterson =

Australian politician

The Honourable Rex Patterson
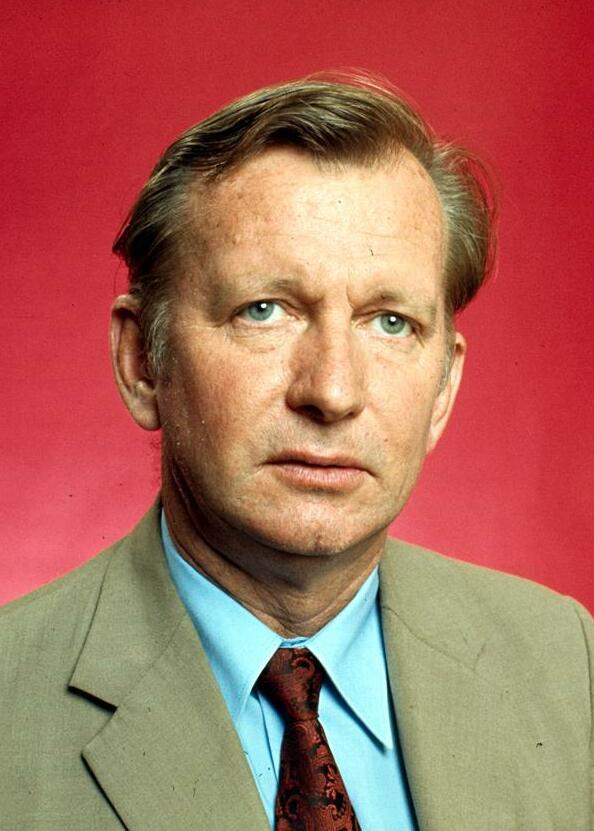
- Patterson in 1973

Minister for Agriculture
- In office 21 October 1975 – 11 November 1975
- Preceded by: Ken Wriedt
- Succeeded by: Ian Sinclair

Minister for Northern Australia
- In office 6 June 1975 – 21 October 1975
- Preceded by: Himself
- Succeeded by: Paul Keating

Minister for the Northern Territory
- In office 19 October 1973 – 6 June 1975
- Preceded by: Himself
- Succeeded by: Paul Keating

Minister for Northern Development
- In office 19 December 1972 – 6 June 1975
- Preceded by: Lance Barnard
- Succeeded by: Himself

Member of the Australian Parliament for Dawson
- In office 26 February 1966 – 13 December 1975
- Preceded by: George Shaw
- Succeeded by: Ray Braithwaite

Personal details
- Born: 8 January 1927 Bundaberg, Queensland
- Died: 13 April 2016 (aged 89) Mackay, Queensland
- Party: Labor
- Education: University of Queensland; Australian National University; University of Illinois; University of Chicago

Rex Alan Patterson (8 January 1927 – 13 April 2016) was an Australian politician. He was a member of the Australian Labor Party (ALP) and held ministerial office in the Whitlam government as Minister for Northern Development (1972–1975), the Northern Territory (1973–1975), Northern Australia (1975), and Agriculture (1975).

== Early life, war service and education ==
Patterson was born in Bundaberg, Queensland on 8 January 1927. He enlisted for war service on 22 February 1945 in Brisbane, Queensland, during the final months of World War II. He served with the Royal Australian Air Force and was discharged on 25 September 1945.

He was educated at the University of Queensland, the Australian National University, the University of Illinois and the University of Chicago.

== Political career ==
Patterson was elected as an Australian Labor Party member for the House of Representatives seat of Dawson, Queensland at a by-election in 1966. He was the first Labor member ever to win it.

When the Whitlam government was elected at the December 1972 election, he was appointed Minister for Northern Development, responsible for the Department of Northern Development, charged with "overall policy and co-ordination in the development of all of Australia north of the 26th parallel". In this role, Patterson was concerned with the Australian sugar and beef industries as well as the specialised development and utilisation of land, water and minerals in northern Australia.

On 19 October 1973, he was sworn in as Minister for the Northern Territory by Queen Elizabeth II, the only occasion when an Australian minister has been sworn in by the Monarch of Australia directly (rather than by the Governor-General of Australia).

On Christmas Day, 1974, the day after Cyclone Tracy, he flew into Darwin with Major-General Alan Stretton and they took responsibility for rebuilding Darwin. In June 1975, Patterson's portfolios were combined and retitled as Minister for Northern Australia.

On 14 October 1975, following Rex Connor's resignation from the ministry, he became Minister for Agriculture. He lost this position when the government was dismissed on 11 November, and lost his seat in the subsequent election.

== Personal life ==
Patterson died on 13 April 2016.

Parliament of Australia
Preceded by George Shaw	Member for Dawson; 1966–75	Succeeded by Ray Braithwaite
Political offices
Preceded by Lance Barnard	Minister for Northern Development; 1972–75	Merged into Northern; Australia portfolio
Preceded by Kep Enderby	Minister for the Northern Territory/ Minister for Northern Australia; 1973–75	Succeeded by Paul Keating
Preceded by Ken Wriedt	Minister for Agriculture; 1975	Succeeded by Ian Sinclair
