= James Bidgood (politician) =

Australian former Labor politician

- Bidgood in 2008

Member of the Australian Parliament for Dawson
- In office 24 November 2007 – 19 July 2010
- Preceded by: De-Anne Kelly
- Succeeded by: George Christensen

Personal details
- Born: 25 May 1959 (age 67) London, United Kingdom
- Party: Australian Labor Party
- Other political affiliations: Labour Party (UK) (before 1991)

James Mark Bidgood (born 25 May 1959) is an Australian former Labor politician who served as a member of the House of Representatives for the seat of Dawson, in north Queensland, from 2007 to 2010. He was elected at the November 2007 federal election, defeating the sitting Nationals member, De-Anne Kelly, in a major upset. Kelly was not thought to be in any danger going into the election; she had gone into the election sitting on a seemingly safe majority of 10 percent. However, in one of the biggest swings of the election, Bidgood picked up a swing of over 13 percent (initially calculated as 16 percent) amid the Labor wave that swept through Queensland. He was only the second Labor member ever to win it, and the first since 1974. He retired in 2010 due to ill health.

Bidgood was born in the United Kingdom and grew up in the East End of London. He has an Open University honours degree in social science majoring in politics and economics. He was a member of the British Labour Party before coming to Australia as a backpacker in 1991 and settling in Mackay. Before his election he was a Councillor on the Mackay City Council and was Financial Director of Caneland Medical Centre in Mackay. When he attended his first Caucus meeting in Canberra on 29 November 2007, it was first the time he had ever been to the national capital.

On 13 November 2008, Bidgood was forced to clarify his comments in the House of Representatives after stating, earlier that day in an interview, that Prime Minister Kevin Rudd was indiscreet in his handling of a telephone conversation between himself and U.S. President George W. Bush.

On 3 December 2008, Bidgood was forced to publicly apologise after taking and selling photographs of protester Marat Aminov, who had been threatening to set himself on fire outside Parliament House, Canberra. Aminov's multiple protest efforts had been aimed at securing aged-parent visas for his mother and father. Bidgood sold photographs to News Ltd newspapers, with instructions to send the proceeds to a charity. Kevin Rudd described Bidgood's actions as "deeply offensive".

Bidgood is a devout Christian, and claims the 1987 stockmarket crash was caused by Christian marches for Jesus in London. On 4 December 2008, The Australian newspaper reported that Bidgood made a speech in parliament declaring that the 2008 financial crisis was an act of God, linking it to eschatology.

Bidgood announced his decision to retire on 5 February 2010, citing health reasons.

Parliament of Australia
Preceded by De-Anne Kelly	Member for Dawson; 2007–2010	Succeeded by George Christensen
