= De-Anne Kelly =

Australian politician (born 1954)

The Honourable De-Anne Kelly
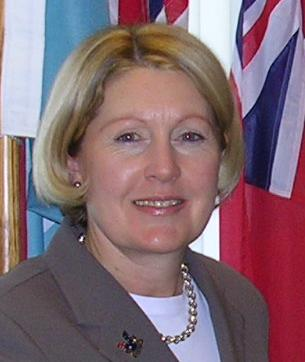
- Kelly in 2006

Minister for Veterans' Affairs
- In office 26 October 2004 – 27 January 2006
- Preceded by: Danna Vale
- Succeeded by: Bruce Billson

Member of the Australian Parliament for Dawson
- In office 2 March 1996 – 24 November 2007
- Preceded by: Ray Braithwaite
- Succeeded by: James Bidgood

Personal details
- Born: 21 March 1954 (age 72) Rockhampton, Queensland, Australia
- Party: National Party of Australia
- Spouse: Roger Kelly
- Education: University of Queensland
- Occupation: Farmer

De-Anne Margaret Kelly (née Park; born 21 March 1954) is an Australian former politician.

Kelly was a National Party member of the Australian House of Representatives from March 1996 until November 2007, representing the Division of Dawson, Queensland.

She was the first female member of the National Party to win a seat in the House of Representatives.

== Personal life ==
Kelly was born in Rockhampton, Queensland to parents Ian Park and Margaret Park (née Bauman). Kelly's uncle was Kerrod Park, who was known for his involvement with local government in Queensland, having served as the chairman of Duaringa Shire Council from 1973 to 1994.

Kelly grew up on a cattle property where she obtained her primary education from her mother who taught her at the kitchen table. She then attended high school in Rockhampton and after winning a scholarship to study electrical engineering, Kelly attended the University of Queensland.

After graduating, Kelly worked as an engineer before she bought a small manufacturing business with her husband. Seven years later, she and her husband purchased a cattle property near Dingo where they lived in a shed with their infant son.

In 2004, she and her husband owned and operated a sugar cane farm at Mirani, near Mackay.

== Parliamentary career ==
In her first parliamentary speech, Kelly paid tribute to her late father Ian Park who she commended for having a "girls can do anything" attitude. She also said she owed her character and convictions to her father. In her speech, Kelly also said she drew inspiration from Lady Florence Bjelke-Petersen who had taught her some "valuable lessons".

Kelly was Parliamentary Secretary to the Minister for Transport and Regional Services and Parliamentary Secretary to the Minister for Trade between October 2003 and October 2004, at which time she was appointed Minister for Veterans' Affairs. She gained the additional position of Minister Assisting the Minister for Defence in November 2004, but was demoted to Parliamentary Secretary (Trade) in January 2006. Kelly served in this position until September 2006, when she was reappointed Parliamentary Secretary to the Minister for Transport and Regional Services.

At the 2007 general election, Kelly was unseated by Labor candidate and City of Mackay councillor James Bidgood. Kelly went into the election sitting on a majority of over 10 percent. However, as part of the Labor wave that swept through Queensland in that election, Bidgood defeated her on a swing of more than 13 per cent. Kelly's defeat came as a surprise to most commentators; due to her large majority, there was no hint she was in any danger.

Political offices
Preceded by Danna Vale	Minister for Veterans' Affairs; 2004–2006	Succeeded by Bruce Billson
Parliament of Australia
Preceded by Ray Braithwaite	Member for Dawson; 1996–2007	Succeeded by James Bidgood
