= Division of Dawson =

Australian federal electoral division

Coordinates: 20.204°S 148.003°E

Dawson Australian House of Representatives Division
- Interactive map of boundaries since the 2019 federal election
- Created: 1949
- MP: Andrew Willcox
- Party: National (Note: Member of the Liberal National Party of Queensland sitting with the federal parliamentary National Party.)
- Namesake: Anderson Dawson
- Electors: 117,233 (2025)
- Area: 14,630 km^{2} (5,648.7 sq mi)
- Demographic: Provincial and rural
Electorates around Dawson:
| Herbert | Coral Sea | Coral Sea |
| Kennedy | Dawson | Coral Sea |
| Capricornia | Capricornia | Coral Sea |

The Division of Dawson is an Australian electoral division in the state of Queensland. It comprises the city of Mackay and the coastal region north-west, including the Whitsunday Islands, until the south-eastern suburbs of Townsville on the right bank of the Ross River.

Since 2022 its MP has been Andrew Willcox of the National Party.

== Geography ==
Since 1984, federal electoral division boundaries in Australia have been determined at redistributions by a redistribution committee appointed by the Australian Electoral Commission. Redistributions occur for the boundaries of divisions in a particular state, and they occur every seven years, or sooner if a state's representation entitlement changes or when divisions of a state are malapportioned.

The Division of Dawson includes the city of Mackay, as well as other neighbouring towns to the north-west, including Farleigh, Kuttabul, Mount Ossa, Seaforth and Calen. Along the Bruce Highway other towns include Bloomsbury, Proserpine, Bowen, Home Hill, Ayr and Giru until the south-eastern suburbs of Townsville on the right bank of the Ross River. It also includes the Whitsunday Islands.

== History ==
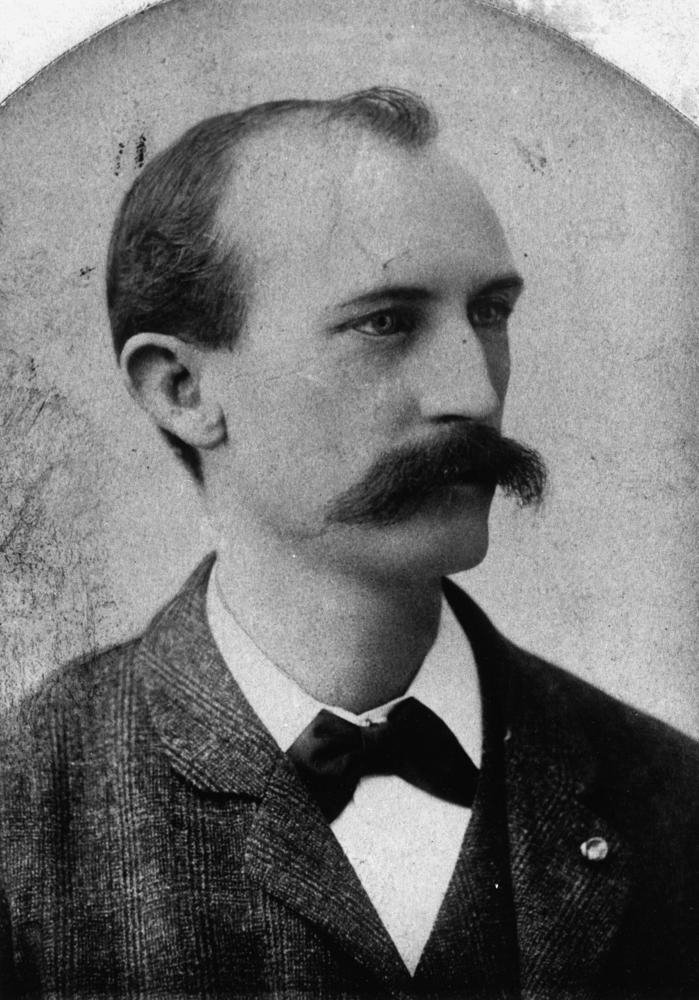
Anderson Dawson, the division's namesake

The division was created in 1949 and is named after Anderson Dawson, the first Labor Premier of Queensland and leader of the first parliamentary socialist government anywhere in the world.

Apart from a period from 1966 to 1975 and 2007 to 2010, it has been held by the National Party. While Mackay, the largest city wholly within the electorate, is a longstanding Labor stronghold, it is usually not enough to overcome the region's overall conservative leaning.

== Members ==
| Image | Member | Party | Term | Notes |
|---|---|---|---|---|
| | Charles Davidson (1897–1985) | Country | 10 December 1949 – 1 November 1963 | Previously held the Division of Capricornia. Served as minister under Menzies. Retired |
| | George Shaw (1913–1966) | Country | 30 November 1963 – 9 January 1966 | Died in office |
| | Rex Patterson (1927–2016) | Labor | 26 February 1966 – 13 December 1975 | Served as minister under Whitlam. Lost seat |
| | Ray Braithwaite (1933–) | National Country | 13 December 1975 – 16 October 1982 | Retired |
| | Ray Braithwaite (1933–) | Nationals | 16 October 1982 – 29 January 1996 | Retired |
| | De-Anne Kelly (1954–) | Nationals | 2 March 1996 – 24 November 2007 | Served as minister under Howard. Lost seat |
| | James Bidgood (1959–) | Labor | 24 November 2007 – 19 July 2010 | Retired |
| | George Christensen (1978–) | National | 21 August 2010 – 11 April 2022 | Did not contest in 2022. Failed to win a Senate seat for One Nation |
| | Andrew Willcox (1969–) | National | 21 May 2022 – present | Incumbent |

== Election results ==
2025 Australian federal election: Dawson
| Party | Candidate | Votes | % | ±% |
|---|---|---|---|---|
| Liberal National | Andrew Willcox | 41,043 | 41.68 | −1.65 |
| Labor | Neil Wallace | 25,808 | 26.21 | +1.74 |
| One Nation | Darren Brown | 10,258 | 10.42 | −2.85 |
| Greens | Paula Creen | 6,944 | 7.05 | −0.16 |
| Trumpet of Patriots | Michael Lockyer | 5,673 | 5.76 | +5.76 |
| People First | Alexander Beaumont | 5,572 | 5.66 | +5.66 |
| Family First | Amanda Nickson | 3,170 | 3.22 | +3.22 |
| Total formal votes | | 98,468 | 95.31 | −0.55 |
| Informal votes | | 4,849 | 4.69 | +0.55 |
| Turnout | | 103,317 | 88.15 | +0.66 |
Two-party-preferred result
| Liberal National | Andrew Willcox | 60,881 | 61.83 | +1.41 |
| Labor | Neil Wallace | 37,587 | 38.17 | −1.41 |
| Liberal National hold | | Swing | +1.41 | |
