= Department of the Northern Territory (1972–1975) =

Australian federal government department, 1972–1975

Department overview
- Formed: 19 December 1972
- Preceding Department: Department of the Interior (II) - the Northern Territory Division
- Dissolved: 6 June 1975
- Superseding Department: Department of Northern Australia
- Jurisdiction: Commonwealth of Australia
- Headquarters: Darwin, Northern Territory
- Ministers responsible: Kep Enderby, Minister (1972‑73); Rex Patterson, Minister (1973‑75)
- Department executives: George Warwick Smith, Secretary (1972‑73); Allan O'Brien, Secretary (1973‑75)

The Department of the Northern Territory was an Australian government department that existed between December 1972 and June 1975. It was the second so-named Australian government department.

== History ==
The department was one of several new Departments established by the Whitlam government, a wide restructuring that revealed some of the new government's program. The creation of the department, with a Darwin-based Secretary, was seen by many as an effort to undermine the role of the Northern Territory Administrator.

== Scope ==
Information about the department's functions and government funding allocation could be found in the Administrative Arrangements Orders, the annual Portfolio Budget Statements and in the department's annual reports.

The department was responsible for the administration of the Northern Territory of Australia and the Territory of Ashmore and Cartier Islands. The principal matters dealt with by the department at its creation were:

- Urban development and town planning
- Transport planning; and
- Local government, community services and housing
- Forest, fisheries, wildlife, and National Parks
- Animal industry and agriculture
- Mines
- Water resources

== Structure ==
The department was a Commonwealth Public Service department, staffed by officials who were responsible to the Minister for the Northern Territory. When the department was established, George Warwick Smith was named Secretary. After less than a month, he was replaced by Allan O'Brien.
