= Electoral results for the Division of New England =

Australian division election results

This is a list of electoral results for the Division of New England in Australian federal elections from the division's creation in 1901 until the present.

== Members ==
Member	Party	Term
William Sawers	Protectionist	1901–1903
Edmund Lonsdale	Free Trade	1903–1906
Frank Foster	Labor	1906–1913
Percy Abbott	Liberal	1913–1916
Percy Abbott	Nationalist	1916–1919
Alexander Hay	Nationalist	1919–1920
Alexander Hay	Country	1920–1922
Alexander Hay	Independent	1922–1922
Victor Thompson	Country	1922–1940
Joe Abbott	Country	1940–1949
David Drummond	Country	1949–1963
Ian Sinclair	Country, National	1963–1998
Stuart St. Clair	National	1998–2001
Tony Windsor	Independent	2001–2013
Barnaby Joyce	National	2013–2025
Barnaby Joyce	Independent	2025
Barnaby Joyce	One Nation	2025-present

== Election results ==
=== Elections in the 2020s ===
==== 2025 ====
2025 Australian federal election: New England
Party	Candidate	Votes	%	±%
National	Barnaby Joyce	59,711	52.22	+1.44
Labor	Laura Hughes	23,233	20.32	+0.37
One Nation	Brent Larkham	11,387	9.96	+4.70
Greens	Wendy Wales	9,023	7.89	+0.38
Independent	Natasha Ledger	4,240	3.71	+1.21
Family First	Holly Masters	3,646	3.19	+3.19
Trumpet of Patriots	Todd Juchau	3,106	2.72	+2.72
Total formal votes		114,346	95.16	+1.64
Informal votes		5,816	4.84	−1.64
Turnout		120,162	91.56	+1.85
Two-party-preferred result
National	Barnaby Joyce	76,680	67.06	+1.85
Labor	Laura Hughes	37,666	32.94	−1.85
National hold		Swing	+1.85	

==== 2022 ====
2022 Australian federal election: New England
Party	Candidate	Votes	%	±%
National	Barnaby Joyce	51,036	52.47	−2.35
Labor	Laura Hughes	18,056	18.56	+5.81
Independent	Matt Sharpham	7,659	7.87	+7.87
Greens	Carol Sparks	7,524	7.74	+3.31
One Nation	Richard Thomas	4,570	4.70	+4.70
Liberal Democrats	Pavlo Samios	3,174	3.26	+3.26
Independent	Natasha Ledger	2,708	2.78	−0.38
United Australia	Cindy Duncan	2,545	2.62	−1.96
Total formal votes		97,272	93.74	+0.56
Informal votes		6,494	6.26	−0.56
Turnout		103,766	91.58	−1.76
Two-party-preferred result
National	Barnaby Joyce	64,622	66.43	−1.20
Labor	Laura Hughes	32,650	33.57	+1.20
National hold		Swing	−1.20	

Alluvial diagram for preference flows in the seat of New England in the 2022 federal election. The winning candidate got over 50% of first preference votes, so this alluvial diagram is indicative only, and preference flows were not used to determine the final result. The preference flows were used to determine the two-candidate-preferred.

=== Elections in the 2010s ===
==== 2019 ====
2019 Australian federal election: New England
Party	Candidate	Votes	%	±%
National	Barnaby Joyce	53,348	54.82	+2.53
Independent	Adam Blakester	13,804	14.18	+14.18
Labor	Yvonne Langenberg	12,410	12.75	+5.74
United Australia	Cindy Duncan	4,459	4.58	+4.58
Greens	Tony Lonergan	4,311	4.43	+1.51
Independent	Rob Taber	3,702	3.80	+1.00
Independent	Natasha Ledger	3,071	3.16	+3.16
Christian Democrats	Julie Collins	2,215	2.28	+0.89
Total formal votes		97,320	93.18	+0.22
Informal votes		7,120	6.82	−0.22
Turnout		104,440	93.34	−0.03
Notional two-party-preferred count
National	Barnaby Joyce	65,818	67.63	+1.21
Labor	Yvonne Langenberg	31,502	32.37	−1.21
Two-candidate-preferred result
National	Barnaby Joyce	62,637	64.36	−9.27
Independent	Adam Blakester	34,683	35.64	+35.64
National hold		Swing	N/A	

==== 2017 ====
2017 New England by-election
Party	Candidate	Votes	%	±%
National	Barnaby Joyce	57,016	64.92	+12.63
Labor	David Ewings	9,764	11.12	+4.11
Independent	Rob Taber	5,959	6.79	+3.99
Greens	Peter Wills	3,824	4.35	+1.43
Christian Democrats	Richard Stretton	2,129	2.42	+1.03
CountryMinded	Pete Mailler	2,112	2.40	+0.99
Science	Meow-Ludo Meow-Meow	1,183	1.35	+1.35
Independent	Jeff Madden	1,145	1.30	+1.30
Animal Justice	Skyla Wagstaff	930	1.06	+1.06
Sustainable Australia	William Bourke	628	0.72	+0.72
Affordable Housing	Andrew Potts	605	0.69	+0.69
Independent	Dean Carter	590	0.67	+0.67
Liberal Democrats	Tristam Smyth	515	0.59	−0.62
Country	Ian Britza	494	0.56	+0.56
Rise Up Australia	Donald Cranney	365	0.42	+0.42
Seniors United	Warwick Stacey	342	0.39	+0.39
21st Century	Jamie McIntyre	222	0.25	+0.25
Total formal votes		87,823	91.06	−1.90
Informal votes		8,618	8.94	+1.90
Turnout		96,441	87.13	−6.14
Two-party-preferred result
National	Barnaby Joyce	64,664	73.63	+7.21
Labor	David Ewings	23,159	26.37	−7.21
National hold		Swing	+7.21	

==== 2016 ====
2016 Australian federal election: New England
Party	Candidate	Votes	%	±%
National	Barnaby Joyce	49,673	52.29	−1.42
Independent	Tony Windsor	27,763	29.22	+29.22
Labor	David Ewings	6,662	7.01	−6.79
Greens	Mercurius Goldstein	2,775	2.92	−1.85
Independent	Rob Taber	2,661	2.80	−9.77
CountryMinded	David Mailler	1,337	1.41	+1.41
Christian Democrats	Stan Colefax	1,317	1.39	−0.27
Liberal Democrats	Peter Whelan	1,151	1.21	+1.21
Independent	Philip Cox	856	0.90	+0.90
Online Direct Democracy	Robert Walker	809	0.85	+0.85
Total formal votes		95,004	92.96	−1.03
Informal votes		7,196	7.04	+1.03
Turnout		102,200	93.37	−3.12
Notional two-party-preferred count
National	Barnaby Joyce	63,100	66.42	−3.12
Labor	David Ewings	31,904	33.58	+3.12
Two-candidate-preferred result
National	Barnaby Joyce	55,595	58.52	−5.94
Independent	Tony Windsor	39,409	41.48	+41.48
National hold		Swing	N/A	

==== 2013 ====
2013 Australian federal election: New England
Party	Candidate	Votes	%	±%
National	Barnaby Joyce	49,486	54.21	+28.99
Independent	Rob Taber	12,574	13.77	+13.77
Labor	Stephen Hewitt	10,825	11.86	+3.73
Independent	Jamie McIntyre	6,059	6.64	+6.64
Palmer United	Phillip Girle	4,746	5.20	+5.20
Greens	Pat Schultz	4,184	4.58	+1.01
One Nation	Brian Dettmann	1,566	1.72	+0.85
Christian Democrats	Aaron Evans	1,496	1.64	+1.64
Citizens Electoral Council	Richard Witten	353	0.39	+0.05
Total formal votes		91,289	93.95	−2.51
Informal votes		5,881	6.05	+2.51
Turnout		97,170	95.14	+0.26
Notional two-party-preferred count
National	Barnaby Joyce	64,551	70.71	+3.91
Labor	Stephen Hewitt	26,738	29.29	−3.91
Two-candidate-preferred result
National	Barnaby Joyce	58,846	64.46	+35.98
Independent	Rob Taber	32,443	35.54	+35.54
National gain from Independent		Swing	N/A	

The sitting member was Tony Windsor (Independent) who did not contest the election.

==== 2010 ====
2010 Australian federal election: New England
Party	Candidate	Votes	%	±%
Independent	Tony Windsor	56,415	61.88	+5.13
National	Tim Coates	22,991	25.22	−0.32
Labor	Greg Smith	7,414	8.13	−2.77
Greens	Pat Schultz	3,252	3.57	+0.26
One Nation	Brian Dettmann	794	0.87	−0.29
Citizens Electoral Council	Richard Witten	306	0.34	+0.08
Total formal votes		91,172	96.46	−0.57
Informal votes		3,347	3.54	+0.57
Turnout		94,519	94.83	−1.27
Notional two-party-preferred count
National	Tim Coates	60,907	66.8	+1.96
Labor	Greg Smith	30,265	33.2	−1.96
Two-candidate-preferred result
Independent	Tony Windsor	65,203	71.52	−2.89
National	Tim Coates	25,969	28.48	+2.89
Independent hold		Swing	−2.89	

=== Elections in the 2000s ===
==== 2007 ====
2007 Australian federal election: New England
Party	Candidate	Votes	%	±%
Independent	Tony Windsor	52,734	61.94	+7.24
National	Phil Betts	19,850	23.31	+2.54
Labor	Luke Brand	8,368	9.83	+0.65
Greens	Bruce Taylor	2,892	3.40	+0.06
One Nation	Brian Dettmann	1,071	1.26	−0.28
Citizens Electoral Council	Richard Witten	225	0.26	−0.32
Total formal votes		85,140	97.12	−0.09
Informal votes		2,522	2.88	+0.09
Turnout		87,662	95.92	−0.52
Notional two-party-preferred count
National	Phil Betts	55,167	64.8	+1.21
Labor	Luke Brand	29,973	35.2	−1.21
Two-candidate-preferred result
Independent	Tony Windsor	63,286	74.33	+2.95
National	Phil Betts	21,854	25.67	−2.95
Independent hold		Swing	+2.95	

==== 2004 ====
2004 Australian federal election: New England
Party	Candidate	Votes	%	±%
Independent	Tony Windsor	46,072	57.27	+12.23
National	Trevor Khan	15,031	18.69	−20.21
Liberal	Scot MacDonald	8,070	10.03	+10.03
Labor	Greg Smith	6,988	8.69	−1.26
Greens	Bruce Taylor	2,679	3.33	+1.07
One Nation	Raymond Scholes	1,146	1.42	−1.34
Citizens Electoral Council	Steve Lawler	455	0.57	+0.57
Total formal votes		80,441	97.23	−0.80
Informal votes		2,291	2.77	+0.80
Turnout		82,732	95.40	−0.56
Notional two-party-preferred count
National	Trevor Khan	50,847	63.21	−0.64
Labor	Greg Smith	29,594	36.79	+0.64
Two-candidate-preferred result
Independent	Tony Windsor	57,115	71.00	+12.70
National	Trevor Khan	23,326	29.00	−12.70
Independent hold		Swing	+12.70	

==== 2001 ====
2001 Australian federal election: New England
Party	Candidate	Votes	%	±%
Independent	Tony Windsor	35,992	45.04	+45.04
National	Stuart St. Clair	31,079	38.90	+6.40
Labor	Annette McCarthy	7,947	9.95	−13.58
One Nation	Kayleen Bounds	2,202	2.76	−11.78
Greens	Michelle Reiner	1,807	2.26	+0.34
Democrats	Chris Reardon	876	1.10	−1.10
Total formal votes		79,903	98.03	+1.68
Informal votes		1,608	1.97	−1.68
Turnout		81,511	96.98	
Notional two-party-preferred count
National	Stuart St. Clair	51,017	63.85	+0.2
Labor	Annette McCarthy	28,886	36.15	−0.2
Two-candidate-preferred result
Independent	Tony Windsor	46,580	58.30	+58.30
National	Stuart St. Clair	33,323	41.70	−21.23
Independent gain from National		Swing	+58.30	

=== Elections in the 1990s ===
==== 1998 ====
1998 Australian federal election: New England
Party	Candidate	Votes	%	±%
National	Stuart St. Clair	21,299	31.11	−29.39
Labor	Pat Dixon	15,733	22.98	−1.88
Liberal	Peter Monley	11,261	16.45	+16.45
One Nation	Victor Weare	9,288	13.57	+13.57
Independent	Graham Nuttall	6,202	9.06	+9.06
Democrats	Rebekah Grindlay	1,466	2.14	−6.71
Greens	James Cronin	1,460	2.13	+2.13
Christian Democrats	Oriel Pearce	1,143	1.67	+1.67
Independent	David Morton	449	0.66	+0.66
Natural Law	Frances Letters	162	0.24	−0.82
Total formal votes		68,463	96.38	−1.33
Informal votes		2,573	3.62	+1.33
Turnout		71,036	95.18	−0.91
Two-party-preferred result
National	Stuart St. Clair	43,086	62.93	−6.25
Labor	Pat Dixon	25,377	37.07	+6.25
National hold		Swing	−6.25	

==== 1996 ====
1996 Australian federal election: New England
Party	Candidate	Votes	%	±%
National	Ian Sinclair	42,539	60.50	+7.80
Labor	Herman Beyersdorf	17,477	24.86	−9.35
Democrats	Allan Caswell	6,221	8.85	+8.85
Independent	Terry Larsen	3,333	4.74	+4.74
Natural Law	Frances Letters	743	1.06	+1.06
Total formal votes		70,313	97.71	−0.17
Informal votes		1,649	2.29	+0.17
Turnout		71,962	96.08	−0.54
Two-party-preferred result
National	Ian Sinclair	48,381	69.18	+8.98
Labor	Herman Beyersdorf	21,551	30.82	−8.98
National hold		Swing	+8.98	

==== 1993 ====
1993 Australian federal election: New England
Party	Candidate	Votes	%	±%
National	Ian Sinclair	37,386	52.70	+3.05
Labor	Chris Watt	24,268	34.21	−0.74
Independent	Warren Woodgate	7,717	10.88	+10.88
Independent	Glen Hausfield	1,570	2.21	+2.21
Total formal votes		70,941	97.88	+0.10
Informal votes		1,538	2.12	−0.10
Turnout		72,479	96.63	
Two-party-preferred result
National	Ian Sinclair	42,693	60.20	+3.92
Labor	Chris Watt	28,226	39.80	−3.92
National hold		Swing	+3.92	

==== 1990 ====
1990 Australian federal election: New England
Party	Candidate	Votes	%	±%
National	Ian Sinclair	34,292	49.7	−0.4
Labor	Paul Brock	24,082	34.9	−2.6
Democrats	Steve Wood	7,225	10.5	+5.7
Independent	Guy Wernhard	1,993	2.9	+2.9
Independent	Peter Worthing	1,385	2.0	+2.0
Total formal votes		68,977	97.8	
Informal votes		1,562	2.2	
Turnout		70,539	95.8	
Two-party-preferred result
National	Ian Sinclair	38,735	56.3	−2.1
Labor	Paul Brock	30,085	43.7	+2.1
National hold		Swing	−2.1	

=== Elections in the 1980s ===
==== 1987 ====
1987 Australian federal election: New England
Party	Candidate	Votes	%	±%
National	Ian Sinclair	33,306	50.1	−1.2
Labor	Joe Horan	24,938	37.5	−4.6
Independent	Bevan O'Regan	4,412	6.6	+6.6
Democrats	Eunice Moody	3,190	4.8	−1.8
Independent	Lance Baldwin	632	1.0	+1.0
Total formal votes		66,478	97.2	
Informal votes		1,890	2.8	
Turnout		68,368	94.2	
Two-party-preferred result
National	Ian Sinclair	38,800	58.4	+3.8
Labor	Joe Horan	27,669	41.6	−3.8
National hold		Swing	+3.8	

==== 1984 ====
1984 Australian federal election: New England
Party	Candidate	Votes	%	±%
National	Ian Sinclair	33,356	51.3	+1.3
Labor	Joe Horan	27,413	42.1	−2.2
Democrats	Rod Irvine	4,287	6.6	+0.9
Total formal votes		65,056	96.8	
Informal votes		2,170	3.2	
Turnout		67,226	95.5	
Two-party-preferred result
National	Ian Sinclair	35,494	54.6	+1.7
Labor	Joe Horan	29,562	45.4	−1.7
National hold		Swing	+1.7	

==== 1983 ====
1983 Australian federal election: New England
Party	Candidate	Votes	%	±%
National	Ian Sinclair	33,335	49.8	−2.9
Labor	Lawrence Daly	29,812	44.5	+6.6
Democrats	Ian Dutton	3,814	5.7	−3.7
Total formal votes		66,961	98.9	
Informal votes		774	1.1	
Turnout		67,735	95.5	
Two-party-preferred result
National	Ian Sinclair	35,276	52.7	−3.8
Labor	Lawrence Daly	31,685	47.3	+3.8
National hold		Swing	−3.8	

==== 1980 ====
1980 Australian federal election: New England
Party	Candidate	Votes	%	±%
National Country	Ian Sinclair	34,454	52.7	−6.6
Labor	Selby Dean	24,808	37.9	+6.5
Democrats	Fiona Richardson	6,124	9.4	+0.1
Total formal votes		65,386	98.4	
Informal votes		1,050	1.6	
Turnout		66,436	95.2	
Two-party-preferred result
National Country	Ian Sinclair		56.5	−7.5
Labor	Selby Dean		43.5	+7.5
National Country hold		Swing	−7.5	

=== Elections in the 1970s ===
==== 1977 ====
1977 Australian federal election: New England
Party	Candidate	Votes	%	±%
National Country	Ian Sinclair	37,601	59.3	−4.1
Labor	Selby Dean	19,941	31.4	−1.2
Democrats	Bradley Mulligan	5,919	9.3	+9.3
Total formal votes		63,461	98.5	
Informal votes		979	1.5	
Turnout		64,440	95.4	
Two-party-preferred result
National Country	Ian Sinclair		64.0	−0.9
Labor	Selby Dean		36.0	+0.9
National Country hold		Swing	−0.9	

==== 1975 ====
1975 Australian federal election: New England
Party	Candidate	Votes	%	±%
National Country	Ian Sinclair	36,971	62.3	+5.3
Labor	John Shanahan	19,980	33.7	−6.5
Independent	Geoffrey Anderson	2,395	4.0	+4.0
Total formal votes		59,346	98.5	
Informal votes		881	1.5	
Turnout		60,227	95.1	
Two-party-preferred result
National Country	Ian Sinclair		63.8	+5.7
Labor	John Shanahan		36.2	−5.7
National Country hold		Swing	+5.7	

==== 1974 ====
1974 Australian federal election: New England
Party	Candidate	Votes	%	±%
Country	Ian Sinclair	32,874	57.0	+7.8
Labor	William Bischoff	23,197	40.2	−0.1
Australia	Brian Edwards	1,574	2.7	−3.3
Total formal votes		57,645	98.8	
Informal votes		672	1.2	
Turnout		58,317	95.6	
Two-party-preferred result
Country	Ian Sinclair		58.1	+3.2
Labor	William Bischoff		41.9	−3.2
Country hold		Swing	+3.2	

==== 1972 ====
1972 Australian federal election: New England
Party	Candidate	Votes	%	±%
Country	Ian Sinclair	25,158	49.2	−9.9
Labor	Justin Rowe	20,577	40.3	−0.6
Australia	Brian Edwards	3,084	6.0	+6.0
Democratic Labor	Edwin Taber	2,284	4.5	+4.5
Total formal votes		51,103	99.0	
Informal votes		530	1.0	
Turnout		51,633	96.0	
Two-party-preferred result
Country	Ian Sinclair		54.9	−4.2
Labor	Justin Rowe		45.1	+4.2
Country hold		Swing	−4.2	

=== Elections in the 1960s ===
==== 1969 ====
1969 Australian federal election: New England
Party	Candidate	Votes	%	±%
Country	Ian Sinclair	28,421	59.1	−7.6
Labor	Alan Kitson	19,707	40.9	+7.6
Total formal votes		48,128	98.8	
Informal votes		575	1.2	
Turnout		48,703	95.9	
Country hold		Swing	−7.6	

==== 1966 ====
1966 Australian federal election: New England
Party	Candidate	Votes	%	±%
Country	Ian Sinclair	28,245	69.3	+14.6
Labor	John Affleck	12,529	30.7	−11.4
Total formal votes		40,774	97.8	
Informal votes		904	2.2	
Turnout		41,678	95.7	
Country hold		Swing	+12.0	

==== 1963 ====
1963 Australian federal election: New England
Party	Candidate	Votes	%	±%
Country	Ian Sinclair	22,027	54.7	+0.9
Labor	Donald White	16,930	42.1	+1.4
Independent	James Gordon	959	2.4	+2.4
Independent	Andrew Monley	331	0.8	+0.8
Total formal votes		40,247	98.7	
Informal votes		514	1.3	
Turnout		40,761	95.8	
Two-party-preferred result
Country	Ian Sinclair		57.3	−1.1
Labor	Donald White		42.7	+1.1
Country hold		Swing	−1.1	

==== 1961 ====
1961 Australian federal election: New England
Party	Candidate	Votes	%	±%
Country	David Drummond	21,086	53.8	−5.8
Labor	Donald White	15,929	40.7	+8.9
Democratic Labor	John Burless	2,143	5.5	−3.1
Total formal votes		39,158	98.2	
Informal votes		700	1.8	
Turnout		39,858	95.6	
Two-party-preferred result
Country	David Drummond		58.4	−8.3
Labor	Donald White		41.6	+8.3
Country hold		Swing	−8.3	

=== Elections in the 1950s ===
==== 1958 ====
1958 Australian federal election: New England
Party	Candidate	Votes	%	±%
Country	David Drummond	23,425	59.6	−0.8
Labor	Donald White	12,473	31.8	−7.8
Democratic Labor	John Burless	3,385	8.6	+8.6
Total formal votes		39,283	97.8	
Informal votes		885	2.2	
Turnout		40,168	95.5	
Two-party-preferred result
Country	David Drummond		66.7	+6.3
Labor	Donald White		33.3	−6.3
Country hold		Swing	+6.3	

==== 1955 ====
1955 Australian federal election: New England
Party	Candidate	Votes	%	±%
Country	David Drummond	23,666	60.4	+2.1
Labor	Frederick Cowley	15,511	39.6	−2.1
Total formal votes		39,177	98.1	
Informal votes		777	1.9	
Turnout		39,954	96.0	
Country hold		Swing	+2.1	

==== 1954 ====
1954 Australian federal election: New England
Party	Candidate	Votes	%	±%
Country	David Drummond	21,852	57.1	−0.8
Labor	Frederick Cowley	16,444	42.9	+0.8
Total formal votes		38,296	99.1	
Informal votes		356	0.9	
Turnout		38,652	96.4	
Country hold		Swing	−0.8	

==== 1951 ====
1951 Australian federal election: New England
Party	Candidate	Votes	%	±%
Country	David Drummond	21,259	57.9	−5.1
Labor	William Wilson	15,462	42.1	+5.1
Total formal votes		36,721	98.7	
Informal votes		491	1.3	
Turnout		37,212	96.7	
Country hold		Swing	−3.3	

=== Elections in the 1940s ===
==== 1949 ====
1949 Australian federal election: New England
Party	Candidate	Votes	%	±%
Country	David Drummond	16,159	44.3	−16.0
Labor	William Wilson	13,515	37.0	−4.7
Country	Donald Shand	6,830	18.7	+18.7
Total formal votes		36,504	98.8	
Informal votes		427	1.2	
Turnout		36,931	96.2	
Two-party-preferred result
Country	David Drummond	22,417	61.4	+2.9
Labor	William Wilson	14,087	38.6	−2.9
Country hold		Swing	+2.9	

==== 1946 ====
1946 Australian federal election: New England
Party	Candidate	Votes	%	±%
Country	Joe Abbott	29,664	60.6	+15.2
Labor	Leigh Cuthbertson	19,310	39.4	−7.5
Total formal votes		48,974	98.2	
Informal votes		880	1.8	
Turnout		49,854	93.9	
Country hold		Swing	+9.5	

==== 1943 ====
1943 Australian federal election: New England
Party	Candidate	Votes	%	±%
Labor	Herbert Oxford	22,342	46.9	+13.8
Country	Joe Abbott	21,636	45.4	−21.5
Independent	Charles Abbott	2,507	5.3	+5.3
One Parliament	James Fowler	680	1.4	+1.4
Independent	Albert Royal	468	1.0	+1.0
Total formal votes		47,633	96.8	
Informal votes		1,552	3.2	
Turnout		49,185	95.5	
Two-party-preferred result
Country	Joe Abbott	24,337	51.1	−9.5
Labor	Herbert Oxford	23,296	48.9	+9.5
Country hold		Swing	−9.5	

==== 1940 ====
1940 Australian federal election: New England
Party	Candidate	Votes	%	±%
Country	Joe Abbott	16,898	34.8	+34.8
Labor	Leigh Cuthbertson	16,085	33.1	−5.9
Country	Victor Thompson	11,635	24.0	−37.0
Country	Donald Shand	3,938	8.1	+8.1
Total formal votes		48,556	98.0	
Informal votes		966	2.0	
Turnout		49,522	95.0	
Two-party-preferred result
Country	Joe Abbott	29,440	60.6	−0.4
Labor	Leigh Cuthbertson	19,116	39.4	+0.4
Country hold		Swing	−0.4	

=== Elections in the 1930s ===
==== 1937 ====
1937 Australian federal election: New England
Party	Candidate	Votes	%	±%
Country	Victor Thompson	29,994	61.0	+16.9
Labor	Leigh Cuthbertson	19,196	39.0	+39.0
Total formal votes		49,190	97.7	
Informal votes		1,141	2.3	
Turnout		50,331	96.4	
Country hold		Swing	−0.7	

==== 1934 ====
1934 Australian federal election: New England
Party	Candidate	Votes	%	±%
Country	Victor Thompson	21,325	44.1	−9.6
Labor (NSW)	John O'Connor	14,836	30.7	+27.1
United Australia	Patrick Cantwell	12,210	25.2	+11.5
Total formal votes		48,371	97.6	
Informal votes		1,179	2.4	
Turnout		49,550	95.8	
Two-party-preferred result
Country	Victor Thompson	29,862	61.7	−4.9
Labor (NSW)	John O'Connor	18,509	38.3	+38.3
Country hold		Swing	−4.9	

==== 1931 ====
1931 Australian federal election: New England
Party	Candidate	Votes	%	±%
Country	Victor Thompson	26,555	66.6	+12.0
Independent	Angus Campbell	13,295	33.4	+33.4
Total formal votes		39,850	95.4	
Informal votes		1,913	4.6	
Turnout		41,763	94.6	
Country hold		Swing	+12.0	

=== Elections in the 1920s ===
==== 1929 ====
1929 Australian federal election: New England
Party	Candidate	Votes	%	±%
Country	Victor Thompson	21,005	54.6	−45.4
Labor	Thomas Wilson	17,489	45.4	+45.4
Total formal votes		38,494	97.3	
Informal votes		1,063	2.7	
Turnout		39,557	93.6	
Country hold		Swing	−45.4	

==== 1928 ====
1928 Australian federal election: New England
Party	Candidate	Votes	%	±%
Country	Victor Thompson	unopposed		
Country hold		Swing		

==== 1925 ====
1925 Australian federal election: New England
Party	Candidate	Votes	%	±%
Country	Victor Thompson	20,896	58.5	+22.9
Labor	John Heiss	14,824	41.5	+6.1
Total formal votes		35,720	97.3	
Informal votes		987	2.7	
Turnout		36,707	89.1	
Country hold		Swing	+0.0	

==== 1922 ====
1922 Australian federal election: New England
Party	Candidate	Votes	%	±%
Country	Victor Thompson	7,726	35.6	+35.6
Labor	Sydney Kearney	7,683	35.4	−6.9
Independent	Alexander Hay	6,282	29.0	+29.0
Total formal votes		21,691	95.7	
Informal votes		985	4.3	
Turnout		22,676	57.7	
Two-party-preferred result
Country	Victor Thompson	12,695	58.5	+58.5
Labor	Sydney Kearney	8,996	41.5	−1.0
Country gain from Nationalist		Swing	+58.5	

=== Elections in the 1910s ===
==== 1919 ====
1919 Australian federal election: New England
Party	Candidate	Votes	%	±%
Nationalist	Alexander Hay	12,622	57.3	−42.7
Labor	James Tully	9,390	42.7	+42.7
Total formal votes		22,012	98.0	
Informal votes		442	2.0	
Turnout		22,454	69.7	
Nationalist hold		Swing	−42.7	

==== 1917 ====
1917 Australian federal election: New England
Party	Candidate	Votes	%	±%
Nationalist	Percy Abbott	unopposed		
Nationalist hold		Swing		

==== 1914 ====
1914 Australian federal election: New England
Party	Candidate	Votes	%	±%
Liberal	Percy Abbott	13,929	56.7	+0.2
Labor	Edward Bowman	10,633	43.3	−0.2
Total formal votes		24,562	97.9	
Informal votes		533	2.1	
Turnout		25,095	73.8	
Liberal hold		Swing	+0.2	

==== 1913 ====
1913 Australian federal election: New England
Party	Candidate	Votes	%	±%
Liberal	Percy Abbott	14,248	56.5	+10.1
Labor	Frank Foster	10,978	43.5	−8.9
Total formal votes		25,226	98.1	
Informal votes		500	1.9	
Turnout		25,726	72.4	
Liberal gain from Labor		Swing	+9.5	

==== 1910 ====
1910 Australian federal election: New England
Party	Candidate	Votes	%	±%
Labour	Frank Foster	9,622	52.7	+0.9
Liberal	William Fleming	8,637	47.3	−0.9
Total formal votes		18,259	96.8	
Informal votes		407	2.2	
Turnout		18,666	61.2	
Labour hold		Swing	+0.9	

=== Elections in the 1900s ===
==== 1906 ====
1906 Australian federal election: New England
Party	Candidate	Votes	%	±%
Labour	Frank Foster	7,631	51.8	+51.8
Anti-Socialist	Edmund Lonsdale	7,099	48.2	−3.7
Total formal votes		14,730	96.5	
Informal votes		538	3.5	
Turnout		15,268	54.6	
Labour gain from Anti-Socialist		Swing	+51.8	

==== 1903 ====
1903 Australian federal election: New England
Party	Candidate	Votes	%	±%
Free Trade	Edmund Lonsdale	6,921	51.9	+7.3
Protectionist	William Sawers	6,423	48.1	+2.3
Total formal votes		13,344	96.9	
Informal votes		420	3.1	
Turnout		13,764	51.4	
Free Trade gain from Protectionist		Swing	+2.5	

==== 1901 ====
1901 Australian federal election: New England
Party	Candidate	Votes	%	±%
Protectionist	William Sawers	4,063	45.8	+45.8
Free Trade	Edmund Lonsdale	3,955	44.6	+44.6
Independent	George Simpson	845	9.5	+9.5
Total formal votes		8,863	98.1	
Informal votes		172	1.9	
Turnout		9,035	67.3	
Protectionist win		(new seat)		
