= Electoral results for the district of Bingara =

Election results for Bingara, New South Wales, Australia

Bingara, an electoral district of the Legislative Assembly in the Australian state of New South Wales was created in 1894 and abolished in 1920.

Election	Member	Party affiliation
1894	Samuel Moore	Free Trade
1895	Samuel Moore	Free Trade
1898	Samuel Moore	Free Trade
1901	Samuel Moore	Liberal Reform
1904	Samuel Moore	Liberal Reform
1904 by	Samuel Moore	Liberal Reform
1907	Samuel Moore	Liberal Reform
1910	George McDonald	Labor
1913	George McDonald	Labor
1916 by	George McDonald	Independent
1917	George McDonald	Nationalist

== Election results ==
=== Elections in the 1910s ===
==== 1917 ====
1917 New South Wales state election: Bingara
Party	Candidate	Votes	%	±%
Nationalist	George McDonald	3,113	51.5	+3.7
Labor	Alfred McClelland	2,935	48.5	+0.7
Total formal votes		6,048	98.4	+1.0
Informal votes		95	1.6	−1.0
Turnout		6,143	65.5	−5.0
Member changed to Nationalist from Labor / Independent				

George McDonald had been elected as a Labor member in the 1913 election. He resigned from the party and his seat as a protest at the behaviour of the Easter 1916 NSW Labor conference and retained the seat at the by-election as an Independent.

==== 1916 by-election ====
1916 Bingara by-election Saturday 10 June
Party	Candidate	Votes	%	±%
Independent	George McDonald (re-elected)	2,974	56.2	
Labor	Alfred McClelland	2,314	43.8	
Total formal votes		5,288	99.0	
Informal votes		52	1.0	
Turnout		5,340	52.8 (Note: based on an electoral roll of 10,111 at the 1913 election.)	
Member changed to Independent from Labor				

George McDonald had been elected as a Labor member in the 1913 election. He resigned from the party and his seat as a protest at the behaviour of the Easter 1916 NSW Labor conference and retained the seat at the by-election as an Independent.

==== 1913 ====
1913 New South Wales state election: Bingara
Party	Candidate	Votes	%	±%
Farmers and Settlers	Robert Higgins (Note: Also endorsed by Liberal Reform.)	3,320	47.8	
Labor	George McDonald	3,317	47.8	
Country Party Association	Frank Cheesbrough	310	4.5	
Total formal votes		6,947	97.4	
Informal votes		182	2.6	
Turnout		7,129	70.5	

1913 New South Wales state election: Bingara - Second Round Saturday 20 December
Party	Candidate	Votes	%	±%
Labor	George McDonald	3,773	51.8	
Farmers and Settlers	Robert Higgins	3,514	48.2	
Total formal votes		7,287	99.6	
Informal votes		32	0.4	
Turnout		7,319	72.4	
Labor hold				

==== 1910 ====
1910 New South Wales state election: Bingara
Party	Candidate	Votes	%	±%
Labour	George McDonald	3,037	50.3	+12.3
Liberal Reform	Samuel Moore (defeated)	2,997	49.7	−12.2
Total formal votes		6,034	98.4	+1.5
Informal votes		98	1.6	−1.5
Turnout		6,132	64.2	+4.4
Labour gain from Liberal Reform				

=== Elections in the 1900s ===
==== 1907 ====
1907 New South Wales state election: Bingara
Party	Candidate	Votes	%	±%
Liberal Reform	Samuel Moore	3,143	61.9	
Labour	Samuel Heaton	1,936	38.1	
Total formal votes		5,079	96.9	
Informal votes		161	3.1	
Turnout		5,240	59.8	
Liberal Reform hold				

==== 1904 by-election ====
1904 Bingara by-election Wednesday 14 September
Party	Candidate	Votes	%	±%
Liberal Reform	Samuel Moore (re-elected)	2,261	79.8	
Labour	Frank Foster	572	20.2	
Total formal votes		2,833	100.0	
Informal votes		0	0.0	
Turnout		2,833	73.8 (Note: Estimate based on an electoral roll of 6,471 at the August 1904 election.)	
Liberal Reform hold		Swing	N/A	

Samuel Moore was appointed Secretary for Mines in the Carruthers ministry.

==== 1904 ====
1904 New South Wales state election: Bingara
Party	Candidate	Votes	%	±%
Liberal Reform	Samuel Moore	unopposed		
Liberal Reform hold				

Bingara was expanded to include part of Uralla-Walcha. Samuel Moore (Liberal Reform) was the member for Bingara. The member for the abolished seat of Uralla-Walcha was Michael MacMahon (Progressive) who unsuccessfully contested Armidale.

==== 1901 ====
1901 New South Wales state election: Bingara
Party	Candidate	Votes	%	±%
Liberal Reform	Samuel Moore	unopposed		
Liberal Reform hold				

=== Elections in the 1890s ===
==== 1898 ====
1898 New South Wales colonial election: Bingara
Party	Candidate	Votes	%	±%
Free Trade	Samuel Moore	696	57.6	
National Federal	William McIntyre	513	42.4	
Total formal votes		1,209	99.2	
Informal votes		10	0.8	
Turnout		1,219	51.7	
Free Trade hold				

==== 1895 ====
1895 New South Wales colonial election: Bingara
Party	Candidate	Votes	%	±%
Free Trade	Samuel Moore	740	59.0	
Protectionist	William Dowel	515	41.0	
Total formal votes		1,255	99.5	
Informal votes		7	0.6	
Turnout		1,262	61.3	
Free Trade hold				

==== 1894 ====
1894 New South Wales colonial election: Bingara
Party	Candidate	Votes	%	±%
Free Trade	Samuel Moore	751	50.2	
Protectionist	William Dowel	533	35.6	
Ind. Free Trade	Herbert Clark	111	7.4	
Ind. Free Trade	Robert Buist	96	6.4	
Independent Labour	Thomas Jones	5	0.3	
Total formal votes		1,496	97.0	
Informal votes		47	3.1	
Turnout		1,543	76.4	
Free Trade win		(new seat)		
