= 1916 Bingara state by-election =

Election result for Bingara, New South Wales, Australia

A by-election was held for the New South Wales Legislative Assembly electorate of Bingara on 10 June 1916 because George McDonald (Labor) resigned from the party and his seat as a protest at the behaviour of the Easter 1916 NSW Labor conference and recontested the seat as an Independent.

== Results ==
1916 Bingara by-election Saturday 10 June
Party	Candidate	Votes	%	±%
Independent	George McDonald (re-elected)	2,974	56.2	
Labor	Alfred McClelland	2,314	43.8	
Total formal votes		5,288	99.0	
Informal votes		52	1.0	
Turnout		5,340	52.8 (Note: based on an electoral roll of 10,111 at the 1913 election.)	
Member changed to Independent from Labor				

== See also ==
- Electoral results for the district of Bingara
- List of New South Wales state by-elections
