= Division of New England =

Australian federal electoral division

Coordinates: 30.319°S 151.315°E

New England Australian House of Representatives Division
- Interactive map of electorate boundaries from the 2025 federal election
- Created: 1901
- MP: Barnaby Joyce
- Party: One Nation
- Namesake: New England
- Electors: 131,321 (2025)
- Area: 75,237 km^{2} (29,049.2 sq mi)
- Demographic: Rural
Electorates around New England:
Maranoa (QLD)	Maranoa (Queensland)	Maranoa (QLD)
Parkes	New England	Page; Cowper
Calare	Hunter	Lyne

The Division of New England is an Australian electoral division in the state of New South Wales.

== History ==
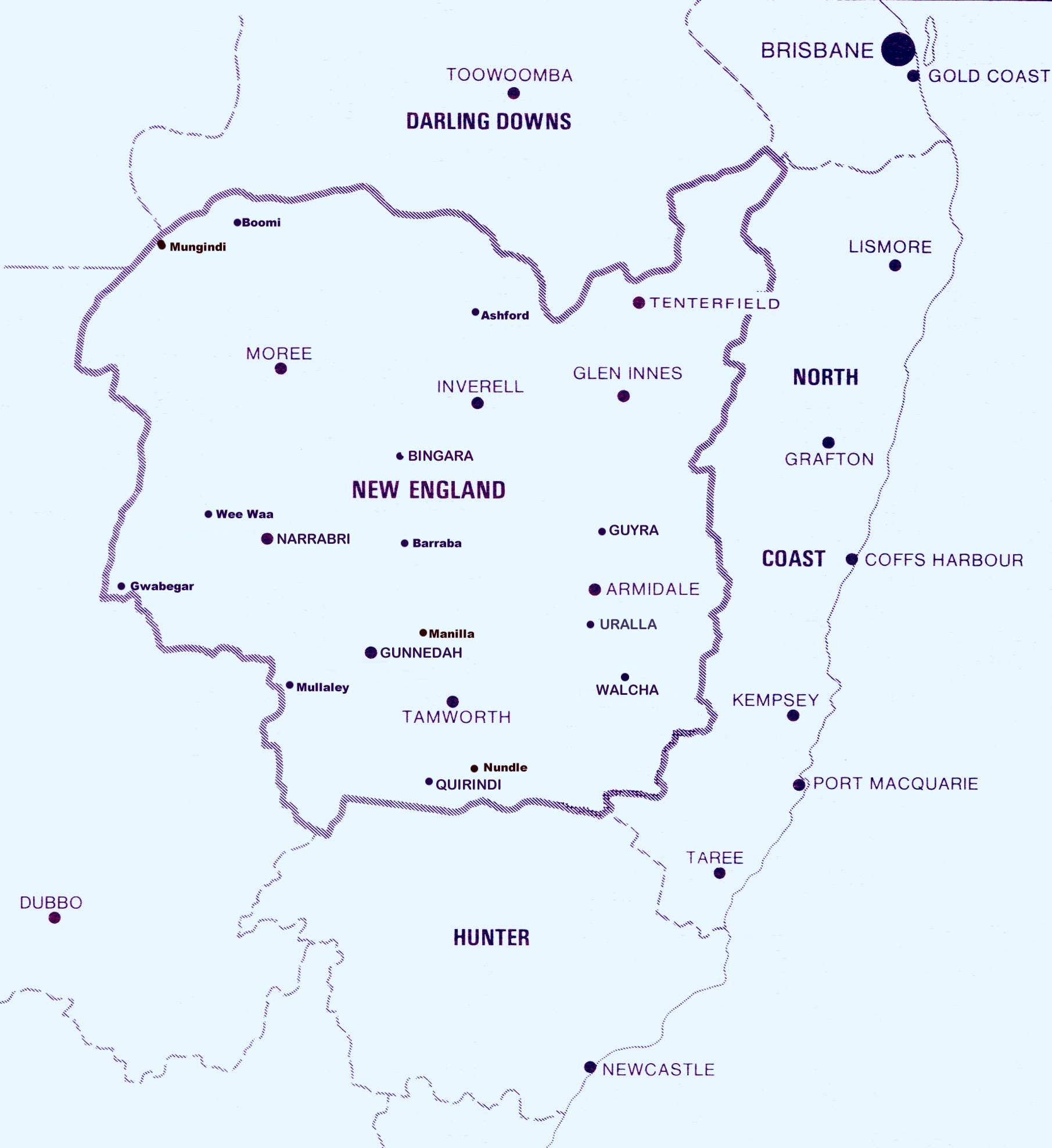
The region of New England, the division's namesake

The division was proclaimed in 1900, and was one of the original 65 divisions to be contested at the first federal election. It is named after the New England region in northern New South Wales.

From 1922 to 2001, New England was usually regarded as a comfortably safe seat for the National Party, formerly the Country Party. Only one Labor candidate has ever won the seat – Frank Foster at the 1906 election and again at the 1910 election, both times on small margins. Since then, the closest Labor has come to winning the seat was in the 1943 landslide, when the Country majority was pared back to an extremely marginal 1.1 percent. It was a marginal seat for most of the 1980s, but since the 1990s Labor has been lucky to get 40 percent of the two-party vote, and has frequently been pushed into third place.

The seat's best-known member was Ian Sinclair, leader of the National Party from 1984 to 1989, a minister in the Menzies, Holt, McEwen, Gorton, McMahon and Fraser governments and Speaker of the Australian House of Representatives for a few months in 1998. He was succeeded by Stuart St. Clair in the 1998 election.

St. Clair was then defeated in the 2001 by independent Tony Windsor, who held it until his retirement in 2013.

The member since the 2013 federal election has been former Queensland Senator Barnaby Joyce, who served as Deputy Prime Minister of Australia and leader of the National Party from 2016 to 2018. Amid the 2017–18 Australian parliamentary eligibility crisis, the seat was declared vacant on 27 October 2017 by the High Court of Australia arising from Joyce's dual citizenship. Joyce had renounced his dual citizenship effective from August to become a sole citizen of Australia and was thus eligible to run for federal parliament. Joyce regained the seat at a by-election on 2 December.

On 18 October 2025, Joyce announced he would not recontest the seat at the next federal election. On 27 November Joyce announced that he would leave the Nationals, and sit on the crossbench as an independent. He subsequently joined One Nation on 8 December 2025.

== Boundaries ==
Since 1984, federal electoral division boundaries in Australia have been determined at redistributions by a redistribution committee appointed by the Australian Electoral Commission. Redistributions occur for the boundaries of divisions in a particular state, and they occur every seven years, or sooner if a state's representation entitlement changes or when divisions of a state are malapportioned.

The division is located in the north-east of New South Wales, adjoining the border with Queensland. The 66,394 km^{2} division covers a largely rural area, with agriculture the main industry. From south to north it includes the regional population centres of Scone, Tamworth, Armidale, Glen Innes, Muswellbrook, Inverell and Tenterfield.

Under the original redistribution proposal in 2015, the Australian Electoral Commission announced it intended to abolish Hunter. Electors in the north of Hunter would have joined New England. Ultimately however, the Commission opted for a less radical proposal that saw Charlton abolished, Hunter pushed eastward to absorb most of Charlton's territory, and New England absorbing a few small areas in Hunter's north. Due to changing populations, overall New South Wales lost a seat while Western Australia gained a seat.

== Members ==
Image	Member	Party	Term	Notes
	William Sawers (1844–1916)	Protectionist	29 March 1901 – 16 December 1903	Previously held the New South Wales Legislative Assembly seat of Tamworth. Lost seat
	Edmund Lonsdale (1843–1913)	Free Trade	16 December 1903 – 1906	Previously held the New South Wales Legislative Assembly seat of Armidale. Lost seat. Later elected to the New South Wales Legislative Assembly seat of Armidale in 1907
	Edmund Lonsdale (1843–1913)	Anti-Socialist	1906 – 12 December 1906	Previously held the New South Wales Legislative Assembly seat of Armidale. Lost seat. Later elected to the New South Wales Legislative Assembly seat of Armidale in 1907
	Frank Foster (1872–1948)	Labor	12 December 1906 – 31 May 1913	Lost seat
	Percy Abbott (1869–1940)	Liberal	31 May 1913 – 17 February 1917	Retired. Later elected to the Senate in 1925
	Percy Abbott (1869–1940)	Nationalist	17 February 1917 – 3 November 1919	Retired. Later elected to the Senate in 1925
	Alexander Hay (1865–1941)	Nationalist	13 December 1919 – 22 January 1920	Lost seat
	Alexander Hay (1865–1941)	Country	22 January 1920 – 19 October 1921	Lost seat
	Alexander Hay (1865–1941)	Independent	19 October 1921 – 16 December 1922	Lost seat
	Victor Thompson (1885–1968)	Country	16 December 1922 – 21 September 1940	Served as minister under Lyons and Page. Lost seat
	Joe Abbott (1891–1965)	Country	21 September 1940 – 31 October 1949	Served as minister under Menzies and Fadden. Retired
	David Drummond (1890–1965)	Country	10 December 1949 – 1 November 1963	Previously held the New South Wales Legislative Assembly seat of Armidale. Retired
	Ian Sinclair (1929–)	Country	30 November 1963 – 2 May 1975	Previously a member of the New South Wales Legislative Council. Served as minister under Menzies, Holt, McEwen, Gorton, McMahon and Fraser. Served as leader of the National Party from 1984 to 1989. Served as Speaker during the Howard Government. Retired
	Ian Sinclair (1929–)	National Country	2 May 1975 – 16 October 1982	Previously a member of the New South Wales Legislative Council. Served as minister under Menzies, Holt, McEwen, Gorton, McMahon and Fraser. Served as leader of the National Party from 1984 to 1989. Served as Speaker during the Howard Government. Retired
	Ian Sinclair (1929–)	Nationals	16 October 1982 – 31 August 1998	Previously a member of the New South Wales Legislative Council. Served as minister under Menzies, Holt, McEwen, Gorton, McMahon and Fraser. Served as leader of the National Party from 1984 to 1989. Served as Speaker during the Howard Government. Retired
	Stuart St. Clair (1949–)	Nationals	3 October 1998 – 10 November 2001	Lost seat
	Tony Windsor (1950–)	Independent	10 November 2001 – 5 August 2013	Previously held the New South Wales Legislative Assembly seat of Tamworth. Retired
	Barnaby Joyce (1967–)	Nationals	7 September 2013 – 27 October 2017	Previously a member of the Senate representing Queensland. Served as minister under Abbott and as minister and Deputy Prime Minister under Turnbull and Morrison. Election results declared void due to dual citizenship. Subsequently re-elected. Incumbent
	Barnaby Joyce (1967–)	Nationals	2 December 2017 – 27 November 2025	Previously a member of the Senate representing Queensland. Served as minister under Abbott and as minister and Deputy Prime Minister under Turnbull and Morrison. Election results declared void due to dual citizenship. Subsequently re-elected. Incumbent
	Barnaby Joyce (1967–)	Independent	27 November 2025 – 8 December 2025	Previously a member of the Senate representing Queensland. Served as minister under Abbott and as minister and Deputy Prime Minister under Turnbull and Morrison. Election results declared void due to dual citizenship. Subsequently re-elected. Incumbent
	Barnaby Joyce (1967–)	One Nation	8 December 2025 – present	Previously a member of the Senate representing Queensland. Served as minister under Abbott and as minister and Deputy Prime Minister under Turnbull and Morrison. Election results declared void due to dual citizenship. Subsequently re-elected. Incumbent

== Election results ==
2025 Australian federal election: New England
Party	Candidate	Votes	%	±%
National	Barnaby Joyce	59,711	52.22	+1.44
Labor	Laura Hughes	23,233	20.32	+0.37
One Nation	Brent Larkham	11,387	9.96	+4.70
Greens	Wendy Wales	9,023	7.89	+0.38
Independent	Natasha Ledger	4,240	3.71	+1.21
Family First	Holly Masters	3,646	3.19	+3.19
Trumpet of Patriots	Todd Juchau	3,106	2.72	+2.72
Total formal votes		114,346	95.16	+1.64
Informal votes		5,816	4.84	−1.64
Turnout		120,162	91.56	+1.85
Two-party-preferred result
National	Barnaby Joyce	76,680	67.06	+1.85
Labor	Laura Hughes	37,666	32.94	−1.85
National hold		Swing	+1.85	
