= Alf McClelland =

Australian politician (1886–1969)

Alfred McClelland
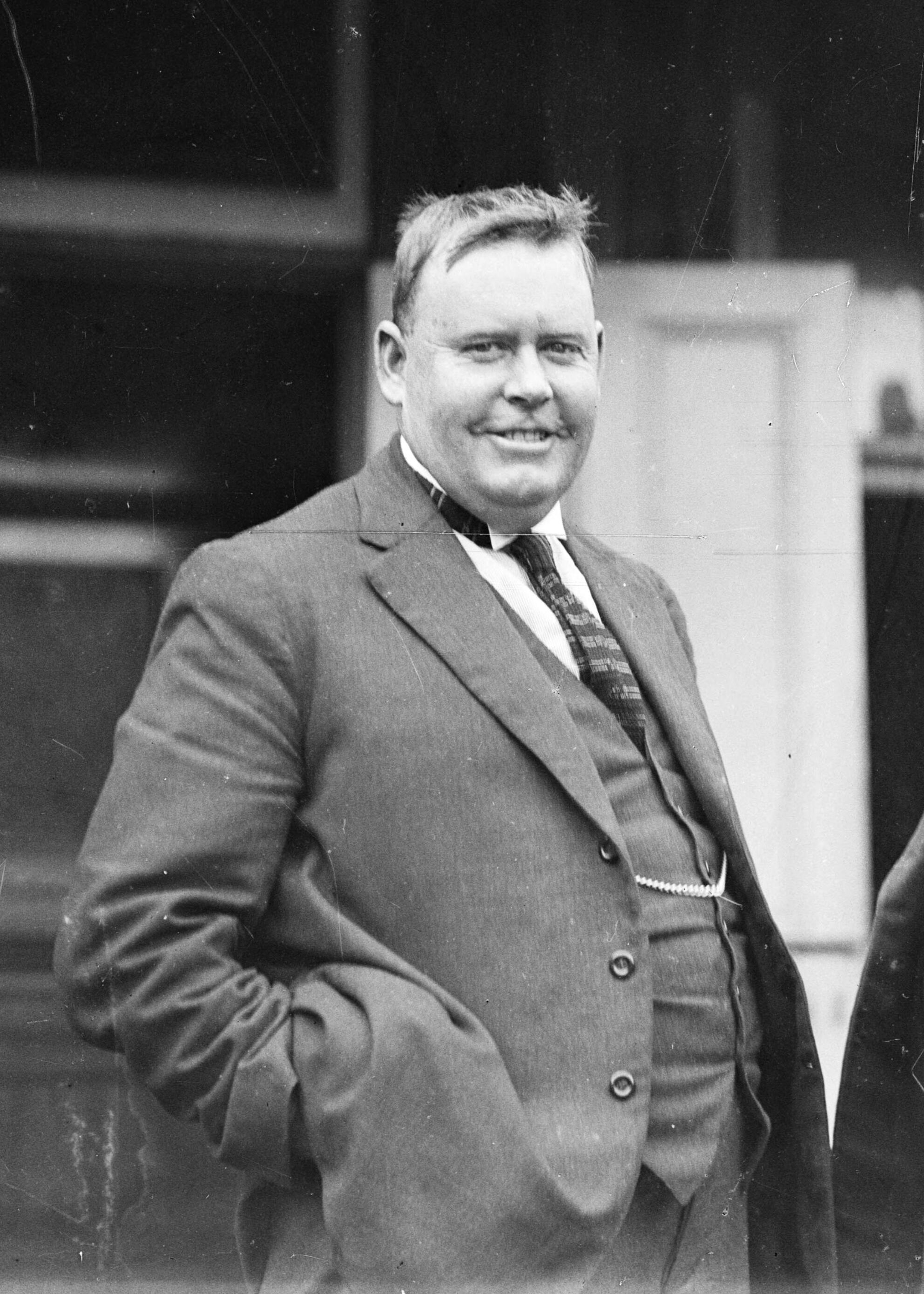
- McClelland in 1927

Member of the New South Wales Legislative Assembly
- In office 25 October 1930 – 18 May 1932
- Preceded by: New seat
- Succeeded by: George Wilson
- Constituency: Dubbo
- In office 20 March 1920 – 7 September 1927
- Preceded by: New seat
- Succeeded by: Seat abolished
- Constituency: Northern Tablelands

Personal details
- Born: 18 April 1886 Black Creek, New South Wales, Australia
- Died: 29 January 1969 (aged 82) Sydney, New South Wales, Australia
- Party: Labor
- Spouse: Gertrude Cooksley (m. 1918)
- Relations: Doug McClelland (son); Robert McClelland (grandson)
- Occupation: Bushworker; Trade unionist

Alfred McClelland (18 April 1886 – 29 January 1969) was an Australian politician. He was a Labor Party member of the New South Wales Legislative Assembly from 1920 until 1927, representing Northern Tablelands, and from 1930 to 1932, representing Dubbo. His son Doug McClelland and grandson Robert McClelland both went on to hold senior roles in federal politics, creating a rare three-generation political dynasty.

== Early life ==
McClelland was born at Black Creek, near Nundle, and was educated at Nundle Public School. He worked as a shearer and bushworker after leaving school, and was active in local affairs, founding the Nundle League in 1902. He was appointed as an organiser with the Australian Workers' Union in 1914, and was an executive councillor and the vice-president of the union's Western branch from 1916.

== State politics ==
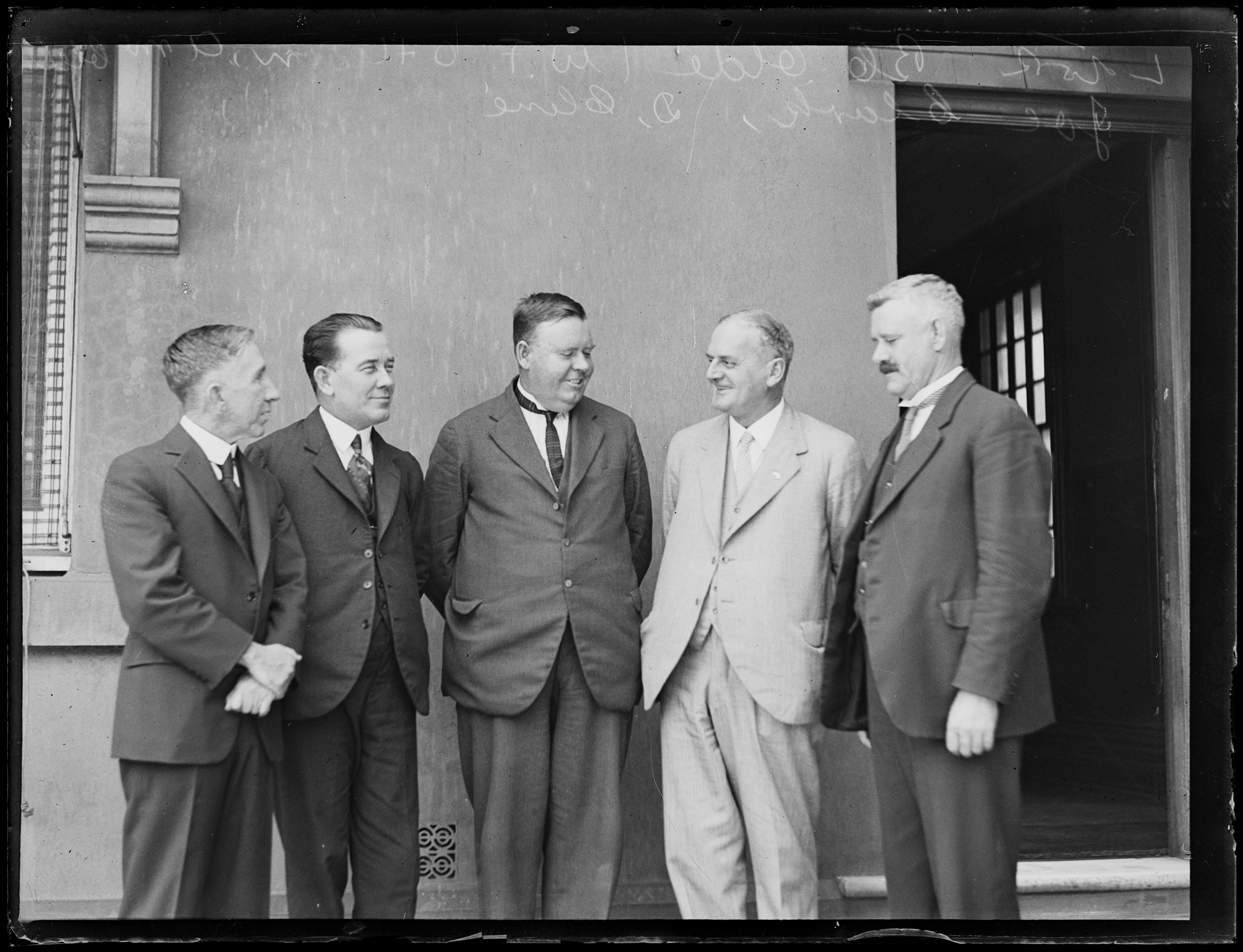
McClelland (centre) with fellow Labor MPs Barney Olde, Walter O'Hearn, Joe Clark and Daniel Clyne

McClelland was elected to parliament at the 1920 state election. He twice attempted to enter state politics before his 1920 victory, losing to Labor-turned-Nationalist MLA George McDonald in Bingara at a 1916 by-election and again in 1917. In 1920, on his third attempt, he was elected as the sole Labor member in the multi-member electorate of Northern Tablelands. He was easily re-elected in 1922 and 1925, but faced a very difficult race in 1927. The multi-member system had been abolished, and McClelland had chosen to contest the newly recreated seat of Armidale, which saw him challenged by prominent Country Party MLA David Drummond; Drummond won the seat in a landslide. He achieved a brief political comeback in 1930, winning newly recreated Dubbo, but lost it to the Country Party's George Wilson in the Labor defeat of 1932. McClelland again contested the seat in 1935, but was defeated, and did not run for public office again.

== Personal life ==
McClelland became a farmer at Northmead after leaving politics. He died in Sydney on 29 January 1969 and was cremated at Rookwood Cemetery.

McClelland's son, Doug McClelland, was a Senator from 1962 to 1987, and was a minister in the Whitlam government. His grandson, Robert McClelland, was federal Attorney-General from 2007 to 2011.

New South Wales Legislative Assembly
New district	Member for Northern Tablelands; 1920 – 1927; With: Michael Bruxner; David Drummond	District abolished
New district	Member for Dubbo; 1930 – 1932	Succeeded by George Wilson
