= Stuart St. Clair =

Australian lobbyist and politician

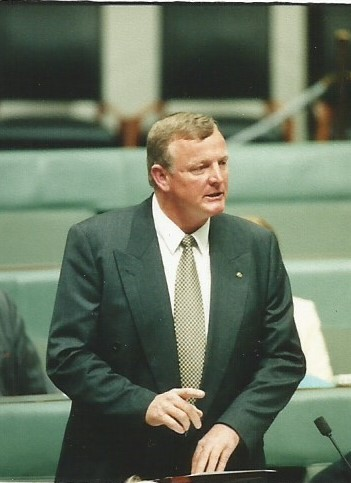

Member of the Australian Parliament for New England
- In office 3 October 1998 – 10 November 2001
- Preceded by: Ian Sinclair
- Succeeded by: Tony Windsor

Personal details
- Born: 21 November 1949 (age 76) Sydney, Australia
- Party: National Party of Australia
- Education: Sydney Church of England Grammar School
- Occupation: Sawmiller; Politician; Lobbyist

Stuart Roy St. Clair (born 21 November 1949) is an Australian former politician and lobbyist who was a member of the Australian House of Representatives for the Division of New England between 1998 and 2001, representing the Nationals. St. Clair served as the chief executive of the Australian Trucking Association between 2006 and 2015.

== Career ==
Born in Sydney in 1949, St. Clair was educated at Sydney Church of England Grammar School (Shore) and spent his early life as a small businessman in the timber industry as a merchant, sawmiller and truck driver before becoming involved in politics in the 1980s. He was elected to Guyra Shire Council in 1987 and became mayor in 1991 until his election as the Member for New England.

In 1998, St. Clair was preselected to succeed Ian Sinclair as the Nationals candidate for New England. He contested and won the subsequent election and served on a number of parliamentary committees during the 39th Parliament. In 2001, St. Clair was defeated by independent Tony Windsor on a 21-point swing, ending a nearly 80-year hold on the seat by the Nationals.

St. Clair then became the senior political advisor to the Deputy Prime Minister and Minister for Transport, John Anderson. In March 2006, St. Clair was appointed Chief Executive of the Australian Trucking Association until his retirement in 2015. St. Clair moved to the Margaret River area of Western Australia and continued his association with the Nationals, becoming Chairman of the Vasse Branch in 2016.

St. Clair is currently 2018–2019 the President of the Rotary Club of Busselton–Geographe Bay and a playing member of the Busselton Golf Club.

Parliament of Australia
Preceded by Ian Sinclair	Member for New England; 1998–2001	Succeeded by Tony Windsor
