= Frank Foster (Australian politician) =

Australian politician (1872–1948)

Frank Foster JP
- Foster in 1908

Member of the Australian Parliament for New England
- In office 12 December 1906 – 31 May 1913
- Preceded by: Edmund Lonsdale
- Succeeded by: Percy Abbott

Personal details
- Born: 1872 Sofala, New South Wales
- Died: 9 September 1948 (aged 75–76)
- Party: Australian Labor Party
- Occupation: Shopkeeper, orchardist

Francis James Foster (1872 – 9 September 1948) was an Australian politician, representing the Division of New England in the House of Representatives for the Australian Labor Party from 1906 to 1913.

== Background ==
Born in Sofala, New South Wales, he grew up in Wattle Flat, received a primary education and held various jobs including a miner, farmhand, teacher and shopkeeper. He also pursued fruit growing as an orchardist in Inverell. Foster was appointed the Chairman of 'The Royal Commission into Fruit Industry' in 1912. In 1914, Foster was elected President of the Western Beekeepers' Association.

== Politics ==
Foster was an unsuccessful Labor candidate for the New South Wales Legislative Assembly for The Macquarie at the 1895 election and 1898 election. He was also unsuccessful at the 1904 election for Gough and the 1904 Bingara by-election. At the 1906 election, he was selected as the Labor candidate for the seat of New England, and went on to defeat Anti-Socialist candidate Edmund Lonsdale. He was re-elected to a second term at the 1910 election, defeating Commonwealth Liberal candidate William Fleming. Twice successful by only small margins, Foster remains the only successful Labor candidate in the history of the seat of New England. He held the seat until his defeat by Commonwealth Liberal candidate Percy Abbott at the 1913 election. He made two attempts for the NSW Legislative Assembly, at the 1913 election for Darlinghurst and at the 1917 Macquarie by-election.

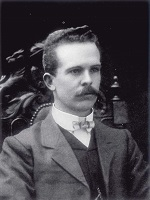
Francis Foster

He became a company director and died at a private hospital in Marrickville on 9 September 1948 (aged 75–76).

Parliament of Australia
Preceded by Edmund Lonsdale	Member for New England; 1906 – 1913	Succeeded by Percy Abbott
