= Victor Thompson (politician) =

Australian politician

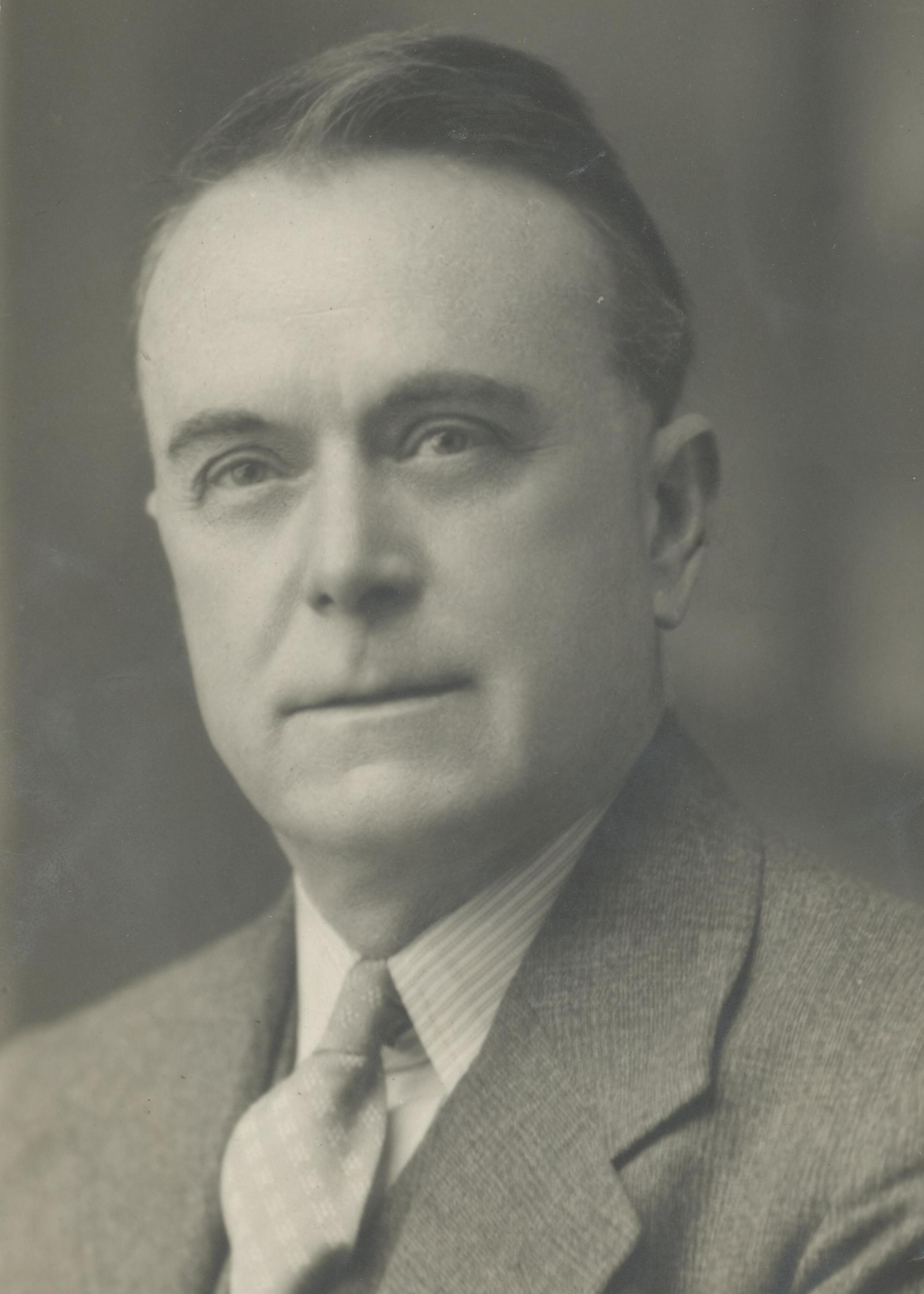

Member of the Australian Parliament for New England
- In office 16 December 1922 – 21 September 1940
- Preceded by: Alexander Hay
- Succeeded by: Joe Abbott

Personal details
- Born: Charles Victor Thompson; 10 September 1885 Sydney, New South Wales
- Died: 11 May 1968 (aged 82) Ashfield, New South Wales, Australia
- Party: Country
- Occupation: Journalist

Charles Victor Thompson (10 September 1885 – 11 May 1968) was an Australian politician and journalist.

Thompson was elected to the Australian House of Representatives seat of New England at the 1922 election, representing the Country Party of Australia. He was a Minister without portfolio in the fourth Lyons ministry and the Page ministry from November 1937 until April 1940. He lost his seat at the September 1940 election to another member of the Country Party, Joe Abbott.

== Early life ==
Thompson was born in Sydney on 10 September 1885, the son of Mary Annie (née Lewis) and Charles Thompson; his father was a carpenter. He was educated at state schools, including the Cleveland Street Public School.

== Journalism career ==
Thompson joined The Tamworth Daily Observer in 1911 as a senior reporter, having previously worked for newspapers in Narrabri, Murwillumbah and Albury. He was appointed as editor a few months later and oversaw its transformation into the Northern Daily Leader. He was appointed as a director of its holding company and eventually became one of its largest shareholders, only retiring from the board in 1965. He reportedly contributed over 15,000 articles to the Daily Leader.

== Personal life ==
Thompson married Emma Bell in 1907, with whom he had one daughter. He died in Ashfield, New South Wales, on 11 May 1968, aged 82.

== Notes ==
Parliament of Australia
| Preceded by Alexander Hay | Member for New England; 1922–1940 | Succeeded by Joe Abbott |
