= Electoral district of Bingara =

State electoral district of New South Wales, Australia

Bingara was an electoral district of the Legislative Assembly in the Australian state of New South Wales, created in 1894, partly from New England, and named after and including Bingara. It was abolished in 1920, with the introduction of proportional representation.

== Members for Bingara ==
Member	Party affiliation	Period
Samuel Moore	Free Trade	1894–1901
Samuel Moore	Liberal Reform	1901–1910
George McDonald	Labor	1910–1916
George McDonald	Independent	1916–1917
George McDonald	Nationalist	1917–1920

== Election results ==
1917 New South Wales state election: Bingara
Party	Candidate	Votes	%	±%
Nationalist	George McDonald	3,113	51.5	+3.7
Labor	Alfred McClelland	2,935	48.5	+0.7
Total formal votes		6,048	98.4	+1.0
Informal votes		95	1.6	−1.0
Turnout		6,143	65.5	−5.0
Member changed to Nationalist from Labor / Independent				

George McDonald had been elected as a Labor member in the 1913 election. He resigned from the party and his seat as a protest at the behaviour of the Easter 1916 NSW Labor conference and retained the seat at the by-election as an Independent.
