= Ian Sinclair =

Australian politician (born 1929)

The Right Honourable Ian Sinclair AC
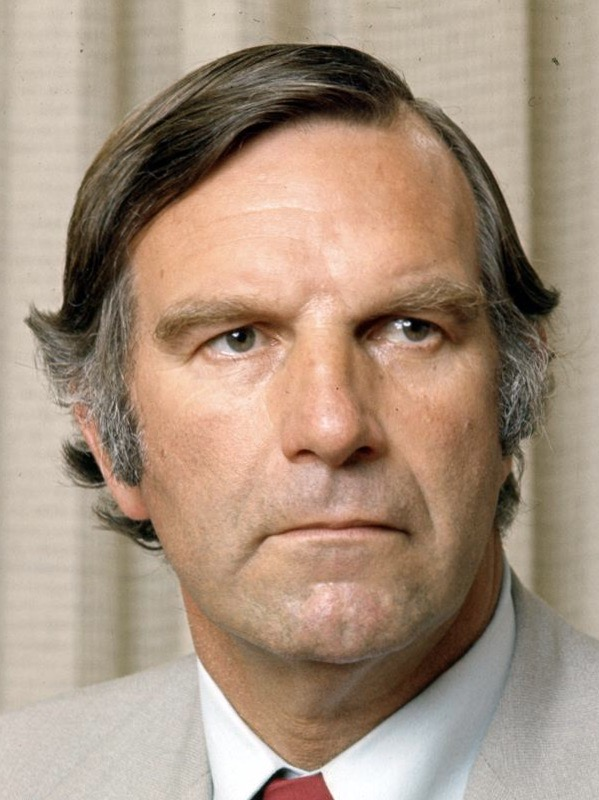
- Sinclair in 1975

23rd Speaker of the Australian House of Representatives
- In office 4 March 1998 – 31 August 1998
- Preceded by: Bob Halverson
- Succeeded by: Neil Andrew

Leader of the National Party
- In office 17 January 1984 – 9 May 1989
- Deputy: Ralph Hunt; Bruce Lloyd
- Preceded by: Doug Anthony
- Succeeded by: Charles Blunt

Deputy Leader of the National Party
- In office 2 February 1971 – 17 January 1984
- Leader: Doug Anthony
- Preceded by: Doug Anthony
- Succeeded by: Ralph Hunt
Parliamentary Offices
Father of the House
In office 20 February 1990 – 31 August 1998
Preceded by	Tom Uren
Succeeded by	Philip Ruddock
Leader of the House
In office 19 August 1980 – 7 May 1982
Leader	Malcolm Fraser
Preceded by	Ian Viner
Succeeded by	Sir James Killen
In office 22 December 1975 – 27 September 1979
Leader	Malcolm Fraser
Preceded by	Fred Daly
Succeeded by	Ian Viner
Manager of Opposition Business
In office 16 March 1983 – 28 April 1987
Leader	Malcolm Fraser; Andrew Peacock; John Howard
Preceded by	Lionel Bowen
Succeeded by	John Spender
In office 14 June 1974 – 11 November 1975
Leader	Billy Snedden; Malcolm Fraser
Preceded by	unknown
Succeeded by	Gordon Scholes
Cabinet Posts
Minister for Defence
In office 7 May 1982 – 11 March 1983
Prime Minister	Malcolm Fraser
Preceded by	Jim Killen
Succeeded by	Gordon Scholes
Minister for Communications
In office 3 November 1980 – 7 May 1982
Prime Minister	Malcolm Fraser
Preceded by	Tony Staley
Succeeded by	Neil Brown
Minister for Special Trade Representations
In office 19 August 1980 – 3 November 1980
Prime Minister	Malcolm Fraser
Preceded by	Douglas Scott
Succeeded by	office abolished
Minister for Primary Industry
In office 11 November 1975 – 27 September 1979
Prime Minister	Malcolm Fraser
Preceded by	Rex Patterson
Succeeded by	Peter Nixon
In office 5 February 1971 – 5 December 1972
Prime Minister	John Gorton; William McMahon
Preceded by	Doug Anthony
Succeeded by	Lance Barnard
Minister for Shipping and Transport
In office 28 February 1968 – 5 February 1971
Prime Minister	John Gorton
Preceded by	Gordon Freeth
Succeeded by	Peter Nixon
Minister for Social Services
In office 22 February 1965 – 28 February 1968
Prime Minister	Sir Robert Menzies; Harold Holt; John McEwen; John Gorton
Preceded by	Reginald Swartz
Succeeded by	Bill Wentworth

Member of the Australian Parliament for New England
- In office 30 November 1963 – 31 August 1998
- Preceded by: David Drummond
- Succeeded by: Stuart St. Clair

Member of the Legislative Council of New South Wales
- In office 23 April 1961 – 24 October 1963
- Succeeded by: Alexander Alam

Personal details
- Born: Ian McCahon Sinclair; 10 June 1929 (age 97) Sydney, New South Wales, Australia
- Party: National
- Spouses: Margaret Tarrant (m. 1956; died 1967) Rosemary Fenton (m. 1970)
- Relations: Peter King (son-in-law)
- Children: 4
- Occupation: Grazier

Ian McCahon Sinclair AC (born 10 June 1929) is an Australian former politician who served as a Member of Parliament for 35 years, and was leader of the National Party from 1984 to 1989. He served as either a minister or opposition frontbencher for all but a few months from 1965 to 1989, and later Speaker of the House of Representatives from March to August 1998–to date, the only Country/National MP to hold the post.

Sinclair was born in Sydney and studied law at the University of Sydney. He later bought a farming property near Tamworth. Sinclair was elected to parliament in 1963, and added to the ministry in 1965 as part of the Menzies Government. Over the following six years, he held various portfolios under Harold Holt, John McEwen, John Gorton and William McMahon. Sinclair was elected deputy leader of his party in 1971. He was a senior member of the Fraser government, spending periods as Minister for Primary Industry (1975–1979), Minister for Communications (1980–1982), and Minister for Defence (1982–1983). In 1984, Sinclair replaced Anthony as leader of the Nationals. He led the party to two federal elections, in 1984 and 1987, but was replaced by Charles Blunt in 1989. Sinclair was father of the parliament from 1990 until his retirement at the 1998 election. He spent his final six months in parliament as Speaker of the House of Representatives, following the sudden resignation of Bob Halverson. He also served as co-chair of the 1998 constitutional convention, alongside Barry Jones.

Sinclair is the earliest elected MP living (along with Senator Doug McClelland), the only surviving Country/Nationals MP elected in the 1960s. Additionally, he is the last surviving minister who served in the Menzies, Holt, McEwen, Gorton, and McMahon governments, as well as the First Fraser Ministry. He is entitled to the Right Honourable prefix as one of the few surviving Australian members of the Privy Council of the United Kingdom.

== Early life ==
Sinclair was born in Sydney on 10 June 1929. He was the son of Gertrude Hazel (née Smith) and George McCahon Sinclair. His father was a chartered accountant who also served as deputy mayor of Ku-ring-gai Council, chairman of Knox Grammar School, and an elder of the Presbyterian Church.

Sinclair attended Knox Grammar before going on to the University of Sydney, where he graduated Bachelor of Arts in 1949 and Bachelor of Laws in 1952. He served in the No. 22 Squadron RAAF from 1950 to 1952, as part of the Citizen Air Force. Sinclair served his articles of clerkship with Norton Smith & Co., but did not pursue a legal career. He instead took up a grazing property near Bendemeer and set up the Sinclair Pastoral Company, of which he became managing director. He was a director of the Farmers and Graziers' Co-operative Limited from 1962 to 1965.

Sinclair married Margaret Anne Tarrant in 1956, with whom he had one son and two daughters. She died of brain cancer in December 1967. He remarried on 14 February 1970 to Rosemary Fenton, who had been Miss Australia in 1960; they had one son together. His daughter Fiona married Liberal politician Peter King.

== Early political involvement ==
A member of the Country Party, Sinclair was appointed to the New South Wales Legislative Council in 1961. He resigned in order to seek election to the House of Representatives at the 1963 federal election, retaining the Division of New England for the Country Party after the retirement of David Drummond.

== Government minister ==
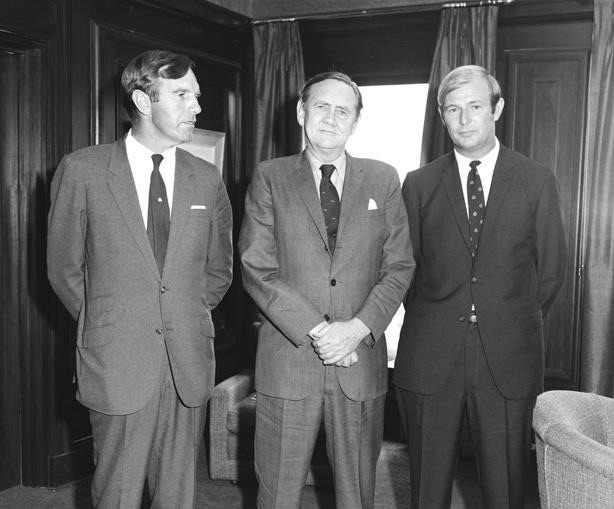
Sinclair (left) with John Gorton and Doug Anthony in 1971.

In 1965, Sinclair was appointed Minister for Social Services in the Menzies Government, replacing Hugh Roberton. He stood for the deputy leadership of the Country Party after the 1966 federal election, but was defeated by Doug Anthony. In 1968, he became Minister for Shipping and Transport in the Gorton government. When Country Party leader John McEwen retired in February 1971, Anthony was elected as his replacement and Sinclair defeated Peter Nixon for the deputy leadership. He was appointed Minister for Primary Industry. A month later, William McMahon replaced John Gorton as Liberal leader and prime minister. McMahon wanted Sinclair to become Minister for Foreign Affairs, but for various reasons had to keep him in the primary industry portfolio and appoint Les Bury as foreign minister instead. Sinclair did later serve as acting foreign minister in Bury's absence.

In 1973, Sinclair was one of the six Country MPs to vote in favour of John Gorton's motion calling for the decriminalisation of homosexuality. After spending the three years of the Whitlam Labor government in opposition, he again became Minister for Primary Industry in 1975, in the Fraser government. In 1977, Sinclair was appointed to the Privy Council of the United Kingdom.

=== Finnane Report and aftermath ===
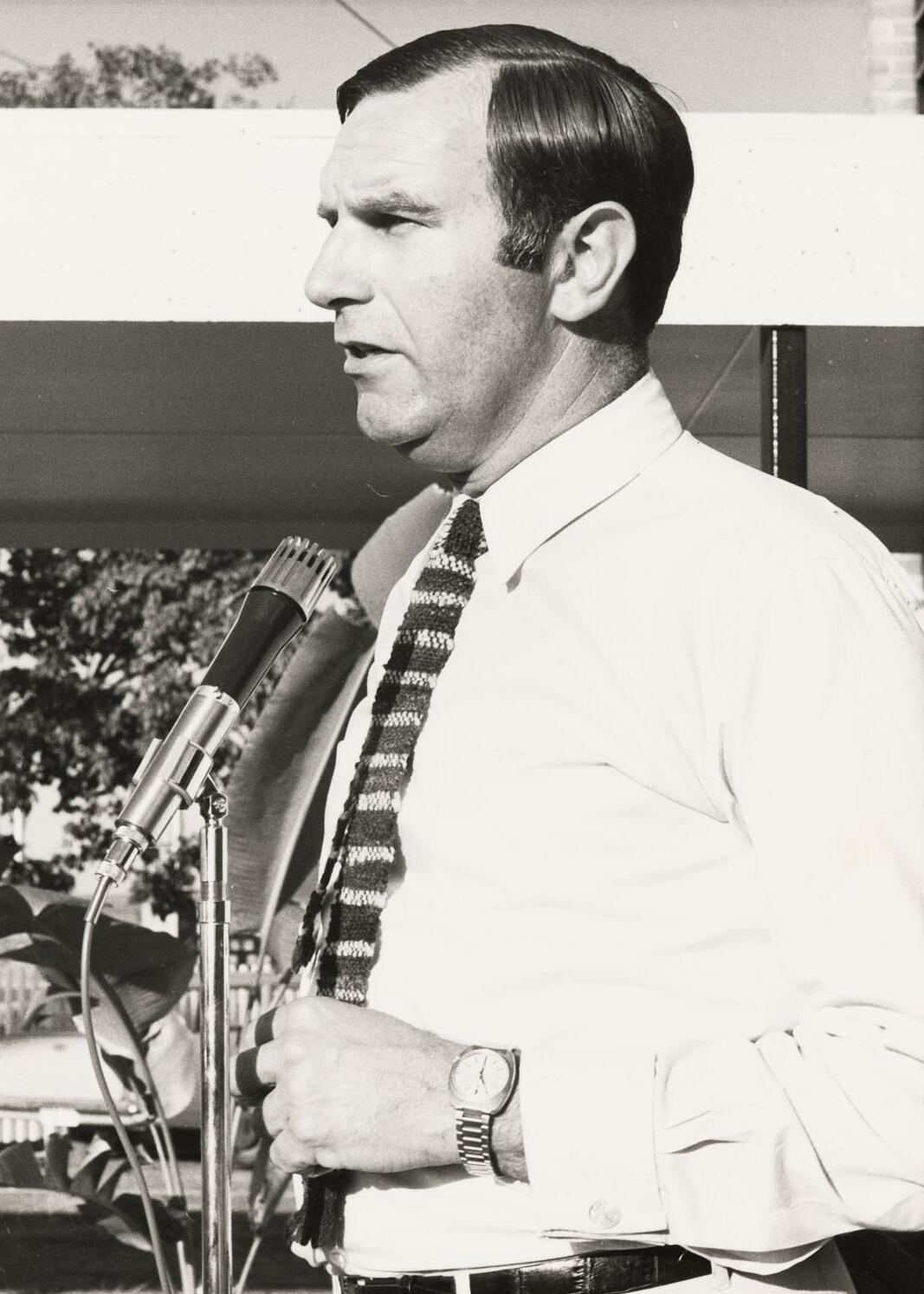
Sinclair addressing an audience in Darwin, Northern Territory, in 1970

In 1978, New South Wales Attorney-General Frank Walker appointed Michael Finnane to inquire into the financial dealings of Sinclair's father George, who had died in January 1976. The Finnane Report, which was tabled in the Parliament of New South Wales on 27 September 1979, alleged that Ian Sinclair had improperly loaned himself money from companies he controlled, attempted to conceal the loans, and forged his father's signature on company returns. As a result, Sinclair resigned from the ministry. His supporters criticised the report on several grounds, including that the inquiry was conducted in secret, that its release prejudiced Sinclair's right to a fair trial, and that it was politically biased as both Walker and Finnane were members of the ALP.

In April 1980, Sinclair was charged with nine counts of fraud, relating to forging, uttering, and making false statements on company returns. He was found not guilty on all charges on 15 August 1980, following a 23-day trial in the District Court of New South Wales.

Sinclair returned to the ministry in August 1980 as Minister for Special Trade Representations. After the 1980 election he was made Minister for Communications. He was finally made Minister for Defence in May 1982, holding the position until the government's defeat at the 1983 election.

== National Party leader, 1984–1989 ==
Doug Anthony announced his resignation as NCP leader in December 1983. Sinclair was elected as his replacement on 17 January 1984, defeating Stephen Lusher by an unspecified margin (the party did not release the results of leadership ballots). In an interview with Australian Playboy in July 1984, Sinclair acknowledged a previous extramarital relationship with socialite Glen-Marie North. Copies of the interview were distributed in his electorate during the 1984 election campaign. In the lead-up to the election, Sinclair controversially attributed the spread of HIV/AIDS in Australia to the Labor Party's recognition of de facto relationships and normalisation of homosexuality. After the deaths of three babies from HIV-contaminated blood transfusions, he stated that "if it wasn't for the promotion of homosexuality as a norm by Labor, I am quite confident that the very tragic and sad passing on of the AIDS disease [...] to those three poor babies would not have occurred.

In 1985, Sinclair came into conflict with the National Farmers' Federation over his claims that the organisation did not have the support of farmers. He also came into conflict with the Liberal Party on a number of occasions. He publicly rejected calls for a Liberal–National party merger, citing the incompatibility of the National Party's conservatism and the "small-l liberal" wing of the Liberal Party. In March 1986, he accused Liberals of undermining the leadership of John Howard and thereby harming the Coalition's chances of victory. He denounced former Liberal prime minister Malcolm Fraser's support of sanctions against apartheid South Africa, accusing him of "prejudice against Southern Africa and the whites there". Sinclair proclaimed a "deep abhorrence" of apartheid, but believed the sanctions were too "heavy-handed". He supported the re-admission of South Africa to the United Nations, the lifting of the sporting boycott, the re-establishment of an Australian trade commission, and direct flights between Australia and South Africa.

In addition to his leadership of the National Party, Sinclair also served as shadow defence minister. In August 1986, he suggested the formation of a Pacific trade bloc at a meeting of the International Democrat Union in Sydney. The proposal, also supported by shadow foreign minister Andrew Peacock, was designed to "minimise the harmful policies of major protectionist trading nations" like the U.S. and the European Communities. Later in the year, Sinclair questioned the value of ANZUS, stating that Australia should reconsider its commitments to New Zealand as it had become too isolationist. He also believed Australia should adopt a more assertive role than provided for in the Dibb Report. He opposed trade sanctions on Fiji following the 1987 coups d'état and was accused by foreign minister Bill Hayden of sympathising with the perpetrators.

In the lead-up to the 1987 election, Sinclair dealt with the "Joh for Canberra" campaign, an ambitious bid by Queensland Joh Bjelke-Petersen, leader of his party's most powerful state branch, to enter federal politics and become prime minister. The campaign "derailed any semblance of non-Labor unity from the beginning of 1987", and caused a split in the Coalition. Due to an ensuing rash of three-cornered contests, Labor won an increased majority. After the election, the Queensland branch continued its efforts to oust Sinclair from the leadership.

In the late 1980s, Sinclair was drawn into the debate over the levels of Asian immigration to Australia, favouring a reduction in the number of Asians allowed into the country. In August 1988, he said:

"What we are saying is that if there is any risk of an undue build-up of Asians as against others in the community, then you need to control it ... I certainly believe, that at the moment we need ... to reduce the number of Asians ... We don't want the divisions of South Africa, we don't want the divisions of London. We really don't want the colour divisions of the United States."

A few days later, Sinclair "toned down his statements" at the request of Howard and denied that he had specifically targeted Asians. The following month, following pressure from Howard, he sacked National Senate leader John Stone from the shadow ministry for making similar comments, "with regret". This was seen by many in his party as a capitulation to the Liberals.

In May 1989, there were simultaneous leadership challenges in both Coalition parties, with Peacock displacing Howard as Liberal leader and Charles Blunt replacing Sinclair. The immediate trigger for Sinclair's defeat was dissatisfaction with his conditional support for the Hawke government's deregulation of the wheat industry. However, there was also a sense that it was time for a generational change in the party leadership. When Blunt lost his seat at the 1990 election, Sinclair made an attempt to regain the NPA leadership, but was defeated by Tim Fischer, and retired to the back bench. He was thus the first NPA leader since the formation of the Coalition to have never served as Deputy Prime Minister of Australia.

== Later career ==
Sinclair underwent a double heart bypass surgery in September 1991. In March 1993, aged 63, ten days after the Coalition lost the 1993 federal election, Sinclair unsuccessfully challenged Tim Fischer for the party leadership.

By 1993, Sinclair was the Father of the House, the only sitting MP to have served with Robert Menzies, and "the last of the Right Honourables" (MPs with membership in the Privy Council). He was seen as a candidate for the speakership if the Coalition won the 1993 election, however this did not eventuate. He was re-elected for a 14th and final time in New England in the 1996 federal election. In June 1997 Howard appointed Sinclair as co-chairman of the Constitutional Convention, alongside Barry Jones, which debated the possibility of Australia becoming a republic; the Convention reported in February 1998 and set the basis for the 1999 Australian republic referendum. A staunch monarchist, Sinclair was a leading advocate for the successful 'No' campaign.

=== Speaker of the House, 1998 ===
Aged nearly 70, Sinclair announced his intention to retire from Parliament at the next federal election. When Speaker Bob Halverson suddenly resigned in March, Sinclair was elected to replace him, the first National to hold the post. He served as speaker for the last six months of his term, during which he usually wore an academic gown.

On his first day in office, Sinclair faced a motion of dissent from Labor opposition frontbencher Simon Crean when he ruled Labor MP Janice Crosio's question out of order; the dissent motion was not carried and Sinclair's ruling upheld. On 2 April, he named Crean apparently for shaking his head, although Sinclair maintained it was due to "disorderly conduct". When another Labor frontbencher Martin Ferguson remarked "You are a disgrace!" he was also subsequently named, for refusing to withdraw an "objectionable remark when directed to do so by the Chair".

Sinclair became Speaker during a controversial time for Parliament; as a result, he usually presided over raucous sessions and was seen at times as giving rulings lenient to the government whilst being combative to the opposition. However, his vast experience of Parliament quickly established him as an assertive Speaker. As of 2026, he is the only member of his party to have served as Speaker of the House of Representatives.

As a result of his election as Speaker, Sinclair wanted to remain in Parliament, in order to stay on as Speaker if the Howard government were to be re-elected. However, Stuart St. Clair had already been preselected as National candidate in New England. Ultimately, Sinclair was unable to reverse his retirement, and St. Clair refused to stand aside for him. St. Clair ultimately succeeded Sinclair at the 1998 election. At the time of his retirement, he was the last parliamentary survivor of the Menzies, Holt and Gorton governments.

== After politics ==
In January 2001, Sinclair was appointed a Companion of the Order of Australia (AC). As of 2009, Sinclair was the President of AUSTCARE, an international, non-profit, independent aid organisation. On 1 March 2000, Sinclair became the inaugural chairman of the Foundation for Rural and Regional Renewal (FRRR), a non-profit organisation which issues grants to regional communities. He retired on 30 June 2019 and was succeeded by Tim Fairfax. Sinclair also served for several years as the Honorary President of the Scout Association of Australia, New South Wales Branch, retiring in 2019. He received Scouts' National Presidents Award on World Scout Day 2020.

Political offices
Preceded by Reginald Swartz	Minister for Social Services; 1965–1968	Succeeded by Bill Wentworth
Preceded by Gordon Freeth	Minister for Shipping and Transport; 1968–1971	Succeeded by Peter Nixon
Preceded by Doug Anthony	Minister for Primary Industry; 1971–1972	Succeeded by Ken Wriedt
Preceded by Rex Patterson	Minister for Primary Industry; 1975–1979	Succeeded by Peter Nixon
Preceded by Paul Keating	Minister for Northern Australia; 1975	Succeeded by Evan Adermann
Preceded by Douglas Scott	Minister for Special Trade Representations; 1979–1980	Position abolished
Preceded by Tony Staley	Minister for Communications; 1980–1982	Succeeded by Neil Brown
Preceded by Jim Killen	Minister for Defence; 1982–1983	Succeeded by Gordon Scholes
Parliament of Australia
Preceded by David Drummond	Member for New England; 1963–1998	Succeeded by Stuart St. Clair
Preceded by Tom Uren	Father of the House of Representatives; 1990–1998	Succeeded by Philip Ruddock
Preceded by Robert Halverson	Speaker of the House of Representatives; 1998	Succeeded by Neil Andrew
Party political offices
Preceded by Doug Anthony	Leader of the National Country Party/ National Party of Australia; 1984–1989	Succeeded by Charles Blunt
Preceded by Doug Anthony	Deputy Leader of the Country Party/ National Country Party/ National Party of Australia; 1971–1984	Succeeded by Ralph Hunt
Honorary titles
Preceded by Bill Grayden	Earliest serving living MP; 2026–present	Incumbent
