= David Drummond (politician) =

Australian politician

The Honourable David Drummond
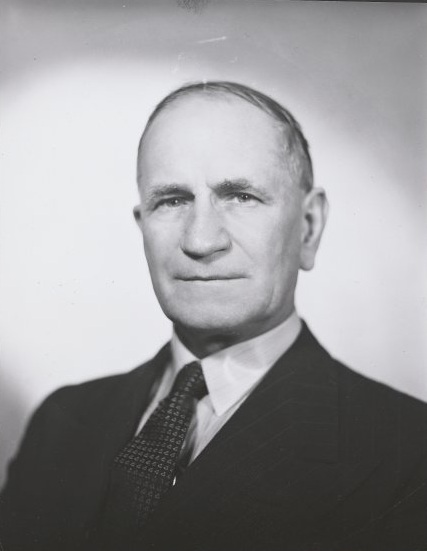

Member of the Australian Parliament for New England
- In office 10 December 1949 – 1 November 1963
- Preceded by: Joe Abbott
- Succeeded by: Ian Sinclair

Personal details
- Born: 11 February 1890 Lewisham, New South Wales
- Died: 13 June 1965 (aged 75) Armidale, New South Wales
- Party: Country Party
- Spouse: Pearl Hilda Victoria Goode
- Occupation: Farmhand

David Henry Drummond (11 February 1890–13 June 1965) was an Australian politician and farmer. He was a member of the Country Party and served in both the New South Wales Legislative Assembly (1920–1949) and the Australian House of Representatives (1949–1963).

== Early life ==
Drummond was born on 11 February 1890 in Lewisham, New South Wales. He was the fourth son born to Catherine (née McMillan) and Morris Cook Drummond; his parents had immigrated from Scotland.

Drummond's parents died when he was a small child – his mother in 1892 and his father in 1896 – leaving him an orphan. He was also left with hearing difficulties from a childhood infection. He began his education at public schools in Sydney and in 1901 began attending Scots College, but had to withdraw for financial reasons. He was made a ward of the state in October 1902 under the authority of the State Children's Relief Board.

In 1907, Drummond moved to Armidale, New South Wales, to work as a farmhand. He moved to Inverell in 1911 as a share farmer, also managing a wheat-growing property. He was rejected for military service during World War I due to his hearing problem. He was active in the Farmers' and Settlers' Association of New South Wales.

== State politics ==
Drummond was elected as a member of the New South Wales Legislative Assembly in 1920, representing Northern Tablelands for the Progressive Party, which in due course became the Country Party; and from 1927 to 1949 he was the member for Armidale. He was a foundation member of the New England New State Movement. He was Minister for Education from 1927 to 1930 and 1932 to 1941. He established the Armidale Teachers' College in the 1930s and helped establish the University of New England in 1937.

== Federal politics ==
In 1949, Drummond switched to federal politics and was elected to the House of Representatives seat of New England. Drummond retired in 1963 and died in Armidale in 1965.

== Drummond's Publications ==
- Drummond, D H (1926), Constitutional Change in Australia: Current Problems and Contributing Factors, Glen Innes
- Drummond, D H (June 1931), "The New States Movement - Its Basis and Objectives", The Australian Quarterly, vol. 3, no. 10, pp. 46–57
- Drummond, D H (1933), Australian Problems of Government: Federation vs Unification, Armidale: Armidale Express Print
- Drummond, D H (1937), "Some Economic Aspects of Education", Lecture 1, 1937 Session, Blennerhassett's Institute of Accountancy, Sydney
- Drummond, D H (1937), Report of Inquiries made into various aspects of Education during a visit to the United Kingdom, Europe, the United States of America and Canada, and Proceedings of the 1936 New Education Fellowship Conference at Cheltenham, England, Sydney: Government Printer
- Drummond, D H (1940), Technical Education in relation to Defence, Sydney: Government Printer
- Drummond, D H (1940), Australia's Changing Constitution: No States or New States, Sydney: Angus & Robertson
- Drummond, D H (1944), "The General Case for Revision of the Constitution", in Maughan, David; Drummond D H; Spender P C & Bland, FA (eds.), Constitutional Revision in Australia, Sydney: Australasian Publishing Company in conjunction with the Australian Institute of Political Science
- Drummond, D H (1954), The Future of Education in Australia, Armidale: Armidale Express Print
- Drummond, D H (1955), Australian Dilemma, Armidale: Armidale Express Print
- Drummond, D H (1959), A University is Born. The Story of the Founding of the University College of New England, Sydney: Angus & Robertson
- Drummond, D H (October 1961), "The Changing Tides of Education", Journal and Proceedings, vol. 2, no. 1, Armidale and District Historical Society, pp. 1–11

New South Wales Legislative Assembly
| New district | Member for Northern Tablelands; 1920–1927; With: Bruxner; McClelland | District divided into Armidale and Tenterfield |
| New district | Member for Armidale; 1927–1949 | Succeeded by Davis Hughes |
Parliament of Australia
| Preceded by Joe Abbott | Member for New England; 1949–1963 | Succeeded by Ian Sinclair |
