= Joe Abbott (Australian politician) =

Australian politician (1891–1965)

The Honourable Joe Abbott OBE, MC
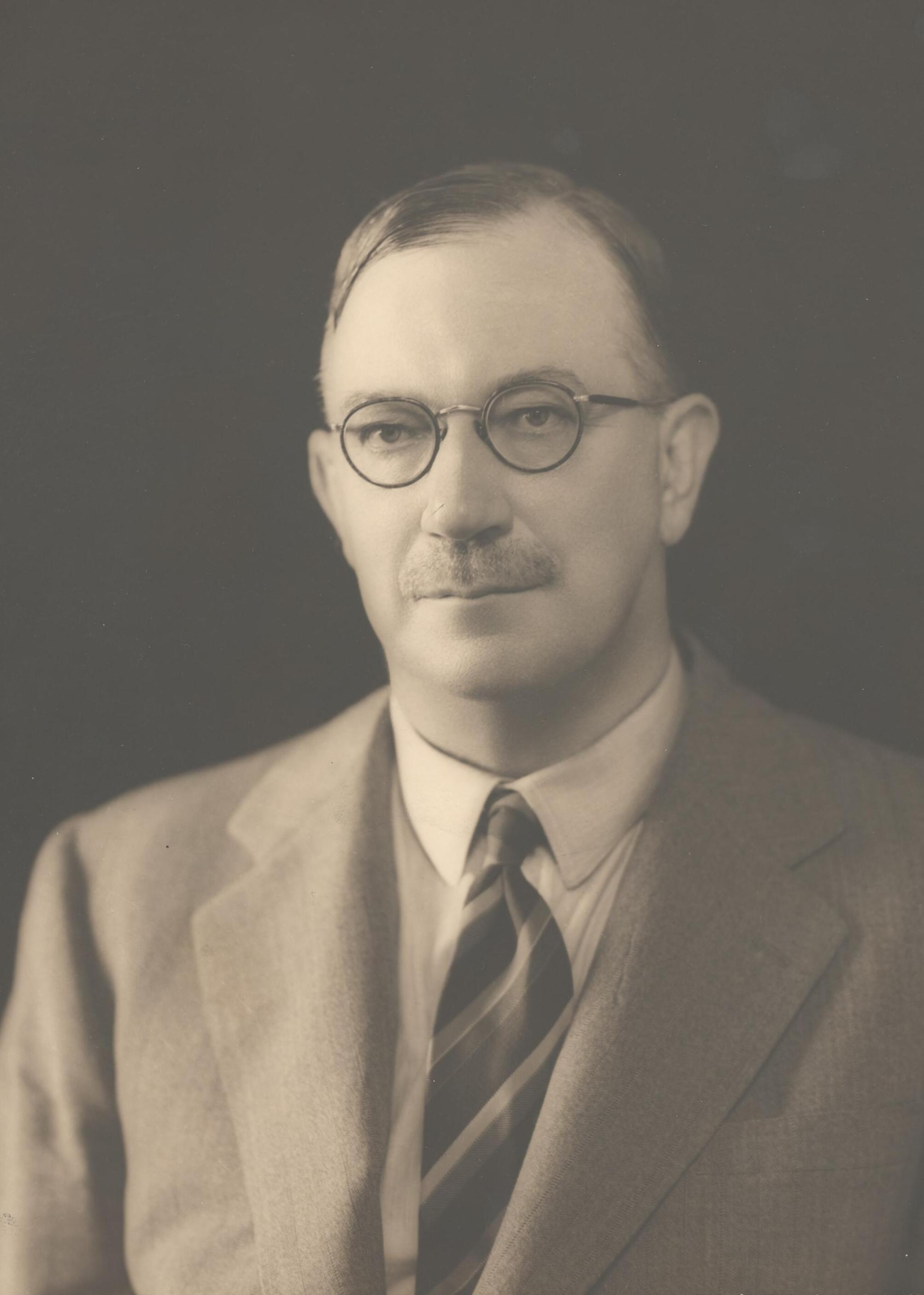

Minister for Home Security
- In office 26 June 1941 – 7 November 1941
- Prime Minister: Robert Menzies; Arthur Fadden
- Preceded by: New office
- Succeeded by: Bert Lazzarini

Member of the Australian Parliament for New England
- In office 21 September 1940 – 31 October 1949
- Preceded by: Victor Thompson
- Succeeded by: David Drummond

Personal details
- Born: 18 October 1891 North Sydney, New South Wales, Australia
- Died: 7 May 1965 (aged 73) Camperdown, New South Wales, Australia
- Party: Country
- Spouse: Katherine Bliss Wilkinson (m. 1924)
- Relations: Mac Abbott (half-brother)
- Education: The Armidale School
- Occupation: Soldier, farmer

Military service
- Allegiance: Australia; United Kingdom
- Branch/service: Australian Imperial Force (1915); British Army (1915–19)
- Rank: Lieutenant
- Battles/wars: First World War
- Awards: Officer of the Order of the British Empire; Military Cross

Joseph Palmer Abbott OBE, MC (18 October 1891 – 7 May 1965) was an Australian politician. He was a member of the Country Party and served in the House of Representatives from 1940 to 1949, representing the Division of New England. During World War II he briefly held ministerial office as Minister for Home Security and assistant minister to the defence and army ministers.

== Early life and career ==
Abbott was born in North Sydney, New South Wales, son of Joseph Palmer Abbott and his second wife Edith (née Solomon), and educated at The Armidale School and the University of Sydney, where he graduated with a Bachelor of Arts in 1913.

He enlisted in the Australian Imperial Force in February 1915 and served at Gallipoli. He was invalidated to England in October 1915 where he was discharged from the AIF so that he could join the Royal Field Artillery of the British Army as an officer in December 1915. In September 1918, during the Hundred Days Offensive, he was awarded the Military Cross while serving on the Western Front for putting out a fire. The citation for the medal, which appeared in The London Gazette in September 1918, reads as follows:

For conspicuous gallantry and devotion to duty when enemy shelling set fire to charges and exploded shells in two gun pits. He ran with two men and jumped into a burning pit, and by tearing down the burning camouflage extinguished the fire. His promptitude and courage were of great service.

After the war, he became a farmer near Wingen and in 1924, he married Katherine Bliss Wilkinson. He was president of the Graziers' Association of New South Wales 1935–1939 and was president of the Graziers' Federal Council of Australia in 1937 and 1938.

== Political career ==
Abbott was elected as a Country Party member for the Australian House of Representatives seat of New England in the 1940 election. He was appointed to the new portfolio of Home Security in the Menzies ministry in June 1941 and was responsible for civil defence until the fall of the Fadden government in November 1941. In 1942 he was appointed chairman of the Administrative Planning Committee, which was responsible for organising supplies for the United States forces in Australia during World War II. He retired from parliament prior to the 1949 election.

== Personal life ==
Abbott was appointed an Officer of the Order of the British Empire (OBE) in 1951. He died in the Sydney suburb of Camperdown, New South Wales and was survived by his wife and a son. One of his half-brothers, Mac, was the member for Upper Hunter in the New South Wales Legislative Assembly from 1913 to 1918 and a Senator from 1935 to 1941, while the other John Henry was a novelist and poet.

== Notes ==
Political offices
New title	Minister for Home Security; 1941	Succeeded by Bert Lazzarini
Parliament of Australia
Preceded by Victor Thompson	Member for New England; 1940–1949	Succeeded by David Drummond
