= Percy Abbott (Australian politician) =

Australian politician (1869–1940)

Percy Abbott CMG, VD
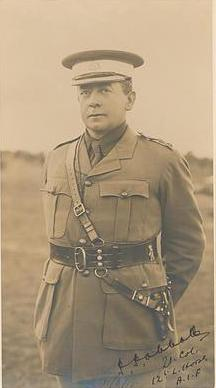

Member of the Australian Parliament for New England
- In office 31 May 1913 – 3 November 1919
- Preceded by: Frank Foster
- Succeeded by: Alexander Hay

Senator for New South Wales
- In office 14 November 1925 – 30 June 1929

Personal details
- Born: 14 May 1869 Hobart, Tasmania
- Died: 9 September 1940 (aged 71) Tamworth, New South Wales
- Party: Liberal (1913–17); Nationalist (1917–19); Country (1925–28)
- Spouse: Elizabeth Matilda Ross (née King)
- Occupation: Soldier

Military service
- Allegiance: Australia
- Branch/service: Australian Army
- Years of service: 1898–1929
- Rank: Lieutenant Colonel
- Commands: 12th Light Horse Regiment (1915, 1917–29); 63rd Battalion (1917); 10th Light Horse Regiment (1915); 5th Light Horse Regiment (1913–15)
- Battles/wars: First World War
- Awards: Companion of the Order of St Michael and St George; Mentioned in Despatches; Colonial Auxiliary Forces Officers' Decoration

Percy Phipps Abbott, CMG, VD (14 May 1869 – 9 September 1940) was an Australian soldier, politician and solicitor.

== Early life ==
Born in Hobart, Tasmania, to John William Abbott and Mary Ann, née Phipps, he was educated at The Hutchins School in Hobart and in 1889 was sent to Sydney as an assistant to a solicitor called Thomas Creswell. He was admitted to the practice in 1894. He was an active man and participated in rowing and cricket, and also enrolled as a special constable during the wharf labourers' strike of 1891.

== Local and federal politics ==
Moving to a Glen Innes practice in 1893, Abbott married Elizabeth Matilda Ross, née King, at Tamworth on 2 September 1901, and continued to be an active sportsman. He was involved in a wide variety of local organisations, including the Northern Border Cricket Association and Glen Innes Rifle Club, as well as being a keen fisherman and racehorse breeder. He served on Glen Innes Municipal Council (1898–1904, 1906–1914) and was mayor from 1910 to 1913, as well as being president of the hospital board. In 1913, backed by the Farmers and Settlers' Association, he was elected to the Australian House of Representatives as a member of the Commonwealth Liberal Party for the seat of New England, which he represented until 1919 (during which time the party had morphed into the Nationalist Party).

== Military service ==
In 1898, Abbott joined the 4th Infantry Regiment as a second lieutenant, moving, by 1905, to the 6th Australian Light Horse. He was a captain by 1908 and a major the next year, and commanded the 5th Light Horse from 1913. In March 1915 he sailed for Egypt as a lieutenant colonel in the Australian Imperial Force. His diary contains many declarations of the "wickedness of Germany", and there are still strong indications of a sense of Australian egalitarianism. He was a fierce critic of British strategy at Gallipoli, and was soon commander of the 10th Light Horse.

In October 1915 Abbott was evacuated to England with enteric fever, where he maintained his standing by commanding the Australian staging camps. A strong supporter of conscription who was horrified at the number of troops voting against it, he was appointed a Companion of the Order of St Michael and St George in June 1917 and was selected as commander of the 63rd Battalion, which was disbanded before it could serve. He distinguished himself in France with the 30th Battalion, and by the year's end was again commander of the 12th Light Horse Regiment. He was forced to return to Australia in April 1918 suffering recurrences of enteric fever, as well as a chronic eye complaint and the effects of gas, but continued to command the 12th (or, as it became, New England Light Horse) until 1929. He was awarded the Colonial Auxiliary Forces Officers' Decoration in 1919.

== Return to politics ==
In 1919, having re-established himself as a solicitor, Abbott headed the Country Party's New England campaign for the state election, accompanying Sir Michael Bruxner on his electoral tour. Although he failed in an attempt to be elected to the Senate in 1922, he succeeded in taking a seat in 1925, only to lose it again in 1928. An unpredictable and sometimes bitter parliamentarian, Abbott spoke frequently on many matters and was known for his charming and humorous speeches. He sat on the 1927–29 royal commission on the Constitution, presenting several minority reports.

== Later life ==
Abbott sold his firm in 1932 to his eldest son and retired to Tamworth. Unable to settle into a quiet retirement, he established a new practice, and was a member of the Union and Civic clubs in Sydney. When he died on 9 September 1940 of asthmatic bronchitis and heart failure, he left his wife and four children (three sons and a daughter) with a huge amount of debt (around £16,611).

Parliament of Australia
Preceded by Frank Foster	Member of the House of Representatives for New England; 1913–1919	Succeeded by Alexander Hay
