= Alexander Hay (Australian politician) =

Australian politician

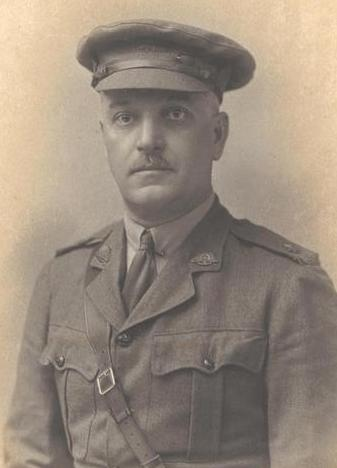

Member of the Australian Parliament for New England
- In office 13 December 1919 – 16 December 1922
- Preceded by: Percy Abbott
- Succeeded by: Victor Thompson

Personal details
- Born: 8 January 1865 Auckland, New Zealand
- Died: 8 May 1941 (aged 76)
- Party: Nationalist (1919–20); Country (1920–21); Independent (1921–22)
- Occupation: Farmer

Alexander Hay (8 January 1865 – 8 May 1941) was a New Zealand-born Australian pastoralist, businessman and politician. He was a member of the Australian House of Representatives from 1919 to 1922, representing the electorate of New England for the Nationalist Party (1919–1920), Country Party (1920–1921) and as an independent (1921–1922).

Hay was born at Parua Bay in New Zealand and was educated at Auckland Grammar School. He migrated to Australia in 1893 and visited England for the purposes of importing cattle in 1894. His brother, Sir John Hay, had inherited the substantial Berry Estate and Coolangatta Estate following the death of his cousin, David Berry, and in 1895 Alexander Hay joined his brother in managing the estates. They undertook a significant development project which saw about 400 freeholders settled onto the land, while retaining the Coolangatta Homestead as their own. Along with his brother, he was heavily involved in the development of the Berry Central Butter Factory. Hay subsequently undertook successful investments in pastoral properties in Queensland, which he in turn invested into mining concerns in New South Wales, including the Mount Royal Copper Mine, and rubber interests in the Territory of Papua.

He was an unsuccessful candidate at the first federal election for Illawarra (Protectionist) at the 1903 Glen Innes by-election (Progressive) for the New South Wales Legislative Assembly, and again in the 1914 election for Hunter (Commonwealth Liberal Party).

Hay enlisted for service in World War I in October 1915 in the 2nd Remount Unit and was posted to Egypt; he was promoted to major during his deployment and returned to Australia in 1916.

At the 1919 election, he was elected to the House of Representatives as a Nationalist, representing the seat of New England. He had also been endorsed by the Farmers and Settlers' Association, and joined the Country Party when it was formed in 1920. His tendency to vote against his party resulted in his expulsion in October 1921 after he saved the Hughes Nationalist government from defeat by voting against a Country Party censure motion. He contested the 1922 federal election as an independent but was unsuccessful.

He retired from politics and returned to his farming and business interests after his 1922 defeat. He died at Coolangatta Estate in 1941.

Parliament of Australia
Preceded by Percy Abbott	Member for New England; 1919 – 1922	Succeeded by Victor Thompson
