= George McDonald (Australian politician) =

Australian politician (1883–1951)

The Honourable George McDonald

Member of the New South Wales Parliament for Bingara
- In office 14 October 1910 – 5 February 1920
- Preceded by: Samuel Moore
- Succeeded by: Seat abolished

Personal details
- Born: 29 January 1883 Sydney
- Died: 28 July 1951 (aged 68) Bellevue Hill, New South Wales
- Party: Labor (1910–16); Independent (1916–17); Nationalist (1917–37); Independent (1937–49)
- Occupation: Barrister

George Roy William McDonald (29 January 1883 – 28 July 1951) was an Australian politician.

== Legal career ==
McDonald was born in Sydney, the son of mining engineer George McDonald and his wife Margaret McNamara. He was educated in public schools in the Parramatta district and became a deposition clerk in the Justice Department at Broken Hill in 1901. After transferral to the ministerial office in Sydney, his career as a clerk continued through appointments as Clerk of Petty Sessions at Goulburn, Albury and finally Bathurst. He resigned in 1908 and began a crown land and mining agency in Tamworth, acquiring a similar business in Sydney from 1911 to 1919.

McDonald was called to the Bar in 1927 and admitted as a solicitor in 1937, establishing his own firm. He was also vice-president of the NRMA in 1924 and continued to be involved with that body.

== Political career ==
In 1910, McDonald was elected to the New South Wales Legislative Assembly as the Labor member for Bingara. He remained as a Labor member until the State Conference of April 1916, when the conference censured the Labor Government over premier William Holman's failure to appoint Labor members to the Legislative Council. Holman's subsequent resignation as Labor leader and replacement with John Storey, and then the conference's reversal of opinion and reinstatement of Holman as leader, caused something of a farce. During this conference, McDonald resigned both as member for Bingara and from the Labor Party, winning re-election at a by-election as an Independent, after Liberal Leader Charles Wade arranged for no conservative opposition. By the 1917 state election, McDonald had joined the new Nationalist Party, and won election under that designation.

In 1920, McDonald's seat of Bingara was abolished, but he was immediately appointed to the Legislative Council, where he served until 1930 and was granted retention of the title "The Honourable" for life. McDonald resigned from the Legislative Council to stand as the Nationalist candidate for the Legislative Assembly seat of Barwon in 1930, but finished third behind Labor and the Country Party, attaining barely 10% of the primary vote. He was unsuccessful as an Ind. United Australia candidate at the 1937 Woollahra by-election, attaining 11% of the primary vote. McDonald was also unsuccessful as an Independent candidate for the Australian Senate in 1931, and 1949, as well as the federal seats of Wentworth in 1940, and Gwydir in 1946.

== Personal life ==
On 4 September 1923, McDonald married May Camille Dezarnaulds, with whom he had a single son. He died at Bellevue Hill on 28 July 1951 (aged 68) and was cremated in Woollahra.

According to Woollahra Council's 1921 rates book, McDonald owned two lots of land, each 50 feet wide and now known as 41 Drumalbyn Road, Bellevue Hill NSW, being Lots 1 & 2 of Section D, 3rd Subdivision of Cooper's Bellevue Hill – Bondi Estate, which was probably put to auction for the first time on 15 March 1919. His postal address (per the rates book) was 32 Elizabeth Street, Sydney. The UCV (Unimproved Capital value) and the ICV (Improved CV) were the same (implying vacant land) at 925 pounds for the years 1921, 1922 & 1923. The 1924 rates book records him as Geo R. Wm. McDonald (32 Elizabeth St) owning 41 Drumalbyn Road with UCV of 1200 pounds and also owning Lots 3 & 4 with a UCV of 400 pounds each. In 1927 the rates book records him as George Roy Wm. M.L.C. McDonald (appearing to have sold Lots 1 & 2) owning vacant land Lots 3 & 4 with a UCV of 950 pounds each with an address of Land Agency, 15 Castlereagh Street, Sydney. The rates book in years 1936 & 1937 has the (Hon.) George Roy William Mc Donald's address as 164 Phillip Street, Sydney.

New South Wales Legislative Assembly
Preceded by Samuel Moore	Member for Bingara; 1910–1920	Succeeded by Abolished
