= Labour government =

Labour government or Labor government may refer to:

== Australia ==
In Australian politics, a Labor government may refer to the following governments administered by the Australian Labor Party:

- Watson government, one Australian ministry under Chris Watson
  - Watson Ministry, the Australian government under Chris Watson (1904)
- Fisher government, three Australian ministries under Andrew Fisher
  - First Fisher Ministry, the Australian government under Andrew Fisher (1908–1909)
  - Second Fisher Ministry, the Australian government under Andrew Fisher (1910–1913)
  - Third Fisher Ministry, the Australian government under Andrew Fisher (1914–1915)
- Hughes Government (1915–16), one Australian ministry under Billy Hughes
  - First Hughes Ministry, the Australian government under Billy Hughes (1915–1916)
- Scullin Government, one Australian ministry under James Scullin
  - Scullin Ministry, the Australian government under James Scullin (1929–1932)
- Curtin government, two Australian ministries under John Curtin
  - First Curtin Ministry, the Australian government under John Curtin (1941–1943)
  - Second Curtin Ministry, the Australian government under John Curtin (1943–1945)
- Forde Government, one Australian ministry under Frank Forde
  - Forde Ministry, the Australian government under Frank Forde (1945)
- Chifley government, two Australian ministries under Ben Chifley
  - First Chifley Ministry, the Australian government under Ben Chifley (1945–1946)
  - Second Chifley Ministry, the Australian government under Ben Chifley (1946–1949)
- Whitlam government, three Australian ministries under Gough Whitlam
  - First Whitlam Ministry, the Australian government under Gough Whitlam (1972)
  - Second Whitlam Ministry, the Australian government under Gough Whitlam (1972–1974)
  - Third Whitlam Ministry, the Australian government under Gough Whitlam (1974–1975)
- Hawke government, four Australian ministries under Bob Hawke
  - First Hawke Ministry, the Australian government under Bob Hawke (1983–1984)
  - Second Hawke Ministry, the Australian government under Bob Hawke (1984–1987)
  - Third Hawke Ministry, the Australian government under Bob Hawke (1987–1990)
  - Fourth Hawke Ministry, the Australian government under Bob Hawke (1990–1991)
- Keating government, two Australian ministries under Paul Keating
  - First Keating Ministry, the Australian government under Paul Keating (1991–1993)
  - Second Keating Ministry, the Australian government under Paul Keating (1993–1996)
- Rudd government (2007–10), one Australian ministry under Kevin Rudd
  - First Rudd Ministry, the Australian government under Kevin Rudd
- Gillard government, two Australian ministries under Julia Gillard
  - First Gillard Ministry, the Australian government under Julia Gillard (2010)
  - Second Gillard Ministry, the Australian government under Julia Gillard (2010–2013)
- Rudd government (2013), one Australian ministry under Kevin Rudd
  - Second Rudd Ministry, the Australian government under Kevin Rudd
- Albanese Government, one Australian ministry under Anthony Albanese
  - Albanese Ministry, one Australian ministry under Anthony Albanese

== Israel ==
In Israeli politics, a Labor government may refer to the following governments administered by the Israeli Labor Party:

- Thirteenth government of Israel, the Israeli government under Levi Eshkol (1966–1969)
- Fourteenth government of Israel, the Israeli government under Golda Meir (1969)
- Fifteenth government of Israel, the Israeli government under Golda Meir (1969–1974)
- Sixteenth government of Israel, the Israeli government under Golda Meir (1974)
- Seventeenth government of Israel, the Israeli government under Yitzhak Rabin (1974–1977)
- Twenty-first government of Israel, the Israeli government under Shimon Peres (1984–1986)
- Twenty-fifth government of Israel, the Israeli government under Yitzhak Rabin (1992–1995)
- Twenty-sixth government of Israel, the Israeli government under Shimon Peres (1995–1996)
- Twenty-eighth government of Israel, the Israeli government under Ehud Barak (1999–2001)

== Malta ==
In Maltese politics, a Labour government may refer to the following governments administered by the Labour Party:

- Maltese Government 1947–50, the Maltese government under Paul Boffa
- Maltese Government 1955–58, the Maltese government under Dom Mintoff
- Maltese Government 1971–76, the Maltese government under Dom Mintoff
- Maltese Government 1976–81, the Maltese government under Dom Mintoff
- Maltese Government 1981–87, the Maltese government under Dom Mintoff and Karmenu Mifsud Bonnici respectively
- Maltese Government 1996–98, the Maltese government under Alfred Sant
- Maltese Government 2013–17, the Maltese government under Joseph Muscat
- Maltese Government 2017–22, the Maltese government under Joseph Muscat

== Netherlands ==
In Dutch politics, a Labour government may refer to the following governments administered by the Labour Party:

- Drees–Van Schaik cabinet, the Dutch government under Willem Drees and Josef van Schaik (1948–1951)
- First Drees cabinet, the Dutch government under Willem Drees (1951–1952)
- Second Drees cabinet, the Dutch government under Willem Drees (1952–1956)
- Third Drees cabinet, the Dutch government under Willem Drees (1956–1958)
- Den Uyl cabinet, the Dutch government under Joop den Uyl (1973–1977)
- First Kok cabinet, the Dutch government under Wim Kok (1994–1998)
- Second Kok cabinet, the Dutch government under Wim Kok (1998–2002)

== New Zealand ==
In New Zealand politics, a Labour government may refer to the following governments administered by the New Zealand Labour Party:

- First Labour Government of New Zealand, the New Zealand government under Michael Joseph Savage and Peter Fraser respectively (1935–1949)
- Second Labour Government of New Zealand, the New Zealand government under Walter Nash (1957–1960)
- Third Labour Government of New Zealand, the New Zealand government under Norman Kirk and Bill Rowling respectively (1972–1975)
- Fourth Labour Government of New Zealand, the New Zealand government under David Lange, Geoffrey Palmer, and Mike Moore respectively (1984–1990)
- Fifth Labour Government of New Zealand, the New Zealand government under Helen Clark (1999–2008)
- Sixth Labour Government of New Zealand, the New Zealand government under Jacinda Ardern and Chris Hipkins respectively (2017–2023)

== Norway ==
In Norwegian politics, a Labour government may refer to the following governments administered by the Labour Party:

- Hornsrud's Cabinet, the Norwegian government under Christopher Hornsrud (1928)
- Nygaardsvold's Cabinet, the Norwegian government under Johan Nygaardsvold (1935–1945)
- Gerhardsen's First Cabinet, the Norwegian government under Einar Gerhardsen (1945)
- Gerhardsen's Second Cabinet, the Norwegian government under Einar Gerhardsen (1945–1951)
- Torp's Cabinet, the Norwegian government under Oscar Torp (1951–1955)
- Gerhardsen's Third Cabinet, the Norwegian government under Einar Gerhardsen (1955–1963)
- Gerhardsen's Fourth Cabinet, the Norwegian government under Einar Gerhardsen (1963–1965)
- Bratteli's First Cabinet, the Norwegian government under Trygve Bratteli (1971–1972)
- Bratteli's Second Cabinet, the Norwegian government under Trygve Bratteli (1973–1976)
- Nordli's Cabinet, the Norwegian government under Odvar Nordli (1976–1981)
- Brundtland's First Cabinet, the Norwegian government under Gro Harlem Brundtland (1981)
- Brundtland's Second Cabinet, the Norwegian government under Gro Harlem Brundtland (1986–1989)
- Brundtland's Third Cabinet, the Norwegian government under Gro Harlem Brundtland (1990–1996)
- Jagland's Cabinet, the Norwegian government under Thorbjørn Jagland (1996–1997)
- Stoltenberg's First Cabinet, the Norwegian government under Jens Stoltenberg (2000–2001)
- Stoltenberg's Second Cabinet, the Norwegian government under Jens Stoltenberg (2005–2013)

== Singapore ==
In Singaporean politics, a Labour government may refer to the following governments administered the Labour Front:

- First David Marshall Cabinet, the Singaporean government under David Marshall (1955–1956)
- First Lim Yew Hock Cabinet, the Singaporean government under Lim Yew Hock (1956–1959)

== United Kingdom ==
In British politics, a Labour government may refer to the following governments administered by the Labour Party:

- First MacDonald ministry, the British government under Ramsay MacDonald (1924)
- Second MacDonald ministry, the British government under Ramsay MacDonald (1929–1931)
- Attlee ministry, the British government under Clement Attlee (1945–1951)
- Labour government, 1964–1970, the British government under Harold Wilson
- Labour government, 1974–1979, the British government under Harold Wilson and James Callaghan respectively
- First Blair ministry, the British government under Tony Blair (1997–2001)
- Second Blair ministry, the British government under Tony Blair (2001–2005)
- Third Blair ministry, the British government under Tony Blair (2005–2007)
- Brown ministry, the British government under Gordon Brown (2007–2010)
- Starmer ministry, the British government under Keir Starmer (2024–present)

== See also ==
- Labour Party leadership election
- List of Australian ministries
- List of British governments
- List of cabinets of the Netherlands
- List of Labour parties
- List of Maltese governments
- List of Norwegian governments
- List of New Zealand ministries
