= List of prime ministers of Australia =

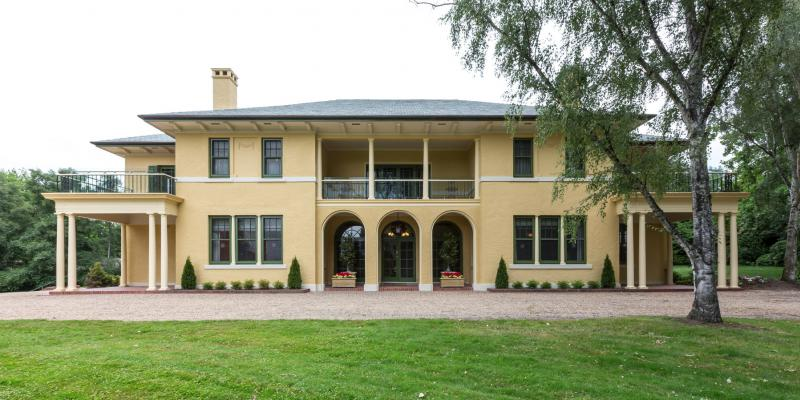
The Lodge, the official residence of the prime minister

The prime minister of Australia is the leader of the Australian Government and the Cabinet of Australia, with the support of the majority of the House of Representatives. Thirty-one people (thirty men and one woman) have served in the position since the office was created in 1901. The role of prime minister is not mentioned in the Constitution of Australia, but the prime minister is still appointed by the governor-general who under Section 64 of the constitution has the executive power to appoint ministers of state. The governor-general is appointed by the monarch of Australia based on the advice of the incumbent prime minister. Governors-general do not have fixed terms, but usually serve for five years.

Federal elections must be held every three years, although prime ministers may call elections early. Prime ministers do not have fixed terms, and generally serve the full length of their term unless they lose the majority of the House or are replaced as the leader of their party. Three former prime ministers lost a majority in the House (Alfred Deakin on two occasions, George Reid and Andrew Fisher), six resigned following leadership spills (John Gorton, Bob Hawke, Kevin Rudd, Julia Gillard, Tony Abbott and Malcolm Turnbull) and three died in office (Joseph Lyons, John Curtin and Harold Holt, who disappeared and is presumed to have died).

Two prime ministers also lost their role in a double dissolution election, a snap election where the entire Senate stands for re-election rather than the typical half to resolve deadlocks between the two houses. These were Joseph Cook in 1914 and Malcolm Fraser in 1983. One prime minister, Gough Whitlam, was dismissed by the governor-general during a constitutional crisis.

Since the office was established in 1901, thirty men and one woman have been prime minister. Robert Menzies and Kevin Rudd served two non-consecutive terms in office while Alfred Deakin and Andrew Fisher served three non-consecutive terms. The prime ministership of Frank Forde, who was prime minister for seven days in 1945, was the shortest in Australian history. Menzies served the longest, with eighteen years over two non-consecutive periods. The current prime minister is Anthony Albanese, who assumed office on 23 May 2022. There are currently seven living former prime ministers. The most recent former prime minister to die was Bob Hawke, on 16 May 2019.

== List of prime ministers ==
The parties shown are those to which the prime ministers belonged at the time they held office, and the electoral divisions shown are those they represented while in office. Several prime ministers belonged to parties other than those given and represented other electorates before and after their time in office.

=== Political parties ===
Australian Labor Party
Liberal Party of Australia
Australian Country Party
Nationalist Party
United Australia Party
Fusion Liberal Party
National Labor Party
Free Trade Party
Protectionist Party

List of prime ministers of Australia
No.	Portrait	Name (Birth–Death) Constituency	Term of office			Political party	Election (Parliament)	Ministry	Monarch(s)	Ref.
No.	Portrait	Name (Birth–Death) Constituency	Took office	Left office	Time in office	Political party	Election (Parliament)	Ministry	Monarch(s)	Ref.
1		Edmund Barton (1849–1920); MP for Hunter, NSW	1 January 1901	24 September 1903	2 years, 266 days	Protectionist	1901 (1st)	Barton	Victoria (Note: Represented by Lord Hopetoun.) r. 1837–1901	
1		Edmund Barton (1849–1920); MP for Hunter, NSW	1 January 1901	24 September 1903	2 years, 266 days	Protectionist	1901 (1st)	Barton	Edward VII (Note: Represented by Lord Hopetoun from 1901 to 1902, Lord Northcote from 1902 to 1904, and Lord Dudley from 1904 to 1910.) r. 1901–1910	
2		Alfred Deakin (1856–1919); MP for Ballaarat, Vic (Note: Ballarat was spelt Ballaarat until the 1973 election.)	24 September 1903	27 April 1904	216 days	Protectionist	— (1st)	Deakin I	Edward VII r. 1901–1910	
2		Alfred Deakin (1856–1919); MP for Ballaarat, Vic	24 September 1903	27 April 1904	216 days	Protectionist	1903 (2nd)	Deakin I	Edward VII r. 1901–1910	
3		Chris Watson (1867–1941); MP for Bland, NSW	27 April 1904	18 August 1904	113 days	Labor	— (2nd)	Watson	Edward VII r. 1901–1910	
4		George Reid (1845–1918); MP for East Sydney, NSW	18 August 1904	5 July 1905	321 days	Free Trade	— (2nd)	Reid	Edward VII r. 1901–1910	
(2)		Alfred Deakin (1856–1919); MP for Ballaarat, Vic	5 July 1905	13 November 1908	3 years, 131 days	Protectionist	— (2nd)	Deakin II	Edward VII r. 1901–1910	
(2)		Alfred Deakin (1856–1919); MP for Ballaarat, Vic	5 July 1905	13 November 1908	3 years, 131 days	Protectionist	1906 (3rd)	Deakin II	Edward VII r. 1901–1910	
5		Andrew Fisher (1862–1928); MP for Wide Bay, Qld	13 November 1908	2 June 1909	201 days	Labor	— (3rd)	Fisher I	Edward VII r. 1901–1910	
(2)		Alfred Deakin (1856–1919); MP for Ballaarat, Vic	2 June 1909	29 April 1910	331 days	Liberal	— (3rd)	Deakin III	Edward VII r. 1901–1910	
(5)		Andrew Fisher (1862–1928); MP for Wide Bay, Qld	29 April 1910	24 June 1913	3 years, 56 days	Labor	1910 (4th)	Fisher II	Edward VII r. 1901–1910	
(5)		Andrew Fisher (1862–1928); MP for Wide Bay, Qld	29 April 1910	24 June 1913	3 years, 56 days	Labor	1910 (4th)	Fisher II	George V (Note: Represented by Lord Dudley from 1910 to 1911, Lord Denman from 1911 to 1914, Ronald Munro Ferguson from 1914 to 1920, Lord Forster from 1920 to 1925, Lord Stonehaven from 1925 to 1930, and Isaac Isaacs from 1930 to 1936.) r. 1910–1936	
6		Joseph Cook (1860–1947); MP for Parramatta, NSW	24 June 1913	17 September 1914	1 year, 85 days	Liberal	1913 (5th)	Cook	George V r. 1910–1936	
(5)		Andrew Fisher (1862–1928); MP for Wide Bay, Qld	17 September 1914	27 October 1915	1 year, 40 days	Labor	1914 (6th)	Fisher III	George V r. 1910–1936	
7		Billy Hughes (1862–1952); MP for West Sydney, NSW (until 1917); MP for Bendigo, Vic (1917–22); MP for North Sydney, NSW (from 1922)	27 October 1915	9 February 1923	7 years, 105 days	Labor	— (6th)	Hughes I	George V r. 1910–1936	
7		Billy Hughes (1862–1952); MP for West Sydney, NSW (until 1917); MP for Bendigo, Vic (1917–22); MP for North Sydney, NSW (from 1922)	27 October 1915	9 February 1923	7 years, 105 days	National Labor	— (6th)	Hughes II	George V r. 1910–1936	
7		Billy Hughes (1862–1952); MP for West Sydney, NSW (until 1917); MP for Bendigo, Vic (1917–22); MP for North Sydney, NSW (from 1922)	27 October 1915	9 February 1923	7 years, 105 days	Nationalist	— (6th)	Hughes III	George V r. 1910–1936	
7		Billy Hughes (1862–1952); MP for West Sydney, NSW (until 1917); MP for Bendigo, Vic (1917–22); MP for North Sydney, NSW (from 1922)	27 October 1915	9 February 1923	7 years, 105 days	Nationalist	1917 (7th)	Hughes IV	George V r. 1910–1936	
7		Billy Hughes (1862–1952); MP for West Sydney, NSW (until 1917); MP for Bendigo, Vic (1917–22); MP for North Sydney, NSW (from 1922)	27 October 1915	9 February 1923	7 years, 105 days	Nationalist	1919 (8th)	Hughes V	George V r. 1910–1936	
8		Stanley Bruce (1883–1967); MP for Flinders, Vic	9 February 1923	22 October 1929	6 years, 255 days	Nationalist (Coalition)	1922 (9th)	Bruce I	George V r. 1910–1936	
8		Stanley Bruce (1883–1967); MP for Flinders, Vic	9 February 1923	22 October 1929	6 years, 255 days	Nationalist (Coalition)	1925 (10th)	Bruce II	George V r. 1910–1936	
8		Stanley Bruce (1883–1967); MP for Flinders, Vic	9 February 1923	22 October 1929	6 years, 255 days	Nationalist (Coalition)	1928 (11th)	Bruce III	George V r. 1910–1936	
9		James Scullin (1876–1953); MP for Yarra, Vic	22 October 1929	6 January 1932	2 years, 76 days	Labor	1929 (12th)	Scullin	George V r. 1910–1936	
10		Joseph Lyons (1879–1939); MP for Wilmot, Tas	6 January 1932	7 April 1939 #	7 years, 91 days	United Australia	1931 (13th)	Lyons I	George V r. 1910–1936	
10		Joseph Lyons (1879–1939); MP for Wilmot, Tas	6 January 1932	7 April 1939 #	7 years, 91 days	United Australia	1934 (14th)	Lyons II	George V r. 1910–1936	
10		Joseph Lyons (1879–1939); MP for Wilmot, Tas	6 January 1932	7 April 1939 #	7 years, 91 days	United Australia (Coalition)	— (14th)	Lyons III	Edward VIII (Note: Represented by Isaac Isaacs in January 1936 and by Lord Gowrie from January to December 1936.) r. 1936	
10		Joseph Lyons (1879–1939); MP for Wilmot, Tas	6 January 1932	7 April 1939 #	7 years, 91 days	United Australia (Coalition)	— (14th)	Lyons III	George VI (Note: Represented by Lord Gowrie from 1936 to 1945, Prince Henry, Duke of Gloucester from 1945 to 1947, and William McKell from 1947 to 1952.) r. 1936–1952	
10		Joseph Lyons (1879–1939); MP for Wilmot, Tas	6 January 1932	7 April 1939 #	7 years, 91 days	United Australia (Coalition)	1937 (15th)	Lyons IV	George VI r. 1936–1952	
11		Earle Page (1880–1961); MP for Cowper, NSW	7 April 1939	26 April 1939	19 days	Country (Coalition)	— (15th)	Page	George VI r. 1936–1952	
12		Robert Menzies (1894–1978); MP for Kooyong, Vic	26 April 1939	29 August 1941	2 years, 125 days	United Australia	— (15th)	Menzies I	George VI r. 1936–1952	
12		Robert Menzies (1894–1978); MP for Kooyong, Vic	26 April 1939	29 August 1941	2 years, 125 days	United Australia (Coalition)	— (15th)	Menzies II	George VI r. 1936–1952	
12		Robert Menzies (1894–1978); MP for Kooyong, Vic	26 April 1939	29 August 1941	2 years, 125 days	United Australia (Coalition)	1940 (16th)	Menzies III	George VI r. 1936–1952	
13		Arthur Fadden (1894–1973); MP for Darling Downs, Qld	29 August 1941	7 October 1941	39 days	Country (Coalition)	— (16th)	Fadden	George VI r. 1936–1952	
14		John Curtin (1885–1945); MP for Fremantle, WA	7 October 1941	5 July 1945 #	3 years, 271 days	Labor	— (16th)	Curtin I	George VI r. 1936–1952	
14		John Curtin (1885–1945); MP for Fremantle, WA	7 October 1941	5 July 1945 #	3 years, 271 days	Labor	1943 (17th)	Curtin II	George VI r. 1936–1952	
15		Frank Forde (1890–1983); MP for Capricornia, Qld	5 July 1945	13 July 1945	7 days	Labor	— (17th)	Forde	George VI r. 1936–1952	
16		Ben Chifley (1885–1951); MP for Macquarie, NSW	13 July 1945	19 December 1949	4 years, 159 days	Labor	— (17th)	Chifley I	George VI r. 1936–1952	
16		Ben Chifley (1885–1951); MP for Macquarie, NSW	13 July 1945	19 December 1949	4 years, 159 days	Labor	1946 (18th)	Chifley II	George VI r. 1936–1952	
(12)		Robert Menzies (1894–1978); MP for Kooyong, Vic	19 December 1949	26 January 1966	16 years, 38 days	Liberal (Coalition)	1949 (19th)	Menzies IV	George VI r. 1936–1952	
(12)		Robert Menzies (1894–1978); MP for Kooyong, Vic	19 December 1949	26 January 1966	16 years, 38 days	Liberal (Coalition)	1951 (20th)	Menzies V	George VI r. 1936–1952	
(12)		Robert Menzies (1894–1978); MP for Kooyong, Vic	19 December 1949	26 January 1966	16 years, 38 days	Liberal (Coalition)	1951 (20th)	Menzies V	Elizabeth II (Note: Represented by William McKell from 1952 to 1953, Lord Slim from 1953 to 1960, Lord Dunrossil from 1960 to 1961, Lord De L'Isle from 1961 to 1965, Lord Casey from 1965 to 1969, Paul Hasluck from 1969 to 1974, John Kerr from 1974 to 1977, Zelman Cowen from 1977 to 1982, Ninian Stephen from 1982 to 1989, Bill Hayden from 1989 to 1996, William Deane from 1996 to 2001, Peter Hollingworth from 2001 to 2003, Michael Jeffery from 2003 to 2008, Quentin Bryce from 2008 to 2014, Peter Cosgrove from 2014 to 2019, and David Hurley from 2019 to 2022.) r. 1952–2022	
(12)		Robert Menzies (1894–1978); MP for Kooyong, Vic	19 December 1949	26 January 1966	16 years, 38 days	Liberal (Coalition)	1954 (21st)	Menzies VI	Elizabeth II r. 1952–2022	
(12)		Robert Menzies (1894–1978); MP for Kooyong, Vic	19 December 1949	26 January 1966	16 years, 38 days	Liberal (Coalition)	1955 (22nd)	Menzies VII	Elizabeth II r. 1952–2022	
(12)		Robert Menzies (1894–1978); MP for Kooyong, Vic	19 December 1949	26 January 1966	16 years, 38 days	Liberal (Coalition)	1958 (23rd)	Menzies VIII	Elizabeth II r. 1952–2022	
(12)		Robert Menzies (1894–1978); MP for Kooyong, Vic	19 December 1949	26 January 1966	16 years, 38 days	Liberal (Coalition)	1961 (24th)	Menzies IX	Elizabeth II r. 1952–2022	
(12)		Robert Menzies (1894–1978); MP for Kooyong, Vic	19 December 1949	26 January 1966	16 years, 38 days	Liberal (Coalition)	1963 (25th)	Menzies X	Elizabeth II r. 1952–2022	
17		Harold Holt (1908–1967); MP for Higgins, Vic	26 January 1966	17 December 1967 ‽	1 year, 327 days	Liberal (Coalition)	— (25th)	Holt I	Elizabeth II r. 1952–2022	
17		Harold Holt (1908–1967); MP for Higgins, Vic	26 January 1966	17 December 1967 ‽	1 year, 327 days	Liberal (Coalition)	1966 (26th)	Holt II	Elizabeth II r. 1952–2022	
18		John McEwen (1900–1980); MP for Murray, Vic	19 December 1967	10 January 1968	22 days	Country (Coalition)	— (26th)	McEwen	Elizabeth II r. 1952–2022	
19		John Gorton (1911–2002); MP for Higgins, Vic (Note: Gorton was a Senator until he resigned from the Senate on 1 February 1968; he was elected to the House of Representatives at the Higgins by-election on 24 February 1968.)	10 January 1968	10 March 1971	3 years, 59 days	Liberal (Coalition)	— (26th)	Gorton I	Elizabeth II r. 1952–2022	
19		John Gorton (1911–2002); MP for Higgins, Vic	10 January 1968	10 March 1971	3 years, 59 days	Liberal (Coalition)	1969 (27th)	Gorton II	Elizabeth II r. 1952–2022	
20		William McMahon (1908–1988); MP for Lowe, NSW	10 March 1971	5 December 1972	1 year, 270 days	Liberal (Coalition)	— (27th)	McMahon	Elizabeth II r. 1952–2022	
21		Gough Whitlam (1916–2014); MP for Werriwa, NSW	5 December 1972	11 November 1975	2 years, 341 days	Labor	1972 (28th)	Whitlam I	Elizabeth II r. 1952–2022	
21		Gough Whitlam (1916–2014); MP for Werriwa, NSW	5 December 1972	11 November 1975	2 years, 341 days	Labor	— (28th)	Whitlam II	Elizabeth II r. 1952–2022	
21		Gough Whitlam (1916–2014); MP for Werriwa, NSW	5 December 1972	11 November 1975	2 years, 341 days	Labor	1974 (29th)	Whitlam III	Elizabeth II r. 1952–2022	
22		Malcolm Fraser (1930–2015); MP for Wannon, Vic	11 November 1975	11 March 1983	7 years, 120 days	Liberal (Coalition)	— (29th)	Fraser I	Elizabeth II r. 1952–2022	
22		Malcolm Fraser (1930–2015); MP for Wannon, Vic	11 November 1975	11 March 1983	7 years, 120 days	Liberal (Coalition)	1975 (30th)	Fraser II	Elizabeth II r. 1952–2022	
22		Malcolm Fraser (1930–2015); MP for Wannon, Vic	11 November 1975	11 March 1983	7 years, 120 days	Liberal (Coalition)	1977 (31st)	Fraser III	Elizabeth II r. 1952–2022	
22		Malcolm Fraser (1930–2015); MP for Wannon, Vic	11 November 1975	11 March 1983	7 years, 120 days	Liberal (Coalition)	1980 (32nd)	Fraser IV	Elizabeth II r. 1952–2022	
23	Hawke_Bob_BANNER	Bob Hawke (1929–2019); MP for Wills, Vic	11 March 1983	20 December 1991	8 years, 284 days	Labor	1983 (33rd)	Hawke I	Elizabeth II r. 1952–2022	
23	Hawke_Bob_BANNER	Bob Hawke (1929–2019); MP for Wills, Vic	11 March 1983	20 December 1991	8 years, 284 days	Labor	1984 (34th)	Hawke II	Elizabeth II r. 1952–2022	
23	Hawke_Bob_BANNER	Bob Hawke (1929–2019); MP for Wills, Vic	11 March 1983	20 December 1991	8 years, 284 days	Labor	1987 (35th)	Hawke III	Elizabeth II r. 1952–2022	
23	Hawke_Bob_BANNER	Bob Hawke (1929–2019); MP for Wills, Vic	11 March 1983	20 December 1991	8 years, 284 days	Labor	1990 (36th)	Hawke IV	Elizabeth II r. 1952–2022	
24		Paul Keating (b. 1944); MP for Blaxland, NSW	20 December 1991	11 March 1996	4 years, 82 days	Labor	— (36th)	Keating I	Elizabeth II r. 1952–2022	
24		Paul Keating (b. 1944); MP for Blaxland, NSW	20 December 1991	11 March 1996	4 years, 82 days	Labor	1993 (37th)	Keating II	Elizabeth II r. 1952–2022	
25		John Howard (b. 1939); MP for Bennelong, NSW	11 March 1996	3 December 2007	11 years, 267 days	Liberal (Coalition)	1996 (38th)	Howard I	Elizabeth II r. 1952–2022	
25		John Howard (b. 1939); MP for Bennelong, NSW	11 March 1996	3 December 2007	11 years, 267 days	Liberal (Coalition)	1998 (39th)	Howard II	Elizabeth II r. 1952–2022	
25		John Howard (b. 1939); MP for Bennelong, NSW	11 March 1996	3 December 2007	11 years, 267 days	Liberal (Coalition)	2001 (40th)	Howard III	Elizabeth II r. 1952–2022	
25		John Howard (b. 1939); MP for Bennelong, NSW	11 March 1996	3 December 2007	11 years, 267 days	Liberal (Coalition)	2004 (41st)	Howard IV	Elizabeth II r. 1952–2022	
26		Kevin Rudd (b. 1957); MP for Griffith, Qld	3 December 2007	24 June 2010	2 years, 203 days	Labor	2007 (42nd)	Rudd I	Elizabeth II r. 1952–2022	
27		Julia Gillard (b. 1961); MP for Lalor, Vic	24 June 2010	27 June 2013	3 years, 3 days	Labor	— (42nd)	Gillard I	Elizabeth II r. 1952–2022	
27		Julia Gillard (b. 1961); MP for Lalor, Vic	24 June 2010	27 June 2013	3 years, 3 days	Labor	2010 (43rd)	Gillard II	Elizabeth II r. 1952–2022	
(26)		Kevin Rudd (b. 1957); MP for Griffith, Qld	27 June 2013	18 September 2013	83 days	Labor	— (43rd)	Rudd II	Elizabeth II r. 1952–2022	
28		Tony Abbott (b. 1957); MP for Warringah, NSW	18 September 2013	15 September 2015	1 year, 362 days	Liberal (Coalition)	2013 (44th)	Abbott	Elizabeth II r. 1952–2022	
29		Malcolm Turnbull (b. 1954); MP for Wentworth, NSW	15 September 2015	24 August 2018	2 years, 343 days	Liberal (Coalition)	— (44th)	Turnbull I	Elizabeth II r. 1952–2022	
29		Malcolm Turnbull (b. 1954); MP for Wentworth, NSW	15 September 2015	24 August 2018	2 years, 343 days	Liberal (Coalition)	2016 (45th)	Turnbull II	Elizabeth II r. 1952–2022	
30		Scott Morrison (b. 1968); MP for Cook, NSW	24 August 2018	23 May 2022	3 years, 272 days	Liberal (Coalition)	— (45th)	Morrison I	Elizabeth II r. 1952–2022	
30		Scott Morrison (b. 1968); MP for Cook, NSW	24 August 2018	23 May 2022	3 years, 272 days	Liberal (Coalition)	2019 (46th)	Morrison II	Elizabeth II r. 1952–2022	
31		Anthony Albanese (b. 1963); MP for Grayndler, NSW	23 May 2022	Incumbent	4 years, 99 days (Note: As of 30 August 2026)	Labor	2022 (47th)	Albanese I	Elizabeth II r. 1952–2022	
31		Anthony Albanese (b. 1963); MP for Grayndler, NSW	23 May 2022	Incumbent	4 years, 99 days	Labor	2025 (48th)	Albanese II	Charles III (Note: Represented by David Hurley from 2022 to 2024, and by Sam Mostyn since 2024.) r. 2022–present	

== Career-based timeline ==
This timeline below shows most of the early life, the political career and death of each prime minister from 1901. The first prime minister was Edmund Barton in the early 20th century.

=== Key ===
- Each dark coloured bar denotes the time spent as prime minister
- A light colour denotes time spent in Parliament before or after serving as prime minister
- A grey colour bar denotes the time the prime minister spent outside Parliament, either before or after their political career

=== Notable moments ===
- changed party: Cook (pre-office), Watson (post-office), Hughes (in office and post-office), Lyons (pre-office)
- died in office: Lyons, Curtin, Holt
- died shortly after leaving office: Chifley
- left Parliament on leaving office: Barton, Bruce, Menzies, Fraser, Hawke, Keating, Howard, Gillard, Turnbull
- long career after being prime minister: Cook, Hughes, Scullin, Page, Fadden, McMahon
- was prime minister after an interruption to their service in Parliament: Scullin, Curtin, Chifley
- lived for more than twenty years after leaving Parliament: Watson, Cook, Bruce, Forde, Gorton, Whitlam, Fraser, Hawke, Keating
- former prime minister still living: Keating, Howard, Rudd, Gillard, Abbott, Turnbull, Morrison

== See also ==
- History of Australia
- List of prime ministers of Australia by birthplace
- List of prime ministers of Australia by time in office
- Politics of Australia
- Spouse of the prime minister of Australia
