= First Curtin ministry =

29th ministry of the government of Australia

- 29th Ministry of Australia

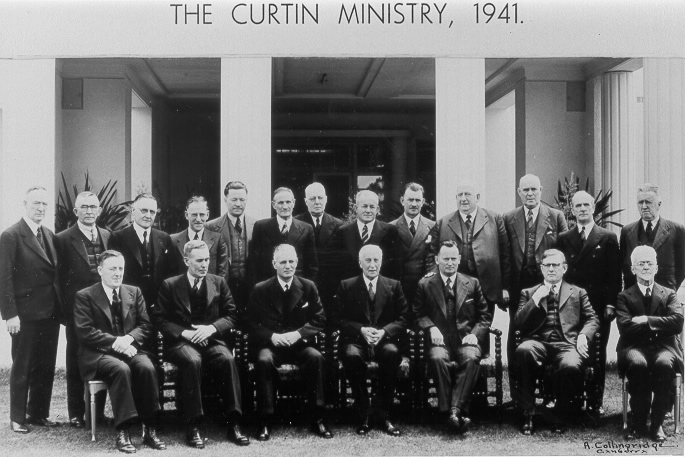
- Group photo of the First Curtin ministry
- Date formed: 7 October 1941
- Date dissolved: 21 September 1943

People and organisations
- Monarch: George VI
- Governor-General: Lord Gowrie
- Prime Minister: John Curtin
- No. of ministers: 19
- Member party: Labor
- Status in legislature: Minority government
- Opposition party: Country–United Australia coalition
- Opposition leader: Arthur Fadden

History
- Outgoing election: 21 August 1943
- Legislature term: 16th
- Predecessor: Fadden ministry
- Successor: Second Curtin ministry

The First Curtin ministry (Labor) was the 29th ministry of the Government of Australia. It was led by the country's 14th Prime Minister, John Curtin. The First Curtin ministry succeeded the Fadden ministry, which dissolved on 7 October 1941 after the independent crossbenchers Alexander Wilson and Arthur Coles withdrew their support for the Fadden government. The ministry was replaced by the Second Curtin ministry on 21 September 1943 following the 1943 federal election.

Frank Forde, who died in 1983, was the last surviving member of the First Curtin ministry; Forde was also the last surviving minister of the Scullin government, Second Curtin ministry, Forde government, and the First Chifley ministry.

== Ministry ==
Party	Minister	Portrait	Portfolio
Labor	John Curtin (1885–1945) MP for Fremantle (1934–1945)		Prime Minister; Leader of the Labor Party; Minister for Defence Co-ordination (to 14 April 1942); Minister for Defence (from 14 April 1942)
Labor	Frank Forde (1890–1983) MP for Capricornia (1922–1946)		Deputy Leader of the Labor Party; Minister for the Army
Labor	Ben Chifley (1885–1951) MP for Macquarie (1940–1951)		Treasurer; Minister for Postwar Reconstruction (from 22 December 1942)
Labor	H. V. Evatt (1894–1965) MP for Barton (1940–1958)		Attorney-General; Minister for External Affairs
Labor	Jack Beasley (1895–1949) MP for West Sydney (1928–1946)		Minister for Supply and Development (to 17 October 1942); Minister for Supply and Shipping (from 17 October 1942)
Labor	Joe Collings (1865–1955) Senator for Queensland (1932–1950)		Minister for the Interior; Leader of the Government in the Senate (to 20 September 1943)
Labor	Norman Makin (1889–1982) MP for Hindmarsh (1919–1946)		Minister for the Navy; Minister for Munitions
Labor	Jack Holloway (1875–1967) MP for Melbourne Ports (1931–1951)		Minister for Health; Minister for Social Services; Minister assisting the Minister for Munitions (from 21 February 1942)
Labor	Richard Keane (1881–1946) Senator for Victoria (1938–1946)		Minister for Trade and Customs; Vice-President of the Executive Council; Leader of the Government in the Senate (from 20 September 1943)
Labor	Arthur Drakeford (1878–1957) MP for Maribyrnong (1934–1955)		Minister for Air; Minister for Civil Aviation
Labor	William Scully (1883–1966) MP for Gwydir (1937–1949)		Minister for Commerce (to 22 December 1942); Minister for Commerce and Agriculture (from 22 December 1942)
Labor	Bill Ashley (1881–1958) Senator for New South Wales (1937–1958)		Postmaster-General; Minister for Information
Labor	Eddie Ward (1899–1963) MP for East Sydney (1932–1963)		Minister for Labour and National Service
Labor	George Lawson (1880–1966) MP for Brisbane (1931–1961)		Minister for Transport; Minister assisting the Postmaster-General
Labor	Charles Frost (1882–1964) MP for Franklin (1934–1946)		Minister for Repatriation; Minister in charge of War Service Homes
Labor	John Dedman (1896–1973) MP for Corio (1940–1949)		Minister for War Organisation of Industry; Minister in charge of the Council for Scientific and Industrial Research
Labor	Bert Lazzarini (1884–1952) MP for Werriwa (1934–1952)		Minister for Home Security; Minister assisting the Treasurer
Labor	James Fraser (1889–1961) Senator for Western Australia (1938–1959)		Minister for External Territories; Minister assisting the Minister for Commerce (to 17 October 1942); Minister assisting the Minister for the Army (from 21 February 1942); Minister assisting the Minister for Supply and Shipping (from 17 October 1942)
Labor	Don Cameron (1878–1962) Senator for Victoria (1938–1962)		Minister for Aircraft Production; Minister assisting the Minister for Munitions (to 21 February 1942)
