= Chifley Ministry =

Chifley Ministry may refer to:

- First Chifley Ministry
- Second Chifley Ministry
