= Curtin Ministry =

Curtin Ministry may refer to:

- First Curtin Ministry
- Second Curtin Ministry
