= Forde ministry =

- 31st Ministry of Australia

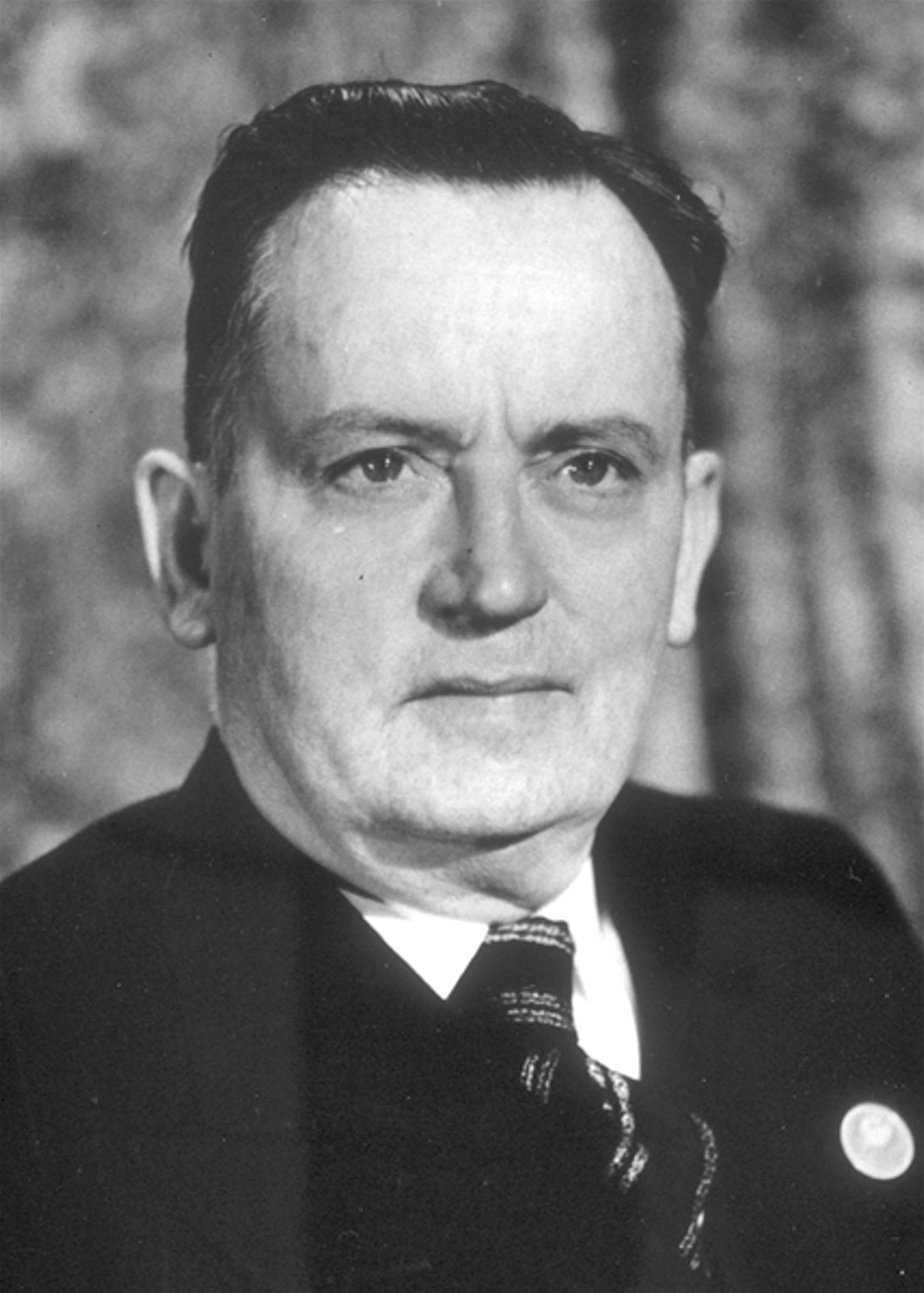
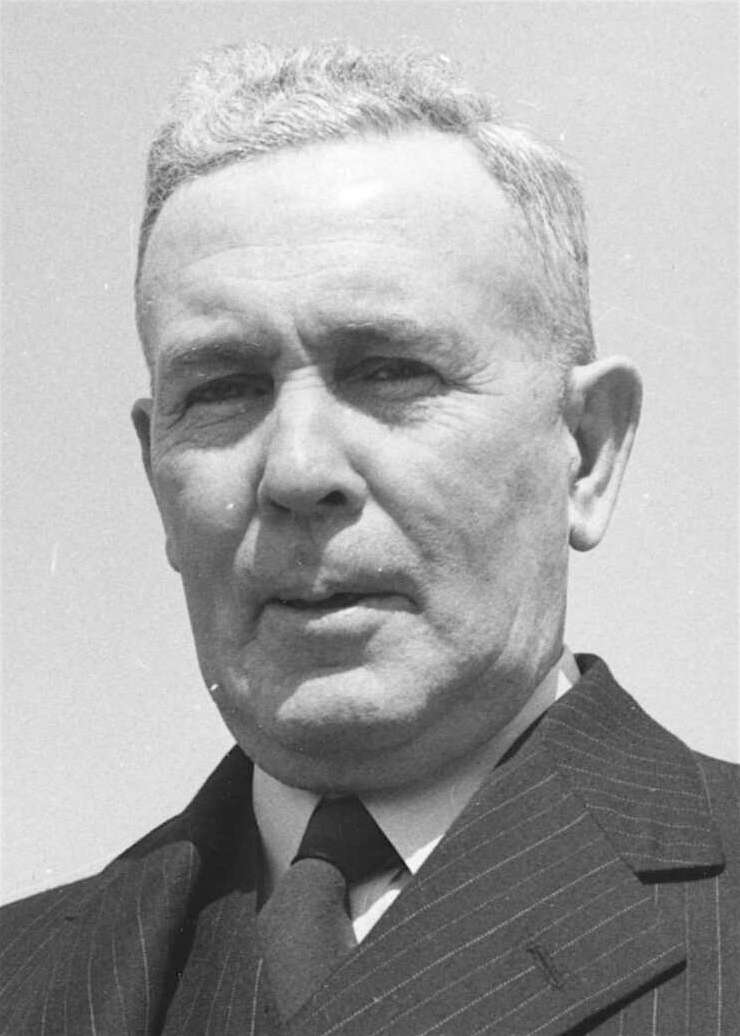
- Frank Forde Ben Chifley
- Date formed: 6 July 1945
- Date dissolved: 13 July 1945

People and organisations
- Monarch: George VI
- Governor-General: Prince Henry, Duke of Gloucester
- Prime Minister: Frank Forde
- No. of ministers: 18
- Member party: Labor
- Status in legislature: Majority government
- Opposition party: Liberal–Country coalition
- Opposition leader: Robert Menzies

History
- Legislature term: 17th
- Predecessor: Second Curtin ministry
- Successor: First Chifley ministry

The Forde ministry (Labor) was the 31st ministry of the Government of Australia. It was led by the country's 15th prime minister, Frank Forde. The Forde Ministry succeeded the Second Curtin ministry, which dissolved on 6 July 1945 following the death of former prime minister John Curtin - the second of three occasions where a sitting prime minister died in office. Since Forde was the deputy Labor leader, it was a caretaker ministry until the Labor caucus could elect a new leader. Treasurer Ben Chifley was ultimately elected over Forde on 12 July 1945, and he was sworn in as prime minister along with his ministry the following day.

Frank Forde, who died in 1983, was the last surviving member of the Forde Ministry; Forde was also the last surviving minister of the Scullin government, the Curtin government, and the First Chifley ministry.

== Ministry ==
Party	Minister	Portrait	Portfolio
Labor	Frank Forde (1890–1983) MP for Capricornia (1922–1946)		Prime Minister; Deputy Leader of the Labor Party; Minister for the Army
Labor	Ben Chifley (1885–1951) MP for Macquarie (1940–1951)		Leader of the Labor Party (from 12 July 1945); Treasurer
Labor	H. V. Evatt (1894–1965) MP for Barton (1940–1958)		Attorney-General; Minister for External Affairs
Labor	Jack Beasley (1895–1949) MP for West Sydney (1928–1946)		Vice-President of the Executive Council; Minister for Defence
Labor	Norman Makin (1889–1982) MP for Hindmarsh (1919–1946)		Minister for the Navy; Minister for Munitions; Minister for Aircraft Production
Labor	Richard Keane (1881–1946) Senator for Victoria (1938–1946)		Minister for Trade and Customs; Leader of the Government in the Senate
Labor	Jack Holloway (1875–1967) MP for Melbourne Ports (1931–1951)		Minister for Labour and National Service
Labor	Arthur Drakeford (1878–1957) MP for Maribyrnong (1934–1955)		Minister for Air; Minister for Civil Aviation
Labor	William Scully (1883–1966) MP for Gwydir (1937–1949)		Minister for Commerce and Agriculture
Labor	Bill Ashley (1881–1958) Senator for New South Wales (1937–1958)		Minister for Supply and Shipping
Labor	John Dedman (1896–1973) MP for Corio (1940–1949)		Minister in charge of the Council for Scientific and Industrial Research; Minister for Postwar Reconstruction
Labor	Joe Collings (1865–1955) Senator for Queensland (1932–1950)		Minister for the Interior
Labor	Eddie Ward (1899–1963) MP for East Sydney (1932–1963)		Minister for Transport; Minister for External Territories
Labor	James Fraser (1889–1961) Senator for Western Australia (1938–1959)		Minister for Health; Minister for Social Services
Labor	Charles Frost (1882–1964) MP for Franklin (1934–1946)		Minister for Repatriation; Minister in charge of War Service Homes
Labor	Bert Lazzarini (1884–1952) MP for Werriwa (1934–1952)		Minister for Home Security; Minister for Works
Labor	Don Cameron (1878–1962) Senator for Victoria (1938–1962)		Postmaster-General
Labor	Arthur Calwell (1896–1973) MP for Melbourne (1940–1972)		Minister for Information
