= Second Curtin ministry =

30th ministry of government of Australia

- 30th Ministry of Australia

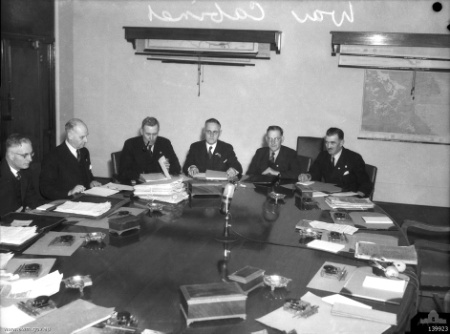
- Group photo of members of the Second Curtin ministry
- Date formed: 21 September 1943
- Date dissolved: 6 July 1945

People and organisations
- Monarch: George VI
- Governor-General: Lord Gowrie; Prince Henry, Duke of Gloucester
- Prime Minister: John Curtin
- No. of ministers: 19
- Member party: Labor
- Status in legislature: Majority government
- Opposition party: United Australia/Liberal–Country coalition
- Opposition leader: Arthur Fadden; Robert Menzies

History
- Election: 21 August 1943
- Legislature term: 17th
- Predecessor: First Curtin ministry
- Successor: Forde ministry

The Second Curtin ministry (Labor) was the 30th ministry of the Government of Australia. It was led by the country's 14th prime minister, John Curtin. The Second Curtin ministry succeeded the First Curtin ministry, which dissolved on 21 September 1943 following the federal election that took place in August. The ministry was replaced by the Forde ministry on 6 July 1945 following the death of Curtin – the second of three occasions where a sitting prime minister died in office.

Frank Forde, who died in 1983, was the last surviving member of the Second Curtin ministry; Forde was also the last surviving minister of the Scullin government, First Curtin ministry, Forde government, and the First Chifley ministry.

== Ministry ==
Party	Minister	Portrait	Portfolio
Labor	John Curtin (1885–1945) MP for Fremantle (1934–1945)		Prime Minister; Leader of the Labor Party; Minister for Defence
Labor	Frank Forde (1890–1983) MP for Capricornia (1922–1946)		Deputy Leader of the Labor Party; Minister for the Army
Labor	Ben Chifley (1885–1951) MP for Macquarie (1940–1951)		Treasurer; Minister for Postwar Reconstruction (to 2 February 1945)
Labor	H. V. Evatt (1894–1965) MP for Barton (1940–1958)		Attorney-General; Minister for External Affairs
Labor	Jack Beasley (1895–1949) MP for West Sydney (1928–1946)		Minister for Supply and Shipping (to 2 February 1945); Vice-President of the Executive Council (from 2 February 1945)
Labor	Norman Makin (1889–1982) MP for Hindmarsh (1919–1946)		Minister for the Navy; Minister for Munitions; Minister for Aircraft Production (from 2 February 1945)
Labor	Richard Keane (1881–1946) Senator for Victoria (1938–1946)		Minister for Trade and Customs; Leader of the Government in the Senate
Labor	Jack Holloway (1875–1967) MP for Melbourne Ports (1931–1951)		Minister for Labour and National Service
Labor	Arthur Drakeford (1878–1957) MP for Maribyrnong (1934–1955)		Minister for Air; Minister for Civil Aviation
Labor	William Scully (1883–1966) MP for Gwydir (1937–1949)		Minister for Commerce and Agriculture
Labor	Bill Ashley (1881–1958) Senator for New South Wales (1937–1958)		Postmaster-General (to 2 February 1945); Vice-President of the Executive Council (to 2 February 1945); Minister for Supply and Shipping (from 2 February 1945)
Labor	John Dedman (1896–1973) MP for Corio (1940–1949)		Minister in charge of the Council for Scientific and Industrial Research; Minister for War Organisation (to 19 February 1945); Minister for Postwar Reconstruction (from 2 February 1945)
Labor	Joe Collings (1865–1955) Senator for Queensland (1932–1950)		Minister for the Interior
Labor	Eddie Ward (1899–1963) MP for East Sydney (1932–1963)		Minister for Transport; Minister for External Territories
Labor	James Fraser (1889–1961) Senator for Western Australia (1938–1959)		Minister for Health; Minister for Social Services
Labor	Charles Frost (1882–1964) MP for Franklin (1934–1946)		Minister for Repatriation; Minister in charge of War Service Homes
Labor	Bert Lazzarini (1884–1952) MP for Werriwa (1934–1952)		Minister for Home Security; Minister for Works (from 2 February 1945)
Labor	Don Cameron (1878–1962) Senator for Victoria (1938–1962)		Minister for Aircraft Production (to 2 February 1945); Postmaster-General (from 2 February 1945)
Labor	Arthur Calwell (1896–1973) MP for Melbourne (1940–1972)		Minister for Information

== See also ==
- First Curtin Ministry
