= Second Chifley ministry =

33rd ministry of government of Australia

- 33rd Ministry of Australia

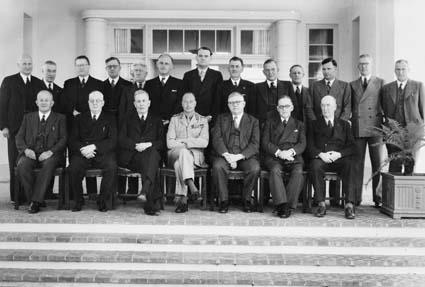
- Group photo of the Second Chifley ministry.
- Date formed: 1 November 1946
- Date dissolved: 19 December 1949

People and organisations
- Monarch: George VI
- Governor-General: Prince Henry, Duke of Gloucester; William McKell
- Prime Minister: Ben Chifley
- No. of ministers: 19
- Member party: Labor
- Status in legislature: Majority government
- Opposition party: Liberal–Country coalition
- Opposition leader: Robert Menzies

History
- Election: 28 September 1946
- Outgoing election: 10 December 1949
- Legislature term: 18th
- Predecessor: First Chifley ministry
- Successor: Fourth Menzies ministry

The Second Chifley ministry (Labor) was the 33rd ministry of the Government of Australia. It was led by the country's 16th Prime Minister, Ben Chifley. The Second Chifley Ministry succeeded the First Chifley ministry, which dissolved on 1 November 1946 following the federal election that took place in September. The ministry was replaced by the Fourth Menzies ministry on 19 December 1949 following the federal election that took place on 10 December which saw the Liberal–Country Coalition defeat Labor.

Nelson Lemmon, who died in 1989, was the last surviving member of the Second Chifley Ministry.

== Ministry ==
Party	Minister	Portrait	Portfolio
Labor	Ben Chifley (1885–1951) MP for Macquarie (1940–1951)		Prime Minister; Leader of the Labor Party; Treasurer
Labor	H. V. Evatt (1894–1965) MP for Barton (1940–1958)		Deputy Leader of the Labor Party; Attorney-General; Minister for External Affairs
Labor	Jack Holloway (1875–1967) MP for Melbourne Ports (1931–1951)		Minister for Labour and National Service
Labor	Arthur Drakeford (1878–1957) MP for Maribyrnong (1934–1955)		Minister for Air; Minister for Civil Aviation
Labor	William Scully (1883–1966) MP for Gwydir (1937–1949)		Vice-President of the Executive Council
Labor	Bill Ashley (1881–1958) Senator for New South Wales (1937–1958)		Minister for Supply and Shipping (to 6 April 1948); Minister for Shipping and Fuel (from 6 April 1948); Leader of the Government in the Senate
Labor	John Dedman (1896–1973) MP for Corio (1940–1949)		Minister for Defence; Minister for Postwar Reconstruction; Minister in charge of the Council for Scientific and Industrial Research
Labor	Eddie Ward (1899–1963) MP for East Sydney (1932–1963)		Minister for Transport; Minister for External Territories
Labor	Don Cameron (1878–1962) Senator for Victoria (1938–1962)		Postmaster-General
Labor	Arthur Calwell (1896–1973) MP for Melbourne (1940–1972)		Minister for Information; Minister for Immigration
Labor	Herbert Johnson (1889–1962) MP for Kalgoorlie (1940–1958)		Minister for the Interior
Labor	Nick McKenna (1895–1974) Senator for Tasmania (1944–1968)		Minister for Health; Minister for Social Services
Labor	Reg Pollard (1894–1981) MP for Ballaarat (1937–1949)		Minister for Commerce and Agriculture
Labor	Nelson Lemmon (1908–1989) MP for Forrest (1943–1949)		Minister for Works and Housing
Labor	John Armstrong (1908–1977) Senator for New South Wales (1938–1962)		Minister for Munitions (to 6 April 1948); Minister for Supply and Development (from 6 April 1948)
Labor	Cyril Chambers (1898–1975) MP for Adelaide (1943–1958)		Minister for the Army
Labor	Ben Courtice (1881–1972) Senator for Queensland (1937–1962)		Minister for Trade and Customs
Labor	Bill Riordan (1908–1973) MP for Kennedy (1936–1966)		Minister for the Navy
Labor	Claude Barnard (1890–1957) MP for Bass (1934–1949)		Minister for Repatriation
