= List of Australian ministries =

450 law

This is a list of ministries of the Government of Australia since Federation in 1901.

== Ministries ==
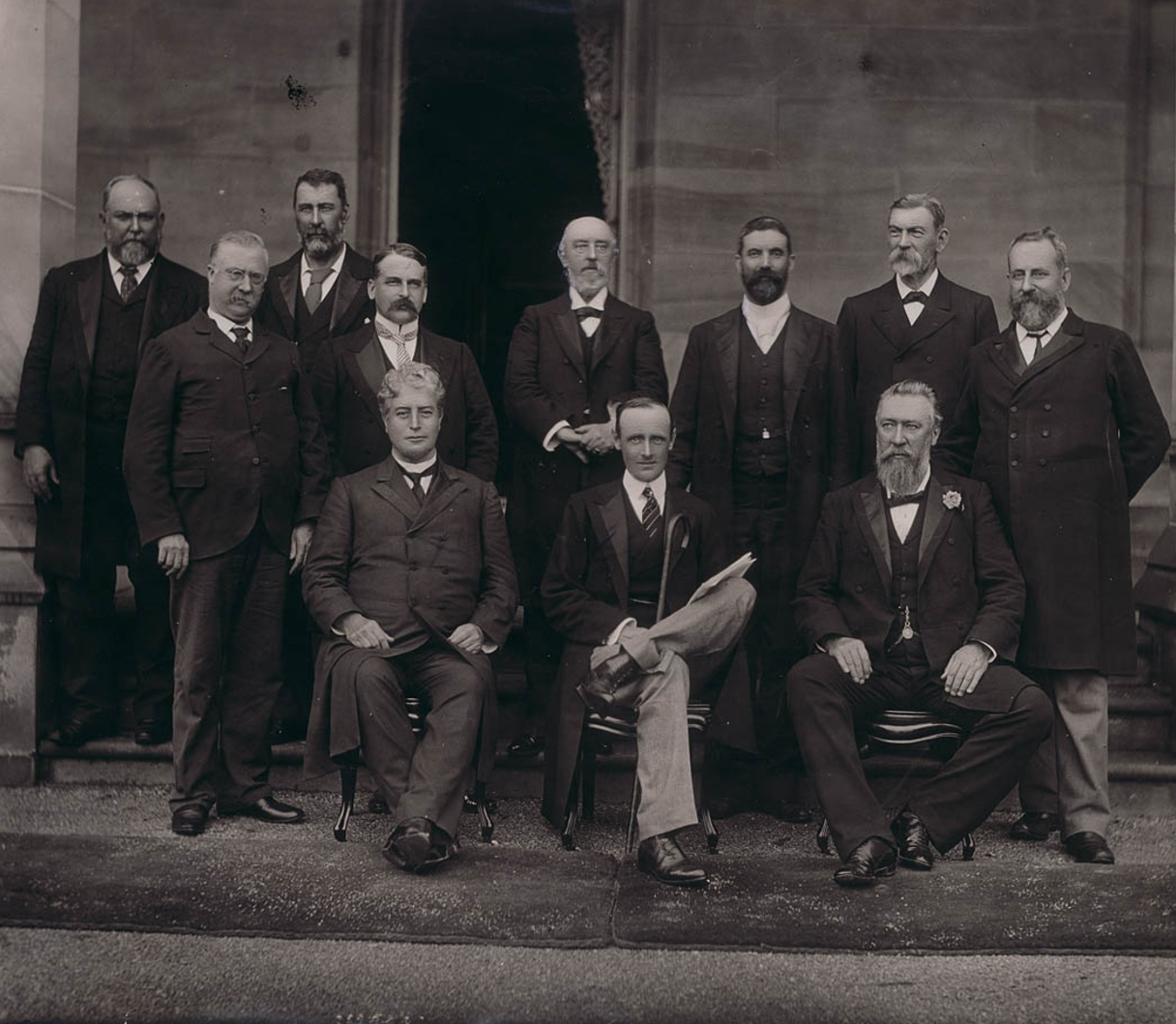
The Barton ministry; the 1st Australian federal ministry, 1901.

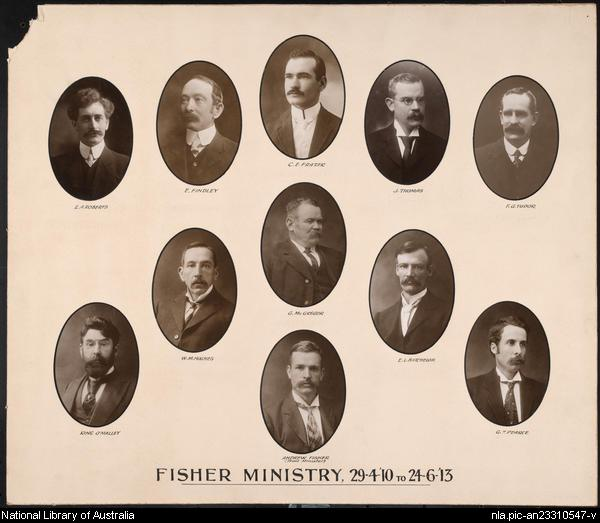
The Second Fisher ministry; the 8th Australian federal ministry, 1910.

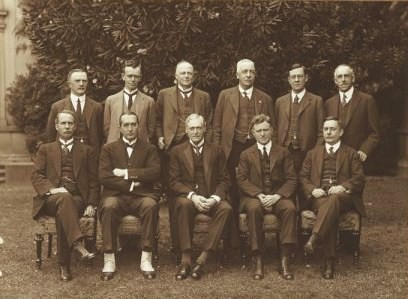
The First Bruce ministry; the 16th Australian federal ministry, 1923.

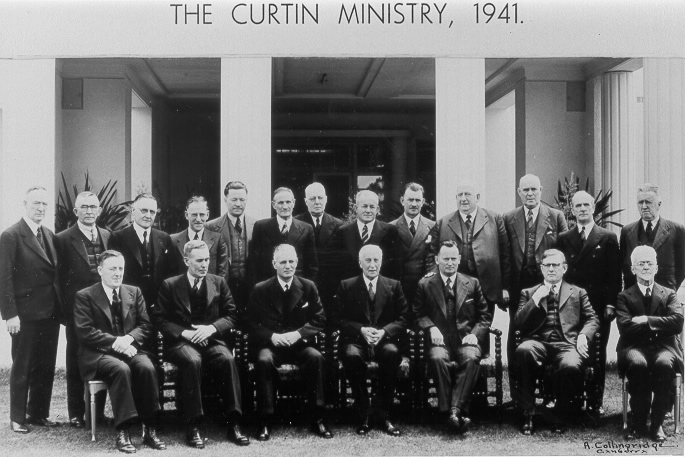
The First Curtin ministry; the 29th Australian federal ministry, 1941.

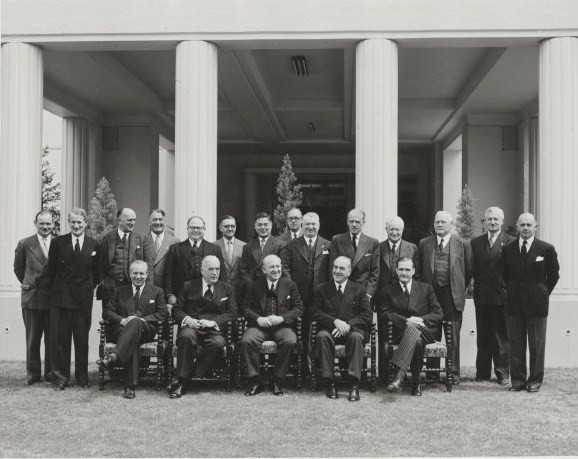
The Fifth Menzies ministry; the 35th Australian federal ministry, 1951.

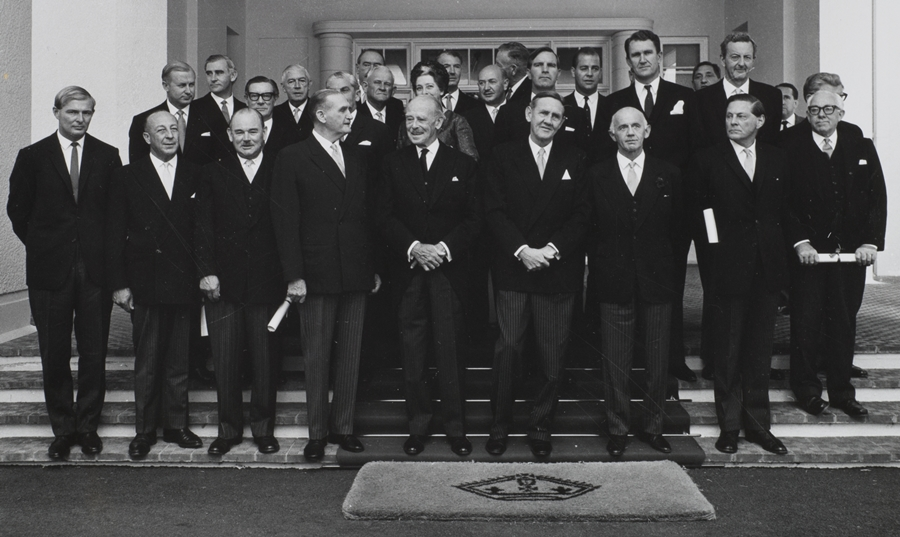
The First Gorton ministry; the 44th Australian federal ministry, 1968.

Order	Ministry	Prime Minister	Governing party	Dates	
Order	Ministry	Prime Minister	Governing party	Constituted	Concluded
1	Barton ministry	Edmund Barton	Protectionist	1 January 1901	24 September 1903
2	First Deakin ministry	Alfred Deakin	Protectionist	24 September 1903	27 April 1904
3	Watson ministry	Chris Watson	Labor / Protectionist	27 April 1904	17 August 1904
4	Reid ministry	George Reid	Free Trade / Protectionist	18 August 1904	5 July 1905
5	Second Deakin ministry	Alfred Deakin	Protectionist	5 July 1905	13 November 1908
6	First Fisher ministry	Andrew Fisher	Labor	13 November 1908	2 June 1909
7	Third Deakin ministry	Alfred Deakin	Liberal	2 June 1909	29 April 1910
8	Second Fisher ministry	Andrew Fisher	Labour	29 April 1910	24 June 1913
9	Cook ministry	Joseph Cook	Liberal	24 June 1913	17 September 1914
10	Third Fisher ministry	Andrew Fisher	Labor	17 September 1914	27 October 1915
11	First Hughes ministry	Billy Hughes	Labor	27 October 1915	14 November 1916
12	Second Hughes ministry	Billy Hughes	National Labor	14 November 1916	17 February 1917
13	Third Hughes ministry	Billy Hughes	Nationalist	17 February 1917	8 January 1918
14	Fourth Hughes ministry	Billy Hughes	Nationalist	8 January 1918	4 February 1920
15	Fifth Hughes ministry	Billy Hughes	Nationalist	4 February 1920	9 February 1923
16	First Bruce ministry	Stanley Bruce	Nationalist / Country	9 February 1923	18 December 1925
17	Second Bruce ministry	Stanley Bruce	Nationalist / Country	18 December 1925	29 November 1928
18	Third Bruce ministry	Stanley Bruce	Nationalist / Country	29 November 1928	22 October 1929
19	Scullin ministry	James Scullin	Labor	22 October 1929	6 January 1932
20	First Lyons ministry	Joseph Lyons	United Australia	6 January 1932	12 October 1934
21	Second Lyons ministry	Joseph Lyons	United Australia	12 October 1934	9 November 1934
22	Third Lyons ministry	Joseph Lyons	United Australia / Country	9 November 1934	29 November 1937
23	Fourth Lyons ministry	Joseph Lyons	United Australia / Country	29 November 1937	7 April 1939
24	Page ministry (Caretaker)	Earle Page	Country / United Australia	7 April 1939	26 April 1939
25	First Menzies ministry	Robert Menzies	United Australia	26 April 1939	14 March 1940
26	Second Menzies ministry	Robert Menzies	United Australia / Country	14 March 1940	28 October 1940
27	Third Menzies ministry	Robert Menzies	United Australia / Country	28 October 1940	28 August 1941
28	Fadden ministry	Arthur Fadden	Country / United Australia	28 August 1941	7 October 1941
29	First Curtin ministry	John Curtin	Labor	7 October 1941	21 September 1943
30	Second Curtin ministry	John Curtin	Labor	21 September 1943	6 July 1945
31	Forde ministry (Caretaker)	Frank Forde	Labor	6 July 1945	13 July 1945
32	First Chifley ministry	Ben Chifley	Labor	13 July 1945	1 November 1946
33	Second Chifley ministry	Ben Chifley	Labor	1 November 1946	19 December 1949
34	Fourth Menzies ministry	Robert Menzies	Liberal / Country	19 December 1949	11 May 1951
35	Fifth Menzies ministry	Robert Menzies	Liberal / Country	11 May 1951	9 July 1954
36	Sixth Menzies ministry	Robert Menzies	Liberal / Country	9 July 1954	11 January 1956
37	Seventh Menzies ministry	Robert Menzies	Liberal / Country	11 January 1956	10 December 1958
38	Eighth Menzies ministry	Robert Menzies	Liberal / Country	10 December 1958	22 December 1961
39	Ninth Menzies ministry	Robert Menzies	Liberal / Country	22 December 1961	18 December 1963
40	Tenth Menzies ministry	Robert Menzies	Liberal / Country	18 December 1963	26 January 1966
41	First Holt ministry	Harold Holt	Liberal / Country	26 January 1966	14 December 1966
42	Second Holt ministry	Harold Holt	Liberal / Country	14 December 1966	19 December 1967
43	McEwen ministry (Caretaker)	John McEwen	Liberal / Country	19 December 1967	10 January 1968
44	First Gorton ministry	John Gorton	Liberal / Country	10 January 1968	12 November 1969
45	Second Gorton ministry	John Gorton	Liberal / Country	12 November 1969	10 March 1971
46	McMahon ministry	William McMahon	Liberal / Country	10 March 1971	5 December 1972
47	First Whitlam ministry	Gough Whitlam	Labor	5 December 1972	19 December 1972
48	Second Whitlam ministry	Gough Whitlam	Labor	19 December 1972	12 June 1974
49	Third Whitlam ministry	Gough Whitlam	Labor	12 June 1974	11 November 1975
50	First Fraser ministry	Malcolm Fraser	Liberal / National Country	11 November 1975	22 December 1975
51	Second Fraser ministry	Malcolm Fraser	Liberal / National Country	22 December 1975	20 December 1977
52	Third Fraser ministry	Malcolm Fraser	Liberal / National Country	20 December 1977	3 November 1980
53	Fourth Fraser ministry	Malcolm Fraser	Liberal / National Country	3 November 1980	11 March 1983
54	First Hawke ministry	Bob Hawke	Labor	11 March 1983	13 December 1984
55	Second Hawke ministry	Bob Hawke	Labor	13 December 1984	24 July 1987
56	Third Hawke ministry	Bob Hawke	Labor	24 July 1987	4 April 1990
57	Fourth Hawke ministry	Bob Hawke	Labor	4 April 1990	20 December 1991
58	First Keating ministry	Paul Keating	Labor	20 December 1991	24 March 1993
59	Second Keating ministry	Paul Keating	Labor	24 March 1993	11 March 1996
60	First Howard ministry	John Howard	Liberal / National	11 March 1996	21 October 1998
61	Second Howard ministry	John Howard	Liberal / National	21 October 1998	26 November 2001
62	Third Howard ministry	John Howard	Liberal / National	26 November 2001	26 October 2004
63	Fourth Howard ministry	John Howard	Liberal / National	26 October 2004	3 December 2007
64	First Rudd ministry	Kevin Rudd	Labor	3 December 2007	24 June 2010
65	First Gillard ministry	Julia Gillard	Labor	24 June 2010	14 September 2010
66	Second Gillard ministry	Julia Gillard	Labor	14 September 2010	27 June 2013
67	Second Rudd ministry	Kevin Rudd	Labor	27 June 2013	18 September 2013
68	Abbott ministry	Tony Abbott	Liberal / National	18 September 2013	15 September 2015
69	First Turnbull ministry	Malcolm Turnbull	Liberal / National	15 September 2015	19 July 2016
70	Second Turnbull ministry	Malcolm Turnbull	Liberal / National	19 July 2016	24 August 2018
71	First Morrison ministry	Scott Morrison	Liberal / National	24 August 2018	29 May 2019
72	Second Morrison ministry	Scott Morrison	Liberal / National	29 May 2019	23 May 2022
73	First Albanese ministry	Anthony Albanese	Labor	23 May 2022	13 May 2025
74	Second Albanese ministry	Anthony Albanese	Labor	13 May 2025	Present

== Notes ==
1..Date of swearing in of Interim ministry. Full ministry to be sworn in 1st July 2022.
