= Fadden government =

1941 executive government of Australia

Fadden government

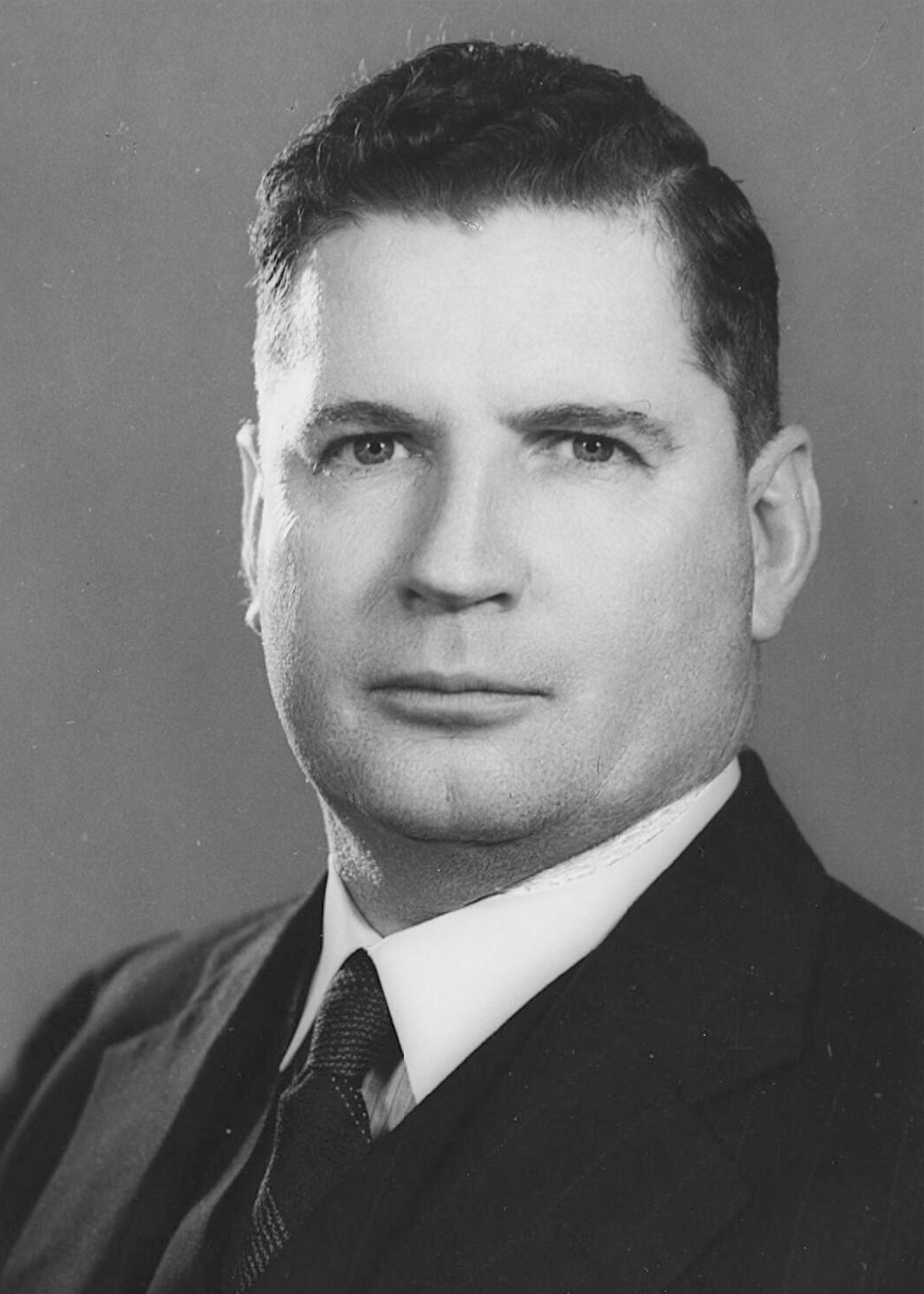

In office
- 29 August – 7 October 1941
- Monarch: George VI
- Prime Minister: Arthur Fadden
- Deputy: Robert Menzies
- Parties: Country; UAP
- Origin: Resignation of Robert Menzies
- Demise: Lost confidence motion
- Predecessor: Menzies government (I)
- Successor: Curtin government

The Fadden government was the federal executive government of Australia led by Prime Minister Arthur Fadden, as leader of the Country Party. He was appointed prime minister on 29 August 1941, during World War II, following the resignation of Robert Menzies of the United Australia Party (UAP). Fadden continued the coalition government between the Country Party and the UAP, but after just over one month in office the government was defeated on a confidence motion. Fadden was succeeded as prime minister on 7 October 1941 by John Curtin of the Australian Labor Party (ALP).

== Background ==
The newly formed United Australia Party stewarded Australia's recovery from the Great Depression and entry into World War II, generally in coalition with the Country Party. The Lyons government was led by the popular Joseph Lyons from 1932 to 1939, but his sudden death in 1939 saw the Governor General appoint Country Party leader Earle Page as caretaker Prime Minister pending the election of a new UAP leader. The UAP turned to Robert Menzies, who became Prime Minister and led the first Menzies government in the final months before the outbreak of World War Two in Europe and through the first two years of Australia's war effort. Menzies and Page had an openly antagonistic relationship and would not work together in coalition.

John Curtin was first elected leader of the opposition Australian Labor Party in 1935. Defence issues were becoming increasingly dominant in public affairs with the rise of fascism in Europe and militant Japan in Asia. Curtin led Labor to the 1937 election against Joseph Lyons' United Australia Party which resulted in a comfortable victory to the UAP.

=== Arthur Fadden ===
Fadden was a Queenslander who had begun his working life as a cane-cutters' offsider. After a time as a member of the Queensland Parliament he entered Federal Parliament in 1936. He disassociated himself from Earle Page's attacks on Menzies and became leader of the Country Party, following the resignation of Page in 1939. Intended as a stop-gap, he was elected Deputy Leader and appointed acting-leader because Archie Cameron and John McEwen had tied in a vote for the leadership. When Menzies formed a Coalition with the Country Party in March 1940, Fadden became Minister Assisting the Treasurer and Minister of Supply and Development. Later he was appointed Minister for Air and Civil Aviation. Following the 1940 Election, Fadden became Treasurer, In March 1941, the Country Party finally confirmed him as their leader.

=== War ===
On 3 September 1939, Prime Minister Menzies announced Australia's declaration of war on Nazi Germany. Australia had entered World War II, following the Nazi invasion of Poland. The Labor Party declined to enter a war cabinet led by Menzies, though Curtin offered co-operation – though not to the extent of supporting conscription for overseas service. The Labor Party experienced a split along pro and anti Communist lines over policy towards the Soviet Union for its co-operation with Nazi Germany in the invasion of Poland and Labor narrowly lost the September 1940 Election. The Menzies government UAP–Country Party coalition and the Labor parties won 36 seats each and the Menzies was forced to rely upon the support of two Independents, Alex Wilson and Arthur Coles to continue in office. New Country Party leader Arthur Fadden became Treasurer and Menzies unhappily conceded to allow Earle Page back into his ministry.

In Europe, the Phoney War gave way to a succession of Allied defeats, as Germany overran the Low Countries, Norway and France. By June 1940, the British Empire stood alone against Germany. In the Pacific, Australia feared Japanese intentions.

Curtin took a seat on the newly created Advisory War Council in October 1940 and agreed to a plan by Menzies to travel to Washington and London. In January 1941, Menzies flew to Britain to discuss the weakness of Singapore's defences and sit with Winston Churchill's British War Cabinet. In Menzies' absence, Curtin co-operated with Deputy Prime Minister Arthur Fadden in preparing Australia for the expected Pacific War. After four months, Menzies returned to Australia to face a lack of enthusiasm for his global travels and a war-time minority government full of intrigue and under ever increasing strain. With the threat of Japan imminent and with the Australian army suffering badly in the Greek and Crete campaigns, Menzies re-approached the Labor Party to form a War Cabinet. Menzies had planned a further trip to Britain to influence the conduct of the Allied campaign. Unable to secure Curtin's support, and with an unworkable parliamentary majority, Menzies resigned as Prime Minister.

The UAP-Country Party Coalition would hold office for another month with Fadden as prime minister.

== Term in office ==
Menzies resigned on 28 August 1941 and a joint United Australia Party–Country Party meeting chose Arthur Fadden, leader of the Country Party, to be his successor as Prime Minister of Australia. Fadden had just 13 party supporters in a Parliament of 75, but with the UAP in disarray, he assumed the Prime Ministership. The Coalition survived with the support of two independents – Alex Wilson and Arthur Coles. Fadden was Prime Minister from 29 August to 7 October 1941.

Menzies declared loyalty to Fadden and served as Minister for Defence Co-ordination. The destabilising Earle Page was despatched to England as "Special Envoy" to the British War Cabinet.

Australia marked 2 years of war on 7 September 1941 with a day of prayer, on which Prime Minister Fadden broadcast to the nation an exhortation to be united in the ‘supreme task of defeating the forces of evil in the world". With the Pacific on the brink of war, Opposition leader John Curtin offered friendship and co-operation to Fadden, but refused to join in an all-party wartime national government.

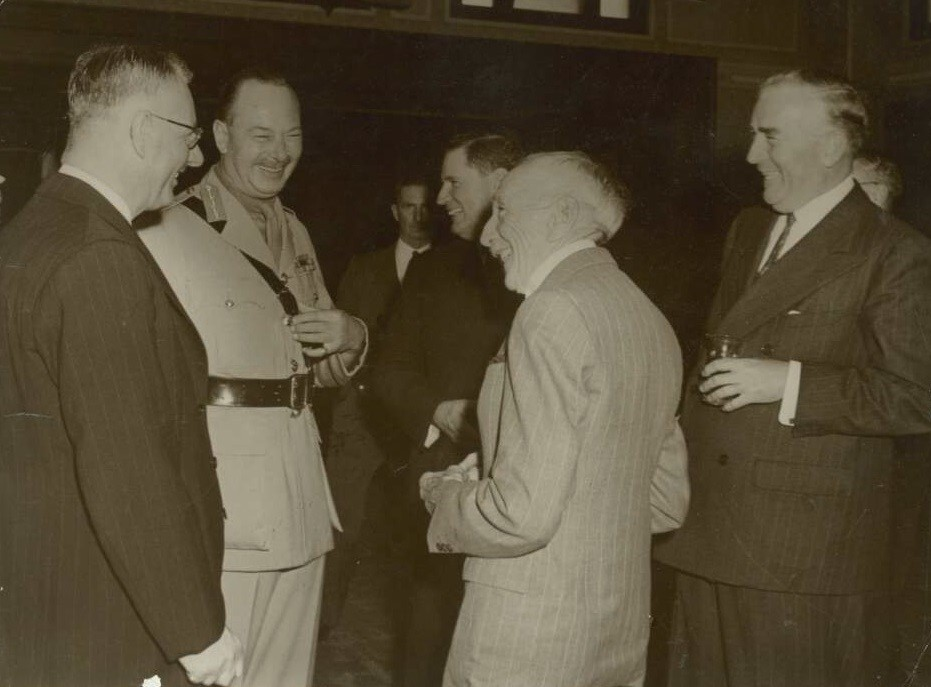
Four Prime Ministers in 1945: Labor Prime Minister John Curtin (left) shares a joke with the Governor General Prince Henry (in uniform) with former Country Party Prime Minister Arthur Fadden, Nationalist Prime Minister Billy Hughes and UAP Prime Minister Robert Menzies.

According to political historian Brian Carroll, Fadden "did no better than Menzies in getting the country organized for the war. He ruled for only 40 days and came to grief largely because he did not like Arthur Coles and made no effort to win his support". Coles persuaded the other independent, Alex Wilson, to support him in crossing the floor and then advised Opposition Leader Curtin of their intention. On 3 October, Curtin moved that the Government reduce the budget by 1 pound. The independents, Coles and Wilson, voted with the Opposition in the House of Representatives to reject Fadden's budget and therefore the Fadden government. Fadden resigned. To date, this is the last occasion on which a government was defeated as a result of losing the confidence of the House of Representatives. Curtin was sworn in as Prime Minister on 7 October 1941. Eight weeks later, Japan attacked Pearl Harbor.

== Aftermath ==
Fadden became leader of the Opposition and the UAP elected the 79-year-old Billy Hughes as leader in place of Menzies. Curtin proved a popular leader, rallying the nation in the face of the danger of invasion by the Japanese after Japan's entry into the war in December 1941. The Labor government seemed more effective than its unsettled predecessor, and the UAP and the Country Party, in opposition, made little political mileage against it. In the 1943 federal election, the Fadden-Hughes Coalition suffered a massive defeat. The UAP was reduced to 14 members, and the Country Party to just nine. Menzies became leader of the UAP and Opposition Leader, with Fadden as deputy.

The United Australia Party disintegrated after suffering a heavy defeat in the election. Robert Menzies called a conference of conservative parties and other groups opposed to the ruling Australian Labor Party which met in Canberra on 13 October 1944, and again in Albury in December 1944. The formation of a new party – the Liberal Party of Australia – was formally announced at Sydney Town Hall on 31 August 1945.

After an initial loss to Labor at the 1946 election, Menzies led the Liberals to victory in coalition with the Country Party at the 1949 election against the incumbent Labor government led by Ben Chifley. Fadden became Treasurer. The new Liberal-Country Party Coalition was to remain in office for a record 23 years.

== See also ==
- History of Australia
- History of Australia (1901-1945)
- Fadden Ministry
- Third Menzies Ministry
