= Curtin government =

Government of Australia, 1941–1945

Curtin government

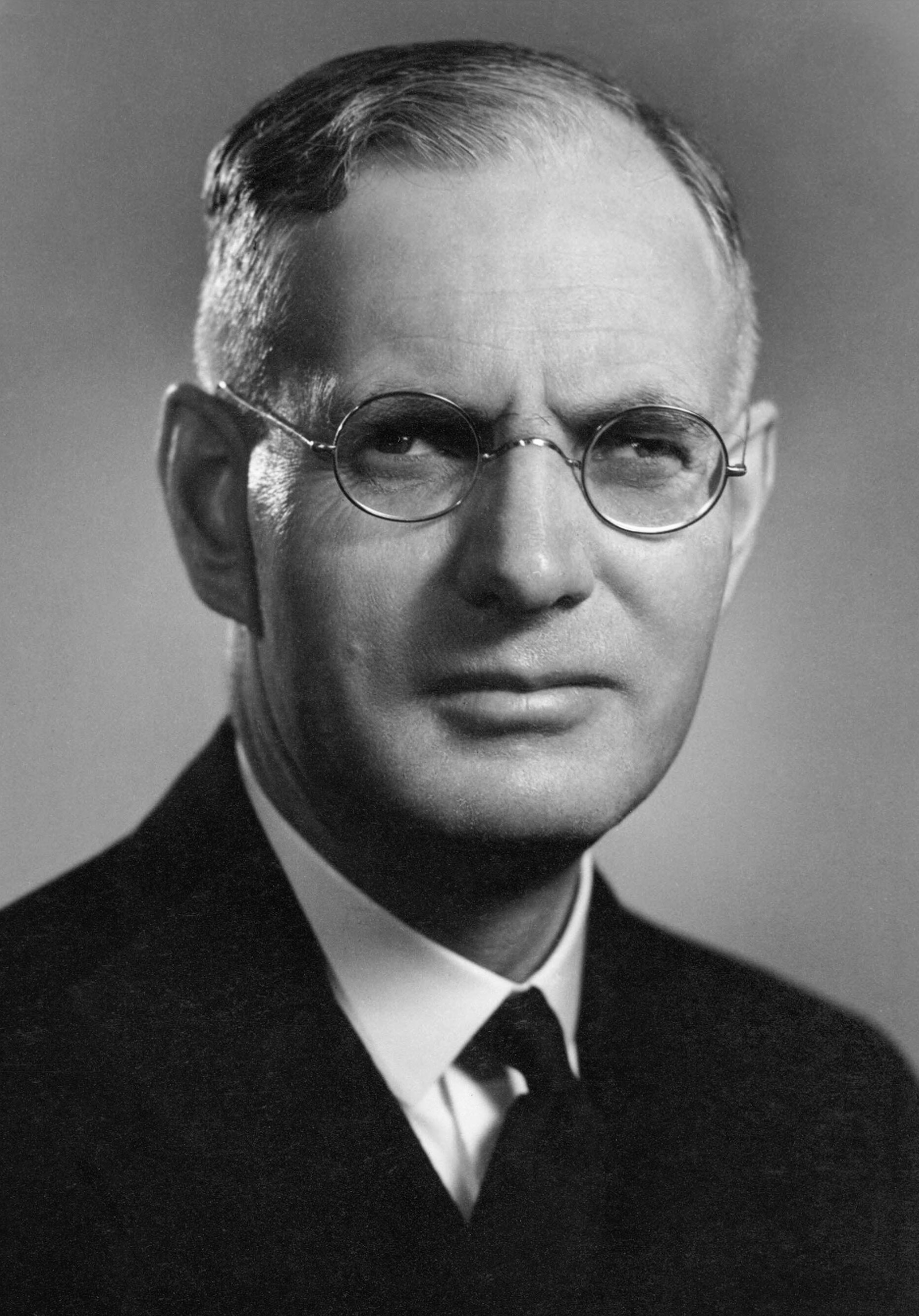

In office
- 7 October 1941 – 5 July 1945
- Monarch: George VI
- Prime Minister: John Curtin
- Deputy: Frank Forde
- Party: Labor
- Status: Minority (1941–1943); Majority (1943–1945)
- Origin: Predecessor lost confidence motion
- Demise: Curtin's death
- Predecessor: Fadden government
- Successor: Forde government

The Curtin government was the federal executive government of Australia led by Prime Minister John Curtin. It was made up of members of the Australian Labor Party in the Australian Parliament from 1941 to 1945.

== Background ==
John Curtin was first elected leader of the Australian Labor Party and became leader of the opposition in 1935. Defence issues were becoming increasingly dominant in public affairs with the rise of Fascism in Europe and militant Japan in Asia. Curtin led Labor to the 1937 election against Joseph Lyons' United Australia Party which resulted in a comfortable victory to the UAP. Lyons died in office in April 1939 and the UAP selected Robert Menzies to succeed him as Prime Minister.

On 3 September 1939, Prime Minister Menzies announced Australia's declaration of war on Nazi Germany. Australia had entered World War II, following the Nazi invasion of Poland. The Labor Party declined to enter a war cabinet led by Menzies, though Curtin offered co-operation – though not to the extent of supporting conscription for overseas service. The Labor Party experienced a split along pro and anti Communist lines over policy towards the Soviet Union for its co-operation with Nazi Germany in the invasion of Poland and Labor narrowly lost the September 1940 Election. The Menzies government relied upon the support of two Independents, Alex Wilson and Arthur Coles to continue in office.

Curtin took a seat on the newly created Advisory War Council in October 1940 and agreed to a plan by Menzies to travel to Washington and London. In January 1941, Menzies flew to Britain to discuss the weakness of Singapore's defences and sit with Winston Churchill's British War Cabinet. In Menzies's absence, Curtin co-operated with Deputy Prime Minister Arthur Fadden in preparing Australia for the expected Pacific War. Returning to Australia, with the threat of Japan imminent and with the Australian army suffering badly in the Greek and Crete campaigns, Menzies re-approached the Labor Party to form a War Cabinet. Menzies had planned a further trip to Britain to influence the conduct of the Allied campaign. Unable to secure Curtin's support, and with an unworkable parliamentary majority, Menzies resigned as Prime Minister. The UAP-Coalition held office for another month with Arthur Fadden of the Country Party as its leader, before the independents switched allegiance and John Curtin was sworn in as Prime Minister on 7 October 1941. Eight weeks later, Japan attacked Pearl Harbor.

== In Office ==
John Curtin (8 January 1885 – 5 July 1945) served as the 14th Prime Minister of Australia. Labor under Curtin formed a minority government in 1941 after independents crossed the floor, bringing down the Coalition minority United Australia Party-Country Party Coalition government which resulted from the 1940 election. Curtin went on to lead federal Labor to its greatest win with two-thirds of seats in the lower house and over 58 percent of the two-party preferred vote at the 1943 election. Labor won 49 seats to 12 United Australia Party, 7 Country Party, 3 Country National Party (Queensland), 1 Queensland Country Party, 1 Liberal Country Party (Victoria) and 1 Independent in the Australian House of Representatives. The Labor Party also won all 19 of the seats contested for the Australian Senate.

Curtin led Australia when the Australian mainland came under direct military threat during the Japanese advance in World War II. He is widely regarded as one of the country's greatest Prime Ministers. General Douglas MacArthur said that Curtin was "one of the greatest of the wartime statesmen".

With most of Australia's best forces committed to fight against Hitler in the Middle East, Japan attacked Pearl Harbor, the US naval base in Hawaii, on 8 December 1941 (eastern Australia time). The British battleship HMS Prince of Wales and battlecruiser HMS Repulse sent to defend Singapore were sunk soon afterwards. Australia was ill-prepared for an attack, lacking armaments, modern fighter aircraft, heavy bombers, and aircraft carriers. While demanding reinforcements from Churchill, on 27 December 1941 Curtin published an historic announcement:

"The Australian Government...regards the Pacific struggle as primarily one in which the United States and Australia must have the fullest say in the direction of the democracies' fighting plan. Without inhibitions of any kind, I make it clear that Australia looks to America, free of any pangs as to our traditional links or kinship with the United Kingdom."

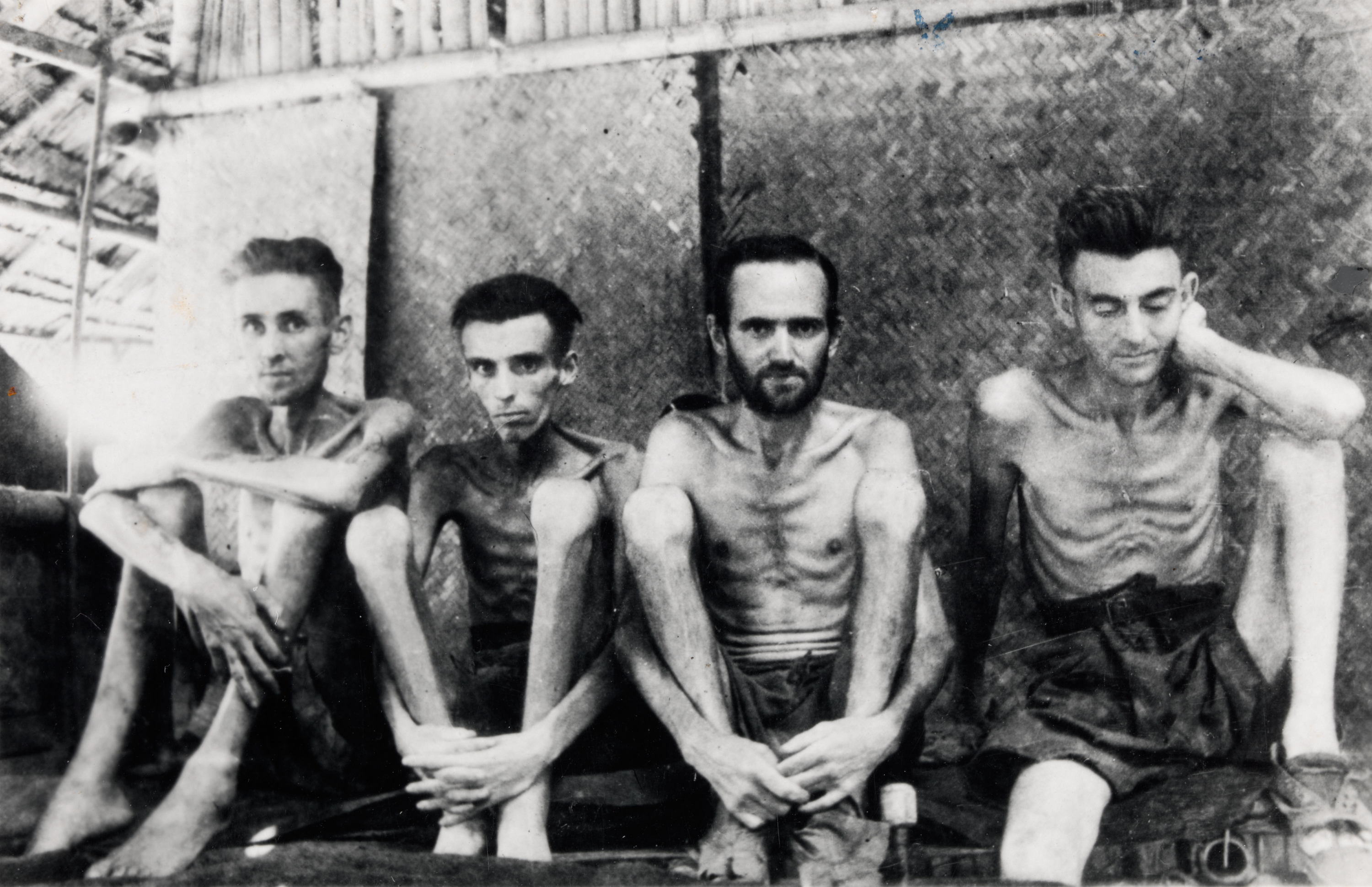
Dutch and Australian PoWs of the Japanese at Tarsau, in Thailand in 1943. The Fall of Singapore followed soon after Curtin became Prime Minister of Australia.

British Malaya quickly collapsed, shocking the Australian nation. British, Indian and Australian troops made a disorganised last stand at Singapore, before surrendering on 15 February 1942. Around 15,000 Australian soldiers became prisoners of war. Curtin predicted that the "battle for Australia" would now follow. On 19 February, Darwin suffered a devastating air raid, the first time the Australian mainland had ever been attacked by enemy forces. Over the following 19 months, Australia was attacked from the air almost 100 times.

Two battle-hardened Australian divisions were already steaming from the Mid-East for Singapore. Churchill wanted them diverted to Burma, but Curtin refused, and anxiously awaited their return to Australia. US president Franklin Roosevelt ordered his commander in the Philippines, General Douglas MacArthur, to formulate a Pacific defence plan with Australia in March 1942. Curtin agreed to place Australian forces under the command of General MacArthur, who became "Supreme Commander of the South West Pacific". Curtin had thus presided over a fundamental shift in Australia's foreign policy. MacArthur moved his headquarters to Melbourne in March 1942 and American troops began massing in Australia. In late May 1942, Japanese midget submarines sank an accommodation vessel in a daring raid on Sydney Harbour. On 8 June 1942, two Japanese submarines briefly shelled Sydney's eastern suburbs and the city of Newcastle.

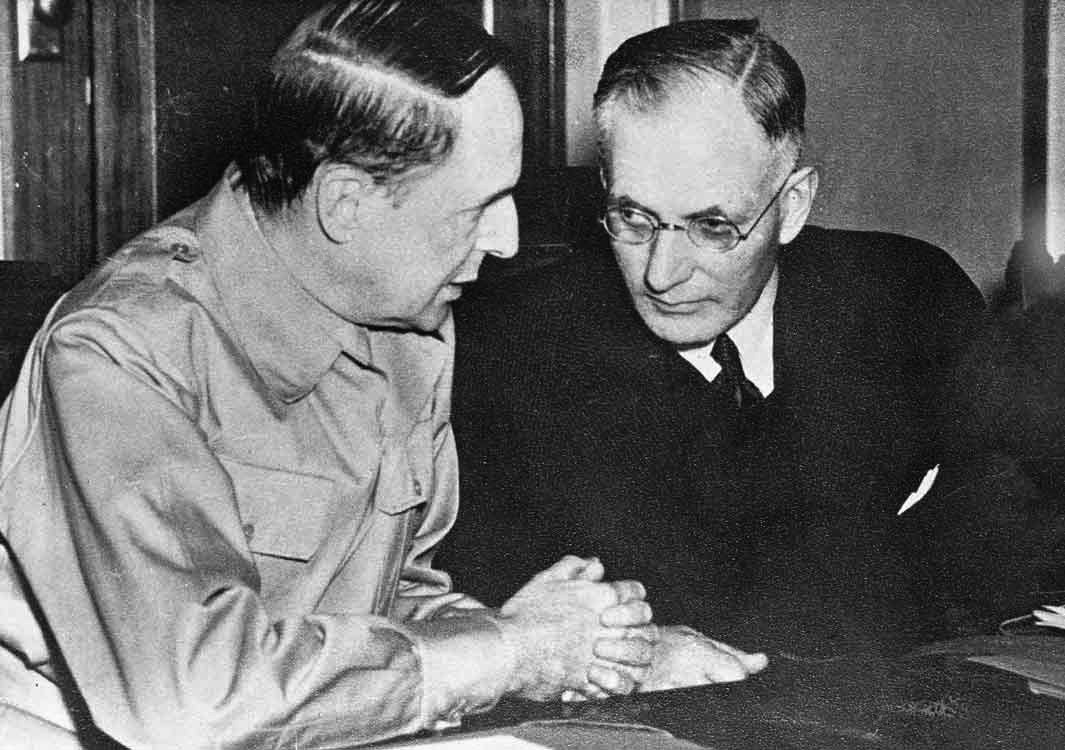
US General Douglas MacArthur, Commander of Allied forces in the Pacific, with Prime Minister Curtin

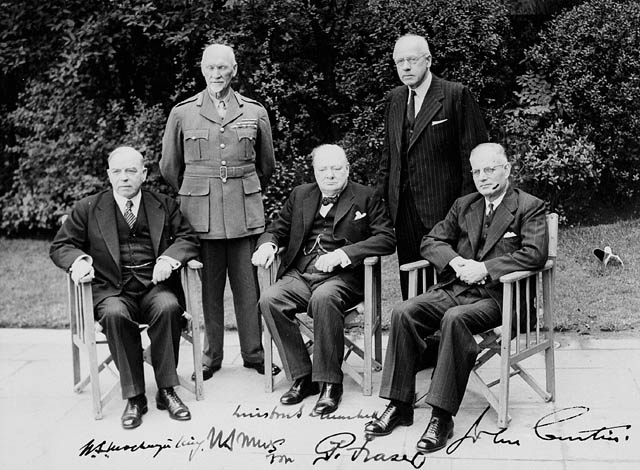
Curtin, sitting right, at the 1944 Commonwealth Prime Ministers' Conference

In an effort to isolate Australia, the Japanese planned a seaborne invasion of Port Moresby, in the Australian Territory of New Guinea. In May 1942, the US Navy engaged the Japanese in the Battle of the Coral Sea and halted the attack. The Battle of Midway in June effectively defeated the Japanese navy and the Japanese army launched a land assault on Moresby from the north. Between July and November 1942, Australian forces repulsed Japanese attempts on the city by way of the Kokoda Track, in the highlands of New Guinea. The Battle of Milne Bay in August 1942 was the first Allied defeat of Japanese land forces.

Concerned to maintain British commitment to the defence of Australia, Prime Minister Curtin announced in November 1943 that Prince Henry, Duke of Gloucester was to be appointed Governor General of Australia. The brother of King George VI arrived in Australia to take up his post in January 1945. Curtin hoped this might influence the British to despatch men and equipment to the Pacific, and the appointment reaffirmed the important role of the Crown to the Australian nation at that time.

The Battle of Buna-Gona, between November 1942 and January 1943, set the tone for the bitter final stages of the New Guinea campaign, which persisted into 1945. MacCarthur to a certain extent excluded Australian forces from the main push north into the Philippines and Japan. It was left to Australia to lead amphibious assaults against Japanese bases in Borneo.

As the end of the war approached, Curtin sought to firm up Australian influence in the South Pacific following the war but also sought to ensure a continuing role for the British Empire, calling Australia "the bastion of British institutions, the British way of life and the system of democratic government in the Southern World". In April 1944, Curtin held talks on postwar planning with United States president Franklin Roosevelt and with British prime minister Winston Churchill and gained agreement for the Australian economy to begin transitioning from military to post-war economy. He returned to Australia and campaigned for an unsuccessful 1944 referendum to extend federal government power over employment, monopolies, Aboriginal people, health and railway gauges.

In April 1945, Curtin despatched an Australian delegation which included attorney-general and minister for external affairs H V Evatt to discuss formation of the United Nations. Australia played a significant mediatory role in these early years of the United Nations, successfully lobbying for an increased role for smaller and middle-ranking nations and a stronger commitment to employment rights into the U.N. Charter. Evatt was elected president of the third session of the United Nations General Assembly (September 1948 to May 1949).

== Death of Curtin ==
Prime Minister Curtin suffered from ill health from the strains of office. He suffered a major heart attack in November 1944. Facing the newly formed Liberal Party of Australia opposition led by Robert Menzies, Curtin struggled with exhaustion and a heavy work load – excusing himself from Parliamentary question time and unable to concentrate on the large number of parliamentary bills being drafted dealing with the coming peace. Curtin returned to hospital in April with lung congestion. With Deputy Prime Minister Frank Forde in the United States and Ben Chifley serving as acting Prime Minister, it was Chifley who announced the end of the war in Europe on 9 May 1945.

When Curtin died towards the end of the Second World War in July 1945, Frank Forde served as Prime Minister from 6–13 July, before the party elected Ben Chifley as Curtin's successor. Following his 1945 election as leader of the Australian Labor Party, Chifley, a former railway engine driver, became Australia's 16th Prime Minister on 13 July 1945. The Second World War ended with the defeat of Japan in the Pacific just four weeks later.

== See also ==
- History of Australia
- History of Australia since 1945
- First Curtin Ministry
- Second Curtin Ministry
- Chifley government
