= First Chifley ministry =

32nd ministry of government of Australia

- 32nd Ministry of Australia

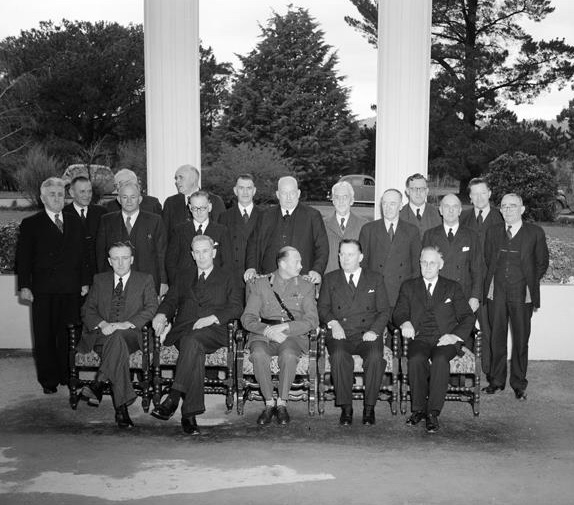
- Group photo of the First Chifley ministry
- Date formed: 13 July 1945
- Date dissolved: 1 November 1946

People and organisations
- Monarch: George VI
- Governor-General: Prince Henry, Duke of Gloucester
- Prime Minister: Ben Chifley
- No. of ministers: 20
- Member party: Labor
- Status in legislature: Majority government
- Opposition party: Liberal–Country coalition
- Opposition leader: Robert Menzies

History
- Outgoing election: 28 September 1946
- Legislature term: 17th
- Predecessor: Forde ministry
- Successor: Second Chifley ministry

The First Chifley ministry (Labor) was the 32nd ministry of the Government of Australia. It was led by the country's 16th Prime Minister, Ben Chifley. The First Chifley ministry succeeded the Forde ministry, which dissolved on 13 July 1945 following the election of Chifley as Labor leader after the death of former Prime Minister John Curtin. The ministry was replaced by the Second Chifley ministry on 1 November 1946 following the 1946 federal election.

Frank Forde, who died in 1983, was the last surviving member of the First Chifley ministry; Forde was also the last surviving minister of the Scullin government, the Curtin government, and the Forde government.

== Ministry ==
Party	Minister	Portrait	Portfolio
Labor	Ben Chifley (1885–1951) MP for Macquarie (1940–1951)		Prime Minister; Leader of the Labor Party; Treasurer
Labor	Frank Forde (1890–1983) MP for Capricornia (1922–1946)		Deputy Leader of the Labor Party (to 28 September 1946); Minister for the Army; Minister for Defence (from 15 August 1946)
Labor	H. V. Evatt (1894–1965) MP for Barton (1940–1958)		Deputy Leader of the Labor Party (from 31 October 1946); Attorney-General; Minister for External Affairs
Labor	Jack Beasley (1895–1949) MP for West Sydney (1928–1946)		Minister for Defence (to 14 August 1946)
Labor	Norman Makin (1889–1982) MP for Hindmarsh (1919–1946)		Minister for the Navy (to 15 August 1946); Minister for Munitions (to 15 August 1946); Minister for Aircraft Production (to 15 August 1946)
Labor	Richard Keane (1881–1946) Senator for Victoria (1938–1946)		Minister for Trade and Customs (to 26 April 1946); Leader of the Government in the Senate (to 26 April 1946)
Labor	Jack Holloway (1875–1967) MP for Melbourne Ports (1931–1951)		Minister for Labour and National Service
Labor	Arthur Drakeford (1878–1957) MP for Maribyrnong (1934–1955)		Minister for Air; Minister for Civil Aviation; Minister for the Navy (from 15 August 1946)
Labor	William Scully (1883–1966) MP for Gwydir (1937–1949)		Minister for Commerce and Agriculture
Labor	Bill Ashley (1881–1958) Senator for New South Wales (1937–1958)		Minister for Supply and Shipping; Leader of the Government in the Senate (from 17 June 1946)
Labor	John Dedman (1896–1973) MP for Corio (1940–1949)		Minister in charge of the Council for Scientific and Industrial Research; Minister for Postwar Reconstruction; Minister for Trade and Customs (from 29 April 1946 to 18 June 1946); Minister for Munitions (from 15 August 1946); Minister for Aircraft Production (from 15 August 1946)
Labor	Joe Collings (1865–1955) Senator for Queensland (1932–1950)		Vice-President of the Executive Council
Labor	Eddie Ward (1899–1963) MP for East Sydney (1932–1963)		Minister for Transport; Minister for External Territories
Labor	James Fraser (1889–1961) Senator for Western Australia (1938–1959)		Minister for Health (to 18 June 1946); Minister for Social Services (to 18 June 1946); Minister for Trade and Customs (from 18 June 1946)
Labor	Charles Frost (1882–1964) MP for Franklin (1934–1946)		Minister for Repatriation
Labor	Bert Lazzarini (1884–1952) MP for Werriwa (1934–1952)		Minister for Home Security (to 1 February 1946); Minister for Works and Housing
Labor	Don Cameron (1878–1962) Senator for Victoria (1938–1962)		Postmaster-General
Labor	Arthur Calwell (1896–1973) MP for Melbourne (1940–1972)		Minister for Information; Minister for Immigration
Labor	Herbert Johnson (1889–1962) MP for Kalgoorlie (1940–1958)		Minister for the Interior; Minister assisting the Minister for Works and Housing
Labor	Nick McKenna (1895–1974) Senator for Tasmania (1944–1968) (in Ministry from 18 June 1946)		Minister for Health (from 18 June 1946); Minister for Social Services (from 18 June 1946)
