= Scullin ministry =

19th ministry of the Government of Australia

- 19th Ministry of Australia

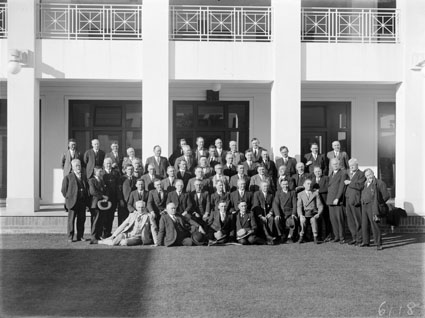
- The Labor Caucus during the Scullin ministry
- Date formed: 22 October 1929
- Date dissolved: 6 January 1932

People and organisations
- Monarch: George V
- Governor-General: John Baird, 1st Baron Stonehaven; Sir Isaac Isaacs
- Prime Minister: James Scullin
- No. of ministers: 19
- Member party: Labor
- Status in legislature: Majority government
- Opposition party: Nationalist; United Australia
- Opposition leader: John Latham; Joseph Lyons

History
- Election: 12 October 1929
- Outgoing election: 19 December 1931
- Legislature term: 12th
- Predecessor: Third Bruce ministry
- Successor: First Lyons ministry

The Scullin ministry (Labor) was the 19th ministry of the Government of Australia. It was led by the country's 9th Prime Minister, James Scullin. The Scullin ministry succeeded the Third Bruce ministry, which dissolved on 22 October 1929 following the federal election that took place on 12 October which saw Labor defeat Stanley Bruce's Nationalist–Country Coalition. The ministry was replaced by the First Lyons ministry on 6 January 1932 following the federal election that took place in December which saw the United Australia Party defeat Labor. As of 2022, it remains the most recent government to have lost an election after a single term in office.

Frank Forde, who died in 1983, was the last surviving member of the Scullin ministry; Forde was also the last surviving minister of the Curtin government, the Forde government, and the First Chifley ministry.

== Ministry ==
Party	Minister	Portrait	Portfolio
Labor	James Scullin (1876–1953) MP for Yarra (1922–1949)		Prime Minister; Leader of the Labor Party; Minister for External Affairs; Minister for Industry; Treasurer (from 9 June 1930 to 29 January 1931)
Labor	Ted Theodore (1884–1950) MP for Dalley (1927–1931)		Deputy Leader of the Labor Party; Treasurer (to 9 June 1930; from 29 January 1931)
Labor	Frank Brennan (1873–1950) MP for Batman (1911–1931)		Attorney-General
Labor	Arthur Blakeley (1886–1972) MP for Darling (1917–1934)		Minister for Home Affairs
Labor	Albert Green (1869–1940) MP for Kalgoorlie (1922–1940)		Minister for Defence (to 4 February 1931); Minister for Works and Railways (from 4 February 1931); Postmaster-General (from 4 February 1931)
Labor	James Fenton (1864–1950) MP for Maribyrnong (1910–1934)		Minister for Trade and Customs (to 4 February 1931)
Labor	Frank Anstey (1865–1940) MP for Bourke (1910–1934)		Minister for Health (to 3 March 1931); Minister for Repatriation (to 3 March 1931)
Labor	Joseph Lyons (1879–1939) MP for Wilmot (1929–1939)		Minister for Works and Railways (to 4 February 1931); Postmaster-General (to 4 February 1931)
Labor	Parker Moloney (1879–1961) MP for Hume (1919–1931)		Minister for Markets and Transport (to 21 April 1930); Minister for Markets (from 21 April 1930); Minister for Transport (from 21 April 1930)
Labor	John Daly (1891–1942) Senator for South Australia (1928–1935)		Vice-President of the Executive Council (to 3 March 1931); Leader of the Government in the Senate (to 3 March 1931); Minister for Defence (from 4 February 1931 to 3 March 1931); Assistant Minister (from 26 June 1931)
Labor	Frank Forde (1890–1983) MP for Capricornia (1922–1946) (in Ministry from 4 February 1931)		Assistant Minister assisting the Minister for Customs (to 4 February 1931); Minister for Trade and Customs (from 4 February 1931)
Labor	Ben Chifley (1885–1951) MP for Macquarie (1928–1931) (in Ministry from 3 March 1931)		Minister for Defence (from 3 March 1931)
Labor	John Barnes (1868–1938) Senator for Victoria (1923–1935) (in Ministry from 3 March 1931)		Assistant Minister assisting the Minister for Works and Railways (to 3 March 1931); Vice-President of the Executive Council (from 3 March 1931); Leader of the Government in the Senate (from 3 March 1931)
Labor	John McNeill (1868–1943) MP for Wannon (1929–1931) (in Ministry from 3 March 1931)		Minister for Health (from 3 March 1931); Minister for Repatriation (from 3 March 1931)

== Assistant ministers ==
Party	Minister	Portrait	Portfolio
Labor	Jack Beasley (1895–1949) MP for West Sydney (1928–1946)		Assistant Minister assisting the Minister for Industry (to 3 March 1931)
Labor	Jack Holloway (1875–1967) MP for Flinders (1929–1931)		Assistant to the Treasurer (from 3 March 1931 to 12 June 1931); Assistant Minister for Minister for Industry, Council for Scientific and Industrial Research (from 3 March 1931 to 12 June 1931)
Labor	John Dooley (1883–1961) Senator for New South Wales (1928–1935)		Assistant Minister assisting the Minister for Works and Railways (from 3 March 1931)
Labor	Charles Culley (1877–1949) MP for Denison (1928–1931)		Assistant Minister for Transport and War Service Homes (from 3 March 1931 to 24 June 1931)
Labor	Lou Cunningham (1889–1948) MP for Gwydir (1929–1931)		Assistant Minister (from 26 June 1931)

== Bibliography ==
- Cook, Peter Sydney. "The Scullin Government, 1929-1932" (PhD dissertation, Australian National University; ProQuest Dissertations & Theses, 1971. 28820451).
