= Minister for Defence Industry =

Australian cabinet position

- Commonwealth Coat of Arms

- Flag of Australia

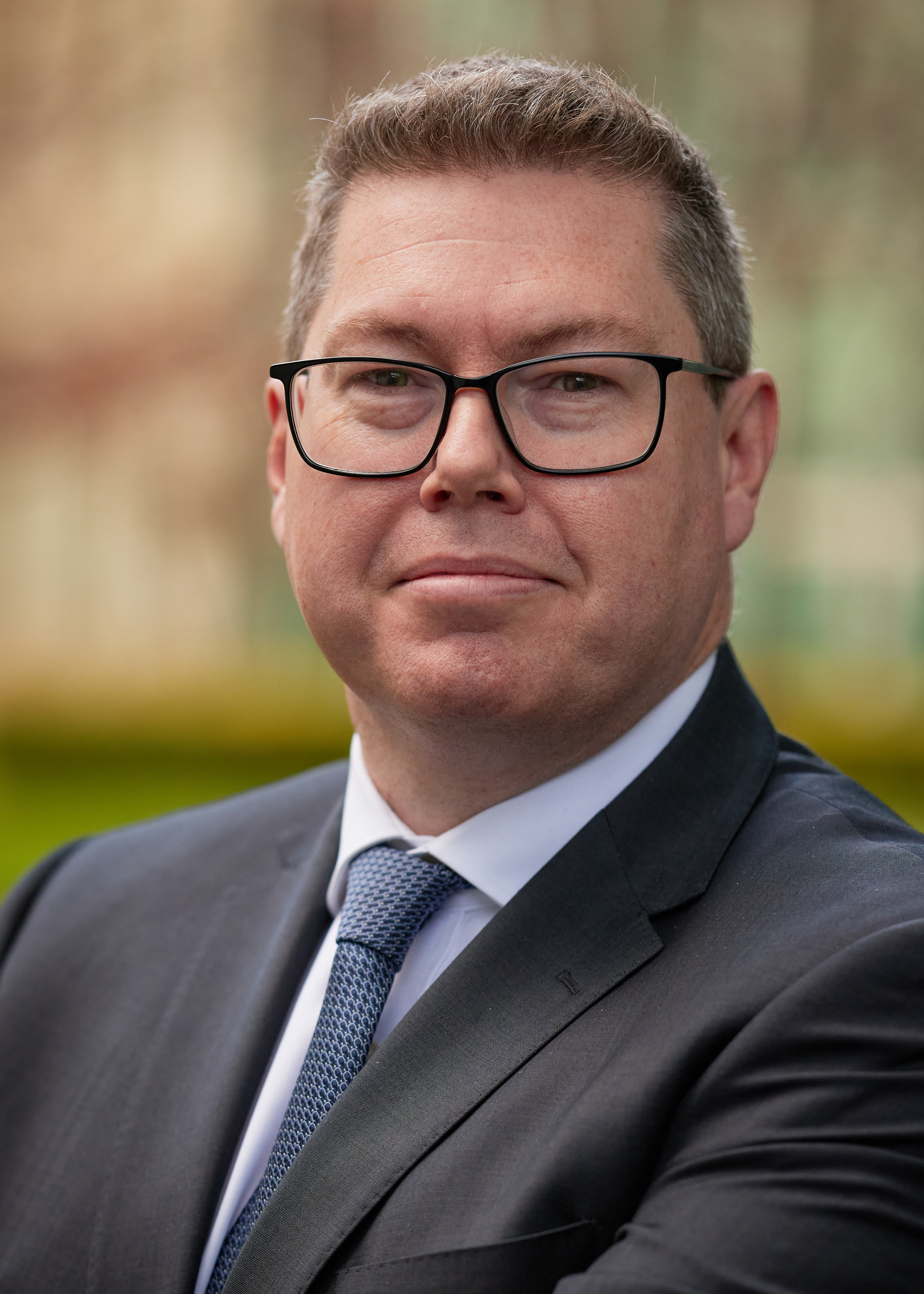
- Incumbent; Pat Conroy since 1 June 2022
- Department of Defence
- Style: The Honourable
- Appointer: Governor-General on the advice of the prime minister
- Inaugural holder: Richard Casey (as Minister for Supply and Development)
- Formation: 26 April 1939
- Website: www.minister.defence.gov.au/current-ministers/2022-06/pat-conroy

In the Government of Australia, the Minister for Defence Industry is currently the Hon Pat Conroy MP since 1 June 2022, following the Australian federal election in 2022.

The Minister for Defence Industry, or previously the Minister of Supply, is a ministerial portfolio that has existed variously since 1939. The Minister appointed is responsible for oversight of defence procurement, financial management, project and sustainment management, materiel engineering, and materiel logistics. The minister aims to ensure that the Australian Defence Force is equipped and supplied with the requirements as identified and approved by Government. The minister administers the portfolio through the Capability Acquisition and Sustainment Group of the Department of Defence.

While ultimately responsible to the Commonwealth of Australia and the Parliament, in practical terms, the minister reports to the Minister for Defence.

== List of ministers for defence industry ==
A minister is appointed with responsibility for oversight of defence procurement, financial management, project and sustainment management, materiel engineering, and materiel logistics to ensure the Australian Defence Force is equipped and supplied with the requirements as identified and approved by Government.

The following individuals have been appointed Minister for Defence Industry, or any of its precedent titles:

Order	Minister	Party	Prime Minister	Title	Term start	Term end	Term in office
1	Richard Casey, DSO, MC	United Australia	Menzies	Minister for Supply and Development	26 April 1939	26 January 1940	275 days
2	Sir Frederick Stewart	United Australia	Menzies	Minister for Supply and Development	26 January 1940	28 October 1940	276 days
3	Sir Philip McBride, KCMG	United Australia	Menzies	Minister for Supply and Development	28 October 1940	26 June 1941	241 days
4	George McLeay	United Australia	Menzies	Minister for Supply and Development	26 June 1941	29 August 1941	103 days
4	George McLeay	United Australia	Fadden	Minister for Supply and Development	29 August 1941	7 October 1941	103 days
5	Jack Beasley	Labor	Curtin	Minister for Supply and Development	7 October 1941	17 October 1942	3 years, 118 days
5	Jack Beasley	Labor	Curtin	Minister for Supply and Shipping	17 October 1942	2 February 1945	3 years, 118 days
6	Bill Ashley	Labor	Curtin	Minister for Supply and Shipping	2 February 1945	6 July 1945	3 years, 64 days
6	Bill Ashley	Labor	Forde	Minister for Supply and Shipping	6 July 1945	13 July 1945	3 years, 64 days
6	Bill Ashley	Labor	Chifley	Minister for Supply and Shipping	13 July 1945	6 April 1948	3 years, 64 days
7	John Armstrong	Labor	Chifley	Minister for Supply and Development	6 April 1948	19 December 1949	1 year, 257 days
(1)	Richard Casey, CH, DSO, MC	Liberal	Menzies	Minister for Supply and Development	19 December 1949	17 March 1950	88 days
8	Howard Beale	Liberal	Menzies	Minister for Supply	17 March 1950	10 February 1958	7 years, 330 days
9	Athol Townley	Liberal	Menzies	Minister for Supply	11 February 1958	10 December 1958	302 days
10	Alan Hulme	Liberal	Menzies	Minister for Supply	10 December 1958	22 December 1961	3 years, 12 days
11	Allen Fairhall	Liberal	Menzies	Minister for Supply	22 December 1961	26 January 1966	4 years, 35 days
12	Denham Henty	Liberal	Holt	Minister for Supply	26 January 1966	19 December 1967	2 years, 33 days
12	Denham Henty	Liberal	McEwen	Minister for Supply	19 December 1967	10 January 1968	2 years, 33 days
12	Denham Henty	Liberal	Gorton	Minister for Supply	10 January 1968	28 February 1968	2 years, 33 days
13	Sir Ken Anderson	Liberal	Gorton	Minister for Supply	28 February 1968	10 March 1971	3 years, 155 days
13	Sir Ken Anderson	Liberal	McMahon	Minister for Supply	10 March 1971	2 August 1971	3 years, 155 days
14	Victor Garland	Liberal	McMahon	Minister for Supply	2 August 1971	5 December 1972	1 year, 125 days
15	Lance Barnard	Labor	Whitlam	Minister for Supply	5 December 1972	9 October 1973	308 days
16	Kep Enderby, QC	Labor	Whitlam	Minister for Supply	9 October 1973	12 June 1974	246 days
17	Ian Viner, QC	Liberal	Fraser	Minister for Defence Support	7 May 1982	11 March 1983	308 days
18	Brian Howe	Labor	Hawke	Minister for Defence Support	11 March 1983	13 December 1984	1 year, 277 days
19	Ros Kelly	Labor	Hawke	Minister for Defence Science and Personnel	18 September 1987	6 April 1989	1 year, 200 days
20	David Simmons	Labor	Hawke	Minister for Defence Science and Personnel	6 April 1989	4 April 1990	363 days
21	Gordon Bilney	Labor	Hawke	Minister for Defence Science and Personnel	4 April 1990	20 December 1991	2 years, 354 days
21	Gordon Bilney	Labor	Keating	Minister for Defence Science and Personnel	20 December 1991	24 March 1993	2 years, 354 days
22	John Faulkner	Labor	Keating	Minister for Defence Science and Personnel	24 March 1993	25 March 1994	1 year, 1 day
23	Gary Punch	Labor	Keating	Minister for Defence Science and Personnel	25 March 1994	11 March 1996	1 year, 352 days
24	Bronwyn Bishop	Liberal	Howard	Minister for Defence Industry, Science and Personnel	11 March 1996	21 October 1998	2 years, 224 days
25	Warren Snowdon	Labor	Rudd	Minister for Defence Science and Personnel	3 December 2007	9 June 2009	1 year, 188 days
26	Greg Combet, AM	Labor	Rudd	Minister for Defence Personnel, Materiel and Science	9 June 2009	1 April 2010	1 year, 97 days
26	Greg Combet, AM	Labor	Rudd	Minister for Defence Materiel and Science	1 April 2010	24 June 2010	1 year, 97 days
26	Greg Combet, AM	Labor	Gillard	Minister for Defence Materiel and Science	24 June 2010	14 September 2010	1 year, 97 days
27	Jason Clare	Labor	Gillard	Minister for Defence Materiel	14 September 2010	14 December 2011	1 year, 91 days
28	Kim Carr	Labor	Gillard	Minister for Defence Materiel	14 December 2011	5 March 2012	82 days
(27)	Jason Clare	Labor	Gillard	Minister for Defence Materiel	5 March 2012	2 April 2013	1 year, 28 days
29	Mike Kelly, AM	Labor	Gillard	Minister for Defence Materiel	2 April 2013	27 June 2013	169 days
29	Mike Kelly, AM	Labor	Rudd	Minister for Defence Materiel	27 June 2013	18 September 2013	169 days
30	Mal Brough (Note: Minister Mal Brough temporarily stood aside on 29 December 2015. Subsequently, Senator Marise Payne served as Acting Minister for Defence Materiel and Science. Brough later resigned from the Ministry on 13 February 2016 and Payne remained acting in the role until the rearranged ministry was sworn on 18 February 2016.)	Liberal	Turnbull	Minister for Defence Materiel and Science	21 September 2015	29 December 2015	99 days
acting	Marise Payne	Liberal	Turnbull	Acting Minister for Defence Materiel and Science	29 December 2015	18 February 2016	51 days
31	Dan Tehan	Liberal	Turnbull	Minister for Defence Materiel	18 February 2016	19 July 2016	152 days
32	Christopher Pyne	Liberal	Turnbull	Minister for Defence Industry	19 July 2016	24 August 2018	2 years, 39 days
32	Christopher Pyne	Liberal	Morrison	Minister for Defence Industry	24 August 2018	27 August 2018	2 years, 39 days
33	Steven Ciobo	Liberal	Morrison	Minister for Defence Industry	28 August 2018	2 March 2019	186 days
34	Linda Reynolds, CSC	Liberal	Morrison	Minister for Defence Industry	2 March 2019	29 May 2019	88 days
35	Melissa Price	Liberal	Morrison	Minister for Defence Industry	29 May 2019	23 May 2022	2 years, 359 days
36	Pat Conroy	Labor	Albanese	Minister for Defence Industry	1 June 2022	29 July 2024	4 years, 98 days
36	Pat Conroy	Labor	Albanese	Minister for Defence Industry and Capability Delivery	29 July 2024	13 May 2025	4 years, 98 days
36	Pat Conroy	Labor	Albanese	Minister for Defence Industry	13 May 2025	incumbent	4 years, 98 days

== Ministers for Munitions ==
The following individuals have been appointed Minister for Munitions:

Order	Minister	Party	Prime Minister	Title	Term start	Term end	Term in office
1	Robert Menzies	United Australia	Menzies	Minister for Munitions	11 June 1940	28 October 1940	139 days
2	Philip McBride	United Australia	Menzies	Minister for Munitions	28 October 1940	29 August 1941	344 days
2	Philip McBride	United Australia	Fadden	Minister for Munitions	29 August 1941	7 October 1941	344 days
3	Norman Makin	Labor	Curtin	Minister for Munitions	7 October 1941	6 July 1945	4 years, 312 days
3	Norman Makin	Labor	Forde	Minister for Munitions	6 July 1945	13 July 1945	4 years, 312 days
3	Norman Makin	Labor	Chifley	Minister for Munitions	13 July 1945	15 August 1946	4 years, 312 days
4	John Dedman	Labor	Chifley	Minister for Munitions	15 August 1946	1 November 1946	78 days
5	John Armstrong	Labor	Chifley	Minister for Munitions	1 November 1946	6 April 1948	1 year, 157 days

== Ministers for Defence Production ==
The following individuals have been appointed Minister for Defence Production, or any of its precedent titles:

Order	Minister	Party	Prime Minister	Title	Term start	Term end	Term in office
1	John Leckie	United Australia	Menzies	Minister for Aircraft Production	26 June 1941	29 August 1941	103 days
1	John Leckie	United Australia	Fadden	Minister for Aircraft Production	29 August 1941	7 October 1941	103 days
2	Don Cameron	Labor	Curtin	Minister for Aircraft Production	7 October 1941	2 February 1945	3 years, 221 days
3	Norman Makin	Labor	Curtin	Minister for Aircraft Production	2 February 1945	6 July 1945	1 year, 194 days
3	Norman Makin	Labor	Forde	Minister for Aircraft Production	6 July 1945	13 July 1945	1 year, 194 days
3	Norman Makin	Labor	Chifley	Minister for Aircraft Production	13 July 1945	15 August 1946	1 year, 194 days
4	John Dedman	Labor	Chifley	Minister for Aircraft Production	15 August 1946	1 November 1946	78 days
5	Sir Eric Harrison, KCVO	Liberal	Menzies	Minister for Defence Production	11 May 1951	24 October 1956	5 years, 166 days
6	Howard Beale	Liberal	Menzies	Minister for Defence Production	24 October 1956	10 February 1958	1 year, 109 days
7	Athol Townley	Liberal	Menzies	Minister for Defence Production	11 February 1958	23 April 1958	71 days

== See also ==
- Department of Defence (Australia)
- Minister for Defence (Australia)
- Minister for Defence Science and Personnel (Australia)
- Minister for Veterans' Affairs (Australia)
- Defence industry of Australia
