= John Dedman =

Australian politician

The Honourable John Dedman
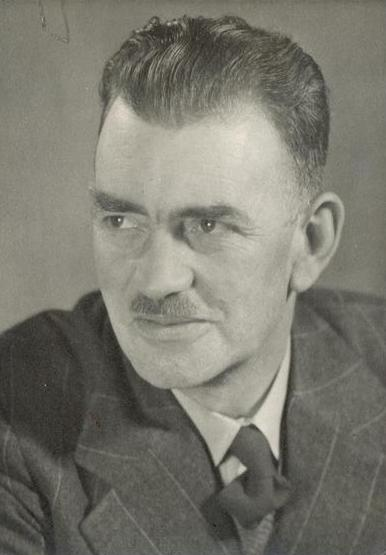

Minister for Defence
- In office 1 November 1946 – 19 December 1949
- Prime Minister: Ben Chifley
- Preceded by: Frank Forde
- Succeeded by: Eric Harrison

Minister for Post-War Reconstruction
- In office 2 February 1945 – 19 December 1949
- Prime Minister: John Curtin; Frank Forde; Ben Chifley
- Preceded by: Ben Chifley
- Succeeded by: Eric Harrison

Minister for War Organisation of Industry
- In office 7 October 1941 – 19 February 1945
- Prime Minister: John Curtin
- Preceded by: Eric Spooner
- Succeeded by: Position abolished

Member of the Australian Parliament for Corio
- In office 2 March 1940 – 10 December 1949
- Preceded by: Richard Casey
- Succeeded by: Hubert Opperman

Personal details
- Born: John Johnstone Dedman; 2 June 1896 Wigtownshire, Scotland
- Died: 22 November 1973 (aged 77) Canberra, Australia
- Party: Australian Labor Party
- Spouse: Jessie Lawson
- Occupation: Farmer

John Johnstone Dedman (2 June 1896 – 22 November 1973) was a Minister in the Australian Labor Party governments led by John Curtin and Ben Chifley. He was responsible for organising production during World War II, establishing the Australian National University, reorganising the Commonwealth Scientific and Industrial Research Organisation (CSIRO) and developing the Snowy Mountains Scheme. Dedman represented the Federal seat of Corio, centred on Geelong between 1940 and 1949.

== Early life ==
Dedman was born in Knowe, northwest of Newton Stewart, Wigtownshire, Scotland. He was educated by his father at village schools and Ewart Boys' High School, Newton Stewart. He enrolled in science at the University of Edinburgh in 1914, but was commissioned in 1915 as an officer in the British Army in World War I and fought at Gallipoli, Egypt and France. He then joined the British Indian Army and fought in Afghanistan and Iraq. In 1922 he resigned and travelled to Australia, where he bought a dairy farm near Launching Place with a friend from school, Walter McEwen. In 1925, he married McEwen's sister, Jessie Lawson.

== Political career ==
In 1927 Dedman stood unsuccessfully as the Country Party candidate for Upper Yarra in the Victorian Legislative Assembly. However, the Country Party helped defeat a bill to establish a milk board in the Legislative Council and, as a result, he joined the Labor Party. Between 1932 and 1934, he unsuccessfully contested one federal and two state seats. He was a councillor on Upper Yarra Shire Council from 1926 to 1939 and its president in 1931 and 1937. In 1938, he studied Keynesian economics at the University of Melbourne.

Dedman won Corio at a by-election in March 1940. In October 1941, he was appointed Minister for War Organisation of Industry and Minister in charge of the Council for Scientific and Industrial Research in the Curtin government and he became a member of the War Cabinet in December 1941. His chief responsibility was to organise production to support the war effort, and he became known as the "minister for austerity".

At the end of World War II, he became Minister in charge of the Council for Scientific and Industrial Research and Minister for Postwar Reconstruction in the Chifley government, where he was responsible for promoting full-employment, retraining ex-service personnel and attempting to rebuild the national economy. In particular he had carriage for preparing the White Paper on Full Employment in Australia, establishing the Commonwealth and State Housing Agreement, the Snowy Mountains Scheme, the Joint Coal Board, the Universities Commission and the Australian National University. From November 1946, Dedman was Minister for Defence.

He narrowly lost Corio to Hubert Opperman in the 1949 election and failed to win it back in 1951 and 1954.

== Later life ==
From 1955 Dedman worked with the World Council of Churches on the resettlement of refugees. He retired to Canberra in 1962 and was appointed to the council of the Australian National University and graduated with a B.A., both in 1966. He died in Canberra, survived by his wife, son and two daughters.

== Honours ==
The Australian National University awarded him an honorary Doctor of Laws in 1964 and named a building after him in 1970. He was to have the John Dedman Parkway in Canberra named after him, but the road plans were renamed prior to completion as the Gungahlin Drive Extension.

Political offices
Preceded by Frank Forde	Minister for Defence; 1946–1949	Succeeded by Eric Harrison
Preceded by Eric Spooner	Minister for War Organisation of Industry; 1941–1945	Abolished
New title	Minister for Postwar Reconstruction; 1945–1949	Succeeded by Eric Harrison
New title	Minister in charge of the Council for Scientific and Industrial Research; 1941–1949	Abolished
Preceded by Richard Keane	Minister for Trade and Customs; 1946	Succeeded by James Fraser
Preceded by Norman Makin	Minister for Munitions; 1946	Succeeded by John Armstrong
Preceded by Norman Makin	Minister for Aircraft Production; 1946	Abolished
Parliament of Australia
Preceded by Richard Casey	Member for Corio; 1940–1949	Succeeded by Hubert Opperman
