= Minister for Veterans' Affairs =

Australian ministerial position

Minister for Veterans’ Affairs
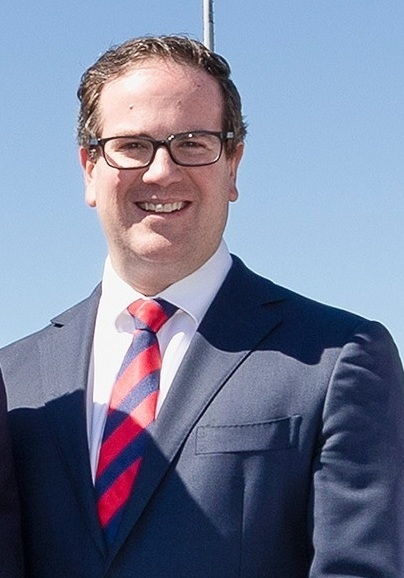
- Incumbent; Matt Keogh since 1 June 2022
- Department of Veterans' Affairs
- Style: The Honourable
- Appointer: Governor-General on the recommendation of the Prime Minister of Australia
- Inaugural holder: Edward Millen (as Minister for Repatriation)
- Formation: 28 September 1917
- Website: minister.dva.gov.au/minister-veterans-affairs

The Minister for Veterans' Affairs is an Australian Government position. In the Government of Australia, the minister oversees income support, compensation, care and commemoration programs for more than 400,000 veterans and their widows, widowers and dependants; and administers the portfolio through the Department of Veterans' Affairs. Since 2017 the office has been held in conjunction with the Minister for Defence Personnel.

== Scope ==
The minister is also responsible for the following agencies:

- Australian War Memorial
- Military Rehabilitation and Compensation Commission
- Office of Australian War Graves
- Repatriation Commission
- Repatriation Medical Authority
- Review of Service Delivery Arrangements
- Specialist Medical Review Council
- Veterans' Review Board
- Vietnam Veterans Counselling Service

== List of ministers ==
=== Veterans' affairs ===
The portfolio was created by Billy Hughes. It was called Minister for Repatriation from the appointment of the first Minister, Edward Millen on 28 September 1917 to deal with ex-soldiers returning from World War I. Stanley Bruce chose not to include a Minister for Repatriation in his ministry (1923–29), but his successor James Scullin restored it, and it has continued ever since, under different names. Gough Whitlam changed the portfolio title to Minister for Repatriation and Compensation in 1974; Malcolm Fraser restored it to its original title in 1975, and then changed it to Minister for Veterans' Affairs on 5 October 1976, Peter Durack being the last minister under the old title and the first under the new.

The following individuals have been appointed as Minister for Veterans' Affairs, or any of its precedent titles:

Order	Minister	Party	Prime Minister	Title	Term start	Term end	Term in office
1	Edward Millen	Nationalist	Hughes	Minister for Repatriation	28 September 1917	9 February 1923	5 years, 134 days
2	Frank Anstey	Labor	Scullin	Minister for Repatriation	22 October 1929	3 March 1931	1 year, 132 days
3	John McNeill	Labor	Scullin	Minister for Repatriation	3 March 1931	6 January 1932	309 days
4	Charles Hawker	United Australia	Lyons	Minister for Repatriation	6 January 1932	12 April 1932	97 days
5	Charles Vukovich	United Australia	Lyons	Minister for Repatriation	12 April 1932	12 October 1934	2 years, 183 days
6	Billy Hughes	United Australia	Lyons	Minister for Repatriation	12 October 1934	6 November 1935	1 year, 25 days
7	Joseph Lyons	United Australia	Lyons	Minister for Repatriation	8 November 1935	6 February 1936	90 days
n/a	Billy Hughes	United Australia	Lyons	Minister for Repatriation	6 February 1936	29 November 1937	1 year, 296 days
8	Harry Foll	United Australia	Lyons	Minister for Repatriation	29 November 1937	7 April 1939	1 year, 148 days
8	Harry Foll	United Australia	Page	Minister for Repatriation	7 April 1939	26 April 1939	1 year, 148 days
9	Eric Harrison	United Australia	Menzies	Minister for Repatriation	26 April 1939	14 March 1940	323 days
10	Geoffrey Street	United Australia	Menzies	Minister for Repatriation	14 March 1940	13 August 1940	152 days
11	Philip McBride	United Australia	Menzies	Minister for Repatriation	14 August 1940	28 October 1940	75 days
12	George McLeay	United Australia	Menzies	Minister for Repatriation	28 October 1940	26 June 1941	241 days
13	Herbert Collett	United Australia	Menzies	Minister for Repatriation	26 June 1941	29 August 1941	103 days
13	Herbert Collett	United Australia	Fadden	Minister for Repatriation	29 August 1941	7 October 1941	103 days
14	Charles Frost	Labor	Curtin	Minister for Repatriation	7 October 1941	6 July 1945	5 years, 25 days
14	Charles Frost	Labor	Forde	Minister for Repatriation	6 July 1945	13 July 1945	5 years, 25 days
14	Charles Frost	Labor	Chifley	Minister for Repatriation	13 July 1945	1 November 1946	5 years, 25 days
15	Claude Barnard	Labor	Chifley	Minister for Repatriation	1 November 1946	19 December 1949	3 years, 48 days
16	Walter Cooper	Country	Menzies	Minister for Repatriation	19 December 1949	29 December 1960	11 years, 10 days
17	Frederick Osborne	Liberal	Menzies	Minister for Repatriation	29 December 1960	22 December 1961	358 days
18	Reginald Swartz	Liberal	Menzies	Minister for Repatriation	22 December 1961	22 December 1964	3 years, 0 days
19	Colin McKellar	Country	Menzies	Minister for Repatriation	22 December 1964	26 January 1966	4 years, 325 days
19	Colin McKellar	Country	Holt	Minister for Repatriation	26 January 1966	19 December 1967	4 years, 325 days
19	Colin McKellar	Country	McEwen	Minister for Repatriation	19 December 1967	10 January 1968	4 years, 325 days
19	Colin McKellar	Country	Gorton	Minister for Repatriation	10 January 1968	12 November 1969	4 years, 325 days
20	Mac Holten	Country	Gorton	Minister for Repatriation	12 November 1969	10 March 1971	3 years, 23 days
20	Mac Holten	Country	McMahon	Minister for Repatriation	10 March 1971	5 December 1972	3 years, 23 days
21	Lance Barnard^{1}	Labor	Whitlam	Minister for Repatriation	5 December 1972	19 December 1972	14 days
22	Reg Bishop	Labor	Whitlam	Minister for Repatriation	19 December 1972	12 June 1974	1 year, 175 days
23	John Wheeldon	Labor	Whitlam	Minister for Repatriation and Compensation	12 June 1974	11 November 1975	1 year, 152 days
24	Don Chipp	Liberal	Fraser	Minister for Repatriation and Compensation	11 November 1975	22 December 1975	41 days
25	Kevin Newman	Liberal	Fraser	Minister for Repatriation	22 December 1975	8 July 1976	199 days
26	Peter Durack	Liberal	Fraser	Minister for Repatriation	8 July 1976	5 October 1976	1 year, 60 days
26	Peter Durack	Liberal	Fraser	Minister for Veterans' Affairs	5 October 1976	6 September 1977	1 year, 60 days
26	Victor Garland^{2}	Liberal	Fraser	Minister for Veterans' Affairs	6 September 1977	4 July 1978	301 days
27	Evan Adermann	Nationals	Fraser	Minister for Veterans' Affairs	4 July 1978	3 November 1980	2 years, 122 days
28	Tony Messner	Liberal	Fraser	Minister for Veterans' Affairs	3 November 1980	11 March 1983	2 years, 128 days
29	Arthur Gietzelt	Labor	Hawke	Minister for Veterans' Affairs	11 March 1983	24 July 1987	4 years, 135 days
30	Ben Humphreys	Labor	Hawke	Minister for Veterans' Affairs	24 July 1987	20 December 1991	5 years, 243 days
30	Ben Humphreys	Labor	Keating	Minister for Veterans' Affairs	20 December 1991	24 March 1993	5 years, 243 days
31	John Faulkner	Labor	Keating	Minister for Veterans' Affairs	24 March 1993	25 March 1994	1 year, 1 day
32	Con Sciacca	Labor	Keating	Minister for Veterans' Affairs	25 March 1994	11 March 1996	1 year, 352 days
33	Bruce Scott	Nationals	Howard	Minister for Veterans' Affairs	11 March 1996	26 November 2001	5 years, 260 days
35	Danna Vale	Liberal	Howard	Minister for Veterans' Affairs	26 November 2001	26 October 2004	2 years, 335 days
36	De-Anne Kelly	Nationals	Howard	Minister for Veterans' Affairs	26 October 2004	27 January 2006	1 year, 93 days
37	Bruce Billson	Liberal	Howard	Minister for Veterans' Affairs	27 January 2006	3 December 2007	1 year, 310 days
38	Alan Griffin	Labor	Rudd	Minister for Veterans' Affairs	3 December 2007	24 June 2010	2 years, 284 days
38	Alan Griffin	Labor	Gillard	Minister for Veterans' Affairs	24 June 2010	13 September 2010	2 years, 284 days
39	Warren Snowdon	Labor	Gillard	Minister for Veterans' Affairs	13 September 2010	1 July 2013	3 years, 5 days
39	Warren Snowdon	Labor	Rudd	Minister for Veterans' Affairs	1 July 2013	18 September 2013	3 years, 5 days
40	Michael Ronaldson	Liberal	Abbott	Minister for Veterans' Affairs	18 September 2013	15 September 2015	2 years, 3 days
40	Michael Ronaldson	Liberal	Turnbull	Minister for Veterans' Affairs	15 September 2015	21 September 2015	2 years, 3 days
41	Stuart Robert	Liberal	Turnbull	Minister for Veterans' Affairs	21 September 2015	18 February 2016	150 days
42	Dan Tehan	Liberal	Turnbull	Minister for Veterans' Affairs	18 February 2016	20 December 2017	1 year, 305 days
43	Michael McCormack	Nationals	Turnbull	Minister for Veterans' Affairs	20 December 2017	5 March 2018	68 days
44	Darren Chester	Nationals	Turnbull	Minister for Veterans' Affairs	5 March 2018	28 August 2018	3 years, 119 days
44	Darren Chester	Nationals	Morrison	Minister for Veterans' Affairs	28 August 2018	2 July 2021	3 years, 119 days
45	Andrew Gee	Nationals	Morrison	Minister for Veterans' Affairs	2 July 2021	23 May 2022	325 days
46	Matt Keogh	Labor	Albanese	Minister for Veterans' Affairs	1 June 2022	Incumbent	4 years, 98 days

Notes

^{1} Barnard was part of a two-man ministry that comprised Barnard and Gough Whitlam for fourteen days, until the full ministry was commissioned.
^{2} Malcolm Fraser initially chose Senator Glen Sheil for the portfolio, and he was sworn in as a member of the Federal Executive Council. But before he was sworn in as a minister, Sheil professed his support for the South African apartheid regime, which was very much at odds with the Fraser government's position. Fraser decided not to proceed with Sheil’s appointment to the Ministry, and his appointment as an Executive Councillor was terminated. Garland was appointed in his place.

=== Assisting the prime minister for the centenary of ANZAC ===
Order	Minister	Party	Prime Minister	Title	Term start	Term end	Term in office
1	Warren Snowdon	Labor	Gillard	Minister Assisting the Prime Minister on the Centenary of ANZAC	3 March 2011	27 June 2013	2 years, 199 days
1	Warren Snowdon	Labor	Rudd	Minister Assisting the Prime Minister on the Centenary of ANZAC	27 June 2013	18 September 2013	2 years, 199 days
2	Michael Ronaldson	Liberal	Abbott	Minister Assisting the Prime Minister on the Centenary of ANZAC	18 September 2013	15 September 2015	2 years, 3 days
2	Michael Ronaldson	Liberal	Turnbull	Minister Assisting the Prime Minister on the Centenary of ANZAC	15 September 2015	21 September 2015	2 years, 3 days
3	Stuart Robert	Liberal	Turnbull	Minister Assisting the Prime Minister on the Centenary of ANZAC	21 September 2015	18 February 2016	150 days
4	Dan Tehan	Liberal	Turnbull	Minister Assisting the Prime Minister on the Centenary of ANZAC	18 February 2016	20 December 2017	1 year, 305 days
5	Michael McCormack	National	Turnbull	Minister Assisting the Prime Minister on the Centenary of ANZAC	20 December 2017	5 March 2018	75 days
6	Darren Chester	National	Turnbull	Minister Assisting the Prime Minister on the Centenary of ANZAC	5 March 2018	28 August 2018	1 year, 85 days
6	Darren Chester	National	Morrison	Minister Assisting the Prime Minister on the Centenary of ANZAC	28 August 2018	29 May 2019	1 year, 85 days

=== War service homes ===
Between 1932 and 1938 there was also a Minister in charge of War Service Homes, responsible for the War Service Homes Scheme. This position was revived with Herbert Collett's appointment as Minister without portfolio administering War Service Homes in 1939, but was subsumed by Bert Lazzarini's appointment as Minister for Works and Housing in 1945.

The following individuals have been appointed as Minister in charge of War Service Homes, or any of its precedent titles:

Order	Minister	Party	Prime Minister	Title	Term start	Term end	Term in office
1	Josiah Francis	United Australia	Lyons	Minister in charge of War Service Homes	6 January 1932	9 November 1934	2 years, 307 days
2	Harold Thorby	Country	Lyons	Minister without portfolio in charge of War Service Homes	9 November 1934	11 September 1936	1 year, 307 days
3	James Hunter	Country	Lyons	Minister without portfolio in charge of War Service Homes	11 September 1936	29 November 1937	1 year, 79 days
4	Harry Foll	United Australia	Lyons	Minister in charge of War Service Homes	29 November 1937	7 November 1938	343 days
5	Herbert Collett	United Australia	Menzies	Minister without portfolio administering War Service Homes	26 April 1939	14 March 1940	2 years, 61 days
5	Herbert Collett	United Australia	Menzies	Minister without portfolio in charge of War Service Homes	14 March 1940	13 August 1940	2 years, 61 days
5	Herbert Collett	United Australia	Menzies	Minister in charge of War Service Homes	14 August 1940	28 October 1940	2 years, 61 days
5	Herbert Collett	United Australia	Menzies	Minister without portfolio administering War Service Homes	28 October 1940	26 June 1941	2 years, 61 days
6	Charles Frost	Labor	Curtin	Minister in charge of War Service Homes	7 October 1941	6 July 1945	3 years, 279 days
6	Charles Frost	Labor	Forde	Minister in charge of War Service Homes	6 July 1945	13 July 1945	3 years, 279 days

== List of assistant ministers ==
Order	Minister	Party	Prime Minister	Title	Term start	Term end	Term in office
1	Matt Thistlethwaite	Labor	Albanese	Assistant Minister for the Veterans' Affairs	1 June 2022	29 July 2024	2 years, 58 days

== See also ==
- Minister for Veterans (Victoria)
- Minister for Veterans (New South Wales)
- Minister for Veterans (Western Australia)
