= Records of prime ministers of Australia =

This page details numerous records and characteristics of individuals who have held the office of Prime Minister of Australia.

== Period of service ==
=== Time in office ===
Sir Robert Menzies was the longest-serving prime minister of Australia, serving for 18 years and 163 days total. His first tenure (1939–1941) lasted 2 years and 125 days and his second tenure (1949–1966) 16 years and 38 days. Menzies’ second term of over 16 years was the longest single term. This term is also longer than the accumulated period of terms of any other prime minister. The shortest-serving prime minister was Frank Forde, who served in the position in an interim capacity for one week in July 1945 after the death of John Curtin. The prime minister with the longest time between the beginning of the first and end of the last terms was also Menzies, with over 25 years between those dates.

=== Number of terms ===
If a “term” is defined as a contiguous period served as prime minister, both Alfred Deakin and Andrew Fisher served the greatest number of terms, with three each. Robert Menzies and Kevin Rudd both served two separate terms as prime ministers. If a “term” is defined as a period of office separated by an election, Robert Menzies served the most terms, winning eight terms.

== Terms of prime ministers and reigns of monarchs of Australia ==
The office of Prime Minister of Australia has existed under the reigns of seven monarchs since Federation in 1901.

=== Number of monarchs served under ===
Joseph Lyons is the only prime minister to have served under three monarchs during one term (Lyons died in 1939):

- George V, (1932–1936)
- Edward VIII, (1936)
- George VI, (1936–1939)

Through being in office at transitions between reigns, four prime ministers each served under two monarchs. These include:

- Edmund Barton (Victoria and Edward VII)
- Andrew Fisher (Edward VII and George V)
- Robert Menzies (George VI and Elizabeth II)
- Anthony Albanese (Elizabeth II and Charles III)

Queen Elizabeth II had by far the greatest number of prime ministers serve her during her reign, being 16. In descending numerical order, numbers of prime ministers in office during all monarch's reigns are:

- Elizabeth II (1952–2022) – sixteen, from Menzies to Albanese
- George VI (1936–1952) – seven, from Lyons to Menzies
- George V (1910–1936) – six, from Fisher to Lyons
- Edward VII (1901–1910) – five, from Barton to Fisher
- Charles III (2022–present) – one (Albanese)
- Edward VIII (1936) – one (Lyons)
- Victoria (1901) – one (Barton)

=== Prime ministers born during reigns in which they held office ===
Only seven prime ministers came to serve office under sovereigns in whose own reigns they were born in. The present prime minister, Anthony Albanese, was the sixth prime minister to have been born in the reign of Elizabeth II.

Queen Victoria (reigned 1837–1901)

- Edmund Barton (born 1849, served 1901–1903)

Queen Elizabeth II (reigned 1952–2022)

- Malcolm Turnbull (born 1954, served 2015–2018)
- Kevin Rudd (born 1957, served 2007–2010, 2013)
- Tony Abbott (born 1957, served 2013–2015)
- Julia Gillard (born 1961, served 2010–2013)
- Anthony Albanese (born 1963, served 2022–present)
- Scott Morrison (born 1968, served 2018–2022)

Morrison has the additional distinction of being younger than all of his monarch's children.

=== Prime ministers who lived under most reigns ===
Billy Hughes (1862–1952), Stanley Bruce (1883–1967), James Scullin (1876–1953), Earle Page (1880–1961), Robert Menzies (1894–1978), Arthur Fadden (1894–1973), Frank Forde (1890–1983), and John McEwen (1900–1980) all lived under the reigns of six sovereigns: Victoria, Edward VII, George V, Edward VIII, George VI and Elizabeth II.

=== Number of governors-general served under ===
Robert Menzies is the only prime minister to have served under six governors-general during his time in office (1939–1941, 1949–1966):

- Lord Gowrie, (1939–1945)
- William McKell, (1949–1953)
- William Slim, (1953–1960)
- Viscount Dunrossil, (1960–1961)
- Viscount De L'Isle, (1961–1965)
- Lord Casey, (1965–1966)

Two prime ministers each served under three governors-general. These include:

- Malcolm Fraser (John Kerr, Zelman Cowen, and Ninian Stephen)
- John Howard (William Deane, Peter Hollingworth, and Michael Jeffery)

Lord Gowrie has the distinction of having the greatest number of prime ministers serve during his term, being 5:

- Joseph Lyons, (1936–1939)
- Earle Page, (1939)
- Robert Menzies, (1939–1941)
- Arthur Fadden, (1941)
- John Curtin, (1941–1945)

Lord Casey follows with 4:

- Robert Menzies, (1965–1966)
- Harold Holt, (1966–1967)
- John McEwen, (1967–1968)
- John Gorton, (1968–1969)

Six governors general each had three prime ministers serve during their term. These include:

- Lord Northcote (Alfred Deakin, Chris Watson, and George Reid)
- Sir Ronald Munro Ferguson (Andrew Fisher, Joseph Cook, and Billy Hughes)
- Prince Henry, Duke of Gloucester (John Curtin, Frank Forde, and Ben Chifley)
- Paul Hasluck (John Gorton, William McMahon, and Gough Whitlam)
- Quentin Bryce (Kevin Rudd, Julia Gillard, and Tony Abbott)
- Peter Cosgrove (Tony Abbott, Malcolm Turnbull, and Scott Morrison)

== Age ==
=== Age of appointment ===
The youngest prime minister upon appointment by the governor-general was Chris Watson, who was 37 years, and 18 days old when his term began on 27 April 1904. The oldest prime minister upon appointment was John McEwen, who was 67 years, and 265 days old when he took office in a temporary capacity on 17 December 1967.

=== Age on leaving office ===
The youngest prime minister to leave office was also Watson, who left office only four months after he was appointed at the age of 37 years, and 131 days. The oldest prime minister to leave office was Menzies, who was 71 years and 37 days old when he stepped down on 26 January 1966.

=== Age differences between incoming and outgoing prime ministers ===
The largest age gap between an incoming prime minister and outgoing one was 22 years and 44 days between Chris Watson and George Reid during 1904. In recent years, the largest age gap between an incoming prime minister and outgoing one was 18 years and 57 days between John Howard and Kevin Rudd during 2007. The smallest age gap between an incoming prime minister and outgoing one was 27 days between Andrew Fisher and Billy Hughes during 1915. In recent years, the smallest age gap between an incoming prime minister and outgoing one was 44 days between Kevin Rudd and Tony Abbott during 2013.

=== Longest lived ===
The longest-lived prime minister was Gough Whitlam, who lived for 98 years and 102 days (1916–2014)

=== Shortest lived ===
The shortest-lived prime minister was Harold Holt, born 1908, who died in office at age 59 years and 134 days in 1967.

=== Longest retirement ===
The longest period of retirement (retirement being the period between the end of their last term and their death) for a prime minister was Whitlam's, which was 38 years, 344 days long (1975–2014).

=== Shortest retirement ===
The shortest period of retirement was Ben Chifley, who died in 1951, 1 year and 176 days after he left office.

=== Intervals between terms of office ===
Of the prime ministers who have served more than one term, the largest interval was that of Menzies, which lasted 10 years from 1939 to 1949.

== Birthplace ==
Of the 31 prime ministers, 24 have been born in Australia. Of the ones that were not born in Australia, six were born in the United Kingdom:

- Reid and Fisher were born in Scotland
- Cook, Hughes and Abbott were born in England
- Gillard was born in Wales
- Watson was born in Chile.

Of the 24 prime ministers born within Australia:

- Nine have been born in modern-day Victoria in total. Six were born in colonial Victoria (Deakin, Bruce, Scullin, Menzies, Curtin and McEwen). Three have been born in Victoria in federated Australia (Gorton, Whitlam, and Fraser).
- Ten have been born in modern-day New South Wales. Three were born in colonial New South Wales (Barton, Page, and Chifley) and seven were born in modern New South Wales (Holt, McMahon, Keating, Howard, Turnbull, Morrison, and Albanese).
- Three have been born in modern-day Queensland. Two of those were born in colonial Queensland (Fadden and Forde) and one in Queensland as its own state (Rudd).
- One (Hawke) was born in post-federation South Australia.
- One (Lyons) was born in colonial Tasmania

Some prime ministers represented electorates in states other than they were born in.

== Federal elections ==
=== Most prime ministers in office between federal elections ===
There have been three periods between elections in which three prime ministers were in office.

- Between the 1903 election and 1906 election, Deakin, Watson and Reid all took the office before Deakin regained it for the 1906 election after several parliamentary confidence shuffles between parties.
- Between the 1940 election and 1943 election, Menzies, Fadden and Curtin held the office after the House of Representatives lost confidence in the United Australia Party coalition.
- Between the 1943 election and 1946 election, Curtin held the office until his death, when Forde temporarily took the office and Chifley was elected as the leader of the Labor Party.
- Between the 1966 election and 1969 election, Holt held the office before McEwen took it over after his death and Gorton ultimately succeeded him.

=== Most elections contested ===
The largest number of elections contested by a prime minister is nine. Menzies contested the 1940, 1946, 1949, 1951, 1954, 1955, 1958, 1961, and 1963 elections. The greatest number of elections won by a prime minister is eight, a record also held by Menzies, who won 8 of the 9 elections he contested. The greatest number of elections lost by an individual is three, George Reid, H. V. Evatt, Arthur Calwell, and Gough Whitlam all lost three federal elections.

=== Age at losing an election ===
The oldest prime minister to lose a federal election was John Howard, who lost his own seat and the election of 2007 at 68 years and 121 days old. The oldest person to lose a federal election was Arthur Calwell, who lost the election of 1966 at 70 years and 90 days old. The youngest prime minister to lose a federal election was Stanley Bruce, who was 46 years, and 180 days old when he lost the 1929 election. In recent years, the youngest prime minister to lose a federal election was Paul Keating, who was 52 years and 44 days old when he lost the 1996 election. The youngest person to lose a federal election was Chris Watson who was 36 years and 251 days old when he lost the 1903 election. The youngest person to lose a federal election without ever becoming prime minister was Mark Latham who was 43 years and 223 days old when he lost the 2004 election.

=== Age at winning an election ===
The oldest prime minister to lead a party to victory at a federal election was Robert Menzies, who won the 1963 election aged 68 years and 347 days. The oldest prime minister to lead a party to victory at a federal election for the first time was Malcolm Turnbull, who won the 2016 election aged 61 years and 251 days. The youngest prime minister to win an election was Stanley Bruce, who was 42 years, and 213 days old when he won the 1925 election. In recent years, the youngest prime minister to win an election was Julia Gillard, who was 48 years, and 326 days old when she won the 2010 election.

=== Prime ministers in office without an election ===
Nearly all (24) prime ministers of Australia have held the office at some point during their tenures without the mandates from an election. This is a common occurrence due to the parliamentary and party systems in Australia, when the position is often made vacant by a spill or leader who is resigning or retiring. In the early days of the office, the unstable non-majority party system also caused many changes in power. Prime ministers who have taken office due to inter-party confidence prior to the development of the stable two-party system:

- Chris Watson
- George Reid
- Alfred Deakin (second and third tenures)
- Andrew Fisher (first tenure)

Prime ministers who took office after their predecessors resigned:

- Alfred Deakin (first tenure)
- Stanley Bruce
- Robert Menzies (first tenure)
- Arthur Fadden
- Ben Chifley
- John Gorton

Prime ministers who took office after their predecessors retired:

- Billy Hughes
- Harold Holt

Prime ministers who took office after their predecessors died:

- Earle Page
- Frank Forde
- John McEwen

Prime ministers who took office after defeating the government in a vote of no confidence:

- John Curtin

Prime ministers who took office after defeating their predecessors in a party spill:

- William McMahon
- Paul Keating
- Julia Gillard
- Kevin Rudd (second tenure)
- Malcolm Turnbull

Prime minister who took office after the incumbent government was dismissed by the Governor-General:

- Malcolm Fraser

=== Prime ministers who lost their own seat ===
S. M. Bruce (1929) and John Howard (2007) are the only incumbent prime ministers to lose their own seat at a federal election, in both cases as part of their government's defeat. Frank Forde (1946) is the only other prime minister to lose his seat at the end of a parliamentary term in which he had been prime minister.

James Scullin (1913) and John Curtin (1931) lost their parliamentary seats before becoming prime minister, but were subsequently re-elected to parliament. Earle Page (1961) and Tony Abbott (2019) lost their parliamentary seats several terms after the conclusion of their terms as prime minister.

== Service to Parliament ==
=== Service in the Senate ===
Only John Gorton has come from the Senate. He served as a senator for Victoria for 17 years before he contested and won Harold Holt’s seat of Higgins in the House of Representatives.

=== Service in the House of Representatives ===
The shortest interval between entering Parliament and being appointed prime minister was achieved by Bob Hawke, who entered Parliament in October 1980 and was appointed prime minister only 29 months later in March 1983. The longest period of service prior to becoming prime minister was that of John McEwen, who had served 33 years in the House of Representatives before he became prime minister in December 1967. For a non-interim prime minister, the longest period of prior service was 30 years by Harold Holt, who was elected in a by-election in August 1935 and became prime minister in January 1966. The longest service as an MP of a prime minister was Billy Hughes, who served from March 1901 until his death in October 1952, a total of 51 years. This is to date the longest period of service in the Australian Parliament and Hughes was father of the House from 1938 until 1952. The prime minister with the longest service in a single seat is 42 years by Earle Page, who served the seat of Cowper from December 1919 until December 1961. In recent years, the prime minister with the longest service in a single seat is 33 years by John Howard, who served the seat of Bennelong from May 1974 until December 2007.

=== Prime ministers who were Fathers of the House ===
Only one prime minister has held both that office and been Father of the House: John McEwen, from December 1967 until January 1968. Five prime ministers have served a long enough period in the House of Representatives to become Father of the House: Italics indicate that a former or incumbent prime minister was a joint Father of the House.

Name	Entered House	Prime Minister	Became Father	Left House	Party	Constituency
Billy Hughes	1901	1915–1923	1938	1952 (died)	Liberal	West Sydney (1901–1917); Bendigo (1917–1922); North Sydney (1922–1949); Bradfield (1949–1951)
Sir Earle Page	1919	1939	1952	1961 (lost seat)	National	Cowper
Sir Robert Menzies	1934	1939–1941, 1949–1966	1965	1966 (resigned)	Liberal	Kooyong
Sir John McEwen	1934	1967–1968	1965	1971 (resigned)	National	Echuca (1934–1937); Indi (1937–1949); Murray (1949–1971)
Sir William McMahon	1949	1971–1972	1981	1982 (resigned)	Liberal	Lowe
Malcolm Fraser	1955	1975–1983	1982	1983 (resigned)	Liberal	Wannon

== Ancestry ==
As of 2026, all 31 prime ministers of Australia have been white European Australians. The vast majority of them have been Anglo-Celtic Australians, tracing their ancestry to England, Ireland, and/or Scotland. Additionally, Alfred Deakin and Billy Hughes had some Welsh ancestry. Julia Gillard was born in Wales to Welsh parents, and is of almost exclusively Welsh descent.

Only four prime ministers are known to have been at least partly of non-Anglo-Celtic descent: Chris Watson, whose father was a German Chilean; Harold Holt, whose maternal grandmother was German; Malcolm Fraser, whose maternal grandfather was a Jewish New Zealander; and Anthony Albanese, whose father was Italian.

== Religion ==
Most Australian prime ministers have been Christian.

=== Agnostic/Atheist ===
- Bob Hawke (1983–1991); born to a Congregationalist minister He subsequently abandoned his Christian beliefs. By the time he entered politics he was a self-described agnostic.
- Julia Gillard (2010–2013); as brought up in the Baptist tradition, but is an atheist. In a 2010 interview, when asked if she believed in God, she stated: "No, I don't ... I'm not a religious person ... I'm a great respecter of religious beliefs but they're not my beliefs."
- Malcolm Turnbull (2015–2018); was agnostic for a lengthy period before becoming prime minister.

=== Catholic ===
- James Scullin (1929–1932); was Australia's first Catholic prime minister.
- Joseph Lyons (1932–1939)
- Frank Forde (1945); born to Irish Catholic parents, Forde was educated at Christian Brothers' school in Toowoomba.
- Ben Chifley (1945–1949)
- Paul Keating (1991–1996)
- Tony Abbott (2013–2015)
- Malcolm Turnbull (2015–2018); raised Presbyterian, Turnbull became agnostic in the beginning of his adult life and later converted to Roman Catholicism "by mid-2002"; his wife's family is Roman Catholic.
- Anthony Albanese (2022–present); born and raised as a Catholic and said in an interview with 60 Minutes Albanese said his faith is very important to him.

=== Protestant ===
==== Anglican ====
- Edmund Barton (1901–1903); as well as being the first prime minister of Australia, Barton was also the first Christian prime minister of the country. He was an Anglican. Barton's wife, Jane Ross, was a Presbyterian and became Anglican upon marriage in 1877.
- Billy Hughes (1915–1923); was a lifelong Anglican. He inherited this affiliation from his maternal side – his father was a Primitive Baptist and a deacon at the Welsh Baptist Church in London, though he wed with Anglican rites.
- Stanley Bruce (1923–1929); was sent to Melbourne Church of England Grammar School (now Melbourne Grammar School) and subsequently Stanley Bruce would come to identify principally as Anglican.
- William McMahon (1971–1972); was an Anglican. He did not have a strong religious upbringing – his father was a lapsed Catholic and self-described "rationalist", while his mother's family were Anglican.
- John Howard (1996–2007); was raised a Methodist but identified with Anglicanism later on in life.
- Kevin Rudd (2007–2010, 2013); although raised a Roman Catholic, Rudd was actively involved in the Evangelical Union while studying at the Australian National University, and he began attending Anglican services in the 1980s with his wife.

==== Methodist ====
- Joseph Cook (1913–1914); born in England and migrating to Australia after marrying in the Wolstanton Primitive Methodist Chapel, Staffordshire, Cook was a Primitive Methodist and lay preacher during his adult life, having become a Methodist during his teen years.
- Earle Page (1939); although Page made very little reference regarding religion in life, he was born into a very active Methodist family and volunteered to become a Methodist medical missionary in the Solomon Islands in 1902.

==== Presbyterian ====
- George Reid (1904–1905); Reid was raised by Presbyterian minister John Reid, educated at the Presbyterian Melbourne Academy (later Scotch College), and was an active member of the Young Men's Presbyterian Union as well as actively attending Presbyterian church.
- Andrew Fisher (1908–1909, 1910–1913, 1914–1915); born into a Scottish Presbyterian family in Ayrshire, Scotland, Fisher was regarded as a highly observant Presbyterian. He was heavily active in the Presbyterian Church in Australia and England.
- Robert Menzies (1949–1966); the son of a Presbyterian-turned-Methodist lay preacher and imbibed his father's Protestant faith and values. During his studies at the University of Melbourne, Menzies served as president of the Students' Christian Union. Proud of his Scottish Presbyterian heritage with a living faith steeped in the Bible.
- Arthur Fadden (1941); nominal Presbyterian; grandfather was a Presbyterian minister and his funeral was in the Toowong Presbyterian Church, Queensland.
- Malcolm Turnbull (2015–2018); was raised Presbyterian.

==== Pentecostal ====
- Scott Morrison (2018–2022); raised in the Presbyterian Church of Australia (PCA), which partly merged into the Uniting Church when he was a child. He became a Pentecostal before entering Parliament in 2007, attending Hillsong Church in Sydney's Baulkham Hills and later the Horizon Church in Sutherland which is affiliated with the Australian Christian Churches, the Australian branch of the Assemblies of God. Morrison is Australia's first Pentecostal prime minister.

=== Unitarianism ===
- Chris Watson (1904);

=== Unspecified or other Christian ===
- Alfred Deakin (1903–1904, 1905–1908, 1909–1910); Deakin's religious affiliation has largely been cited as Christian (Protestant) with no specific church or denomination. In his teens and early adulthood, Deakin practiced and was affiliated with Spiritualism and Swedenborgianism.

== Military service ==
Eight of the thirty-one prime ministers of Australia have served in the military. As of 2020, the last prime minister who had any military service was Gough Whitlam, who served as a pilot in the Air Force from 1941 to 1945, during World War II. Only Harold Holt has served in the military during his parliamentary career. He served in the Armed Forces from 1939 to 1940, when he was asked to return by Menzies due to low parliamentary numbers and difficulties.

== Living prime ministers ==
=== Currently living former prime ministers ===
As of 16 November 2026, there are seven living former Australian prime ministers.

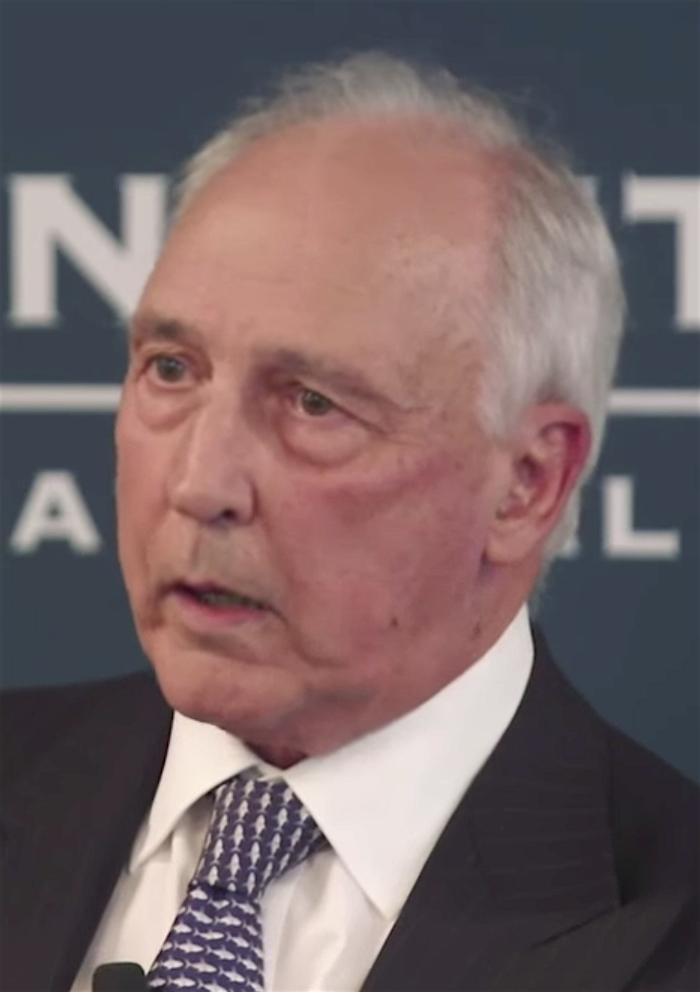
Paul Keating In office: 1991–1996 Age: 82

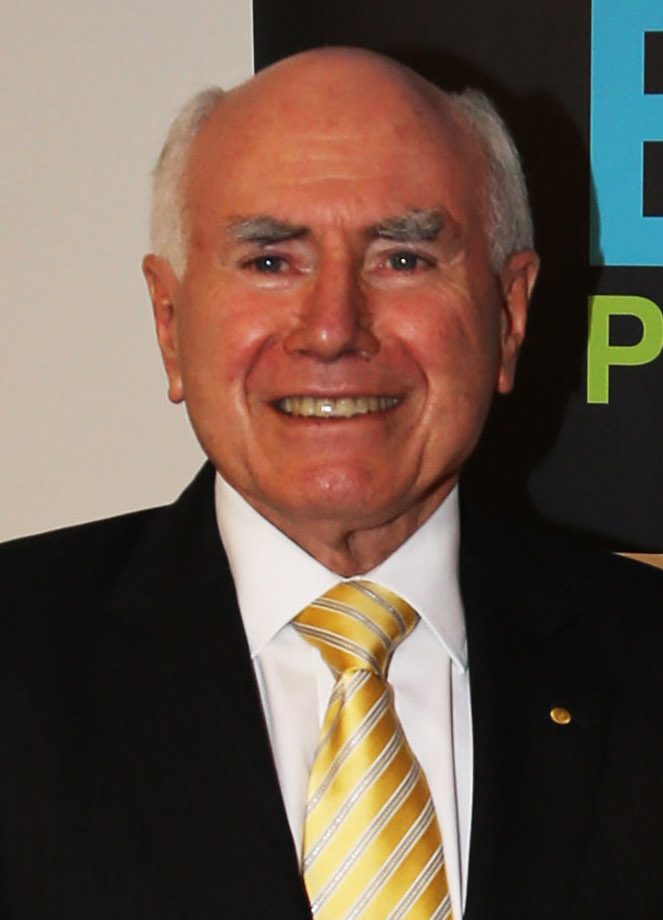
John Howard In office: 1996–2007 Age: 87

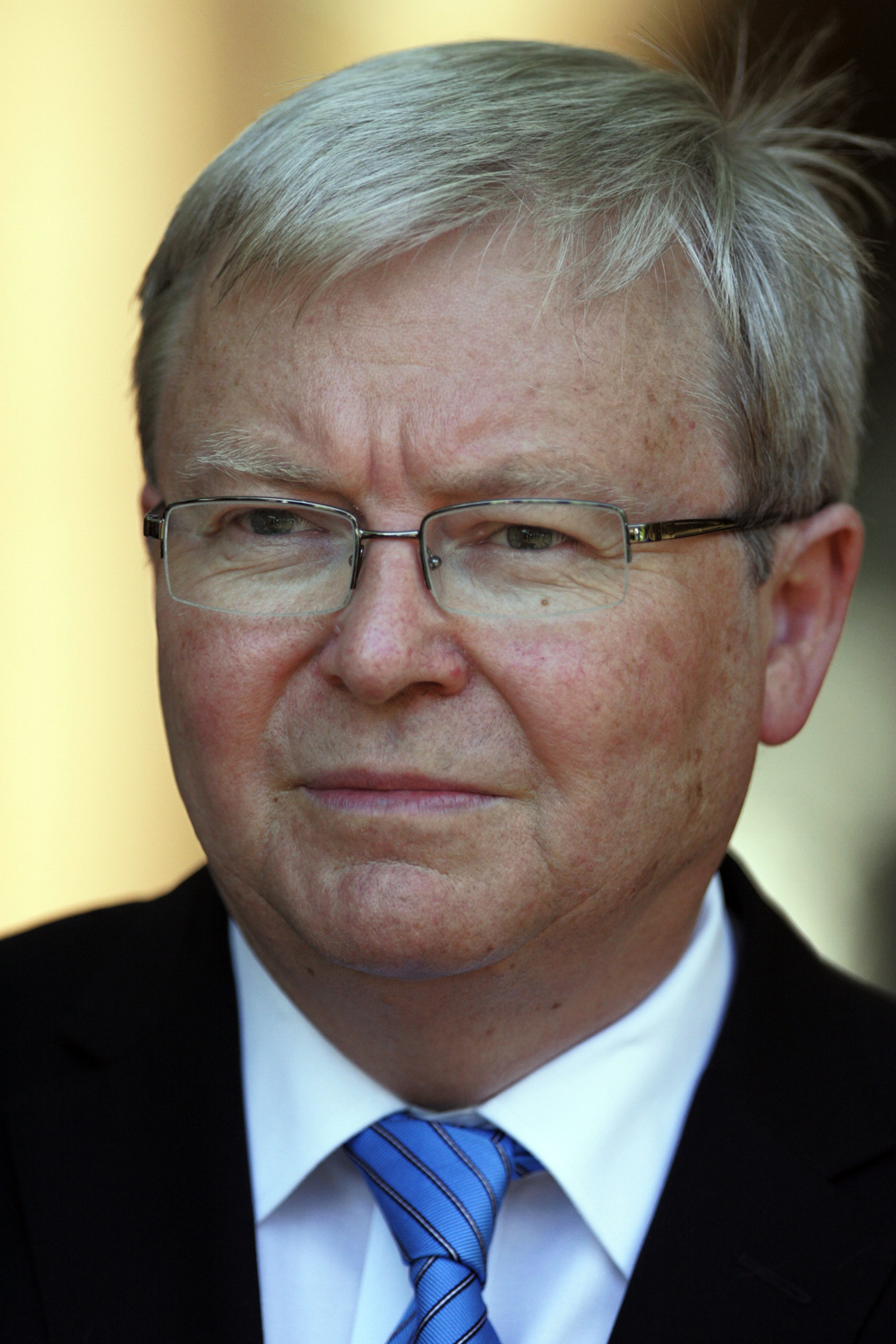
Kevin Rudd In office: 2007–2010; 2013 Age: 69

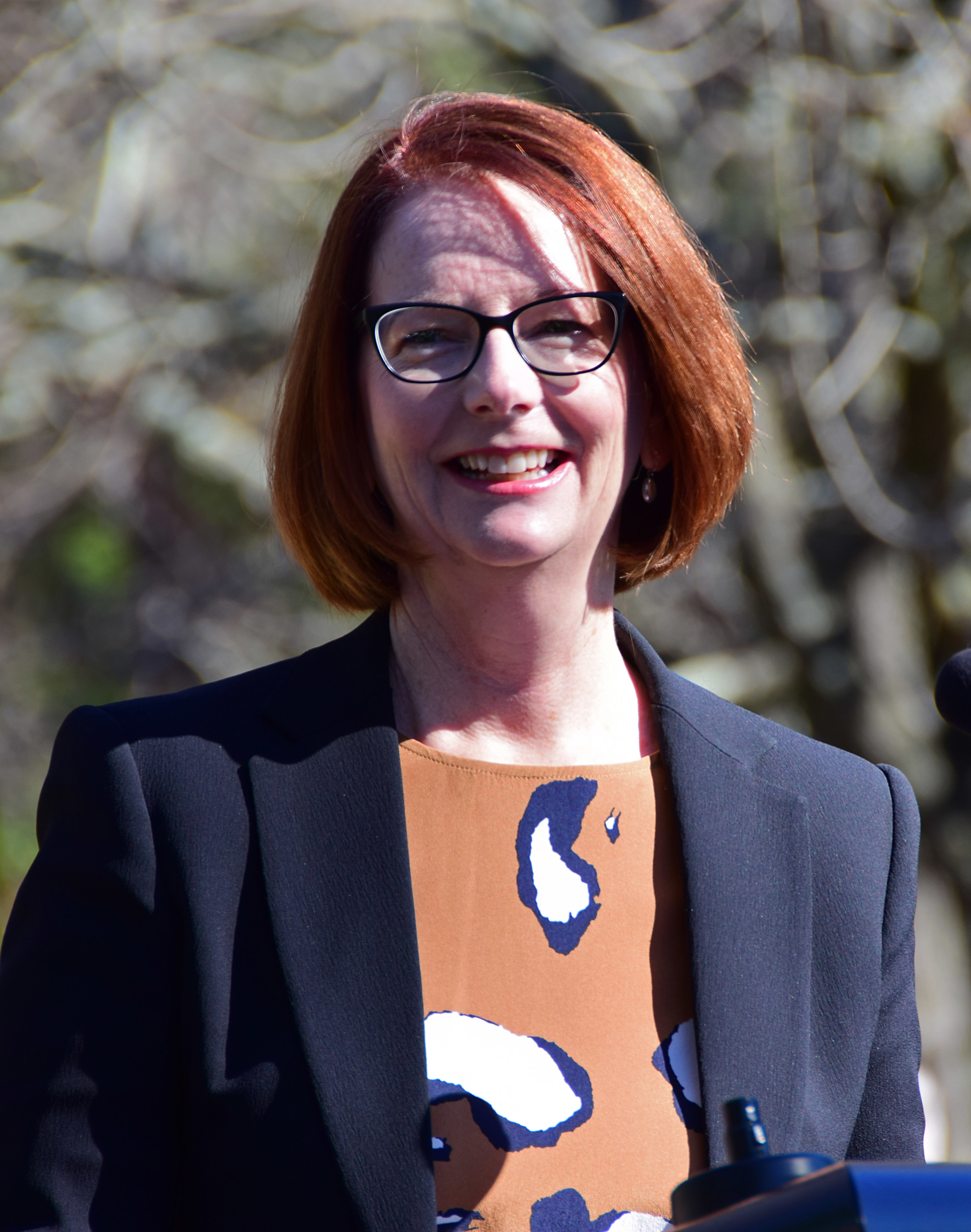
Julia Gillard In office: 2010–2013 Age: 65

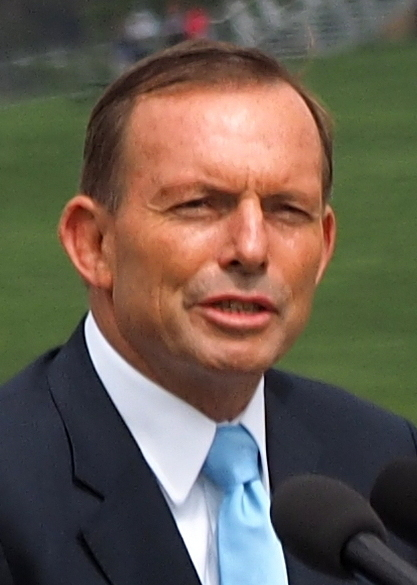
Tony Abbott, In office: 2013–2015 Age: 69

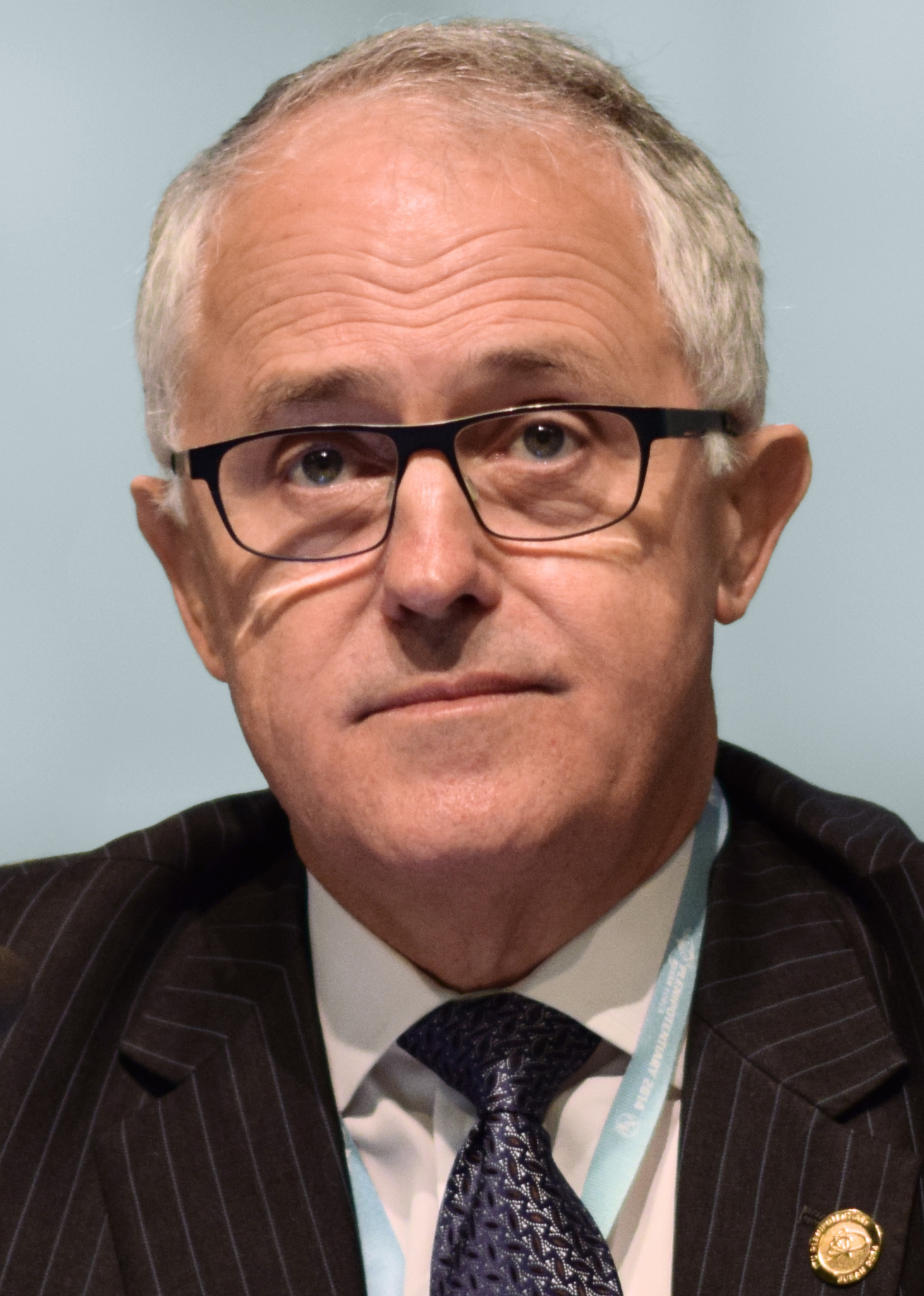
Malcolm Turnbull, In office: 2015–2018 Age: 72

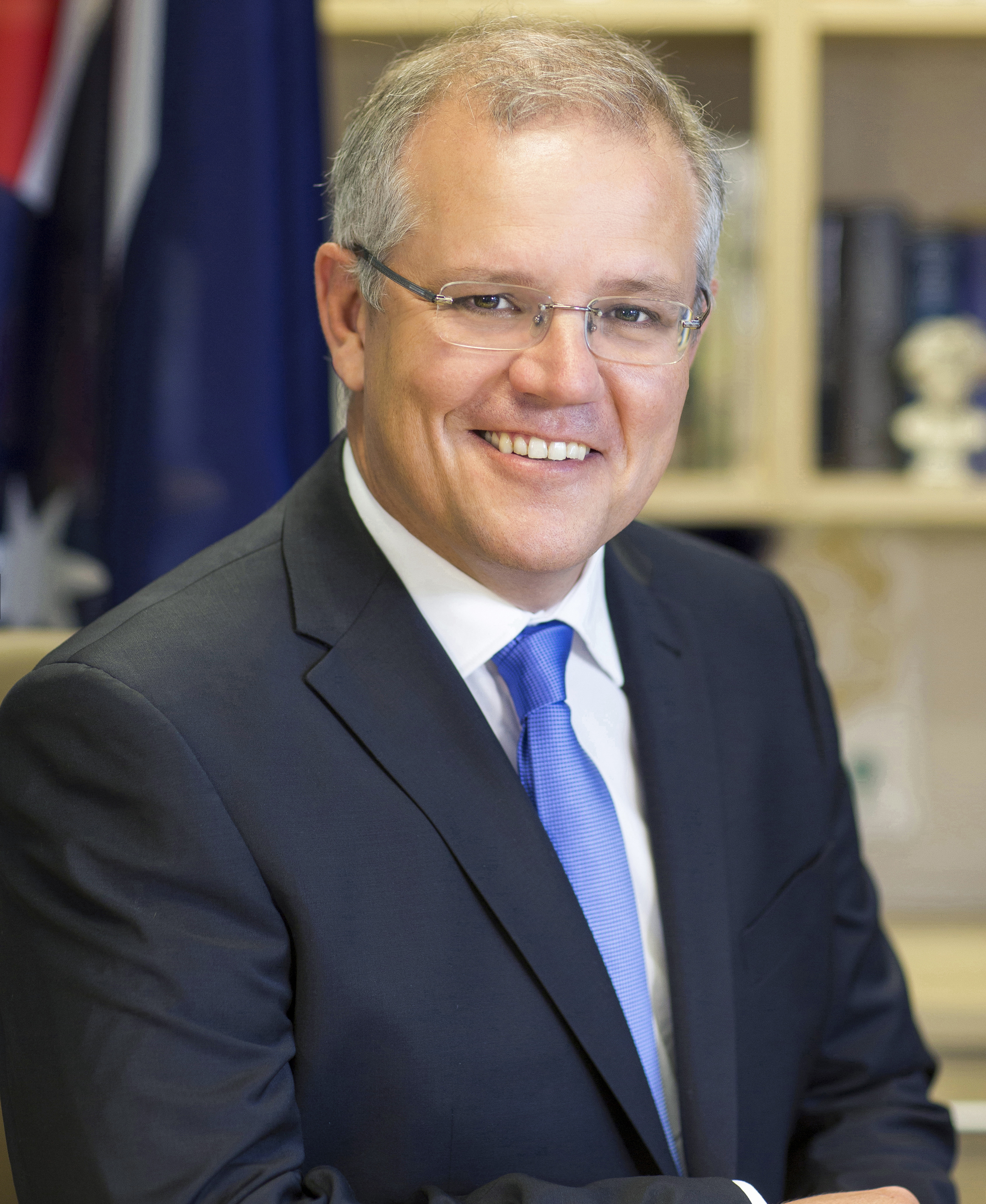
Scott Morrison, In office: 2018–2022 Age: 58

=== Died in office ===
Three prime ministers have died in office:

- Joseph Lyons, who died on 7 April 1939, aged 59
- John Curtin, who died on 5 July 1945, aged 60
- Harold Holt, who disappeared on 17 December 1967 and was declared dead on 19 December, aged 59

=== Died while immediate successor was in office ===
Earle Page and Ben Chifley's successor, Robert Menzies, was in office when Chifley and Page died in 1951 and 1961 respectively.

== Miscellaneous records ==
The prime minister who had the most children is Joseph Lyons, who fathered 12 children.

The tallest prime minister is believed to be Gough Whitlam, who stood at around 6 feet 4 inches (194 cm) in height.

The longest personal name held by an Australian prime minister was that of Earle Page whose four names – Earle Christmas Grafton Page – total 25 letters. The shortest baptismal names, each 10 letters long, were held by John Curtin and John McEwen.

The following prime ministers have had facial hair. Alfred Deakin, Chris Watson, George Reid, Andrew Fisher, Joseph Cook and Billy Hughes. Most prime ministers, when in office, have been predominantly clean-shaven men.

=== By-elections ===
- The fastest prime minister to win a by-election was John Gorton, who won the 1968 Higgins by-election which he contested after only one month in office.
- The fastest prime minister to lose a by-election was Alfred Deakin, who lost the 1904 Melbourne by-election after only six months in office.

== Prime Ministers who sat in cabinet after office ==
Name	Prime Minister		Cabinet post			Prime Minister serving under
Joseph Cook	24 June 1913	17 September 1914	Minister for the Navy	17 February 1917	28 July 1920	Billy Hughes (3rd, 4th and 5th)
Joseph Cook	24 June 1913	17 September 1914	Treasurer	28 July 1920	21 December 1921	Billy Hughes (3rd, 4th and 5th)
Billy Hughes	27 October 1915	9 February 1923				Joseph Lyons (2nd, 3rd and 4th)
Billy Hughes	27 October 1915	9 February 1923				Earle Page (1st)
Billy Hughes	27 October 1915	9 February 1923				Robert Menzies (1st, 2nd and 3rd)
Billy Hughes	27 October 1915	9 February 1923				Arthur Fadden (1st)
Stanley Bruce	9 February 1923	22 October 1929				Joseph Lyons (1st)

- Earle Page under Robert Menzies Third Menzies ministry Fourth Menzies ministry Fifth Menzies ministry Sixth Menzies ministry and Arthur Fadden Fadden ministry
- Robert Menzies under Arthur Fadden Fadden ministry
- Arthur Fadden under Robert Menzies Second Menzies ministry Third Menzies ministry Fourth Menzies ministry Fifth Menzies ministry Sixth Menzies ministry Seventh Menzies ministry
- Frank Forde under Ben Chifley First Chifley ministry
- John McEwen under John Gorton First Gorton ministry Second Gorton ministry
- John Gorton under William McMahon McMahon ministry
- Kevin Rudd under Julia Gillard

== See also ==
- Records of prime ministers of the United Kingdom
