= Second Menzies ministry =

26th ministry of government of Australia

- 26th Ministry of Australia

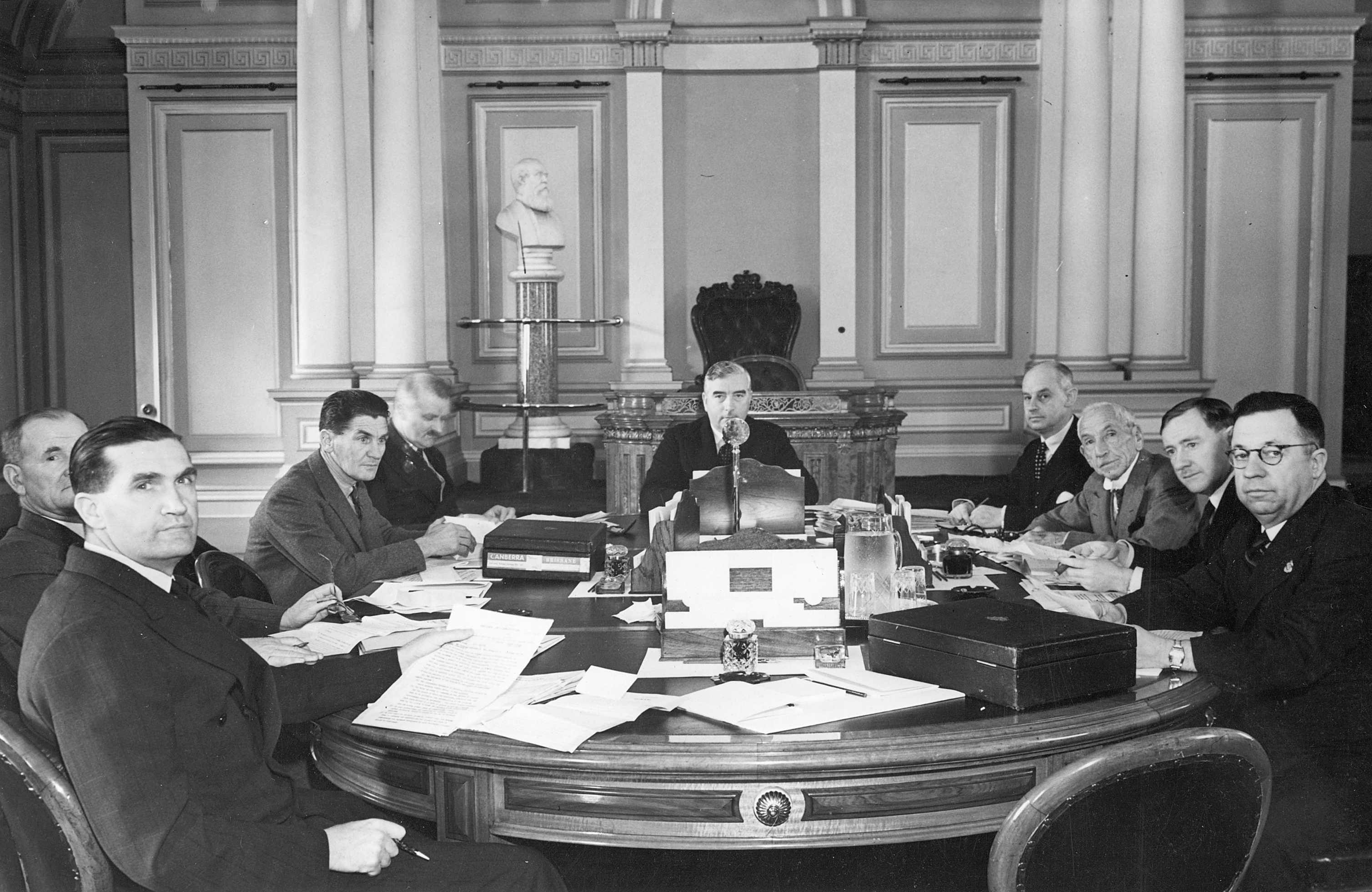
- Group photo of members of the Second Menzies ministry
- Date formed: 14 March 1940
- Date dissolved: 28 October 1940

People and organisations
- Monarch: George VI
- Governor-General: Lord Gowrie
- Prime Minister: Robert Menzies
- No. of ministers: 16
- Member party: United Australia–Country coalition
- Status in legislature: Majority government
- Opposition party: Labor
- Opposition leader: John Curtin

History
- Outgoing election: 21 September 1940
- Legislature term: 15th
- Predecessor: First Menzies ministry
- Successor: Third Menzies ministry

The Second Menzies ministry (United Australia–Country Coalition) was the 26th ministry of the Government of Australia. It was led by the country's 12th Prime Minister, Robert Menzies. The Second Menzies ministry succeeded the First Menzies ministry, which dissolved on 14 March 1940 after Menzies entered into a formal Coalition with Archie Cameron and his Country Party. The ministry was replaced by the Third Menzies ministry on 28 October 1940 following the 1940 federal election.

Percy Spender, who died in 1985, was the last surviving member of the Second Menzies ministry; Spender was also the last surviving minister of the First Menzies ministry, Third Menzies ministry, Fadden ministry, and the Fourth Menzies ministry. John McEwen was the last surviving Country minister.

== Ministry ==
Party	Minister	Portrait	Portfolio
United Australia	Robert Menzies (1894–1978) MP for Kooyong (1934–1966)		Prime Minister; Leader of the United Australia Party; Minister for Defence Co-ordination; Minister for Information; Minister for Munitions (from 11 June 1940)
Country	Archie Cameron (1895–1956) MP for Barker (1934–1956)		Leader of the Country Party (to 16 October 1940); Minister for Commerce; Minister for the Navy
United Australia	Billy Hughes (1862–1952) MP for North Sydney (1922–1949)		Attorney-General; Minister for Industry
United Australia	Percy Spender (1897–1985) MP for Warringah (1937–1951)		Treasurer
Country	John McEwen (1900–1980) MP for Indi (1937–1949)		Minister for External Affairs
Country	Harold Thorby (1888–1973) MP for Calare (1931–1940)		Deputy Leader of the Country Party (to 15 October 1940); Minister for Health; Postmaster-General
United Australia	Geoffrey Street (1894–1940) MP for Corangamite (1934–1940)		Minister for the Army (to 13 August 1940); Minister for Repatriation (to 13 August 1940)
United Australia	Sir Henry Gullett (1878–1940) MP for Henty (1925–1940)		Vice-President of the Executive Council (to 13 August 1940); Minister in charge of Scientific and Industrial Research (to 13 August 1940); Minister assisting the Minister for Information (to 13 August 1940)
United Australia	George McLeay (1892–1955) Senator for South Australia (1935–1947)		Minister for Trade and Customs; Leader of the Government in the Senate
United Australia	James Fairbairn (1897–1940) MP for Flinders (1933–1940)		Minister for Civil Aviation (to 13 August 1940); Minister for Air (to 13 August 1940)
United Australia	Sir Frederick Stewart (1884–1961) MP for Parramatta (1931–1946)		Minister for Social Services; Minister for Supply and Development
United Australia	Harry Foll (1890–1977) Senator for Queensland (1917–1947)		Minister for the Interior
United Australia	Herbert Collett (1877–1947) Senator for Western Australia (1933–1947)		Minister without portfolio administering War Service Homes (to 14 August 1940); Minister without portfolio assisting the Minister for Repatriation (to 14 August 1940); Minister in charge of War Service Homes (from 14 August 1940); Vice-President of the Executive Council (from 14 August 1940); Minister in charge of Scientific and Industrial Research (from 14 August 1940); Minister assisting the Minister for Repatriation (from 14 August 1940)
United Australia	Philip McBride (1892–1982) Senator for South Australia (1937–1944)		Minister without portfolio assisting the Minister for Commerce (to 14 August 1940); Minister for the Army (from 14 August 1940); Minister for Repatriation (from 14 August 1940); Minister assisting the Minister for Commerce (from 14 August 1940)
Country	Arthur Fadden (1894–1973) MP for Darling Downs (1936–1949)		Deputy Leader of the Country Party (from 16 October 1940); Minister without portfolio assisting the Minister for Supply and Development (to 14 August 1940); Minister without portfolio assisting the Treasurer (to 14 August 1940); Minister for Air (from 14 August 1940); Minister for Civil Aviation (from 14 August 1940); Minister assisting the Treasurer (from 14 August 1940); Minister assisting the Minister for Supply and Development (from 14 August 1940)
Country	Horace Nock (1879–1958) MP for Riverina (1931–1940)		Minister without portfolio assisting the Prime Minister; Minister without portfolio in charge of External Territories; Minister without portfolio assisting the Minister for the Interior
