= Third Menzies ministry =

27th ministry of the government of Australia

- 27th Ministry of Australia

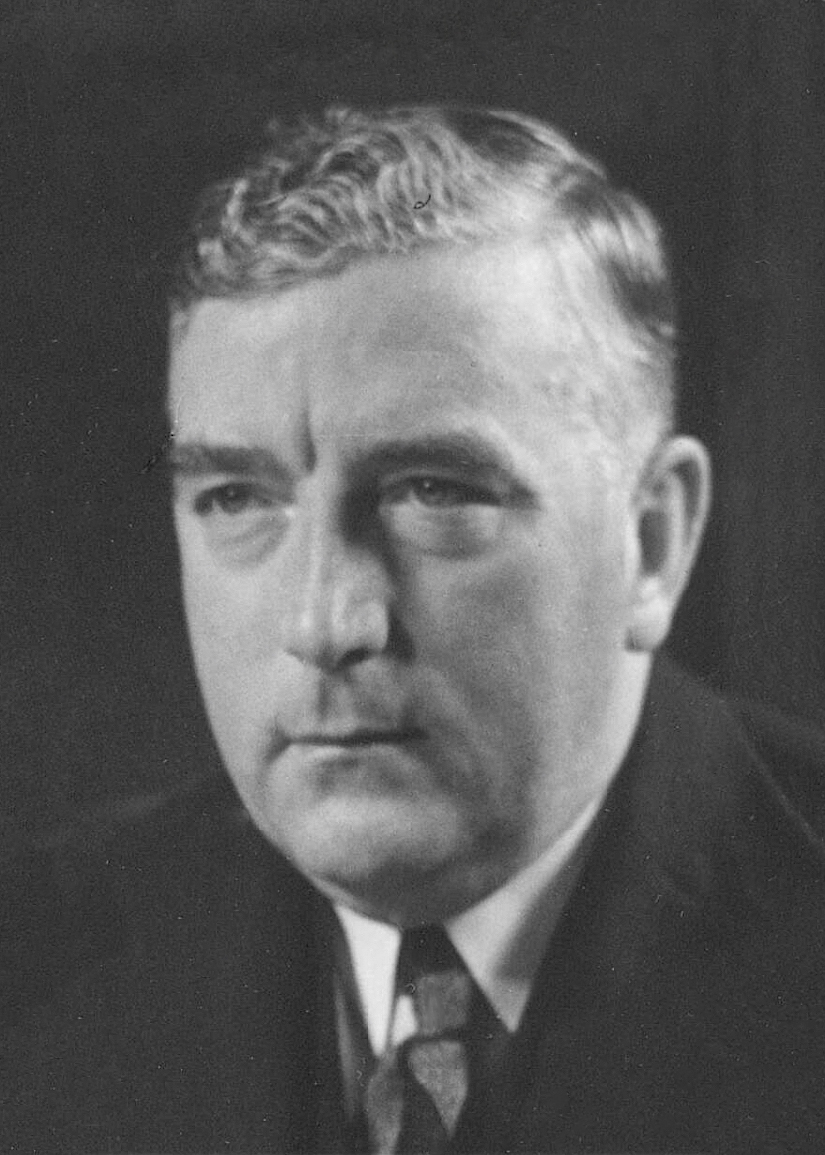
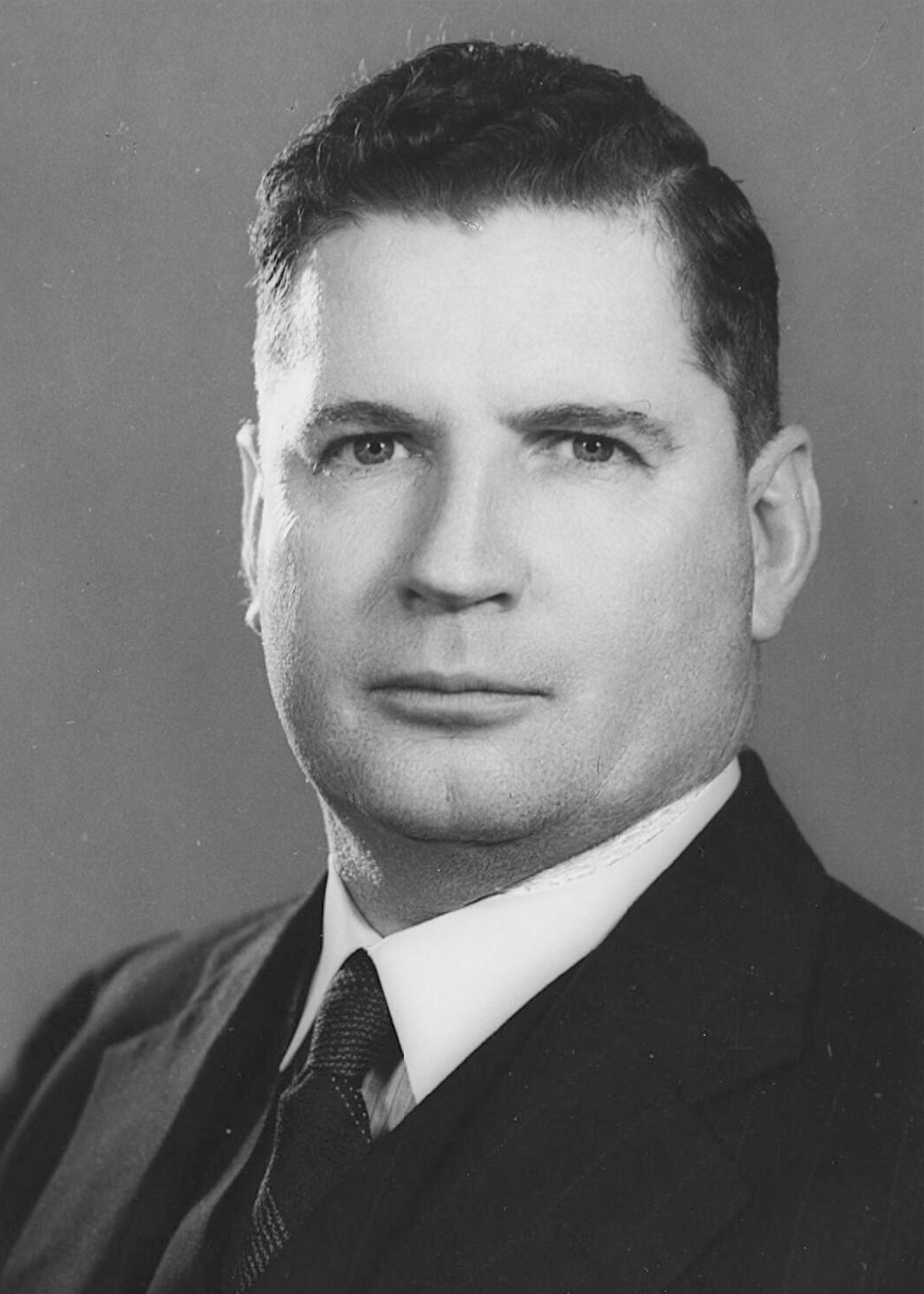
- Robert Menzies Arthur Fadden
- Date formed: 28 October 1940
- Date dissolved: 28 August 1941

People and organisations
- Monarch: George VI
- Governor-General: Lord Gowrie
- Prime Minister: Robert Menzies
- No. of ministers: 19
- Member party: United Australia–Country coalition
- Status in legislature: Minority government
- Opposition party: Labor
- Opposition leader: John Curtin

History
- Election: 21 September 1940
- Legislature term: 16th
- Predecessor: Second Menzies ministry
- Successor: Fadden ministry

The Third Menzies ministry (United Australia–Country Coalition) was the 27th ministry of the Government of Australia. It was led by the country's 12th Prime Minister, Robert Menzies. The Third Menzies ministry succeeded the Second Menzies ministry, which dissolved on 28 October 1940 following the federal election that took place in September. However, as a result of that election the government was reduced to minority status, and were forced to rely on the votes of independent crossbenchers Alexander Wilson and Arthur Coles to survive. The ministry was replaced by the Fadden ministry on 28 August 1941 following the resignation of Menzies.

Percy Spender, who died in 1985, was the last surviving member of the Third Menzies ministry; Spender was also the last surviving minister of the First Menzies ministry, Second Menzies ministry, Fadden ministry, and the Fourth Menzies ministry. John McEwen was the last surviving Country minister.

== Ministry ==
Party	Minister	Portrait	Portfolio
United Australia	Robert Menzies (1894–1978) MP for Kooyong (1934–1966)		Prime Minister; Leader of the United Australia Party; Minister for Defence Co-ordination; Minister for Information (to 13 December 1940)
Country	Arthur Fadden (1894–1973) MP for Darling Downs (1936–1949)		Leader of the Country Party (from 12 March 1941); Deputy Leader of the Country Party (to 12 March 1941); Treasurer
United Australia	Billy Hughes (1862–1952) MP for North Sydney (1922–1949)		Attorney-General; Minister for the Navy
United Australia	George McLeay (1892–1955) Senator for South Australia (1935–1947)		Vice-President of the Executive Council; Leader of the Government in the Senate; Postmaster-General (to 26 June 1941); Minister for Repatriation (to 26 June 1941); Minister for Supply and Development (from 26 June 1941)
United Australia	Sir Frederick Stewart (1884–1961) MP for Parramatta (1931–1946)		Minister for External Affairs; Minister for Health; Minister for Social Services
United Australia	Harry Foll (1890–1977) Senator for Queensland (1917–1947)		Minister for the Interior; Minister for Information (from 13 December 1940)
United Australia	Herbert Collett (1877–1947) Senator for Western Australia (1933–1947)		Minister without portfolio administering War Service Homes (to 26 June 1941); Minister without portfolio assisting the Minister for Repatriation (to 26 June 1941); Minister for Repatriation (from 26 June 1941)
United Australia	Philip McBride (1892–1982) Senator for South Australia (1937–1944)		Minister for Munitions; Minister for Supply and Development (to 26 June 1941)
United Australia	Percy Spender (1897–1985) MP for Warringah (1937–1951)		Minister for the Army
Country	John McEwen (1900–1980) MP for Indi (1937–1949)		Minister for Air; Minister for Civil Aviation
United Australia	Eric Harrison (1892–1974) MP for Wentworth (1931–1956)		Minister for Trade and Customs
United Australia	Harold Holt (1908–1967) MP for Fawkner (1935–1949)		Minister for Labour and National Service; Minister in charge of Scientific and Industrial Research
Country	Sir Earle Page (1880–1961) MP for Cowper (1919–1961)		Minister for Commerce
Country	Thomas Collins (1884–1945) MP for Hume (1931–1943)		Minister without portfolio assisting the Prime Minister dealing with External Territories (to 26 June 1941); Minister without portfolio assisting the Minister for the Interior (to 26 June 1941); Postmaster-General (from 26 June 1941); Minister assisting the Minister for Supply and Development (from 26 June 1941)
United Australia	John Leckie (1872–1947) Senator for Victoria (1935–1947)		Minister without portfolio assisting the Minister for Trade and Customs (to 26 June 1941); Minister without portfolio assisting the Minister for Labour and National Service (to 26 June 1941); Minister for Aircraft Production (from 26 June 1941); Minister assisting the Minister for Munitions (from 26 June 1941)
Country	Larry Anthony (1897–1957) MP for Richmond (1937–1957)		Minister without portfolio assisting the Treasurer (to 26 June 1941); Minister without portfolio assisting the Minister for Commerce (to 26 June 1941); Minister for Transport (from 26 June 1941); Minister assisting the Treasurer (from 26 June 1941); Minister assisting the Minister for Commerce (from 26 June 1941)
Country	Joe Abbott (1891–1965) MP for New England (1940–1949) (in Ministry from 26 June 1941)		Minister for Home Security (from 26 June 1941); Minister assisting the Minister for Defence Co-ordination (from 26 June 1941); Minister assisting the Minister for the Army (from 26 June 1941)
United Australia	Allan McDonald (1888–1953) MP for Corangamite (1940–1953) (in Ministry from 26 June 1941)		Minister for External Territories (from 26 June 1941); Minister assisting the Minister for the Interior (from 26 June 1941)
United Australia	Eric Spooner (1891–1952) MP for Robertson (1940–1943) (in Ministry from 26 June 1941)		Minister for War Organisation of Industry (from 26 June 1941)
