= Fadden ministry =

28th ministry of government of Australia

- 28th Ministry of Australia

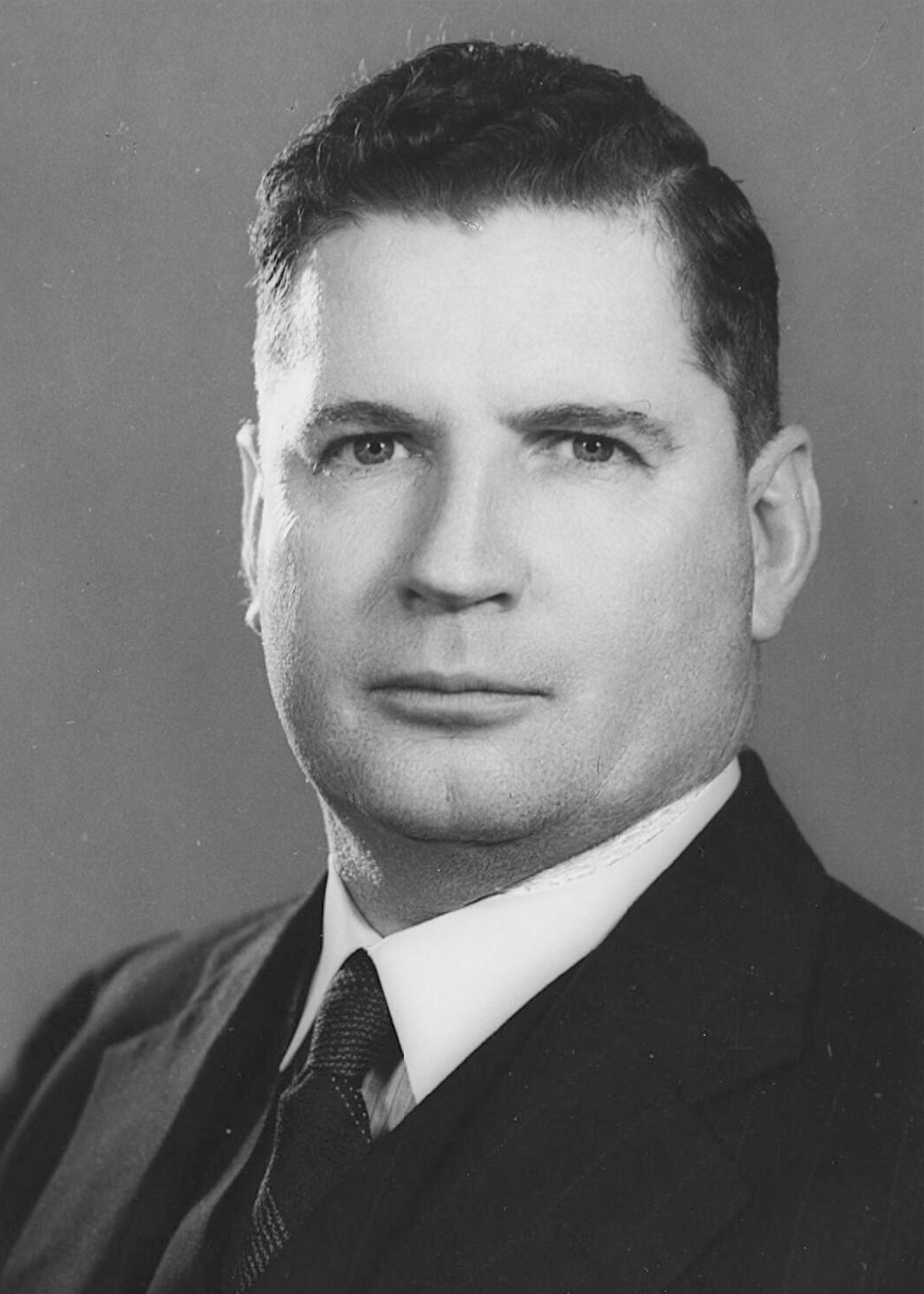
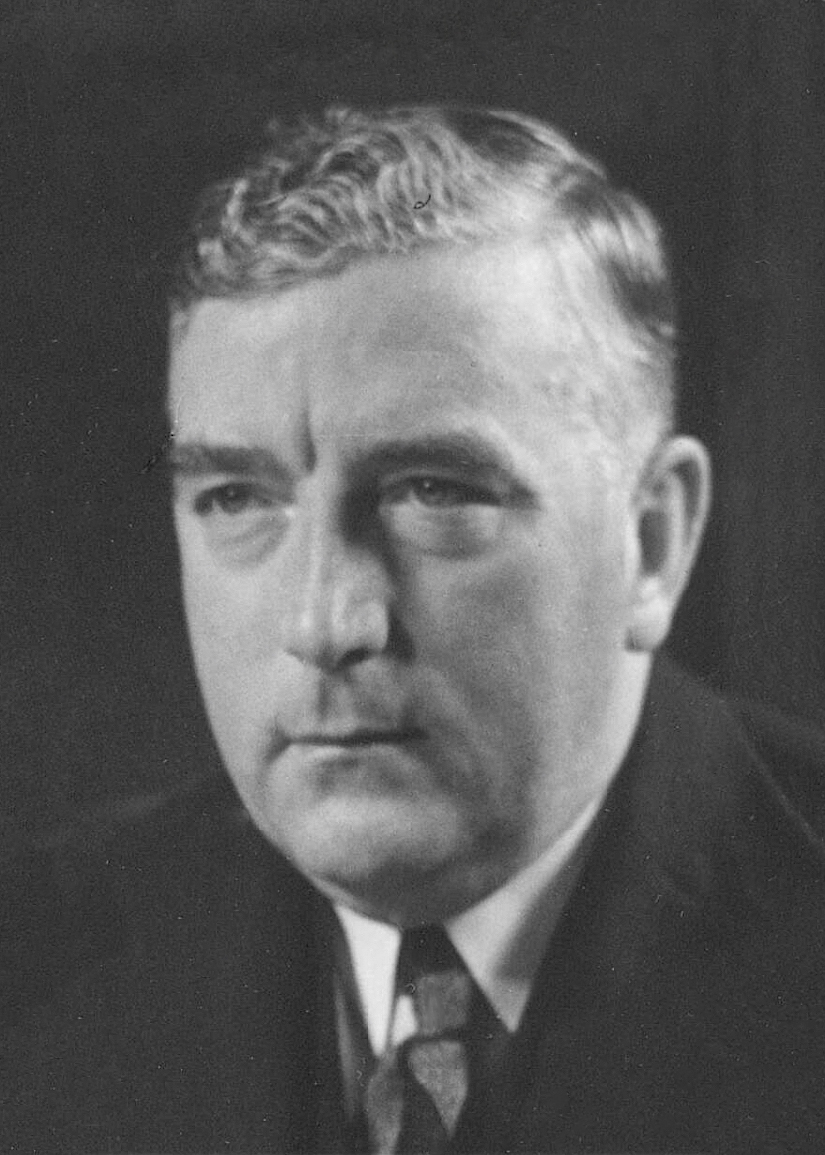
- Arthur Fadden Robert Menzies
- Date formed: 28 August 1941
- Date dissolved: 7 October 1941

People and organisations
- Monarch: George VI
- Governor-General: Lord Gowrie
- Prime Minister: Arthur Fadden
- No. of ministers: 19
- Member party: Country–United Australia coalition
- Status in legislature: Minority government
- Opposition party: Labor
- Opposition leader: John Curtin

History
- Legislature term: 16th
- Predecessor: Third Menzies ministry
- Successor: First Curtin ministry

The Fadden ministry (Country–United Australia Coalition) was the 28th ministry of the Government of Australia. It was led by the country's 13th Prime Minister, Arthur Fadden. The Fadden ministry succeeded the Third Menzies ministry, which dissolved on 28 August 1941 following the resignation of Robert Menzies as Prime Minister. A subsequent joint meeting of the Coalition parties elected Country leader Fadden as Menzies' successor. The ministry was replaced by the First Curtin ministry on 7 October 1941 after the independent crossbenchers Alexander Wilson and Arthur Coles withdrew their support for the Fadden government and voted with John Curtin and his Labor Party to bring the government down in a de facto no-confidence motion.

Percy Spender, who died in 1985, was the last surviving member of the Fadden ministry; Spender was also the last surviving minister of the first Menzies government and the Fourth Menzies ministry. John McEwen was the last surviving Country minister.

== Ministry ==
Party	Minister	Portrait	Portfolio
Country	Arthur Fadden (1894–1973) MP for Darling Downs (1936–1949)		Prime Minister; Leader of the Country Party; Treasurer
United Australia	Robert Menzies (1894–1978) MP for Kooyong (1934–1966)		Leader of the United Australia Party; Minister for Defence Co-ordination
United Australia	Billy Hughes (1862–1952) MP for North Sydney (1922–1949)		Attorney-General; Minister for the Navy
United Australia	Percy Spender (1897–1985) MP for Warringah (1937–1951)		Minister for the Army
United Australia	George McLeay (1892–1955) Senator for South Australia (1935–1947)		Vice-President of the Executive Council; Minister for Supply and Development; Leader of the Government in the Senate
Country	John McEwen (1900–1980) MP for Indi (1937–1949)		Minister for Air; Minister for Civil Aviation
United Australia	Harry Foll (1890–1977) Senator for Queensland (1917–1947)		Minister for the Interior; Minister for Information
Country	Sir Earle Page (1880–1961) MP for Cowper (1919–1961)		Minister for Commerce
United Australia	Sir Frederick Stewart (1884–1961) MP for Parramatta (1931–1946)		Minister for External Affairs; Minister for Health; Minister for Social Services
United Australia	Philip McBride (1892–1982) Senator for South Australia (1937–1944)		Minister for Munitions
United Australia	Eric Harrison (1892–1974) MP for Wentworth (1931–1956)		Minister for Trade and Customs
United Australia	Harold Holt (1908–1967) MP for Fawkner (1935–1949)		Minister for Labour and National Service
United Australia	Herbert Collett (1877–1947) Senator for Western Australia (1933–1947)		Minister for Repatriation
Country	Thomas Collins (1884–1945) MP for Hume (1931–1943)		Postmaster-General
United Australia	John Leckie (1872–1947) Senator for Victoria (1935–1947)		Minister for Aircraft Production
Country	Larry Anthony (1897–1957) MP for Richmond (1937–1957)		Minister for Transport
United Australia	Eric Spooner (1891–1952) MP for Robertson (1940–1943)		Minister for War Organisation of Industry
Country	Joe Abbott} (1891–1965) MP for New England (1940–1949)		Minister for Home Security
United Australia	Allan McDonald (1888–1953) MP for Corangamite (1940–1953)		Minister for External Territories
