= Menzies government =

Menzies government may refer to:

- Menzies government (1939–1941)
- Menzies government (1949–1966)
