= First Menzies ministry =

25th ministry of the government of Australia

- 25th Ministry of Australia

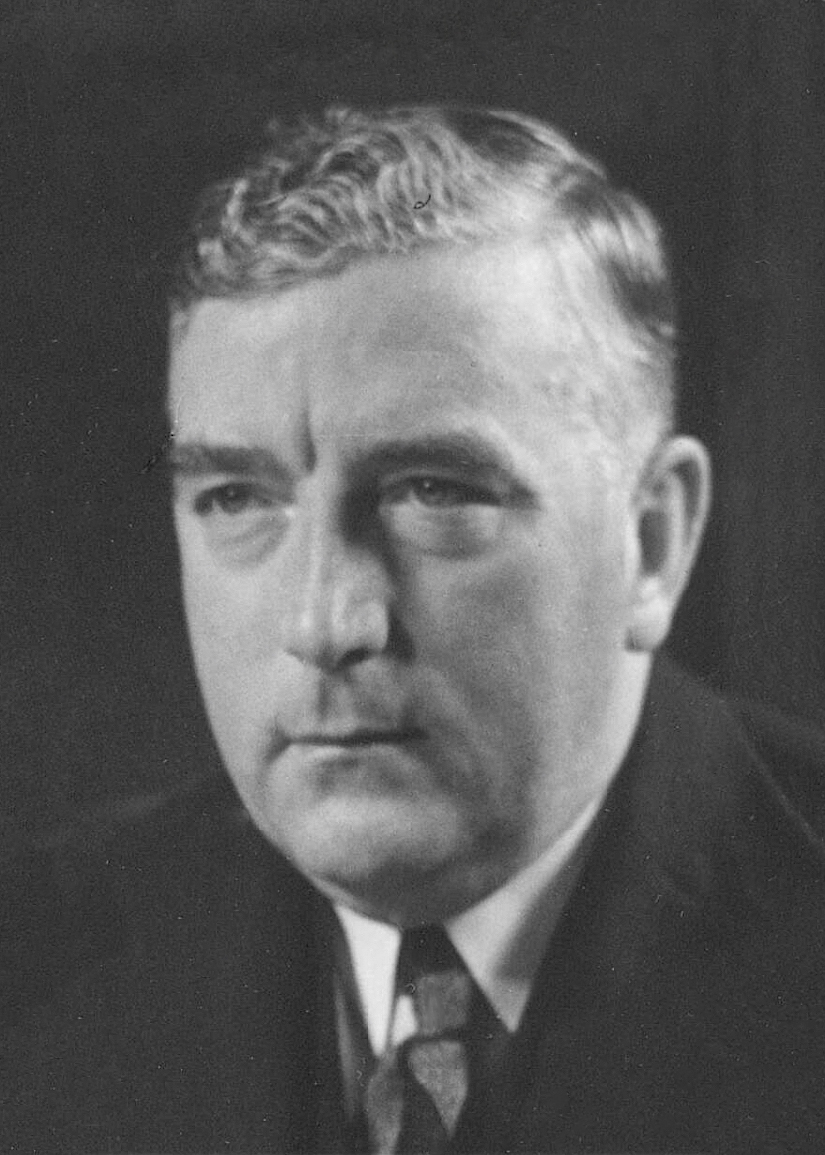
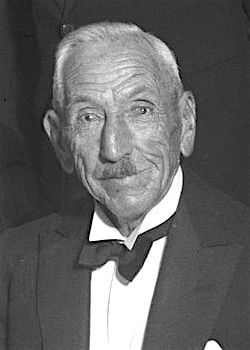
- Robert Menzies Billy Hughes
- Date formed: 26 April 1939
- Date dissolved: 14 March 1940

People and organisations
- Monarch: George VI
- Governor-General: Lord Gowrie
- Prime Minister: Robert Menzies
- No. of ministers: 16
- Member party: United Australia
- Status in legislature: Minority government
- Opposition party: Labor
- Opposition leader: John Curtin

History
- Legislature term: 15th
- Predecessor: Page ministry
- Successor: Second Menzies ministry

The First Menzies ministry (United Australia) was the 25th ministry of the Government of Australia. It was led by the country's 12th Prime Minister, Robert Menzies. The First Menzies ministry succeeded the Page ministry, which dissolved on 26 April 1939 following the election of Menzies as UAP leader after the death of former Prime Minister Joseph Lyons. However, due to the Country Party withdrawing from the Coalition after relations between caretaker Prime Minister Sir Earle Page and Menzies broke down, the First Menzies ministry was composed solely of UAP ministers, and was effectively a minority government. The ministry was replaced by the Second Menzies ministry on 14 March 1940 after Menzies took the Country Party back into his government - now led by Archie Cameron.

Percy Spender, who died in 1985, was the last surviving member of the First Menzies ministry; Spender was also the last surviving minister of the Second Menzies ministry, Third Menzies ministry, Fadden ministry, and the Fourth Menzies ministry.

== Ministry ==
Party	Minister	Portrait	Portfolio
United Australia	Robert Menzies (1894–1978) MP for Kooyong (1934–1966)		Prime Minister; Leader of the United Australia Party; Treasurer; Minister for Defence Co-ordination (from 13 November 1939); Minister for Trade and Customs (from 23 February 1940)
United Australia	Billy Hughes (1862–1952) MP for North Sydney (1922–1949)		Attorney-General; Minister for Industry
United Australia	Geoffrey Street (1894–1940) MP for Corangamite (1934–1940)		Minister for Defence (to 13 November 1939); Minister for the Army (from 13 November 1939)
United Australia	Richard Casey (1890–1976) MP for Corio (1931–1940)		Minister for Supply and Development (to 26 January 1940)
United Australia	Sir Henry Gullett (1878–1940) MP for Henty (1925–1940)		Minister for External Affairs; Minister for Information (from 12 September 1939)
United Australia	George McLeay (1892–1955) Senator for South Australia (1935–1947)		Minister for Commerce; Leader of the Government in the Senate
United Australia	John Lawson (1897–1956) MP for Macquarie (1931–1940)		Minister for Trade and Customs (to 23 February 1940)
United Australia	Eric Harrison (1892–1974) MP for Wentworth (1931–1956)		Postmaster-General; Minister for Repatriation
United Australia	James Fairbairn (1897–1940) MP for Flinders (1933–1940)		Minister for Civil Aviation; Vice-President of the Executive Council (to 26 January 1940); Minister for Air (from 13 November 1939)
United Australia	Sir Frederick Stewart (1884–1961) MP for Parramatta (1931–1946)		Minister for Health; Minister for Social Services; Minister for the Navy (from 13 November 1939); Minister for Supply and Development (from 26 January 1940)
United Australia	Harry Foll (1890–1977) Senator for Queensland (1917–1947)		Minister for the Interior
United Australia	Percy Spender (1897–1985) MP for Warringah (1937–1951)		Minister without portfolio assisting the Treasurer (to 3 November 1939); Vice-President of the Executive Council (from 26 January 1940)
United Australia	John Perkins (1878–1954) MP for Eden-Monaro (1931–1943)		Minister without portfolio administering external territories
United Australia	Herbert Collett (1877–1947) Senator for Western Australia (1933–1947)		Minister without portfolio administering War Service Homes
United Australia	Harold Holt (1908–1967) MP for Fawkner (1935–1949)		Minister without portfolio assisting the Minister for Supply and Development; Minister without portfolio assisting the Minister for Trade and Customs (from 23 February 1940)
United Australia	Philip McBride (1892–1982) Senator for South Australia (1937–1944)		Minister without portfolio assisting the Minister for Commerce
