= Eric Harrison =

Australian politician and diplomat (1892–1974)

The Right Honourable Sir Eric Harrison KCMG, KCVO
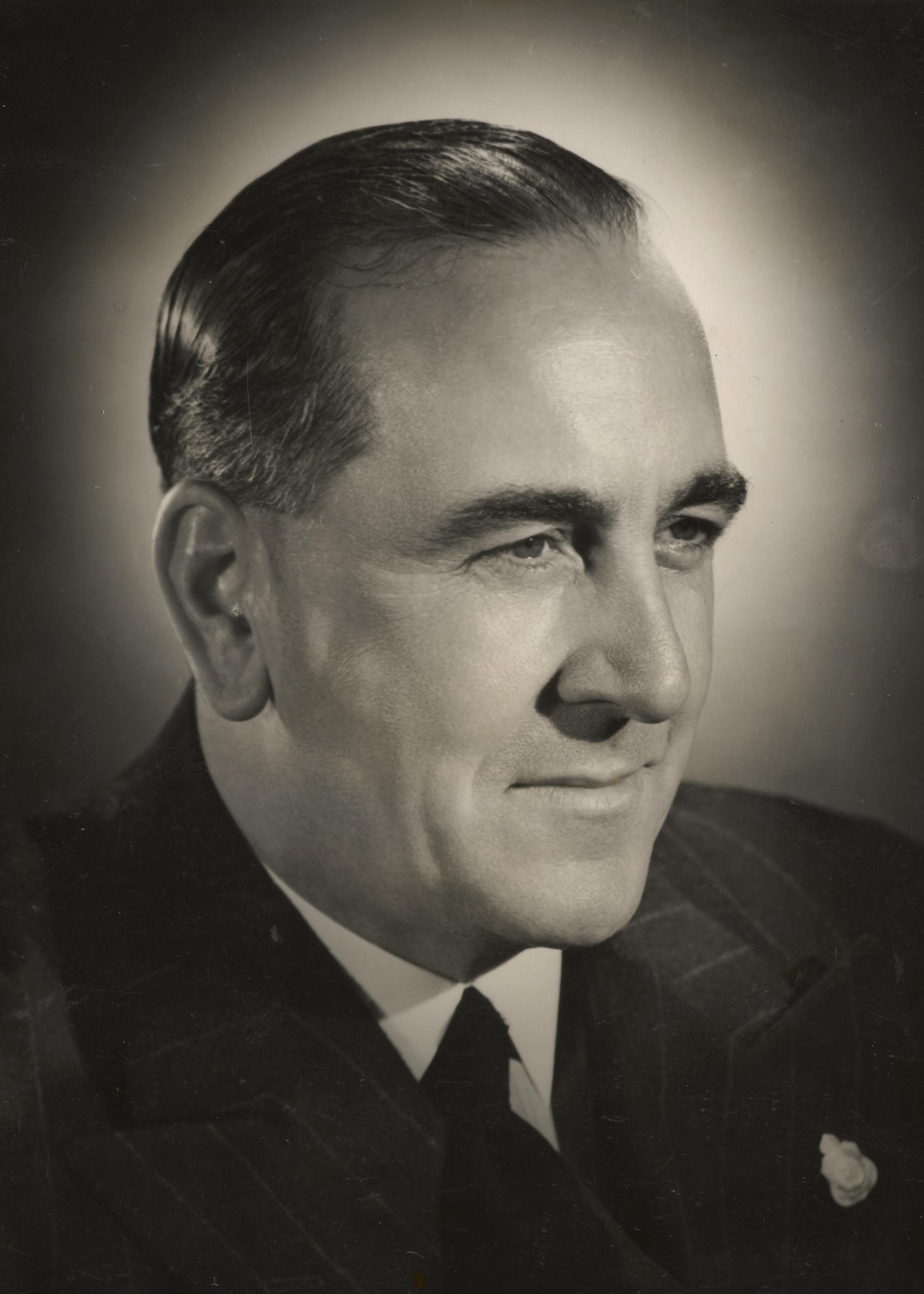

Deputy Leader of the Liberal Party (UAP 1944–45)
- In office 14 April 1944 – 26 September 1956
- Leader: Robert Menzies
- Preceded by: Billy Hughes
- Succeeded by: Harold Holt

Leader of the House
- In office 11 May 1951 – 26 September 1956
- Preceded by: Office established
- Succeeded by: Harold Holt
Cabinet Posts
Vice-President of the Executive Council
In office 11 May 1951 – 24 October 1956
Prime Minister	Robert Menzies
Preceded by	Josiah Francis
Succeeded by	Neil O'Sullivan
Minister for the Army
In office 7 November 1955 – 28 February 1956
Prime Minister	Robert Menzies
Preceded by	Josiah Francis
Succeeded by	John Cramer
Minister for the Navy
In office 11 July 1955 – 11 January 1956
Prime Minister	Robert Menzies
Preceded by	Josiah Francis
Succeeded by	Neil O'Sullivan
Minister for Defence Production
In office 11 May 1951 – 24 October 1956
Prime Minister	Robert Menzies
Minister for Defence
In office 19 December 1949 – 24 October 1950
Prime Minister	Robert Menzies
Preceded by	John Dedman
Succeeded by	Philip McBride
Minister for Postwar Reconstruction
In office 19 December 1949 – 17 March 1950
Prime Minister	Robert Menzies
Preceded by	John Dedman
Succeeded by	Richard Casey
Minister for Trade and Customs
In office 28 October 1940 – 7 October 1941
Prime Minister	Robert Menzies; Arthur Fadden
Preceded by	George McLeay
Succeeded by	Richard Keane
Minister for Repatriation
In office 26 April 1939 – 14 March 1940
Prime Minister	Robert Menzies
Preceded by	Harry Foll
Succeeded by	Geoffrey Street
Postmaster-General
In office 26 April 1939 – 14 March 1940
Prime Minister	Robert Menzies
Preceded by	Archie Cameron
Succeeded by	Harold Thorby
Minister Assisting the Prime Minister Minister for External Territories
In office 8 November 1938 – 26 April 1939
Prime Minister	Joseph Lyons; Earle Page
Preceded by	John Perkins
Succeeded by	John Perkins
Minister for the Interior
In office 12 October 1934 – 9 November 1934
Prime Minister	Joseph Lyons
Preceded by	John Perkins
Succeeded by	Thomas Paterson

High Commissioner to the United Kingdom
- In office 25 October 1956 – 25 October 1964
- Preceded by: Thomas White
- Succeeded by: Alick Downer
- In office 23 April 1950 – 30 March 1951
- Preceded by: Jack Beasley
- Succeeded by: Thomas White

Member of the Australian Parliament for Wentworth
- In office 19 December 1931 – 17 October 1956
- Preceded by: Walter Marks
- Succeeded by: Les Bury

Personal details
- Born: 7 September 1892 Surry Hills, New South Wales, Australia
- Died: 26 September 1974 (aged 82) Chatswood, New South Wales, Australia
- Party: UAP (1931–45); Liberal (from 1945)
- Spouses: Mary McCall (m. 1920–1941) Linda Yardley (m. 1944)
- Children: 3, including Shirley Walters

Sir Eric John Harrison, KCMG, KCVO (7 September 1892 – 26 September 1974) was an Australian politician and diplomat. He was the inaugural deputy leader of the Liberal Party (1945–1956), and a government minister under four prime ministers. He was later High Commissioner to the United Kingdom from 1956 to 1964.

Harrison was born in Sydney and left school at the age of 13. He served with the Australian Army during World War I, and after the war's end became the manager of a textile factory. Harrison was elected to the House of Representatives in 1931, representing the United Australia Party (UAP). He served briefly as Minister for Interior in 1934, under Joseph Lyons, and returned to the ministry in 1938. Over the next three years he held positions in the governments of Lyons, Earle Page, Robert Menzies, and Arthur Fadden.

In 1944, Harrison replaced Billy Hughes as deputy leader of the UAP. When the new Liberal Party was formed the following year, he was elected to the same position. In Menzies' second government, Harrison held various defence-related portfolios. He was also made the inaugural Leader of the House in 1951. Harrison left politics in 1956 to become High Commissioner to the United Kingdom. He retired in 1964, and suffered from Parkinson's disease in later years. His daughter, Shirley Walters, followed him into politics, becoming the first woman to represent Tasmania in the Senate.

== Early life ==
Harrison was born in Surry Hills, Sydney, New South Wales, to Elizabeth Jane (née Anderson) and Arthur Hoffman Harrison. His mother was born in Ireland, while his father – who worked as a painter and decorator – was born in England. Harrison attended the Crown Street Superior Public School until the age of thirteen, when he left school to work in the textile industry. He eventually became the manager of one of the factories owned by James Anderson Murdoch. In October 1916, Harrison joined the Australian Imperial Force and served on the Western Front from December 1917 in the 5th Field Artillery Brigade. He was promoted to sergeant in May 1918, and rowed in the Royal Henley Peace Regatta in 1919. After returning to Australia and taking his discharge, Harrison married Mary Cook McCall in 1920.

== Political career ==
=== 1930s ===
Although Harrison had not previously been politically active, in 1931 he established a branch of Joseph Lyons' All for Australia League in the Sydney suburb of Auburn, within Jack Lang's electorate, with police protection. In the December 1931 general elections he defeated Walter Marks for the House of Representatives seat of Wentworth, although both had been endorsed by the United Australia Party (UAP). He was appointed Minister for the Interior from 12 October 1934 in the Second Lyons ministry, but lost the position on 9 November 1934 in Lyons' third Ministry, created to accommodate the Country Party. During this period he banned the entry of the Czechoslovak anti-fascist campaigner, Egon Erwin Kisch into Australia.

In November 1938, Harrison became Minister without portfolio administering External Territories, and in April 1939 was appointed Postmaster-General and Minister for Repatriation in Robert Menzies' first ministry, when the Country Party left the coalition.

=== World War II ===
When the Country Party returned to the Coalition in March 1940, Harrison was again left out of the ministry. He became Minister for Trade and Customs in Menzies third ministry in October 1940. He is notable for making available a newsprint ration for Ezra Norton's Daily Mirror in 1941, while tightening overall newsprint rationing.

Harrison was a strong supporter of Menzies, as he continued to be after World War II. He went into opposition with the defeat of the Fadden government in October 1941 and almost lost his seat to suffragette and Australian Labor Party candidate Jessie Street in December 1943.

Harrison was commissioned as an officer in the Militia in 1940 and in 1942 and 1943 he was a full-time liaison officer with the United States military forces in Australia. On one occasion he wore a uniform in Canberra, causing Eddie Ward to denounce him as a fake soldier and to accuse him of having been a member of the New Guard.

His wife died in 1941 and in October 1944 he married Linda Ruth Yardley, née Fullerton, a widow and a businesswoman.

He became deputy leader of the UAP in April 1944. When the UAP was folded into the Liberal Party of Australia in late 1944, Harrison became its first deputy leader, holding the position until 1956. He was the longest serving Liberal Party Deputy Leader until his record was broken by Peter Costello in 2006.

He was a vocal critic of the Curtin and Chifley governments.

=== Post-war ===
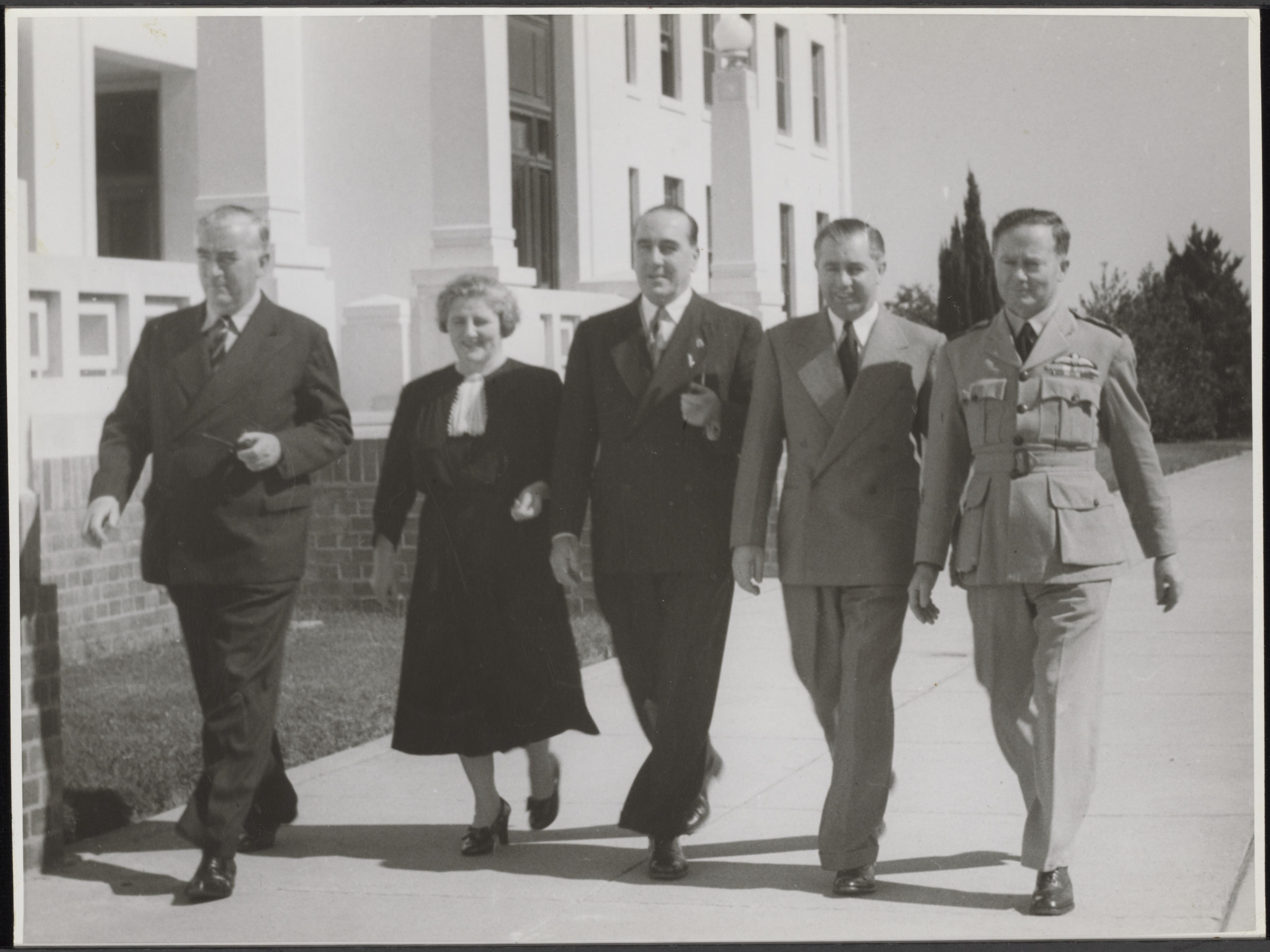
Sir Robert Menzies, Dame Enid Lyons, Sir Eric Harrison, Harold Holt and Sir Thomas White in 1946.

Following the Liberal Party's win in the December 1949 election, Harrison became the third-ranking member of the government, behind Menzies and Country Party leader Arthur Fadden.

He served as Minister for Postwar Reconstruction (until March 1950) and Minister for Defence in the Menzies ministry. From April 1950 until March 1951 he was resident in London, and in October 1950 he moved from the Defence portfolio to become Minister for the Interior. In May 1951, he became Minister for Defence Production and Vice-President of the Executive Council in Menzies' fifth ministry and the inaugural Leader of the House. From November 1955 to February 1956, he was also Minister for the Army and Minister for the Navy.

Harrison was acting prime minister for two weeks in June 1954, when Menzies was in New Zealand and Fadden was recovering from injuries sustained in a car accident.

== Later life ==
Harrison resigned from parliament in 1956 and became Australian High Commissioner in London, where he was an outspoken advocate of the "Old Commonwealth".

The Harrisons returned to Australia in September 1964 and moved to the Sydney suburb of Castle Cove. He died at Chatswood of Parkinson's disease and was survived by his wife and the three daughters of his first marriage. One of his daughters was Shirley Walters, a Senator for Tasmania 1975–93.

== Honours ==
Harrison was made a Knight Commander of the Royal Victorian Order (KCVO) in 1954 as a result of being minister in charge of the royal visit of Queen Elizabeth II. This was an honour within the Queen's personal gift. He was appointed a Knight Commander of the Order of St Michael and St George (KCMG) in the Queen's New Years Honours for 1962 for his service as High Commissioner to the UK.

== Notes ==
Parliament of Australia
Preceded by Walter Marks	Member for Wentworth; 1931–1956	Succeeded by Les Bury
Political offices
Preceded by John Perkins	Minister for the Interior; 1934	Succeeded by Thomas Paterson
Preceded by John Perkins	Minister without portfolio administering External Territories; 1938–1939	Succeeded by John Perkins
Preceded by Archie Cameron	Postmaster-General; 1939–1940	Succeeded by Harold Thorby
Preceded by Harry Foll	Minister for Repatriation; 1939–1940	Succeeded by Geoffrey Street
Preceded by George McLeay	Minister for Trade and Customs; 1940–1941	Succeeded by Richard Keane
Preceded by John Dedman	Minister for Defence; 1949–1950	Succeeded by Philip McBride
Preceded by John Dedman	Minister for Postwar Reconstruction; 1949–1950	Succeeded by Richard Casey (National Development)
Preceded by Philip McBride	Minister for the Interior; 1950–1951	Succeeded by Wilfrid Kent Hughes
New title	Minister for Defence Production; 1951–1956	Succeeded by Howard Beale
Preceded by Robert Menzies	Vice-President of the Executive Council; 1951–1956	Succeeded by Neil O'Sullivan
Preceded by Josiah Francis	Minister for the Army; 1955–1956	Succeeded by John Cramer
Preceded by Josiah Francis	Minister for the Navy; 1955–1956	Succeeded by Neil O'Sullivan
Party political offices
Preceded by Billy Hughes	Deputy Leader of the UAP; 1944–1945	Party dissolved
New office	Deputy Leader of the Liberal Party; 1945–1956	Succeeded by Harold Holt
Diplomatic posts
Preceded by Norman Mighell (Acting)	Australian High Commissioner to the United Kingdom; 1956–1964	Succeeded by Alec Downer
