= Menzies government (1939–1941) =

Menzies government (I)

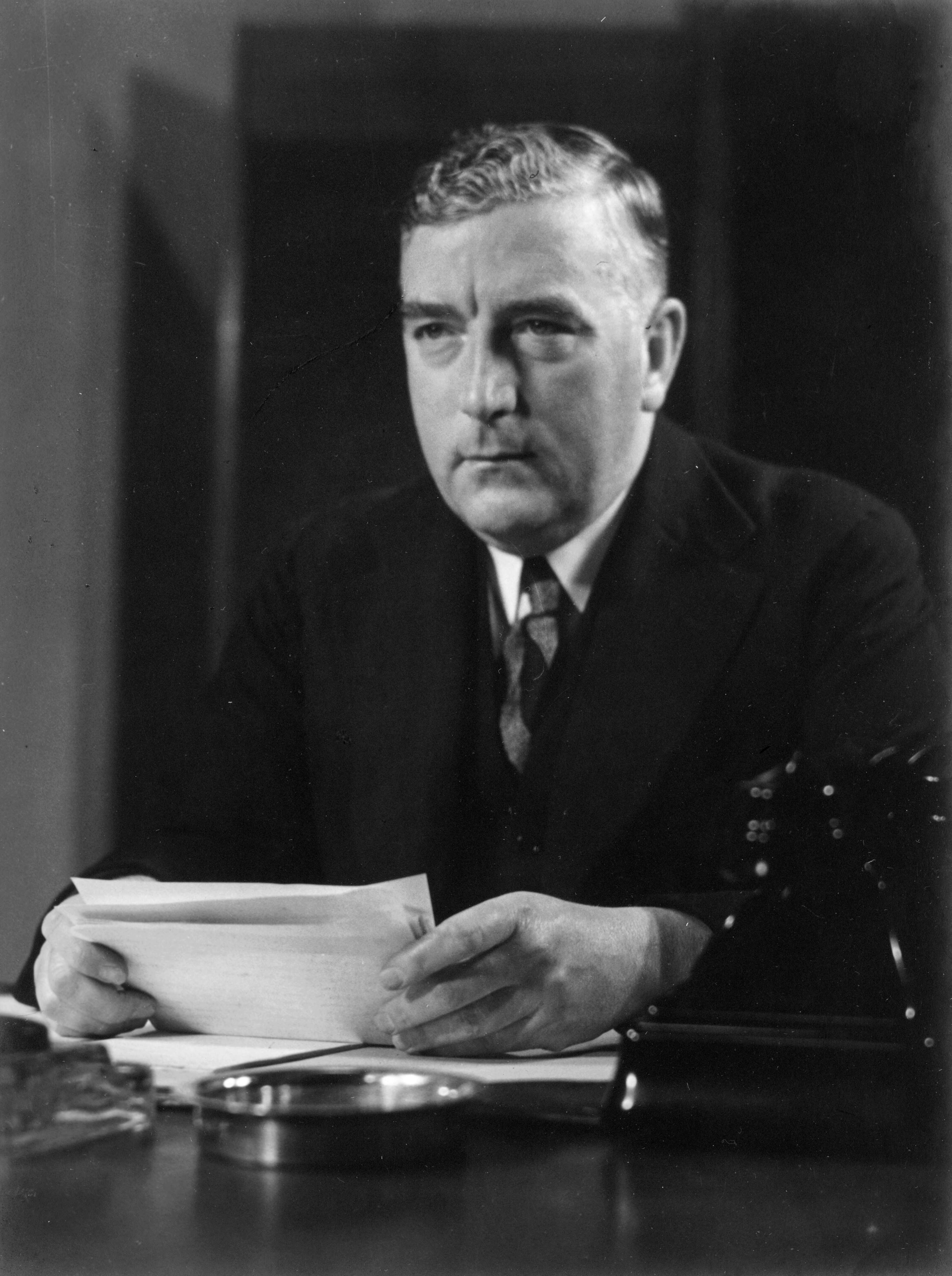

In office
- 26 April 1939 – 26 August 1941
- Monarch: George VI
- Prime Minister: Robert Menzies
- Deputy: Archie Cameron (1940); Arthur Fadden (1940–1941)
- Parties: UAP (1939–1941); Country (1940–1941)
- Status: Minority (to Mar. 1940); Majority (Mar.–Sep. 1940); Minority (from Sep. 1940)
- Origin: Menzies wins 1939 UAP leadership election
- Demise: Menzies' resignation
- Predecessor: Page government
- Successor: Fadden government

The Menzies government (1939–1941) refers to the federal executive government of Australia led by Prime Minister Robert Menzies. Menzies led the United Australia Party in the Australian Parliament from 1939 to 1941. Menzies served a later and longer term as prime minister as leader of a successor party, the Liberal Party of Australia from 1949 to 1966 (see Menzies government (1949–1966)).

== Background ==
The United Australia Party (UAP) was formed in 1931 as a response to the more radical proposals of Labor Party members to deal with the Great Depression. Led by former Labor minister and fiscal conservative Joseph Lyons, the new party swept into office in 1931 against the Australian Labor Party led by James Scullin. Labor had split over the issue of economic policy, with Lang Labor seeking to cease overseas debt repayments.

Lyons served seven years as prime minister, overseeing Australia's recovery from the Great Depression. Defence issues became increasingly dominant in public affairs with the rise of Fascism in Europe and militant Japan in Asia. Lyons negotiated a coalition with the Country Party, led by Earle Page, following the 1934 election, however the parties continued to differ on some questions of economic policy: the Country Party wanted low tariffs and opposed introduction of a national unemployment insurance scheme.

On 7 April 1939, with the storm clouds of the Second World War gathering in Europe and the Pacific, Joseph Lyons became the first Prime Minister of Australia to die in office, suffering a heart attack. The UAP's Deputy leader, Robert Menzies, now openly antipathetic to Country Party leader Earle Page, had resigned in March, citing the coalition's failure to implement a plan for national insurance as the cause for his resignation. In the absence of a UAP deputy, the Governor-General, Lord Gowrie, appointed Country Party leader Earl Page as his temporary replacement, pending the selection of Lyons' successor by the UAP.

The Country Party under Earle Page announced that they would refuse to work in coalition under a Menzies-led government. The UAP selected Menzies to succeed Lyons regardless.

== Terms in office ==
Robert Menzies was sworn in as Prime Minister of Australia for the first time on 26 April 1939, following the death of Joseph Lyons. He led a minority United Australia Party government – Country Party leader Earle Page had temporarily been Prime Minister after the death of Lyons, but he refused to serve in a government led by Menzies, and withdrew the support of the Country Party from coalition with the UAP.

In addition to the office of Prime Minister, Menzies was Treasurer. The First Menzies Ministry included the ageing former Prime Minister Billy Hughes and the young future Prime Minister Harold Holt. Menzies tried and failed to have the issue of national insurance examined by a committee of parliamentarians. Though no longer in formal coalition, his government survived because the Country Party preferred a UAP government to that of a Labor government.

The growing threat of war dominated politics through 1939. Menzies supported British policy against Hitler's Germany (negotiate for peace, but prepare for war) and – fearing Japanese intentions in the Pacific – established independent embassies in Tokyo and Washington to receive independent advice about developments.

On 3 September 1939, the prime minister, Robert Menzies, made a national radio broadcast:

My fellow Australians. It is my melancholy duty to inform you, officially, that, in consequence of the persistence by Germany in her invasion of Poland, Great Britain has declared war upon her, and that, as a result, Australia is also at war.

Australia had entered World War II. Earle Page, as leader of the Country and John Curtin as leader of the Labor Party both pledged support to the declaration of war. Australia was ill-prepared for war. A National Security Act was passed. The recruitment of a volunteer military force for service at home and abroad was announced, the 2nd Australian Imperial Force, and a citizen militia organised for local defence. Troubled by Britain's failure to increase defences at Singapore, Menzies was cautious in committing troops to Europe. In 1940–41, Australian forces played prominent roles in the fighting in the Mediterranean theatre, including Operation Compass, the Siege of Tobruk, the Greek campaign, the Battle of Crete, the Syria-Lebanon campaign and the Second Battle of El Alamein.

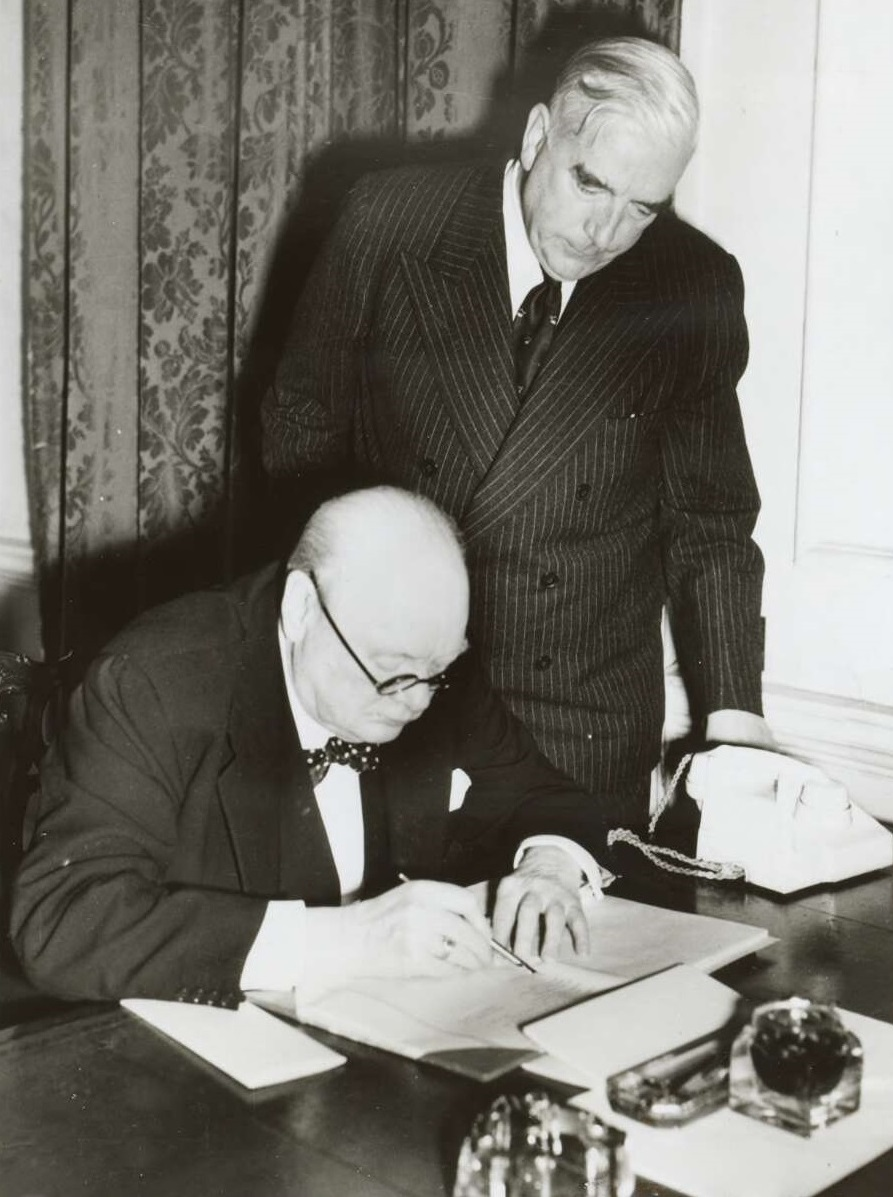
Prime Minister Robert Menzies and British Prime Minister Winston Churchill in 1941.

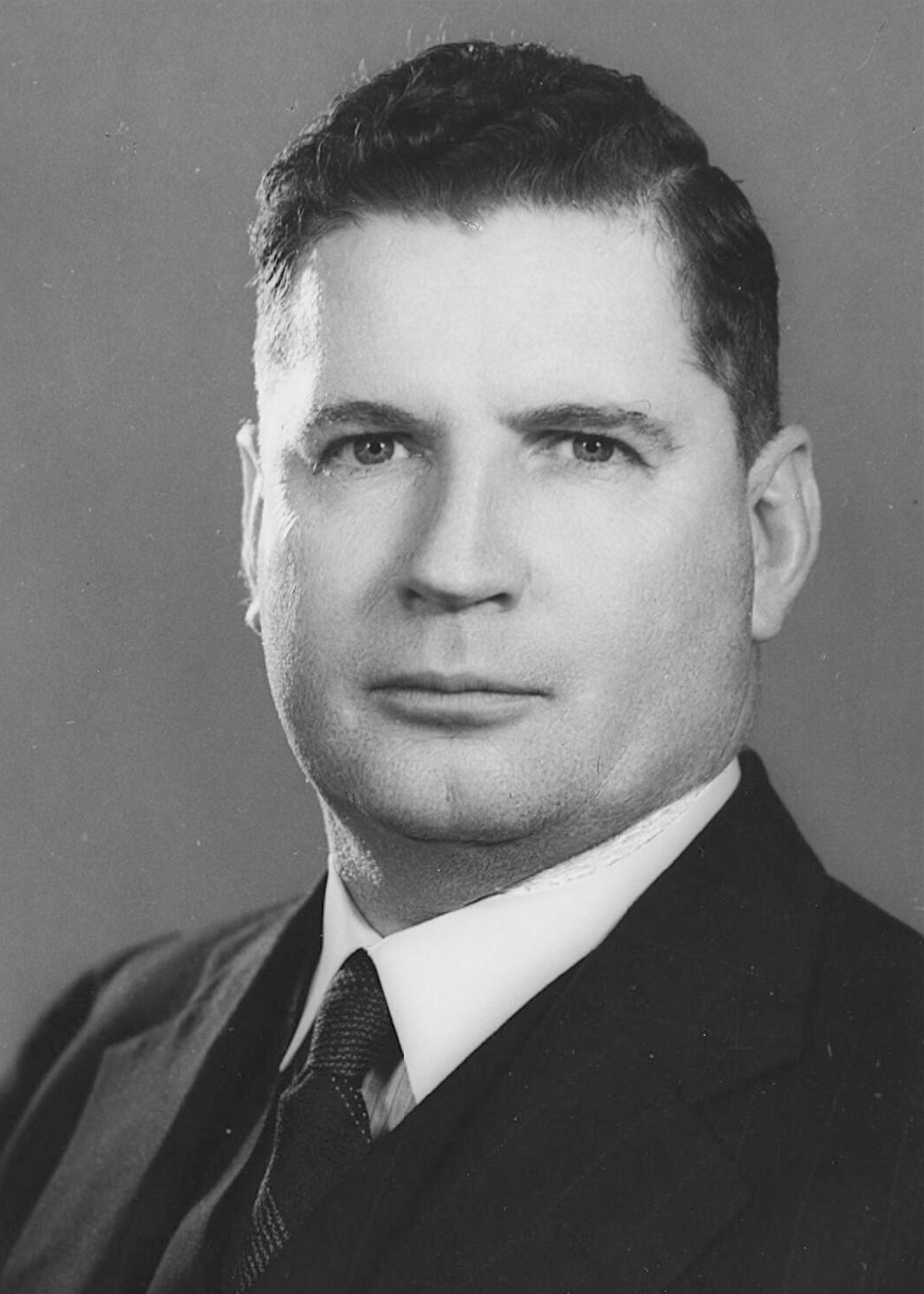
Arthur Fadden was Treasurer from October 1940 and was confirmed as leader of the Country Party from March 1941. The United Australia Party and Country Party operated in a troubled alliance during the terms of the first Menzies government.

A special War Cabinet was created after war was declared – initially composed of Prime Minister Menzies and five senior ministers (RG Casey, GA Street, Senator McLeay, HS Gullet and World War I Prime Minister Billy Hughes).

In January 1940, Menzies dispatched potential leadership rival Richard Casey to Washington as Australia's first "Minister to the United States". In a consequent by-election, the UAP suffered a heavy defeat and Menzies re-entered coalition negotiations with the Country Party. In March 1940, troubled negotiations were concluded with the Country Party to re-enter Coalition with the UAP. The replacement of Earl Page as leader by Archie Cameron allowed Menzies to reach accommodation. A new Coalition ministry was formed including the Country Party's Archie Cameron, Harold Thorby and John McEwen, as well as junior ministers Arthur Fadden and Horace Nock.

In Europe, the Phoney War gave way to a succession of Allied defeats, as Germany overran the Low Countries, Norway and France. By June 1940, the British Empire stood alone against Germany. Menzies called for an 'all in' war effort and with the support of Curtin, amended the National Security Act to extend government powers to tax, acquire property, control businesses and the labour force and allow for conscription of men for the "defence of Australia". Essington Lewis, the head of BHP was appointed Director-General of Munitions Supply to assist with mobilisation of national resources.

With the 1940 election looming, Menzies lost his Chief of the General Staff and three loyal ministers in a Royal Australian Air Force crash at Canberra Airport. In response, Menzies recalled Harold Holt, a minister who had resigned to join the army. The Labor Party meanwhile experienced a split along pro and anti Communist lines over policy towards the Soviet Union for its co-operation with Nazi Germany in the invasion of Poland. The Communist Party of Australia (CPA) opposed and sought to disrupt Australia's "imperialist" war effort against Nazism in the early stages of the War. Menzies banned the CPA after the Fall of France in 1940, but by 1941 Stalin was forced to join the Allied cause when Hitler reneged on the Pact and invaded the USSR. The USSR came to bear the brunt of the carnage of Hitler's war machine and the Communist Party in Australia lost its early war stigma as a result. In Menzies' later term of office, anti-communism became an important plank of his foreign policy.

Labor narrowly lost the September 1940 Election. The UAP–Country Party coalition and the Labor parties won 36 seats each and the Menzies government was forced to rely upon the support of two independents, Alex Wilson and Arthur Coles, to continue in office.

Menzies proposed an all-party unity government to break the impasse, but the Labor Party refused to join. John Curtin agreed instead to take a seat on a newly created Advisory War Council in October 1940. New Country Party leader Arthur Fadden became Treasurer and Menzies unhappily conceded to allow Earle Page back into his ministry.

In January 1941, Menzies flew to Britain to discuss the weakness of Singapore's defences and sat with Winston Churchill's British War Cabinet. En route he inspected Singapore's defences – finding them alarmingly inadequate – and visited Australian troops in the field Mid-East. Menzies was well received by the British press. He at times clashed with Churchill in the War Cabinet, and sought assurances for Australian involvement in the Greek campaign. He was unable to achieve significant assurances for increased commitment to Singapore's defences, but undertook morale boosting excursions to war-affected cities and factories. He spent eight successive weekend at Chequers with Churchill, addressed Parliament, stayed with the King, visited Dublin to lobby Ireland to join the war effort and generally raised awareness in Britain of Australia's contribution to its war effort. He returned to Australia via Canada and the United States, addressing the Canadian parliament and lobbying President Roosevelt for more arms production. After four months, Menzies returned to Australia to face a lack of enthusiasm for his global travels and a war-time minority government under ever-increasing strain.

In Menzies' absence, John Curtin had co-operated with Deputy Prime Minister Arthur Fadden of the Country Party in preparing Australia for the expected Pacific War. With the threat of Japan imminent and with the Australian Army suffering badly in the Greek and Crete campaigns, Menzies reorganised his ministry and announced multiple multi-party committees to advise on war and economic policy. Government critics however called for an all-party government. In August, Cabinet decided that Menzies should travel back to Britain to represent Australia in the War Cabinet – but this time the Labor caucus refused to support the plan. Menzies announced to his Cabinet that he thought he should resign and advise the Governor General to invite John Curtin to form a government. The Cabinet instead insisted he approach Curtin again to form a war cabinet. Unable to secure Curtin's support, and with an unworkable parliamentary majority, Menzies then resigned as prime minister on 29 August 1941.

The UAP-Country Party Coalition held office for another month with Arthur Fadden of the Country Party as prime minister, before the independents switched allegiance. On 3 October, the independents, Coles and Wilson, voted with Labor to defeat the government. John Curtin was sworn in as prime minister on 7 October 1941. Eight weeks later, Japan attacked Pearl Harbor.

== Demise of the United Australia Party ==
The UAP disintegrated after suffering a heavy defeat in the 1943 election. Menzies called a conference of conservative parties and other groups opposed to the ruling Australian Labor Party which met in Canberra on 13 October 1944, and again in Albury in December 1944. The formation of a new party – the Liberal Party of Australia – was formally announced at Sydney Town Hall on 31 August 1945.

After an initial loss to Labor at the 1946 election, Menzies led the Liberals to victory at the 1949 election against the incumbent Labor government led by Ben Chifley, and the Coalition stayed in office for a record 23 years.

== See also ==
- History of Australia
- History of Australia since 1945
- First Menzies Ministry
- Second Menzies Ministry
- Third Menzies Ministry
