= Frederick Stewart (Australian politician) =

Australian politician (1884–1961)

The Honourable Sir Frederick Stewart
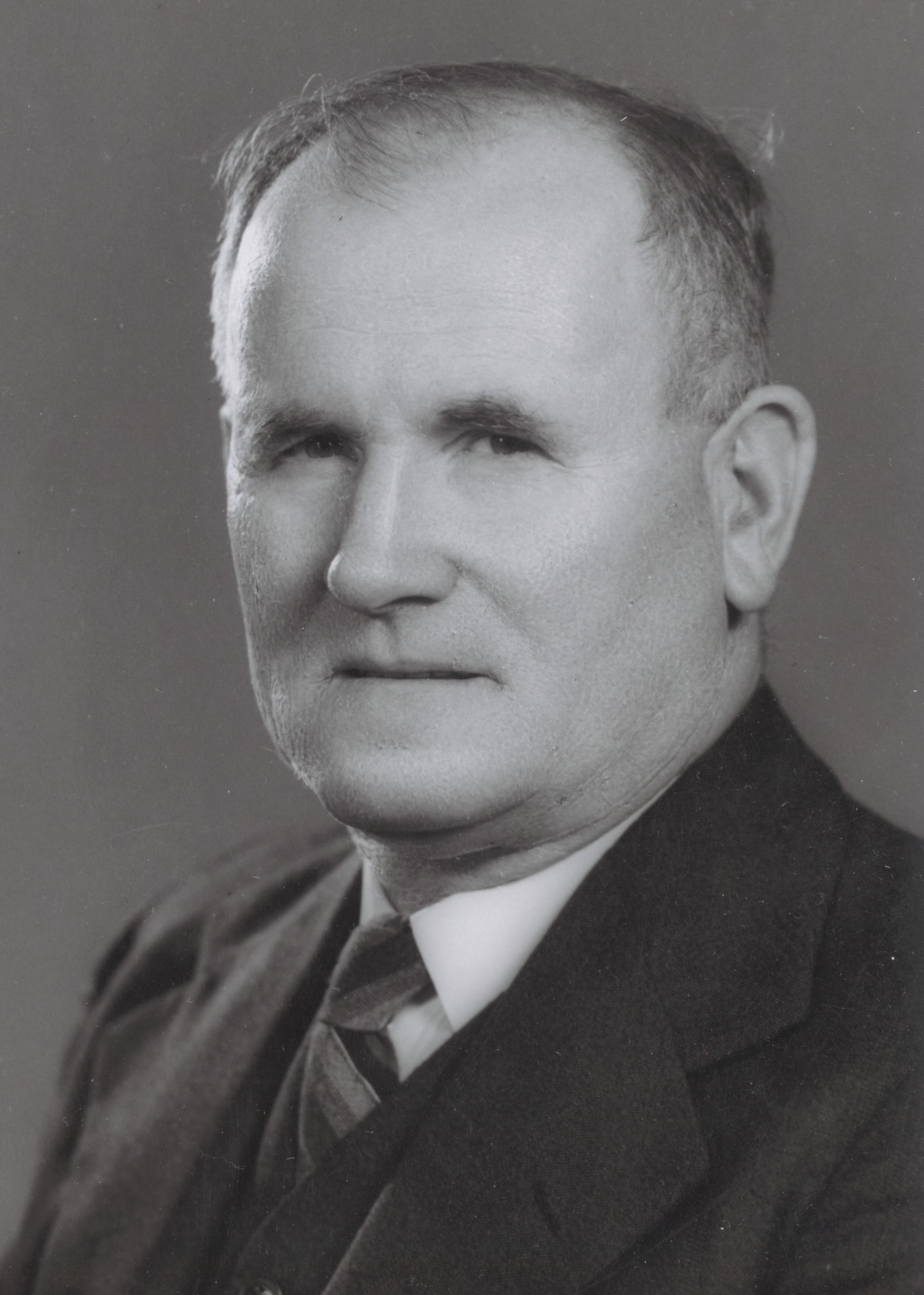

Member of the Australian Parliament for Parramatta
- In office 19 December 1931 – 16 August 1946
- Preceded by: Albert Rowe
- Succeeded by: Howard Beale

Personal details
- Born: 14 August 1884 Newcastle, New South Wales
- Died: 30 June 1961 (aged 76) St Leonards, Sydney
- Party: United Australia Party
- Spouse(s): 1) Lottie May Glover (died 1943); 2) Hilda Marjorie Evelyn Dixon
- Occupation: Administrative officer

Sir Frederick Harold Stewart (14 August 1884 – 30 June 1961) was an Australian businessman, politician and government minister. His continuing political commitment was to the establishment of a national insurance scheme and the shortening of working hours to improve social conditions during the Great Depression, despite the opposition of his own party.

== Early life ==
Stewart was born in Newcastle and educated in public schools in Newcastle and worked for 20 years as an administrative officer in the New South Wales Government Railways. In 1908 he married Lottie May Glover and they had six children. He was a prominent Methodist Lay Preacher. In 1919 Stewart developed the Sydney suburb of Chullora and owned the Metropolitan Omnibus Company that serviced the area. He also had an early interest in aviation and broadcasting. He established radio station 2CH and with Charles Kingsford Smith and Charles Ulm established Australian National Airways.

== Political career ==
Stewart failed to get pre-selection as a Nationalist candidate for the Australian House of Representatives seat of Martin at the 1929 election and ran unsuccessfully for the state seat of Concord at the 1930 election. He won the federal seat of Parramatta for the United Australia Party at the 1931 election and held it until his retirement before the 1946 election. He supported a shorter work week to reduce unemployment during the Great Depression and programs to improve social conditions such as national insurance and workers' housing schemes.

Stewart was appointed Minister for Commerce from October 1932 had responsibility for trade policy. In November 1934, he stood down to allow the Country Party to be brought into the ministry, with Earle Page becoming Minister for Commerce. He refused Joseph Lyons's offer of a junior ministry and instead became parliamentary under-secretary for employment, but resigned this position in February 1936 so that he could concentrate on his private scheme to improve social conditions. He was knighted in 1935. After the 1937 election, under pressure from Stewart, Lyons announced a limited national insurance scheme, but Stewart refused a position in Cabinet.

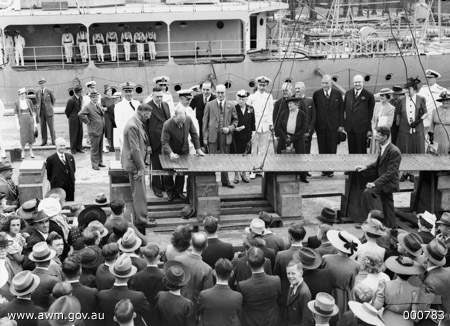
Stewart puts a rivet in the keel of HMAS Bathurst at the keel laying ceremony at Cockatoo Dockyard, Sydney, 10 February 1940

Stewart was appointed as Minister for Health and Minister for Social Services in Robert Menzies' ministry in April 1939 and continued to press for the implementation of a national insurance scheme. In November 1939, with the outbreak of World War II, he was given the additional portfolio of Minister for the Navy and in January 1940, he became in addition Minister for Supply and Development on Richard Casey's appointment as Ambassador to the United States. This portfolio was responsible for procuring supplies for the military. In March 1940, he lost the portfolios of health and the navy, but retained social services and supply and development in the second Menzies Ministry. He was criticised over his performance in supplying the military, despite such ingenuity as finding and refurbishing 15,000 World War I uniforms and he lost the supply portfolio from October 1940 in the third Menzies Ministry, but was appointed Minister for External Affairs, retained social services and regained health. He held the three portfolios until the fall of the Fadden government in October 1941. In opposition he served as chairman of the Joint Committee on Social Security in 1943 and 1944.

== Personal life ==
Stewart's first wife died in 1943 and in 1945 he married Hilda Marjorie Evelyn Dixon. He was a noted philanthropist following his retirement from parliament. He died at the Royal North Shore Hospital, St Leonards, survived by his wife and three daughters and two sons from his first marriage.

Political offices
Preceded by Joseph Lyons	Minister for Commerce; 1932–1934	Succeeded by Earle Page
Preceded by Harry Foll	Minister for Health; 1939–1940	Succeeded by Harold Thorby
New title	Minister for Social Services; 1939–1941	Succeeded by Jack Holloway
New title	Minister for the Navy; 1939–1940	Succeeded by Archie Cameron
Preceded by Richard Casey	Minister for Supply and Development; 1939–1940	Succeeded by Philip McBride
Preceded by John McEwen	Minister for External Affairs; 1940–1941	Succeeded by H. V. Evatt
Preceded by Harold Thorby	Minister for Health; 1940–1941	Succeeded by E.J. Holloway
Parliament of Australia
Preceded by Albert Rowe	Member for Parramatta; 1931–1946	Succeeded by Howard Beale
