= Harry Foll =

Australian politician

The Honourable Harry Foll
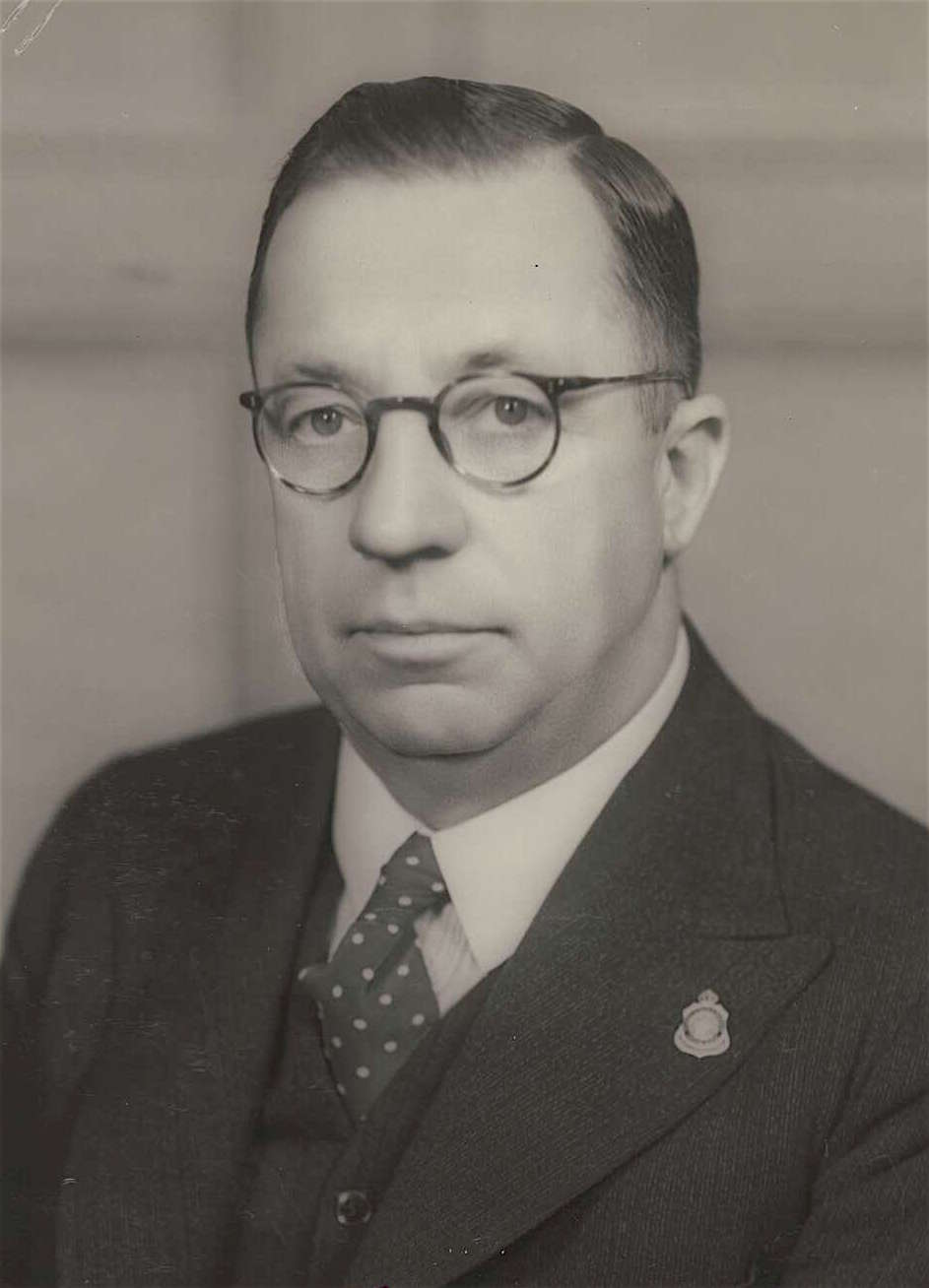

Minister for Information
- In office 13 December 1940 – 7 October 1941
- Prime Minister: Robert Menzies; Arthur Fadden
- Preceded by: Robert Menzies
- Succeeded by: Bill Ashley

Minister for the Interior
- In office 26 April 1939 – 7 October 1941
- Prime Minister: Robert Menzies; Arthur Fadden
- Preceded by: John McEwen
- Succeeded by: Joe Collings

Minister for Health
- In office 7 November 1938 – 26 April 1939
- Prime Minister: Joseph Lyons; Earle Page
- Preceded by: Earle Page
- Succeeded by: Frederick Stewart

Minister for Repatriation
- In office 29 November 1937 – 26 April 1939
- Prime Minister: Joseph Lyons; Earle Page
- Preceded by: Billy Hughes
- Succeeded by: Eric Harrison

Senator for Queensland
- In office 1 July 1917 – 30 June 1947

Personal details
- Born: 30 May 1890 Brixton, London, England
- Died: 7 July 1977 (aged 87) Port Macquarie, New South Wales, Australia
- Party: Nationalist (to 1931); UAP (1931–45); Liberal (from 1945)
- Spouse: Evelyn Mousley (m. 1915)

Hattil Spencer "Harry" Foll (30 May 1890 – 7 July 1977) was an Australian politician who served as a Senator for Queensland from 1917 to 1947. He took office at the age of 27, and at the time was the youngest person to serve in the Senate. Foll began his career in the Nationalist Party, later joining the United Australia Party (UAP) in 1931 and the Liberal Party in 1945. He held ministerial office as Minister for Repatriation (1937–1938), Minister for Health (1938–1939), Minister for the Interior (1939–1941), and Minister for Information (1940–1941). He was a member of the War Cabinet during World War II.

== Early life ==
Foll was born on 30 May 1890 in West Brixton, London, England. He was the second child of Kate (née Lamb) and John Hattil Foll; his father was a butcher. He disliked his given name (taken from an obscure Old Testament figure), and was always known as "Harry".

Foll grew up in Clapham, attending Holy Trinity School and Clapham College. He immigrated to Australia in 1909 with a friend and subsequently worked on Darr River Downs, a sheep station near Longreach in western Queensland. A year later he moved to Beenleigh to work as a bookkeeper and in 1911 he became a clerk in the Queensland Government Railways.

In August 1914, Foll enlisted in the first Australian Imperial Force and landed on the first day of the Gallipoli campaign. He was wounded in the head and leg on 19 May and was discharged medically unfit in February 1916. He married Evelyn Bush Mousley in December 1915 and they had a son (who died in infancy) and four daughters. He worked briefly as secretary to the state railways minister.

== Political career ==
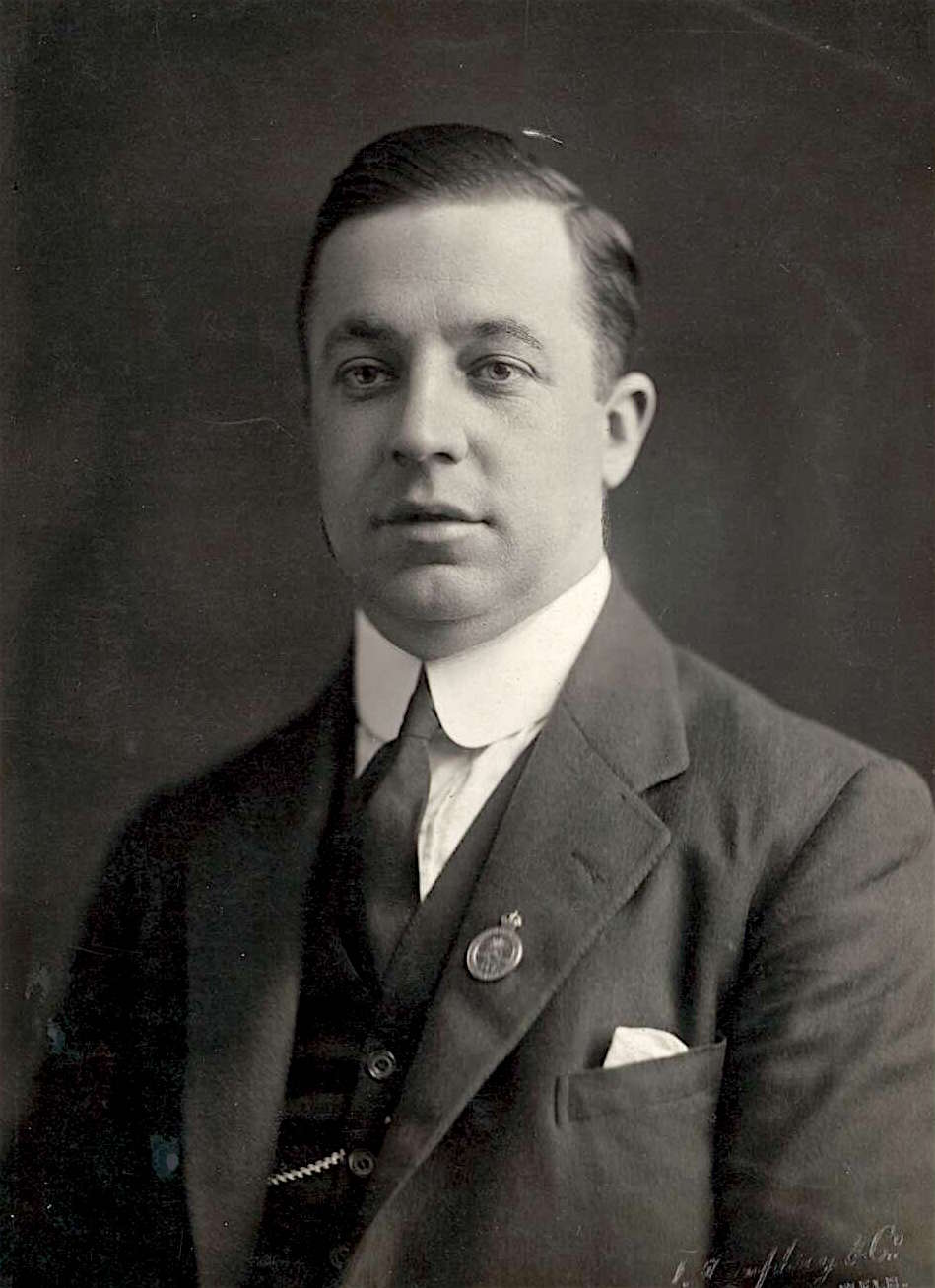
Foll early in his political career

Foll was elected to the Senate at the 1917 federal election as a Nationalist candidate. He and John Lister were the first returned servicemen from World War I to be elected to federal parliament, although Lister took his seat first. He was 26 years old at the time of his election, and 27 when his term began on 1 July 1917. He remained the youngest-ever senator until 1990, when Bill O'Chee (another Queenslander) was appointed at the age of 24.

Foll served continuously in the Senate until 1947, and from 1938 to 1947 he and Thomas Crawford were the joint Fathers of the Senate. He was a senator for 30 years; only six others have served for longer periods. Foll served as Chief Senate Whip for the Nationalists from 1926 to 1931. He became a member of the United Australia Party when it was formed from the shell of the Nationalist Party in 1931. He unsuccessfully stood for President of the Senate in 1935.

From 1938 until 1941, Foll served as a cabinet minister during the Prime Ministerships of Lyons, Menzies, Page and Fadden. He was Minister in Charge of War Service Homes from November 1937 until November 1938, Minister for Repatriation from November 1937 to April 1939, Minister for Health from November 1938 to April 1939, Minister for the Interior from April 1939 to October 1941 and Minister for Information from December 1940 to the fall of the Fadden government in October 1941. In 1939, Foll delivered a formal ministerial statement on the outbreak of the Second World War to the Senate, and announced the formation of the War Cabinet of which he became a member.

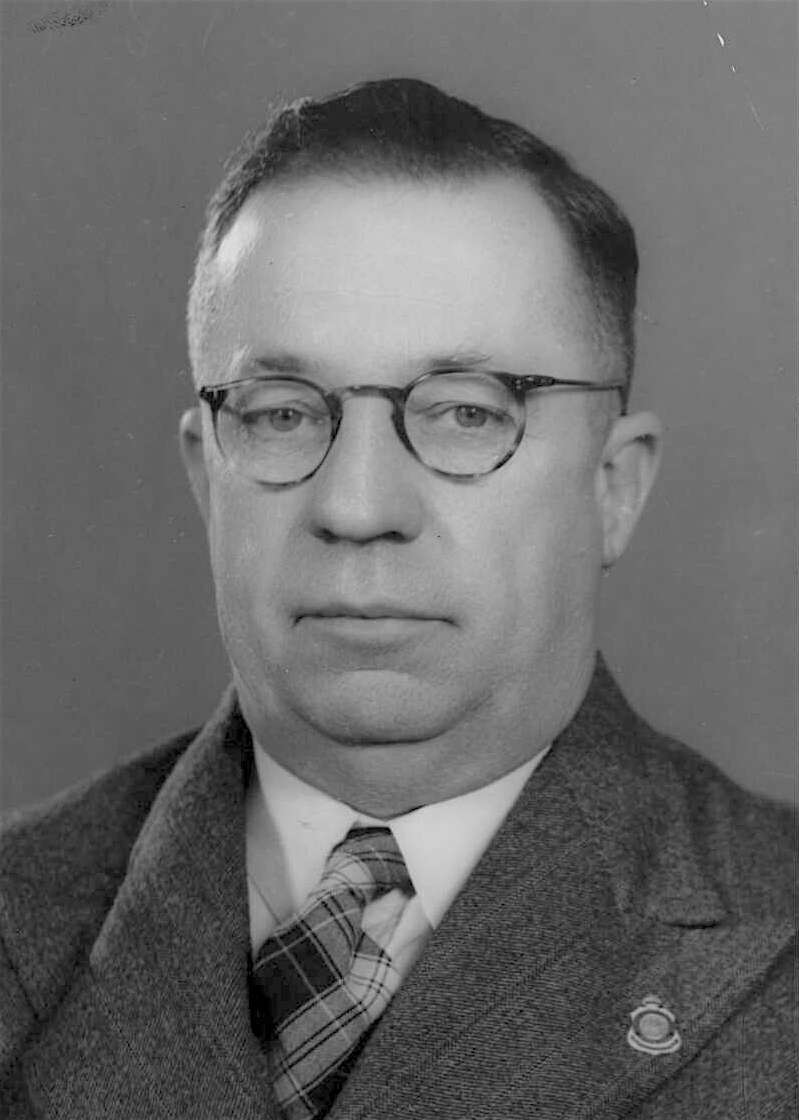
Foll c. 1940

In 1942, Foll enlisted in the Volunteer Defence Corps, putting his age back by one year. He continued to attend Senate sittings, for which he was granted leave without pay from the corps. Foll joined the Joint Committee on Social Security and the Committee on Censorship in 1944. The following year, he acted as Leader of the Opposition in the Senate in the absence of John Leckie, who himself had been substituting for George McLeay. Foll failed to win preselection from the Queensland People's Party (the state branch of the Liberal Party) prior to the 1946 federal election. His term ended on 1 July 1947.

Foll came into conflict with fellow Queensland senator Thomas Crawford, in part due to their respective claims to the title "Father of the Senate". In July 1941, Crawford "delivered a character assassination of Foll" in the Senate chamber, alleging a conflict of interest between Foll's business interests and his membership of the War Cabinet. Foll responded by attacking Crawford's poor attendance record and his association with the Australian Sugar Producers' Association, and alleging that he had authored anonymous defamatory letters. In October 1946, Foll took out a writ of defamation against Crawford in the Supreme Court of Queensland. The case was settled out of court in 1948, with Crawford paying Foll's costs.

== Later life ==
After leaving parliament, Foll became a grazier near Armidale, New South Wales. He wrote to Menzies complaining of financial difficulties and asked for employment to be found within the Liberal Party organisation, but none was forthcoming. He retired to Port Macquarie in 1957, and died there on 7 July 1977 at the age of 87; he was granted a state funeral. He was the last surviving member of parliament elected at the 1917 election.

Political offices
Preceded by Billy Hughes	Minister for Repatriation; 1937–39	Succeeded by Eric Harrison
Preceded by Earle Page	Minister for Health; 1938–39	Succeeded by Frederick Stewart
Preceded by John McEwen	Minister for the Interior; 1939–41	Succeeded by Joe Collings
Honorary titles
Preceded by Rudolph Ready	Earliest serving living Senator; 1958 – 1977	Succeeded by Guy Arkins
