= Fourth Menzies ministry =

34th ministry of government of Australia

- 34th Ministry of Australia

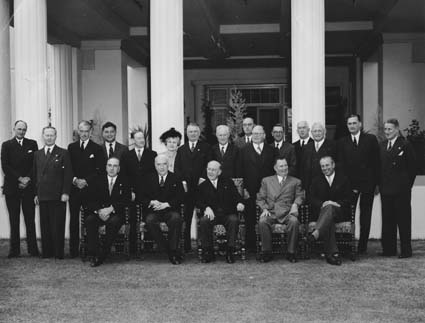
- The Fourth Menzies ministry at their swearing-in
- Date formed: 19 December 1949
- Date dissolved: 11 May 1951

People and organisations
- Monarch: George VI
- Governor-General: William McKell
- Prime Minister: Robert Menzies
- No. of ministers: 19
- Member party: Liberal–Country coalition
- Status in legislature: Coalition majority government
- Opposition party: Labor
- Opposition leader: Ben Chifley

History
- Election: 10 December 1949
- Outgoing election: 28 April 1951
- Legislature term: 19th
- Predecessor: Second Chifley ministry
- Successor: Fifth Menzies ministry

The Fourth Menzies ministry (Liberal–Country Coalition) was the 34th ministry of the Government of Australia. It was led by the country's 12th Prime Minister, Robert Menzies. The Fourth Menzies ministry succeeded the Second Chifley ministry, which dissolved on 19 December 1949 following the federal election that took place on 10 December which saw the Coalition defeat Ben Chifley's Labor Party. The ministry was replaced by the Fifth Menzies ministry on 11 May 1951 following the 1951 federal election.

Percy Spender, who died in 1985, was the last surviving member of the Fourth Menzies Ministry; Spender was also the last surviving minister of the first Menzies government and the Fadden government. John McEwen was the last surviving Country minister.

== Ministry ==
| Party | Minister | Portrait | Portfolio |
|---|---|---|---|
| Liberal | Robert Menzies (1894–1978) MP for Kooyong (1934–1966) | | Prime Minister; Leader of the Liberal Party; Vice-President of the Executive Council (from 7 March 1951) |
| Country | Arthur Fadden (1894–1973) MP for McPherson (1949–1958) | | Leader of the Country Party; Treasurer |
| Liberal | Eric Harrison (1892–1974) MP for Wentworth (1931–1956) | | Deputy Leader of the Liberal Party; Minister for Defence (to 24 October 1950); Minister for Postwar Reconstruction (to 17 March 1950); Minister for the Interior (from 24 October 1950) |
| Liberal | Percy Spender (1897–1985) MP for Warringah (1937–1951) | | Minister for External Affairs (to 26 April 1951); Minister for External Territories (to 26 April 1951) |
| Liberal | Harold Holt (1908–1967) MP for Higgins (1949–1967) | | Minister for Labour and National Service; Minister for Immigration |
| Country | John McEwen (1900–1980) MP for Murray (1949–1971) | | Deputy Leader of the Country Party; Minister for Commerce and Agriculture |
| Liberal | Richard Casey (1890–1976) MP for La Trobe (1949–1960) | | Minister for Works and Housing; Minister for Supply and Development (to 17 March 1950); Minister for National Development (from 17 March 1950); Minister in charge of the Commonwealth Scientific and Industrial Research Organisation (from 23 March 1950); Minister for External Affairs (from 26 April 1951); Minister for External Territories (from 26 April 1951) |
| Liberal | Philip McBride (1892–1982) MP for Wakefield (1946–1958) | | Minister for the Interior (to 24 October 1950); Minister for Defence (from 24 October 1950) |
| Liberal | John Spicer (1899–1978) Senator for Victoria (1950–1956) | | Attorney-General |
| Liberal | Neil O'Sullivan (1900–1968) Senator for Queensland (1947–1962) | | Leader of the Government in the Senate; Minister for Trade and Customs |
| Liberal | Howard Beale (1898–1983) MP for Parramatta (1946–1958) | | Minister for Information (to 17 March 1950); Minister for Transport (to 17 March 1950); Minister for Supply (from 17 March 1950) |
| Liberal | George McLeay (1892–1955) Senator for South Australia (1950–1955) | | Minister for Shipping and Fuel (to 17 March 1950); Minister for Fuel, Shipping and Transport (from 17 March 1950) |
| Country | Larry Anthony (1897–1957) MP for Richmond (1937–1957) | | Postmaster-General |
| Liberal | Dame Enid Lyons (1897–1981) MP for Darwin (1943–1951) | | Vice-President of the Executive Council (to 7 March 1951) |
| Country | Sir Earle Page (1880–1961) MP for Cowper (1919–1961) | | Minister for Health |
| Liberal | Thomas White (1888–1957) MP for Balaclava (1929–1951) | | Minister for Air; Minister for Civil Aviation |
| Liberal | Josiah Francis (1890–1964) MP for Moreton (1922–1955) | | Minister for the Army; Minister for the Navy |
| Liberal | Bill Spooner (1897–1966) Senator for New South Wales (1950–1965) | | Minister for Social Services |
| Country | Walter Cooper (1888–1973) Senator for Queensland (1935–1968) | | Minister for Repatriation |
