= Department of Information (Australia) =

Australian government department, 1939–1950

Department overview
- Formed: 12 September 1939
- Dissolved: 16 March 1950
- Headquarters: Melbourne

The Department of Information (DOI) was an Australian Government department formed during World War II.

The department was established in September 1939 under the leadership of John Treloar, the director of the Australian War Memorial, who remained in the role of departmental secretary until early 1941. It was the first of 17 new Australian Government departments to be established during the war, and was responsible for both censorship and disseminating government propaganda. The department was based in Melbourne throughout its existence, though it established divisions in Sydney and bureaus in New York City and London. The DOI was broken up in 1950, with its functions being allocated between other departments.

Henry Gullett was the first Minister for Information.

The Australian News and Information Bureau (ANIB) was created within the DOI in 1940, based in New York City, with the main goal of informing the United States of Australia's war effort, thereby nurturing and building the relationship between the two countries. The agency later evolved into the Australian Information Service, eventually becoming part of Department of Foreign Affairs and Trade.

== Ministers for Information ==
#	Name	Party	Start	End	Government
1	Henry Gullett	United Australia	12 September 1939	14 March 1940	Menzies
2	Robert Menzies	United Australia	14 March 1940	13 December 1940	Menzies
3	Harry Foll	United Australia	13 December 1940	7 October 1941	Menzies
3	Harry Foll	United Australia	13 December 1940	7 October 1941	Fadden
4	Bill Ashley	Labor	7 October 1941	21 September 1943	Curtin
5	Arthur Calwell	Labor	21 September 1943	19 December 1949	Curtin
5	Arthur Calwell	Labor	21 September 1943	19 December 1949	Forde
5	Arthur Calwell	Labor	21 September 1943	19 December 1949	Chifley
6	Howard Beale	Liberal	19 December 1949	16 March 1950	Menzies

== References and further reading ==
- Lakin, Shuane (2006). Contact: Photographs from the Australian War Memorial Collection. Canberra: Australian War Memorial. ISBN 0-9751904-6-6.
- Vickery, Edward Louis (2009). "Telling Australia's story to the world: The Department of Information 1939-1950". Thesis. Australian National University. Archived from the original on 14 August 2011.
