= Bruce Ministry =

Bruce Ministry may refer to:

- First Bruce Ministry
- Second Bruce Ministry
- Third Bruce Ministry
