= Fifth Hughes ministry =

15th ministry of government of Australia

- 15th Ministry of Australia

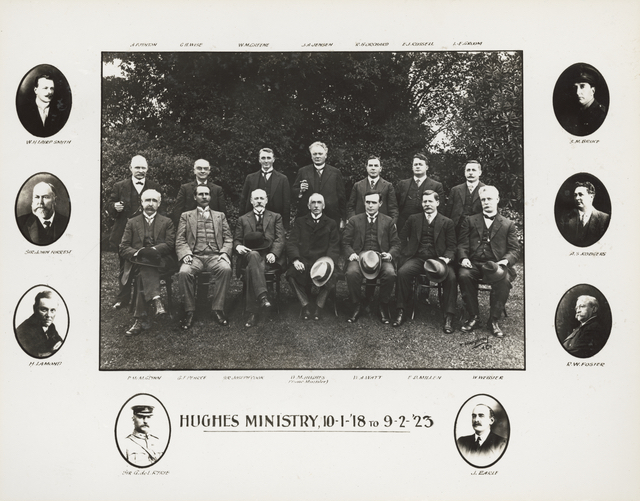
- Group photo of the Hughes ministry
- Date formed: 3 February 1920
- Date dissolved: 9 February 1923

People and organisations
- Monarch: George V
- Governor-General: Sir Ronald Munro Ferguson; Lord Forster
- Prime Minister: Billy Hughes
- No. of ministers: 17
- Member party: Nationalist
- Status in legislature: Minority government
- Opposition party: Labor
- Opposition leader: Frank Tudor; Matthew Charlton

History
- Election: 13 December 1919
- Outgoing election: 16 December 1922
- Legislature term: 8th
- Predecessor: Fourth Hughes ministry
- Successor: First Bruce ministry

The Fifth Hughes ministry (Nationalist) was the 15th ministry of the Government of Australia. It was led by the country's 7th Prime Minister, Billy Hughes. The Fifth Hughes ministry succeeded the Fourth Hughes ministry, which dissolved on 3 February 1920 following the federal election that took place in December. The ministry was replaced by the First Bruce ministry on 9 February 1923 following the 1922 federal election and the subsequent resignation of Hughes as Prime Minister.

Stanley Bruce, who died in 1967, was the last surviving member of the Fifth Hughes ministry; Bruce was also the last surviving member of the First Bruce ministry and the Second Bruce ministry.

== Ministry ==
Party	Minister	Portrait	Portfolio
Nationalist	Billy Hughes (1862–1952) MP for Bendigo (1917–1922) MP for North Sydney (1922–1949)		Prime Minister; Leader of the Nationalist Party; Attorney-General (to 21 December 1921); Minister for External Affairs (from 21 December 1921)
Nationalist	Sir Joseph Cook (1860–1947) MP for Parramatta (1901–1921)		Deputy Leader of the Nationalist Party (to 11 November 1921); Minister for the Navy (to 28 July 1920); Treasurer (from 28 July 1920 to 11 November 1921)
Nationalist	William Watt (1871–1946) MP for Balaclava (1914–1929)		Treasurer (to 15 June 1920)
Nationalist	Littleton Groom (1867–1936) MP for Darling Downs (1901–1929)		Minister for Works and Railways (to 21 December 1921); Attorney-General (from 21 December 1921)
Nationalist	Alexander Poynton (1853–1935) MP for Grey (1903–1922)		Minister for Home and Territories (to 21 December 1921); Postmaster-General (from 21 December 1921)
Nationalist	Walter Massy-Greene (1874–1952) MP for Richmond (1910–1922)		Minister for Trade and Customs (to 21 December 1921); Minister for Health (from 10 February 1921); Minister for Defence (from 21 December 1921)
Nationalist	George Pearce (1870–1952) Senator for Western Australia (1901–1938)		Minister for Defence (to 21 December 1921); Minister for Home and Territories (from 21 December 1921)
Nationalist	Edward Millen (1860–1923) Senator for New South Wales (1901–1923)		Minister for Repatriation; Leader of the Government in the Senate
Nationalist	George Wise (1853–1950) MP for Gippsland (1914–1922)		Postmaster-General (to 21 December 1921)
Nationalist	Edward Russell (1878–1925) Senator for Victoria (1907–1925)		Vice-President of the Executive Council (to 21 December 1921)
Nationalist	William Laird Smith (1869–1942) MP for Denison (1910–1922)		Honorary Minister (to 28 July 1920); Minister for the Navy (from 28 July 1920 to 21 December 1921)
Nationalist	Sir Granville Ryrie (1865–1937) MP for North Sydney (1911–1922)		Assistant Minister for Defence (to 21 December 1921)
Nationalist	Arthur Rodgers (1876–1936) MP for Wannon (1913–1922) (in Ministry from 28 July 1920)		Assistant Minister for Repatriation (from 28 July 1920 to 21 December 1921); Minister for Trade and Customs (from 21 December 1921)
Nationalist	Stanley Bruce (1883–1967) MP for Flinders (1918–1929) (in Ministry from 21 December 1921)		Treasurer (from 21 December 1921); Deputy Leader of the Nationalist Party (from 11 November 1921)
Nationalist	Richard Foster (1856–1932) MP for Wakefield (1909–1928) (in Ministry from 21 December 1921)		Minister for Works and Railways (from 21 December 1921)
Nationalist	John Earle (1865–1932) Senator for Tasmania (1917–1923) (in Ministry from 21 December 1921)		Vice-President of the Executive Council (from 21 December 1921)
Nationalist	Hector Lamond (1865–1947) MP for Illawarra (1917–1922) (in Ministry from 21 December 1921)		Assistant Minister for Repatriation (from 21 December 1921)
