= John Munro Bruce =

Australian politician

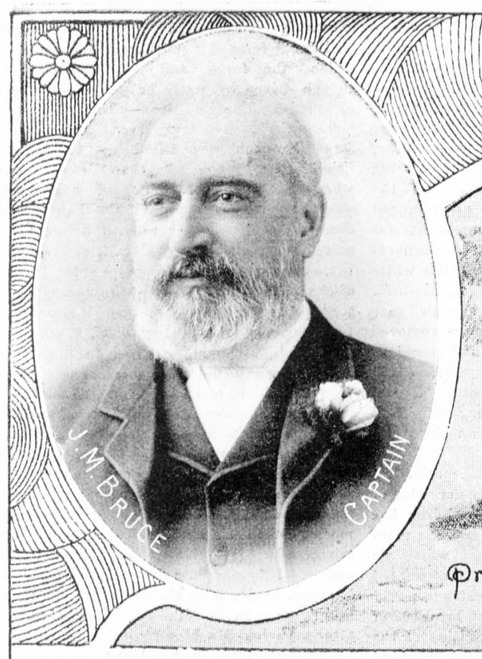
- Bruce in 1894
- Born: 10 October 1840; Brooklawn, County Leitrim, Ireland
- Died: 4 May 1901 (aged 60); Hôtel Régina, Paris, France
- Education: Madras College
- Occupation: Businessman
- Spouse: Mary Ann Henderson (m. 1872)
- Relatives: Stanley Bruce (son)

John Munro Bruce (10 October 1840 – 4 May 1901) was an Australian businessman. He was born in Ireland to Scottish parents and arrived in the colony of Victoria at the age of 18. He became the managing director and eventual majority shareholder in Paterson, Laing & Bruce, one of Melbourne's leading softgoods firms. He also held a number of civic positions, including as the founding club captain of the Royal Melbourne Golf Club. His son Stanley Bruce became prime minister of Australia.

== Early life ==
Bruce was born on 10 October 1840 in Brooklawn, County Leitrim, Ireland. He was the son of Mary (née Munro, also spelled Monro or Monroe) and George Williamson Bruce. His family was Scottish, originating in East Ayrshire. After his father's early death, Bruce was sent to Scotland to attend Madras College in St Andrews. He rejoined his mother in Newry in 1853 and was apprenticed to Henry Hawkins & Co., a linen firm. He was largely self-educated, as was his brother William Duff Bruce who became a civil engineer in India.

== Business career ==
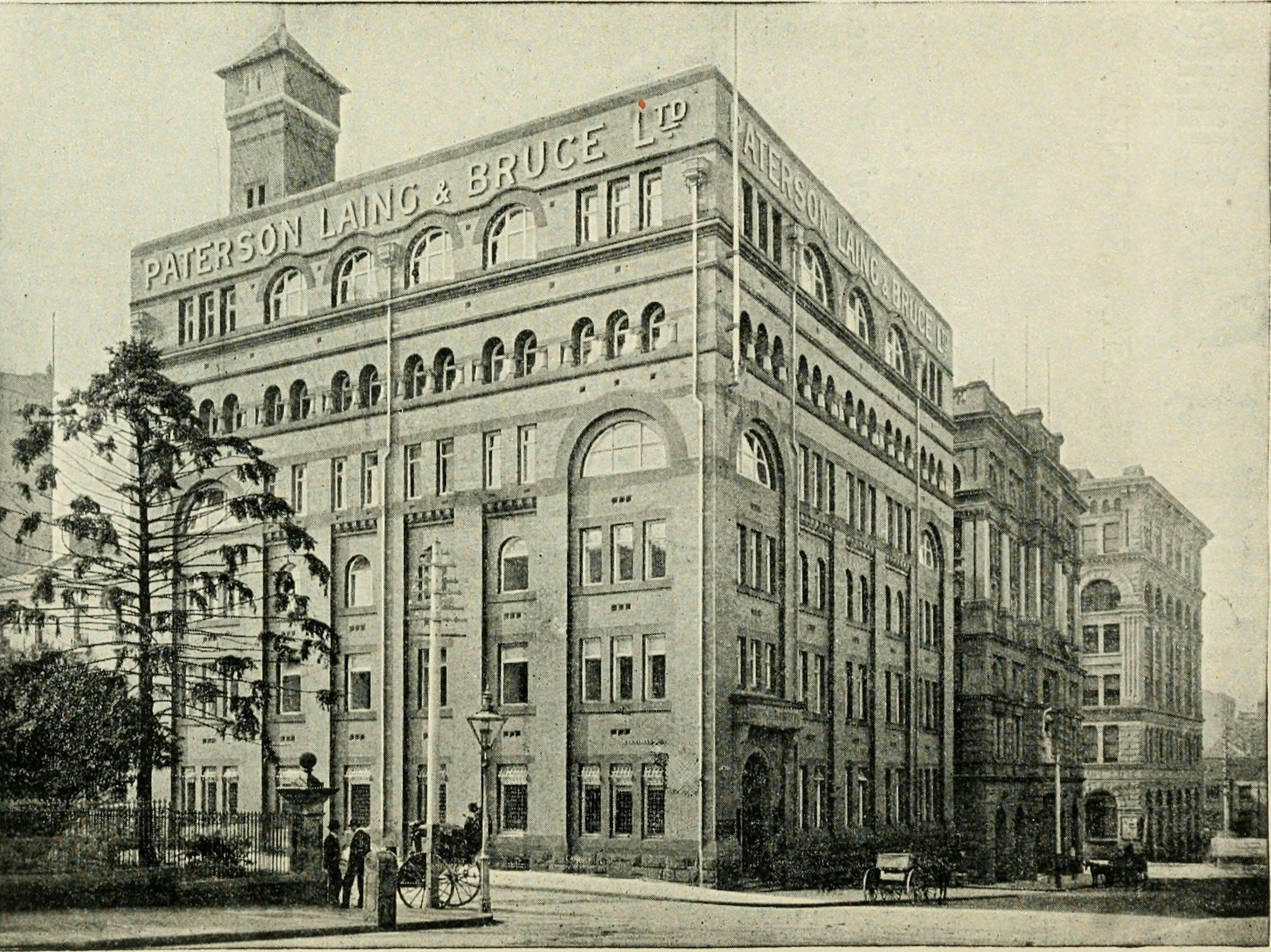
Paterson, Laing & Bruce warehouse, c. 1901

With few prospects in Ireland, Bruce decided to immigrate to Australia after completing his apprenticeship. He arrived in Melbourne in December 1858 aboard the Ellen Stuart. He joined Laing & Webster in 1860, and was a partner by 1868. In 1878, he joined a softgoods firm which became Paterson, Laing & Bruce, with himself as managing partner. By 1883 its warehouse was the largest in Victoria. Bruce was the president of the Warehousemen's Association and the Softgoods Association. He led the business through the depression associated with the Australian banking crisis of 1893, but lost much of his personal fortune.

In 1897, Bruce bought out his partners with the aid of the Bank of New South Wales, which loaned him £100,000 (equivalent to $17,227,000 in 2022). He subsequently floated Paterson, Laing & Bruce as a limited liability company with himself as chairman of the board and majority shareholder. In 1899, he acquired two other existing businesses in other cities – Lark Sons & Co. in Sydney and R. Lewis & Sons in Hobart – and expanded the company's warehouse on Flinders Lane.

== Marriage and family life ==
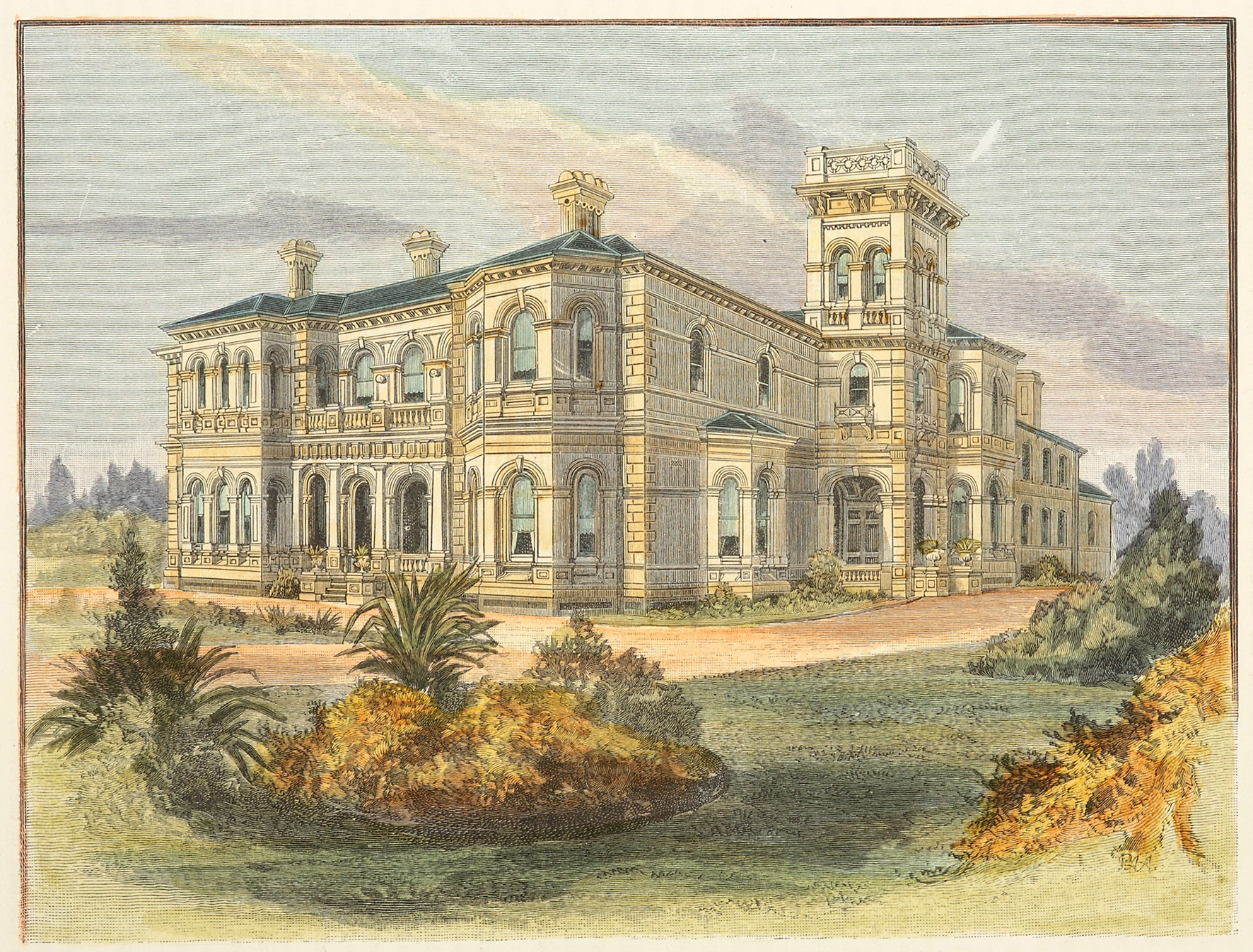
Wombalano, Bruce's mansion in Toorak

Bruce married Mary Ann Henderson on 28 May 1872. The couple had five children together: Mary (1873-1912), Ernest John Webster (1874-1919), William Crawford (1876-1899), Robert Laing (1878-1956), and Stanley Melbourne (1883-1967). His youngest son became the eighth prime minister of Australia. Stanley remembered his father as aloof and stern with his children, although with a charming, genial, and urbane public persona.

In 1883, Bruce purchased 5 acres (2.0 ha) of land in Toorak. He built a thirty-room Italianate mansion named Wombalano, at a cost of £20,000 (equivalent to $3,124,000 in 2022). According to The Australasian in 1891, it was positioned "on the crown of the hill at Toorak, commanding one of the finest panoramas in the neighbourhood of Melbourne". The property contained a lengthy carriage-drive, tennis court, stables, coach-house, and gardens. In the summer the family retreated to a "country residence" at Scoresby. Bruce sold Wombalano due to financial difficulties in the early 1890s.

== Public life ==
Bruce was a commissioner of the Melbourne Harbor Trust from 1883 to 1890, and was a delegate to intercolonial commerce conferences in 1883 and 1888. He was president of the YMCA and the Melbourne Hospital, and a commissioner of the Melbourne Centennial Exhibition in 1888. He had some interest in politics, supporting the government formed by Duncan Gillies and Alfred Deakin after the 1886 general election. Bruce had learned golf in Scotland and brought clubs with him to Australia after one of his business trips. He subsequently played a leading role in the formation of the Melbourne Golf Club in 1891, becoming the inaugural club captain.

== Death ==
Bruce died in Paris on 4 May 1901 while returning from a business trip to London. He suffered fatal injuries after falling from a window at the Hôtel Régina. A police investigation concluded that he had committed suicide due to business difficulties and health problems. He had been suffering from liver disease and diabetes. His family did not make the cause of death public and instead attributed it to "wear and tear on his own and the community's behalf". Bruce had been preceded in death by his second son William, who in 1899 jumped in front of a train while undergoing treatment at an asylum in Sydney. His oldest son Ernest shot himself in an English convalescent home in 1919.
