= Third Bruce ministry =

18th ministry of the government of Australia

- 18th Ministry of Australia

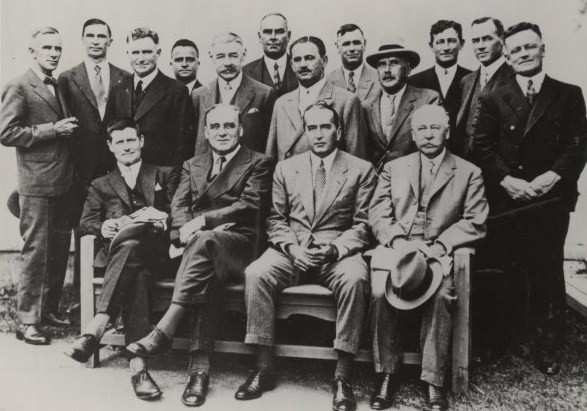
- Group photo of the Third Bruce ministry
- Date formed: 29 November 1928
- Date dissolved: 22 October 1929

People and organisations
- Monarch: George V
- Governor-General: Lord Stonehaven
- Prime Minister: Stanley Bruce
- No. of ministers: 13
- Member party: Nationalist–Country coalition
- Status in legislature: Coalition majority government
- Opposition party: Labor
- Opposition leader: James Scullin

History
- Election: 17 November 1928
- Outgoing election: 12 October 1929
- Legislature term: 11th
- Predecessor: Second Bruce ministry
- Successor: Scullin ministry

The Third Bruce ministry (Nationalist–Country Coalition) was the 18th ministry of the Government of Australia. It was led by the country's 8th Prime Minister, Stanley Bruce. The Third Bruce ministry succeeded the Second Bruce ministry, which dissolved on 29 November 1928 following the federal election that took place in November. The ministry was replaced by the Scullin ministry on 22 October 1929 following the federal election that took place on 12 October which saw Labor defeat the Coalition. That election also saw Bruce lose his own seat of Flinders; no sitting prime minister would lose his own seat again until 2007.

Aubrey Abbott, who died in 1975, was the last surviving member of the Third Bruce ministry. Stanley Bruce was the last surviving Nationalist minister.

== Ministry ==
Party	Minister	Portrait	Portfolio
Nationalist	Stanley Bruce (1883–1967) MP for Flinders (1918–1929)		Prime Minister; Leader of the Nationalist Party; Minister for External Affairs
Country	Earle Page (1880–1961) MP for Cowper (1919–1961)		Leader of the Country Party; Treasurer
Nationalist	Sir George Pearce (1870–1952) Senator for Western Australia (1901–1938)		Vice-President of the Executive Council; Leader of the Government in the Senate
Nationalist	John Latham (1877–1964) MP for Kooyong (1922–1934)		Attorney-General; Minister for Industry (from 10 December 1928)
Country	Aubrey Abbott (1886–1975) MP for Gwydir (1925–1929)		Minister for Home and Territories (to 10 December 1928); Minister for Home Affairs (from 10 December 1928)
Nationalist	Henry Gullett (1878–1940) MP for Henty (1925–1940)		Minister for Trade and Customs
Nationalist	Sir William Glasgow (1876–1955) Senator for Queensland (1920–1932)		Minister for Defence
Country	William Gibson (1869–1955) MP for Corangamite (1918–1929)		Deputy Leader of the Country Party; Postmaster-General; Minister for Works and Railways (from 10 December 1928)
Nationalist	Sir Neville Howse (1863–1930) MP for Calare (1922–1929)		Minister for Health
Country	Thomas Paterson (1882–1952) MP for Gippsland (1922–1943)		Minister for Markets (to 10 December 1928); Minister for Markets and Transport (from 10 December 1928)
Nationalist	Charles Marr (1880–1960) MP for Parkes (1919–1929)		Honorary Minister
Nationalist	Alexander McLachlan (1872–1956) Senator for South Australia (1926–1944)		Honorary Minister
Nationalist	James Ogden (1868–1932) Senator for Tasmania (1923–1932)		Honorary Minister; Assistant Minister for Industry
