= Second Bruce ministry =

17th ministry of the Government of Australia

- 17th Ministry of Australia

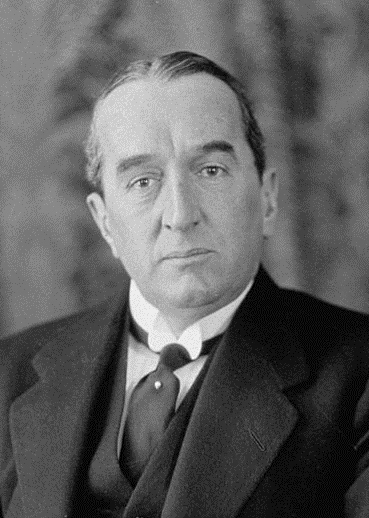
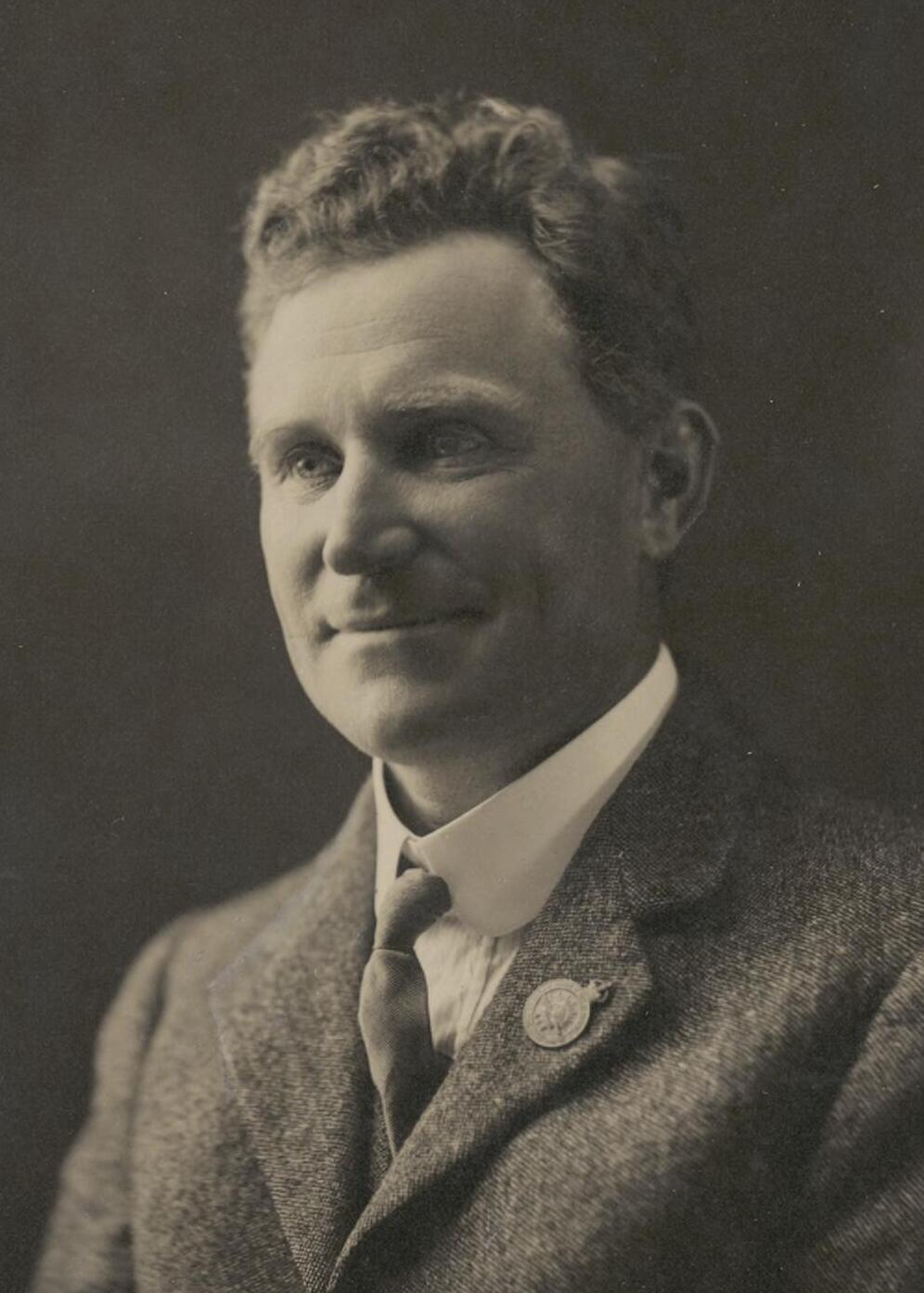
- Stanley Bruce Earle Page
- Date formed: 18 December 1925
- Date dissolved: 29 November 1928

People and organisations
- Monarch: George V
- Governor-General: Lord Stonehaven
- Prime Minister: Stanley Bruce
- No. of ministers: 15
- Member party: Nationalist–Country coalition
- Status in legislature: Coalition majority government
- Opposition party: Labor
- Opposition leader: Matthew Charlton; James Scullin

History
- Election: 14 November 1925
- Outgoing election: 17 November 1928
- Legislature term: 10th
- Predecessor: First Bruce ministry
- Successor: Third Bruce ministry

The Second Bruce ministry (Nationalist–Country Coalition) was the 17th ministry of the Government of Australia. It was led by the country's 8th Prime Minister, Stanley Bruce. The Second Bruce ministry succeeded the First Bruce ministry, which dissolved on 18 December 1925 following the federal election that took place in November. The ministry was replaced by the Third Bruce ministry on 29 November 1928 following the 1928 federal election.

Stanley Bruce, who died in 1967, was the last surviving member of the Second Bruce ministry; Bruce was also the last surviving member of the Fifth Hughes ministry and the First Bruce ministry. Earle Page was the last surviving Country minister.

== Ministry ==
Party	Minister	Portrait	Portfolio
Nationalist	Stanley Bruce (1883–1967) MP for Flinders (1918–1929)		Prime Minister; Leader of the Nationalist Party; Minister for External Affairs; Minister for Health (from 2 April 1927 to 24 February 1928); Minister for Trade and Customs (from 8 May 1928)
Country	Earle Page (1880–1961) MP for Cowper (1919–1961)		Leader of the Country Party; Treasurer
Nationalist	Sir George Pearce (1870–1952) Senator for Western Australia (1901–1938)		Minister for Home and Territories (to 18 June 1926); Vice-President of the Executive Council (from 18 June 1926); Leader of the Government in the Senate
Nationalist	John Latham (1877–1964) MP for Kooyong (1922–1934)		Attorney-General
Nationalist	Herbert Pratten (1865–1928) MP for Martin (1922–1928)		Minister for Trade and Customs (to 7 May 1928)
Nationalist	Sir Neville Howse (1863–1930) MP for Calare (1922–1929)		Minister for Defence (to 2 April 1927); Minister for Health (to 2 April 1927; from 24 February 1928); Honorary Minister (from 2 April 1927 to 24 February 1928); Minister for Home and Territories (from 24 February 1928)
Nationalist	Sir Victor Wilson (1877–1957) Senator for South Australia (1920–1926)		Minister for Markets and Migration (to 18 June 1926)
Country	William Gibson (1869–1955) MP for Corangamite (1918–1929)		Deputy Leader of the Country Party; Postmaster-General
Country	William Hill (1866–1939) MP for Echuca (1919–1934)		Minister for Works and Railways
Country	Llewellyn Atkinson (1867–1945) MP for Wilmot (1906–1929)		Vice-President of the Executive Council (to 18 June 1926)
Nationalist	Charles Marr (1880–1960) MP for Parkes (1919–1929)		Chief Government Whip in the House (to 6 September 1927); Honorary Minister (to 2 April 1927; from 24 February 1928); Minister for Home and Territories (from 2 April 1927 to 24 February 1928)
Nationalist	Thomas Crawford (1865–1948) Senator for Queensland (1917–1947)		Honorary Minister
Nationalist	Sir William Glasgow (1876–1955) Senator for Queensland (1920–1932) (in Ministry from 18 June 1926)		Minister for Home and Territories (from 18 June 1926 to 2 April 1927); Minister for Defence (from 2 April 1927)
Country	Thomas Paterson (1882–1952) MP for Gippsland (1922–1943) (in Ministry from 18 June 1926)		Minister for Markets and Migration (from 18 June 1926 to 19 January 1928); Minister for Markets (from 19 January 1928)
Nationalist	Alexander McLachlan (1872–1956) Senator for South Australia (1926–1944) (in Ministry from 29 August 1926)		Honorary Minister (from 29 August 1926)
