= Stanley Bruce =

Prime Minister of Australia from 1923 to 1929

The Right Honourable The Viscount Bruce of Melbourne CH MC PC FRS
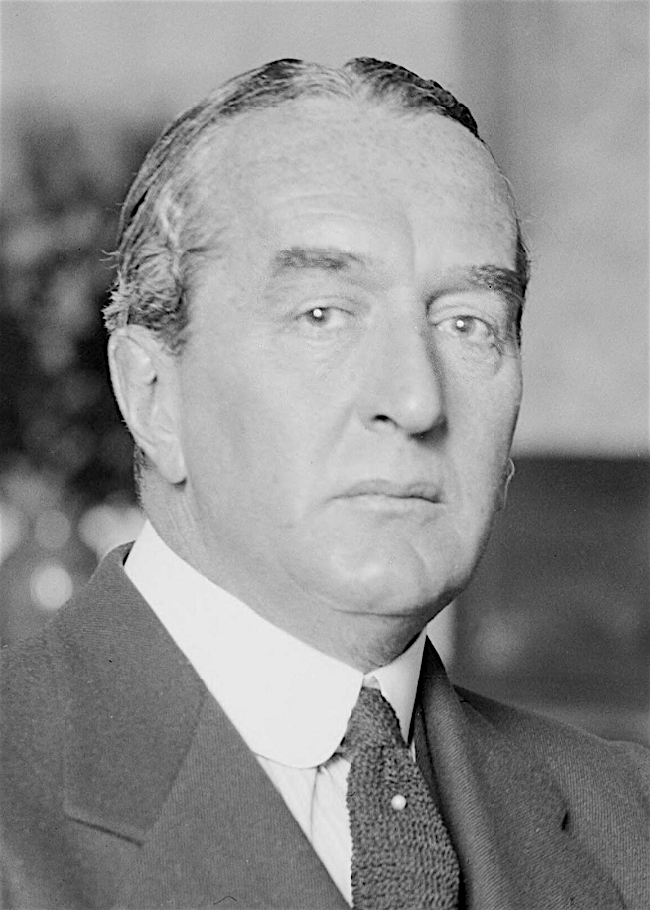
- Bruce in 1930

8th Prime Minister of Australia
- In office 9 February 1923 – 22 October 1929
- Monarch: George V
- Governors-General: Lord Forster; Lord Stonehaven
- Deputy: Earle Page
- Preceded by: Billy Hughes
- Succeeded by: James Scullin

Leader of the Nationalist Party
- In office 9 February 1923 – 22 October 1929
- Preceded by: Billy Hughes
- Succeeded by: John Latham

Treasurer of Australia
- In office 21 December 1921 – 8 February 1923
- Prime Minister: Billy Hughes
- Preceded by: Sir Joseph Cook
- Succeeded by: Earle Page

High Commissioner to the United Kingdom
- In office 7 September 1932 – 5 October 1945
- Preceded by: Granville Ryrie
- Succeeded by: Jack Beasley

Member of the Australian Parliament for Flinders
- In office 11 May 1918 – 12 October 1929
- Preceded by: William Irvine
- Succeeded by: Jack Holloway
- In office 19 December 1931 – 6 October 1933
- Preceded by: Jack Holloway
- Succeeded by: James Fairbairn

Member of the House of Lords Lord Temporal
- In office 18 March 1947 – 25 August 1967; Hereditary peerage

Personal details
- Born: Stanley Melbourne Bruce; 15 April 1883 St Kilda, Colony of Victoria
- Died: 25 August 1967 (aged 84) London, England
- Party: Nationalist (until 1931); United Australia (from 1931)
- Spouse: Ethel Anderson (m. 1913; died 1967)
- Parent: John Munro Bruce (father)
- Education: Trinity Hall, Cambridge
- Occupation: Commercial lawyer (Ashurst, Morris, Crisp & Co.)
- Profession: Barrister; businessman; politician

Military service
- Allegiance: United Kingdom
- Branch/service: British Army
- Years of service: 1914–1917
- Rank: Captain
- Unit: 2nd Battalion, Royal Fusiliers
- Battles/wars: World War I
- Awards: Military Cross; Croix de guerre (France)

Stanley Melbourne Bruce, 1st Viscount Bruce of Melbourne (15 April 1883 – 25 August 1967) was the eighth prime minister of Australia, serving from 1923 to 1929. He held office as the leader of the Nationalist Party, having previously served as the treasurer of Australia from 1921 to 1923.

Born into a briefly wealthy Melbourne family, Bruce studied at the University of Cambridge and played a leading role in his family's softgoods firm following the suicide of his father John Munro Bruce. He served on the front lines of the Gallipoli Campaign in World War I and returned to Australia wounded in 1917, becoming a spokesman for government recruitment efforts. He gained the attention of the Nationalist Party and prime minister Billy Hughes, who encouraged a political career. He was elected to the House of Representatives in 1918, becoming member of parliament (MP) for the seat of Flinders. He was appointed as treasurer in 1921, before replacing Hughes as prime minister in 1923. He established an anti-socialist coalition government with the agrarian Country Party, working closely with Country leader Earle Page in an arrangement that pioneered the modern Liberal–National coalition.

In office, Bruce pursued an energetic and diverse agenda. He comprehensively overhauled federal government administration and oversaw its transfer to the new capital city of Canberra. He implemented various reforms to the Australian federal system to strengthen the role of the Commonwealth, and helped develop the forerunners of the Australian Federal Police and the CSIRO. Bruce's "men, money and markets" scheme was an ambitious attempt to rapidly expand Australia's population and economic potential through massive government investment and closer ties with Great Britain and the rest of the British Empire. However, his endeavours to overhaul Australia's industrial relations system brought his government into frequent conflict with the labour movement, and his radical proposal to abolish the Commonwealth Court of Conciliation and Arbitration in 1929 prompted members of his own party into crossing the floor to defeat the government. In the resounding loss at the 1929 election, Bruce lost his own seat, making him the only sitting prime minister to lose his seat until John Howard's defeat at the 2007 election.

Although he returned to parliament in 1931, Bruce's service in the Lyons government was brief. Instead he pursued an international career, accepting appointment as High Commissioner to the United Kingdom in 1933. Bruce became an influential figure in British government circles and at the League of Nations, emerging as a tireless advocate for international co-operation on economic and social problems, especially those facing the developing world. Particularly passionate on improving global nutrition, Bruce was one of the key figures in the establishment of the Food and Agriculture Organization, serving as the first chairman of its governing council. He was the first Australian to sit in the House of Lords, as well as the first Chancellor of the Australian National University. Although his diplomatic career went largely unnoticed in Australia, he continued throughout his life in London to vociferously advocate for Australian interests (particularly during World War II) and asked that his remains be scattered over Canberra when he died.

== Early life ==
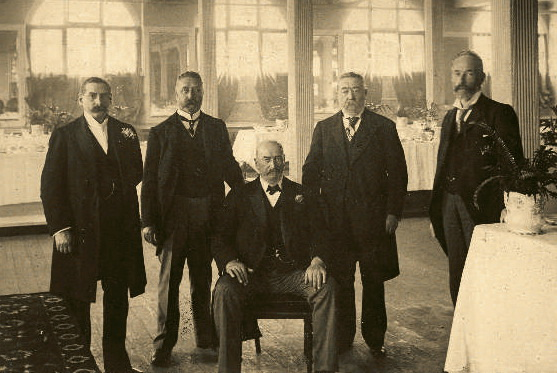
The firm of Paterson, Laing and Bruce, 1900. John Bruce sits at the centre.

Stanley Melbourne Bruce was born on 15 April 1883 in St Kilda, Victoria, a suburb of Melbourne, and was the youngest of five children. He disliked his given name and throughout his life preferred to be known by his initials "S.M.", even among close friends. His wife called him simply "S". When he became prime minister he issued a note to the press asking newspapers to use his initials and not his given name.

Bruce's father, John Munro Bruce, was born to Scottish parents in County Leitrim, Ireland, and had emigrated to Australia in 1858 at the age of 18. His mother, Mary Ann Henderson, was Irish and had married her cousin John after emigrating to Australia in 1872 at the age of 24. John Bruce became a talented businessman with "a flair for buying and selling", which would secure him a partnership in an established Melbourne importing firm that in 1868 became known as Paterson, Laing and Bruce. As his wealth grew, John Bruce became influential in colonial Victoria's social and political life. An avid golfer, he was one of the founders of the Royal Melbourne Golf Club. He was prominent in the liberal protectionist political movement within the state and an early supporter of future prime minister Alfred Deakin. John Bruce's success ensured that Stanley Bruce, his sister Mary and his brothers Ernest, William and Robert were born into affluence. Shortly after Stanley Bruce's birth the family relocated to the stately Wombalano manor, built by John Bruce, in Toorak. However, John Bruce was an aloof and remote figure in the lives of his children, as his son Stanley later recounted. Despite their family's Presbyterian background, Stanley Bruce was sent to Melbourne Church of England Grammar School (now Melbourne Grammar School) and subsequently Stanley Bruce would come to identify principally as Anglican. Bruce was an average student but extremely active in the sporting life of the school, captain of its Australian football team, and then of the school itself in 1901. Today, the school honours him with his own house, Bruce House, the colours of which are scarlet and white. The house's mascot is a lion, symbolising Bruce's bravery.

The economic depression of the 1880s and 1890s hit the Bruce family fortunes hard. John Bruce lost much of his fortune in the Victorian bank collapse of 1894 and incurred large debts to buy out his partners in the importing business in 1897. The family suffered a great deal more tragedy over the coming decades. Stanley's brother William committed suicide in 1899, shortly after seeking treatment for mental illness. Just two years later John Bruce took his own life during a business trip to Paris; he had suffered from depression as a result of the great pressures on his business and finances. His sister Mary endured a long illness before succumbing in 1908, and his mother died too in 1912. Finally, Bruce's beloved brother Ernest the recipient, like Stanley, of an MC for bravery, shot himself in 1919, suffering from physical and mental injuries sustained during his military service in World War I.

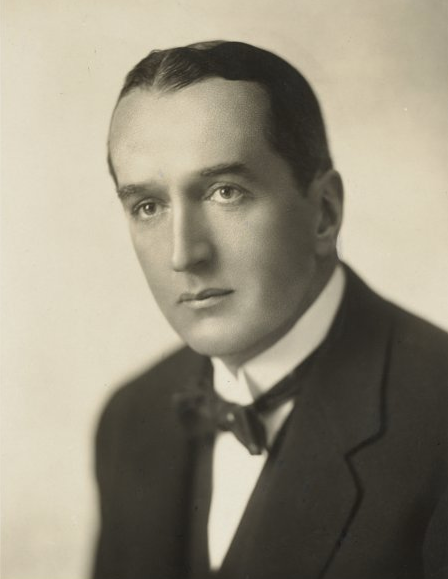
Bruce in the 1910s

In the aftermath of his father's death in 1901, the family fortunes were at a low ebb and Bruce went into the family business after leaving high school. The young Bruce was ambitious and determined to get an education. With loaned money, he moved to the United Kingdom with his mother and sister and enrolled in Trinity Hall, Cambridge in 1902. He was a popular if average student, heavily involved in the athletic life of the college, including as a member of the Cambridge rowing crew that won the Boat Race in 1904. Rowing remained one of his great passions, and he continued to coach crews (including several for the Henley Royal Regatta) and write on the subject for much of his life. Ernest Bruce had remained in Australia to take charge of the family's business interests. In 1906, he lobbied the directors of the company to have his brother Stanley take over the chairmanship of Paterson, Laing and Bruce, and was ultimately successful. Despite being just 23, he proved an able chairman, and with Stanley in London managing the exporting and financial interests, and Ernest managing the importation and sales operations in Melbourne, the financial fortunes of the business and the family rapidly recovered. During these years, Bruce also trained and worked as a solicitor and then as a barrister in the London with the firm of Ashurst, Morris, Crisp & Co. His work for the firm took him to Mexico in 1908 and Colombia in 1912, which fostered an interest in international affairs.

By 1912 Bruce was a businessman and a successful barrister, and it was in this year Ethel Dunlop Anderson travelled to England and was reacquainted with Bruce, whom she had known as a child. Aged 32, Ethel was of similar Scottish-Irish ancestry and hailed from a prominent squatter family of Victoria. She shared many of Bruce's interests, especially golf, and his political outlook. They married in July 1913 in a quiet ceremony. Theirs was a close-knit relationship – they would have many acquaintances but a small circle of close friends, and their relationship was one of mutual devotion. But the death of all but one member of his immediate family in just over a decade, and the fact that the Bruces would bear no children of their own, deeply affected Bruce. His brother Ernest's daughter, Helen Bruce, came to play a large part in his life and was to become the main beneficiary of his Will but Bruce "was left with a sense of insecurity and melancholy".

== Military service ==
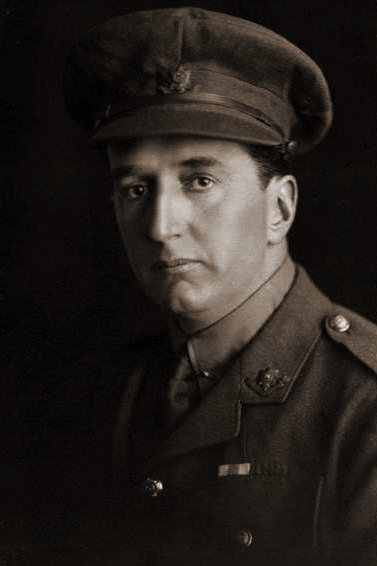
Captain Bruce of the Royal Fusiliers during World War I

Bruce returned briefly to Australia in 1914, swapping positions within the company with his brother Ernest. World War I broke out in August of that year. Bruce and his brothers sought to enlist in defence of the Empire, but all three of them would choose to serve in the British Army rather than the Australian Imperial Force. It was easier to obtain officer commissions in the British Army and the family had a close association with (and for many of them, long periods of residency in) Great Britain. Bruce enlisted and received a commission as a lieutenant on 7 February 1915 and was attached to the 2nd Battalion, Royal Fusiliers in Egypt, which was then assigned to the British 29th Division. The 29th subsequently joined operations in Turkey along with Australian and New Zealand Army Corps (ANZAC) troops that year under Sir Ian Hamilton, commander of the Mediterranean Expeditionary Force (MEF). First Lord of the Admiralty Winston Churchill had devised a strategy of capturing the Dardanelles from Turkey to allow naval access to Allied Russia. However allied naval forces were unable to secure passage through the narrow straits, and the MEF under Hamilton devised a plan to wrest control through amphibious landings. This was the beginning of the now infamous Gallipoli Campaign.

Bruce's regiment landed at Cape Helles in mid-1915, where he fully distinguished himself in the construction of trenches and as an able commander. His battalion suffered heavy casualties over the coming months, and Bruce himself was wounded on 3 June by a shot to the arm, though it was this injury that spared him from a major assault by his battalion on 4 June in which many of his peers perished. He later reflected that he must have been kept on earth for some purpose. He returned to the front lines and his division moved to the new front at Suvla Bay, where it was involved in particularly heavy fighting and sustained trench warfare throughout August and September. Bruce received the Military Cross and the Croix de Guerre for his service during these months, and rose to the rank of captain on 5 August. He was wounded again on 26 September, this time by a shot to the knee, which left him crippled for several years and forced him to return to England to recuperate, while the rest of his regiment were transferred to France after the abandonment of the Gallipoli campaign.

Although it had been the agreement before the war that Ernest would stay and manage Paterson, Laing and Bruce while his brothers were serving, Ernest Bruce decided to enlist in the British Army in 1915. Hence, in September 1916 Bruce sought to resign his commission and return to Australia to resume management of the family business. The War Office refused his request but granted him leave to return to Australia while recuperating from his injuries. As a decorated soldier on crutches with a gift for public speaking, he was enlisted to become a spokesperson for government recruitment in Australia. His success and popularity in this role brought the attention of the Nationalist League and then Prime Minister Billy Hughes, who lobbied the British government on his behalf and succeeded in convincing the War Office to allow Bruce to relinquish his commission in June 1917.

Having served with many of his countrymen he returned to Australia with a renewed sense of pride and mission in the country of his birth. But having borne witness to the catastrophic loss of life in the Gallipoli Campaign and the death of most of his army comrades, as well as having suffered through the loss of most of his family, at age 34 Bruce was imbued with "a driving ambition to make something of a life which providence had spared".

== Early years in politics ==
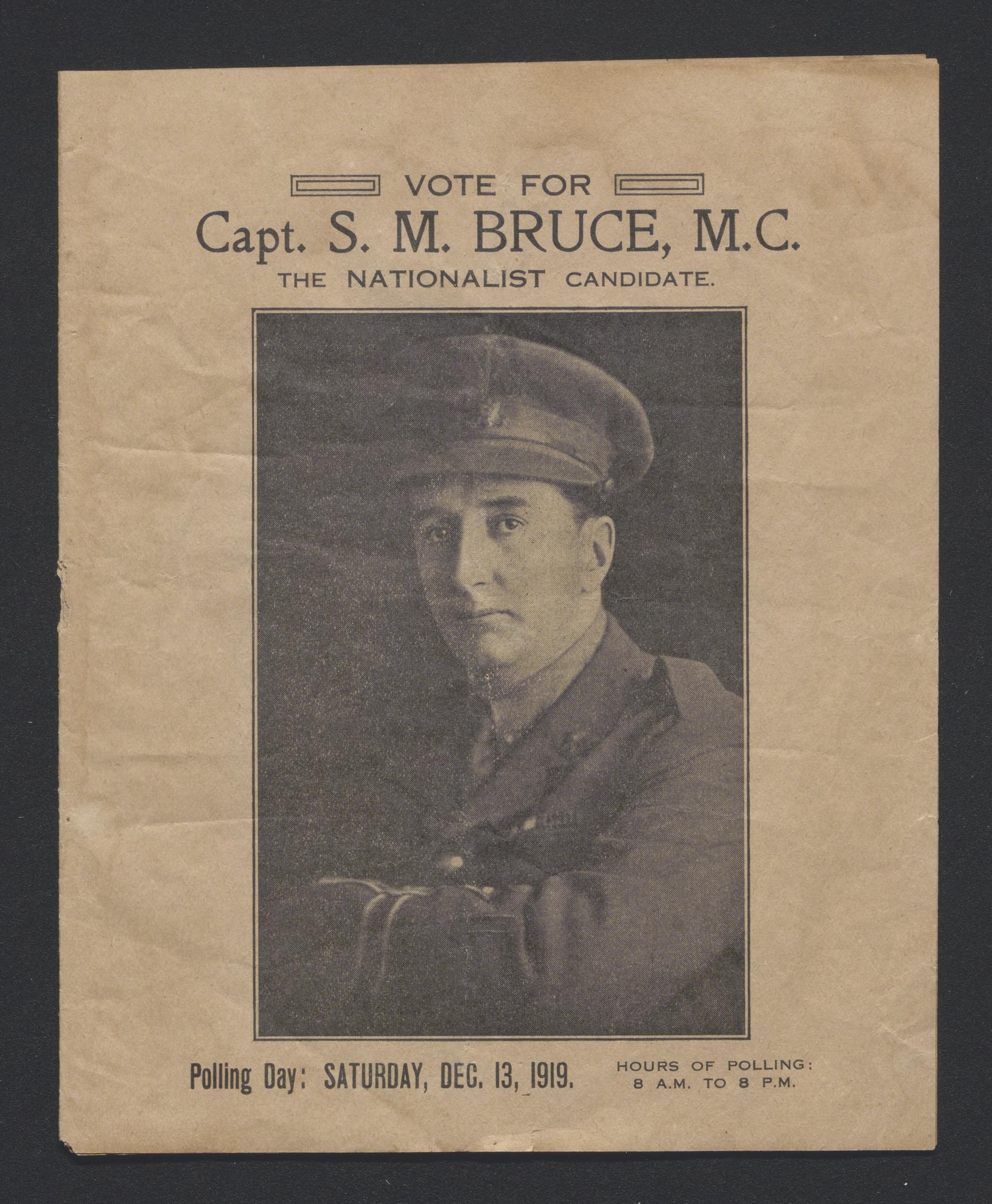
Poster for Bruce at the 1919 federal election

Bruce's popularity as a speaker for government recruitment efforts also earned him the attention of the National Union of Victoria, an influential group of Melbourne businessmen who provided much of the financing for the federal Nationalist Party. As Sir William Irvine had recently resigned from parliament to become Chief Justice of Victoria, there was to be a by-election for the Division of Flinders in 1918, which the National Union asked Bruce to stand for. The Nationalist preselection for the seat attracted many candidates, and Sir Edward Mitchell, one of Australia's leading constitutional lawyers, was presumed to be the front runner. Mitchell proved to be a disappointing speaker, and Bruce won preselection with the help of the National Union. A deal arranged by acting prime minister William Watt prevented the newly formed Country Party from challenging Bruce in what was a partly rural seat, stretching from Dandenong out into the rural areas south and east of Melbourne. In the by-election of 11 May, Bruce easily defeated his Labor opponent Gordon Holmes.

Speaking to the delegates in Dandenong, Bruce summed up his political philosophy:

A plain soldier and business man. I am no politician, nor have I any desire to be one. In the course of my commercial career it has been my fate to have had much experience of politicians and their ways. What I have seen in the course of that experience has given me little respect either for the professional politician or his methods. I am desirous of seeing this country governed in the ways of clear common sense and good sound business principles, and I think that desire of mine is heartily shared by the vast majority of the population.

Bruce's early years in parliament were unremarkable and his energies were primarily focused on the affairs of Paterson, Laing and Bruce. However, in 1921 he attracted the attention of his parliamentary colleagues over the matter of the Commonwealth Line. Nationalist Prime Minister Billy Hughes, now a peace-time leader, had declined in popularity within the party due to his left-wing domestic policies. The Commonwealth Line had been created by the Hughes government as a state-owned concern to ship Australian goods during World War I when British and domestic commercial shipping were unavailable. However its post-war existence was extensively criticised by Bruce as inappropriate and inefficient, and many of his economically conservative colleagues agreed. Bruce also distinguished himself as one of Australia's two representatives to the League of Nations in 1921 in Geneva, at which he passionately advocated for disarmament and greater international co-operation, despite his general scepticism with regards to the League's mission and potential for success.

=== Treasurer, 1921–1923 ===
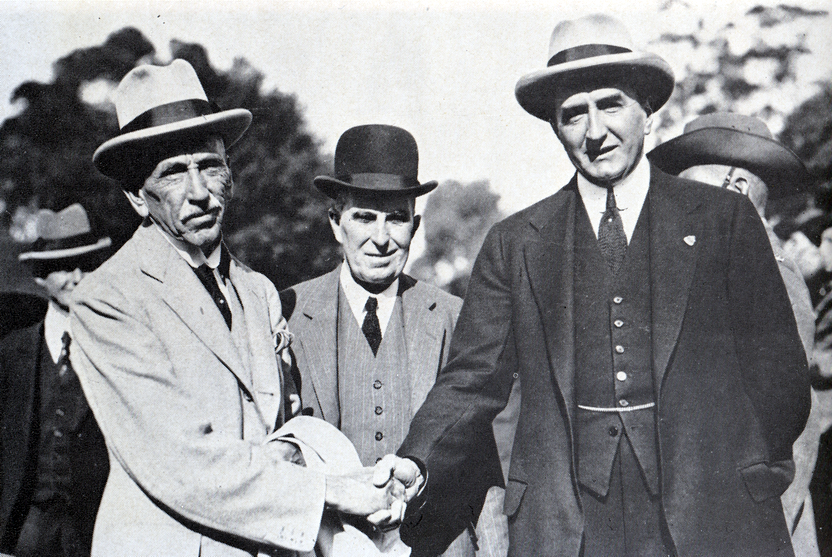
Billy Hughes, Herbert Pratten and Stanley Bruce

Returning from Europe in October 1921, he was invited by Prime Minister Billy Hughes to join his government as Minister for Trade and Customs. Bruce was not interested – he was the head of one of Australia's largest importing houses and thus had a serious conflict of interest with the portfolio, as well as being very busy running the affairs of that business. But he countered by stating that he might feel obliged to accept if the position of Treasurer was offered, knowing that it had already been promised to Walter Massy-Greene. To Bruce's surprise, Hughes agreed, although Massy-Greene was to remain the number two in the government and Minister for Defence. Bruce had only been in parliament for three years, yet his business background was highly desirable to Hughes, who was facing growing criticism from the pro-business figures of the party. These figures had become increasingly suspicious of Hughes and his interventionist approach to the economy. Influential party figures such as Senator George Pearce and the National Union had also identified Bruce as their preferred choice for the treasury.

Bruce and Hughes clashed in both style and ideology. Bruce found Hughes' management of the government capricious and chaotic, and felt that little was accomplished in Cabinet or in party meetings so long as Hughes headed them. But he was a strong counterweight to the domineering Hughes, resisting several of his more expensive proposals or acting as the voice of reason to talk Hughes down from several of his more outlandish ideas. His tenure would ultimately be short, presiding over just one budget in 1922, which was conservative and tax-cutting. The Opposition criticised the budget for its failure to limit rising government spending and indebtedness. The budget included many concessions to rural interests and the recently formed Country Party, which appeared as a major threat to Nationalist Party dominance going into the 1922 elections in December. Yet Bruce endeared himself to many of his colleagues with his amiable personal style, his forceful voice in Cabinet against Hughes, and his conservative views, which were more in line with the majority of the party.

== Prime Minister, 1923–1929 ==
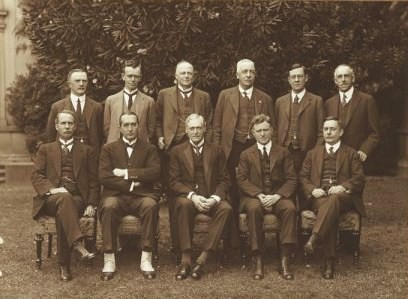
Bruce's newly assembled ministry, 1923

The Nationalists lost eleven seats and their majority in the Australian House of Representatives in the 1922 election. Only three of these seats were picked up by the Labor Party though, and Labor still lacked the numbers to form government in their own right. Rather, a breakaway anti-Hughes Liberal Party took five government seats, while the Country Party increased their number to 14 and now held the balance of power. The only politically realistic option for the Nationalists to stay in office was to come to an agreement with the Country Party. However, Country Party leader Earle Page refused to support a Nationalist government with Hughes as prime minister, and negotiations throughout January and February failed to break the impasse. Rather than risk being defeated in the legislature, which might have resulted in the Governor-General asking Labor to form government, Hughes surprised his colleagues by announcing his intention to resign on 2 February. With deputy leader Walter Massy-Greene having lost his seat at the 1922 election, Hughes now sent for Bruce to take over as leader of the party. After some reluctance, Bruce finally agreed, although Hughes later regretted the decision and became one of the new prime minister's most outspoken detractors.

Bruce moved quickly to secure a working majority for his government. He convinced Hughes' long time political ally George Pearce to join his ministry and shored up the support of the other former National Labor members of the Nationalist Party whom had walked out of the Labor Party with Hughes in 1916. He appointed William Watt as Speaker of the House, effectively removing one of his key opponents from the benches, a tactical manoeuvre that became common in Australian politics thereafter. But his most lasting political achievement was the negotiation of what became known as the Coalition – an arrangement of electoral and political co-operation between the Nationalists (and their successors) and the Country Party. Although differing greatly in character and background, the orderly and diplomatic Bruce forged a strong working relationship with the intelligent but irascible Country Party leader Page. Bruce had to pay a very high price for this relationship, however. As part of the Coalition agreement, the Country Party received five seats in a Cabinet of 11. Page also became Treasurer and ranked second in the Cabinet. The Nationalists also made major concessions on rural development and taxation policy – compromises that stirred some resentment among some members of Bruce's party. Page, who would serve as Treasurer and de facto Deputy Prime Minister throughout Bruce's tenure, would become a great admirer of Bruce, stating, "He was a leader who impressed his colleagues with his sincerity and his capacity, and earned their loyalty as the reward for his wisdom and integrity."

Bruce took office on 9 February, leading a conservative administration that would govern Australia for the next six years. His appointment as prime minister marked an important turning point in Australian political history. He was the first prime minister who had not been involved in the movement for Federation, who had not been a member of a colonial or state parliament, and who had not been a member of the original 1901 federal parliament. He was, in addition, the first prime minister to head a cabinet consisting entirely of Australian-born ministers. Yet Bruce himself was frequently caricatured in public as "an Englishman who happened to have been born in Australia". He drove a Rolls-Royce, wore white spats, and was often seen as distant and lacking the common touch: characteristics that did little to personally endear him to the Australian public.

=== "Men, money and markets" ===
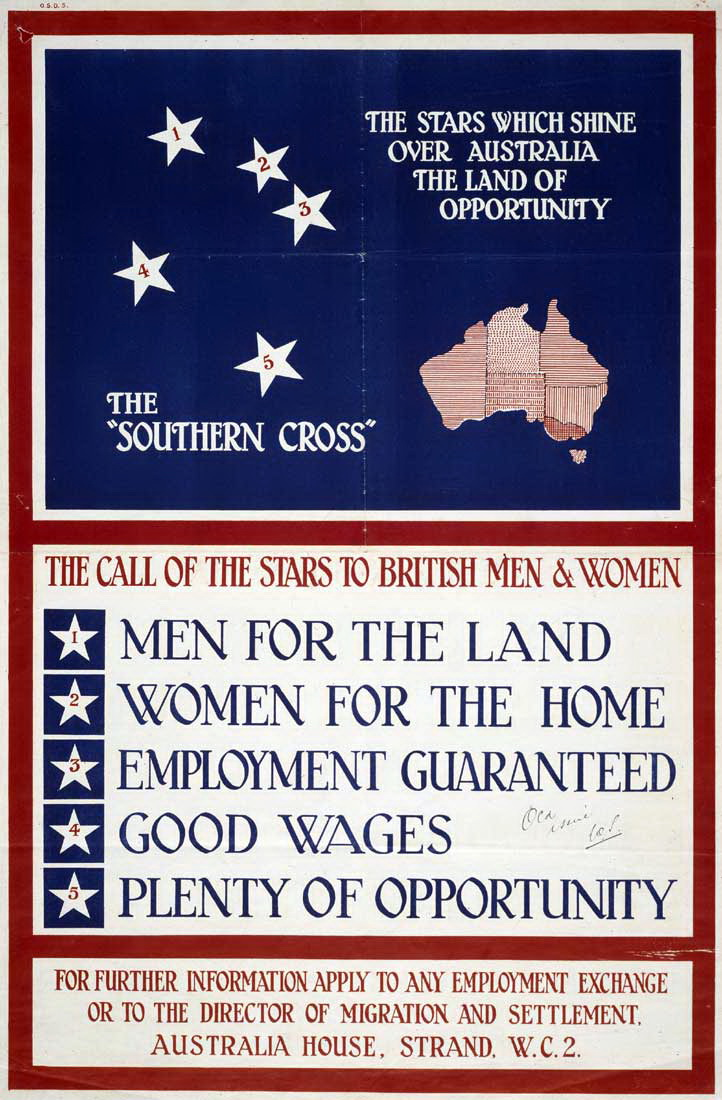
Poster promoting migration to Australia as part of the "men, money and markets" scheme, 1928

In 1923 Australia was prosperous by comparison with other developed nations of the period, having quickly rebounded economically after World War I. Unemployment and inflation were relatively low by international standards, and Commonwealth revenues had grown significantly since Australia became a federation. Australia was a vast and richly resourced country with fewer than six million inhabitants, and Bruce made it his government's priority to develop Australia's economy. In his first speech to the House of Representatives as prime minister, he outlined a comprehensive vision for Australia that centred on economic development, reform of the federal system, increased Commonwealth powers over industrial relations, a greater voice for Australia within the British Empire and the establishment of a national capital. He summarised this vision as a program of "men, money and markets".

According to Bruce, men were needed to allow Australia's extensive resources to be developed. In 1923, much of Australia's land was virtually unoccupied, and Bruce believed Australia had the potential to be one of the most fertile and productive nations in the world, which could sustain populations upward of 100 million over time – more than 16 times the population of his time. Despite dissenting voices from scientists, who noted that poor climate, soils and water availability were significant barriers to large populations, the Bruce-Page government enacted policies to encourage large numbers of British to migrate to Australia. Under the auspices of the new Development and Migration Commission, £34 million in loans took place over the decade starting in 1924 to facilitate immigrant settlement through improvements to rural infrastructure, land access, and subsidising immigrant journeys ("passages"). Estimates as high as half a million British immigrants over ten years were predicted at the start of the policy, whereas just over 200,000 travelled to Australia during that time period. Bruce's settlement plan rested on rural growth. Migrants were often selected on the basis of their willingness to work on the land; state and Commonwealth governments concentrated their investment on rural development and encouraged returned servicemen to take up farms on the periphery of settled areas. Despite this, a majority of these migrants settled in urban areas, as Australia's rural areas were far more remote and difficult to work (than for example England's) and many of those taking advantage of the assistance scheme were urban workers or family and friends of those already settled.

Immigration from outside Great Britain and her dominions was considered unpalatable – the Bruce government upheld the White Australia policy by placing strong restrictions on immigration from other areas, notwithstanding its population growth targets. In his campaign speech for the 1925 election, Bruce stated:

It is necessary that we should determine what are the ideals towards which every Australian would desire to strive. I think those ideals might well be stated as being to secure our national safety, and to ensure the maintenance of our White Australia Policy to continue as an integral portion of the British Empire. We intend to keep this country white and not allow its people to be faced with the problems that at present are practically insoluble in many parts of the world.

Money was borrowed from Britain to fund the state's programs and at an unprecedented rate. Over £230 million was extended in loans from the City of London to state and Commonwealth treasuries during the 1920s. A further £140 million arrived through private investment. Bruce's plan for Australian economic development needed a much stronger role for the Commonwealth government than had been traditionally accepted. Both he and Page were "conspicuously national rather than federal in their outlook" and sought major changes to federal-state relations in order implement their development policy.

Increasingly our problems are becoming national in character ... Our financial resources are curtailed and there is an immediate repercussion throughout the Commonwealth. All our problems are common problems. None can be prosperous unless all are prospering. I am more convinced that we have to look at all our problems with the eyes of a nation and not as individuals. Where a great problem confronts a State it may be solved by the co-operation of the Commonwealth for the benefit of the States, and the benefit and advancement of the whole of Australia.

The Bruce–Page plan of May 1923 put in motion efforts to coordinate state-federal operations in several areas, particularly infrastructure and rural development schemes. The Main Roads Development Act of 1923 was one of the first and most important legislative accomplishments in this vein. The act leveraged Section 96 of the Constitution of Australia to grant financial assistance to the states by employing it to fund road construction and maintenance according to the plans of the federal transportation portfolio – in effect allowing the Commonwealth to operate directly in what was constitutionality the exclusive domain of the state governments. The Act would provide a precedent for many types of "special purpose payments" that became a common feature of Australian federal fiscal relations. Despite some major successes, Bruce was more frequently frustrated by a lack of progress in many key areas of intergovernmental co-operation. The states could not be induced to standardise electrical power schemes, nor unify on track gauges, nor national health insurance despite years of work and solid arguments in favour. Bruce was appointed a Privy Counsellor in the 1923 Birthday Honours.

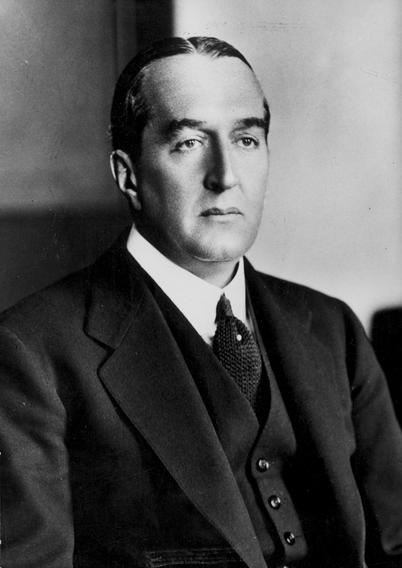
Bruce in about 1925

Although men and money had been secured, the markets component of the Bruce plan was never fully realised. At the 1923 Imperial Conference, Bruce lobbied consistently for the Conservative government of Stanley Baldwin to make changes to Great Britain's trading arrangements to give preference to dominion products over imports from other nations. He argued for Empire-wide economic trading arrangements that filled domestic demands by production from member states before seeking supplemental imports from other countries and empires. Baldwin and the Conservatives attempted to introduce such a scheme in Britain; however, the British public feared higher prices for basic products (particularly food), and this fear was a factor in the Conservative government's defeat in the December 1923 election. Baldwin's successor Ramsay MacDonald repudiated the plan, much to Bruce's chagrin, and attempts to revive negotiations foundered as economic conditions worsened throughout the decade. World agricultural prices stalled in the mid-1920s as European and American agricultural production recovered to pre-war levels, and Australian exports were crowded out of markets as the decade progressed.

In 1927, Earle Page handed down the first budget in deficit for the coalition government, and Bruce recognised that Australia's economic position was deteriorating. Federal and state debt that year totalled just over £1 billion, of which £305 million were war debts and the rest had been spent on development that had failed had deliver high returns. Nearly half of the total debt was owed to overseas lenders, principally those in London. Economic growth was slow, and far lower than the levels hoped. Exports and revenues were falling behind government needs, and investors had begun to express alarm at Australia's level of debt. Bruce persisted with his plans and believed that growing Australian exports were the key to rectifying the problems, thus justifying further investment and encouragement of population growth. The government did act to try to manage the debt problem. By the mid-1920s, states were borrowing at unsustainable rates to fund their own programs to compensate for dwindling revenues. In response, Bruce proposed that the responsibility for all government debts, Commonwealth and state, and the authority to acquire new debt, should be handed over to a National Loan Council in which all states would have one vote and the Commonwealth would have two votes and the casting vote. He also moved to abolish per capita payments to the states, to be replaced by a funding formula tied more to financial need. These two changes formed the Financial Agreement of 1927, the provisions of which were approved by referendum in 1928. These changes would prove to be amongst the most significant in Australian constitutional history, as the states had now lost much of their financial independence. Faced with severe financial pressures and an increasing reliance upon Commonwealth transfer payments, after some resistance the states consented, although vertical fiscal imbalance between the states and the Commonwealth continued to be an enduring feature of Australian federal relations.

=== Modernising government ===
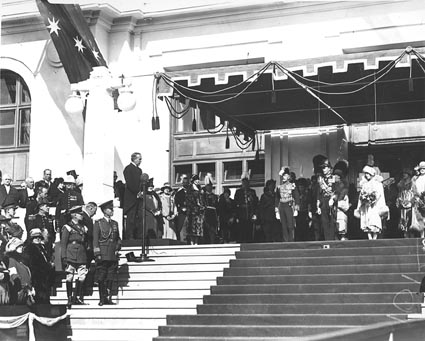
Bruce speaking at the opening of Parliament House, Canberra on 9 May 1927

Bruce set about applying his business principles to his cabinet, putting his experience as both a corporate manager and rowing coach to use in a cabinet system that was orderly and practical. He implemented a formal system whereby a proper agenda for cabinet meetings would be formulated, and the minister responsible for each item would circulate papers to bring other members up to speed on the issue. His decision-making procedures ensured that his colleagues were informed and actively participated in decisions – or if they disagreed, gave leave for cabinet members to absent themselves from meetings to preserve cabinet solidarity. In this respect Bruce earned the quick respect and approval of his colleagues, and in many respects came to dominate cabinet through his industriousness and knowledgability. Cabinet minister George Pearce would later conclude that Bruce was the best of the prime ministers that he served or opposed in his 38-year parliamentary career.

Bruce also greatly strengthened the research and information-gathering capacity of the executive, and sought to make decisions and policy on the basis of the best available evidence and information. A record 22 Royal Commissions reported to the Bruce government, as well as scores of other inquiries and research projects undertaken by the Commonwealth in a wide range of areas, particularly on economic, industrial and agricultural matters. Recognising that investment in science was essential to expanding the opportunities for agricultural and economic development in Australia, Bruce established the Council for Scientific and Industrial Research (CSIR), now known as the CSIRO. He established the Bureau of Economic Research in 1929 and for the first time economists were regularly employed to advise the government on what had been until then exclusively political issues. By the time he left office, he had put in place extensive structures to provide information to the prime minister and the executive branch on most major areas of policy, a major development in the professional capacity of the Australian prime minister.

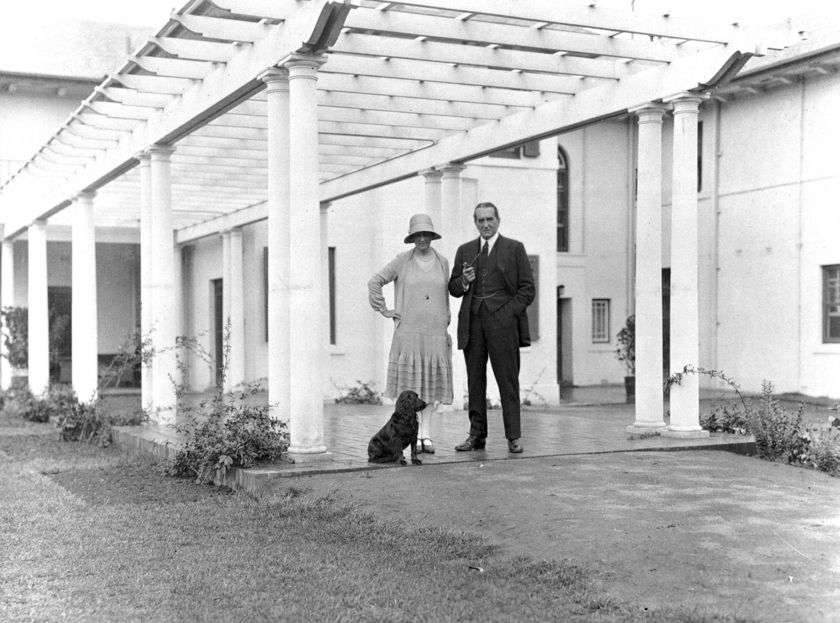
Stanley and Ethel Bruce after moving into The Lodge, 1926

Under Bruce the Australian government also moved to its new permanent home in the planned federal city of Canberra. Plans for a new federal capital had been circulated since the time of Federation, and a site on the Molonglo River was selected in 1913. Design and construction had proceeded slowly due to World War I as well as funding and management problems. Bruce was a committed advocate of the new capital, however, stating: "For the purposes of Federation it was essential that there should be some central point of nationhood, suitable to Australia as a nation ... and sooner or later there would have to be a national capital, overriding State boundaries and State prejudices." This came to pass on 9 May 1927 when the Federal Parliament moved to its new premises in Canberra; Bruce had moved himself and his wife to The Lodge a few days earlier. At the Federal Parliament's opening ceremony, Bruce decided that voices of the clerks of the House of Representatives and the Senate were too heavily accented, and determined that he would personally welcome the Duke of York and co-open the new building – a move that was criticised by several parliamentarians. The business of transferring government and cabinet operations to the new capital proceeded slowly over 1927 and 1928. This was an administrative task that occupied a significant proportion of the government's time in those years, with many departments only very gradually transferring from Melbourne, much to Bruce's consternation.

=== Imperial overtures ===
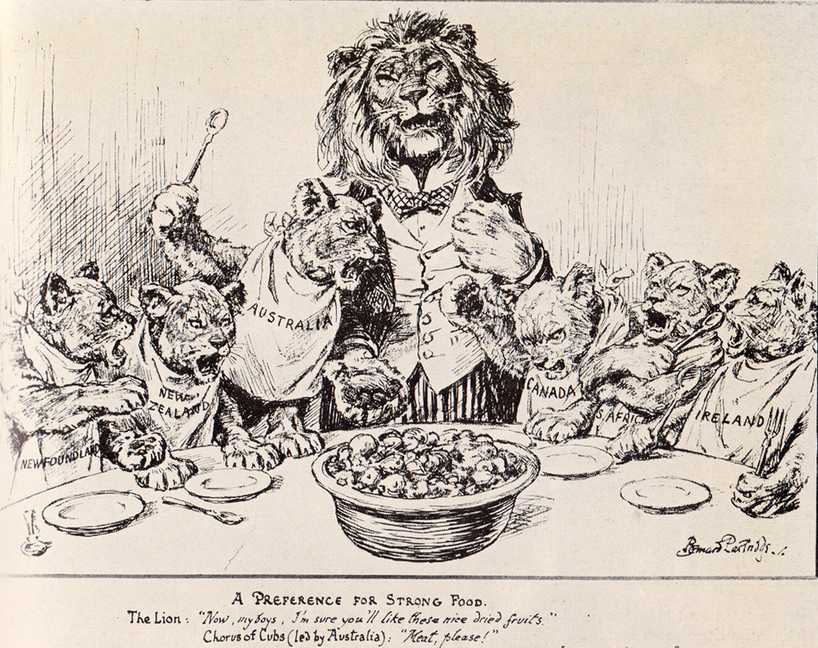
Much coverage was given to the stand taken by Bruce at the 1923 Imperial Conference.

Loyal to the concept of the British Empire, Bruce envisaged strengthening it through mutual economic development, greater political co-operation, and common policies on defence, trade and foreign affairs. His first trip abroad as prime minister was for the 1923 Imperial Conference in London. Bruce put forward a wide range of proposals for stronger co-operation between Great Britain and her dominions in a wide range of areas, particularly in the areas of trade, defence and the formulation of a common foreign policy. He particularly desired a greater role for the dominions in imperial affairs, including a collective decision-making body for common questions of defence and foreign affairs. He took exception to a lack of involvement in foreign policy decisions made by Britain that would have significant ramifications for Australia. In 1922, in what became known as the Chanak Crisis, British brinkmanship over Turkey's aggressive manoeuvres to redefine its border with Greece had escalated to the point where the British cabinet had threatened war against Turkey. This threat included military participation of dominions in an intervention, though no dominion government had been informed of the developments in Turkey. Although a diplomatic end to the crisis was eventually found, dominion leaders were angered at having almost been committed to a military conflict without any consultation.

Bruce pushed for greater consultation and voice for the dominions, and succeeded in having Richard Casey appointed as a permanent political liaison in London who would have access to British government decisions and act as a conduit between Westminster and Melbourne. He also successfully lobbied for the creation of a Dominion Office separated out from the Colonial Office to acknowledge the different state of affairs that now existed in the Empire. However, while fellow dominions generally agreed that the imperial system should be modified, not all shared his vision for closer collaboration and strong ties. Canada and the Union of South Africa were instead seeking greater independence from London, and there was little enthusiasm for many of Bruce's more ambitious plans for inter-empire trade and policy co-operation.

Despite Australia's greater representation in London after 1923, Bruce's hope for collective imperial decision-making was dashed once more with the British decision to recognise the Soviet Union in 1924. This act dismayed the fervently anti-communist Bruce, who disagreed with the decision ideologically and on the grounds that once again the dominions had not been consulted. Ultimately, though, the differences between Britain's and her dominions' opinions on the matter were too great to be reconciled. Instead, Britain signed the General Treaty with the Soviet Union only on her own behalf, marking the first major split between Britain and Australia on a matter of foreign policy. Despite its applicability solely to European security arrangements, Bruce had criticised Britain's signing of the Locarno Treaties in 1925 without dominion consultation; though the eventual treaty was not binding on the dominions.

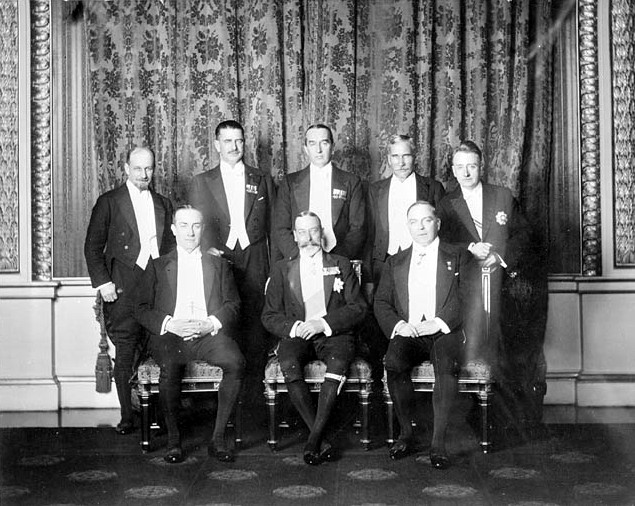
Bruce (Back row centre) at the 1926 Imperial Conference

The 1926 Imperial Conference confirmed that Britain and her dominions were rapidly diverging in interests and that greater independence – not greater co-operation – was the most practical solution. Bruce recognised the empire had reached a turning point, but despite his optimism for a reinvigorated imperial system, there was little interest from other governments. His plan for greater economic and defensive co-operation was discussed, as well as a revival of imperial preference in trading arrangements, but such ideas were now politically unpalatable in Britain and failed to develop. His attitudes were almost the opposite of those held by the leaders of Canada, South Africa and the Irish Free State. As Prime Minister Baldwin remarked at the conference, "If you, Mr Bruce, would use the word 'Empire' a bit less and you Mr McGilligan would use it a bit more, then we would make better progress." Ultimately proposals for greater independence won out, and 1926 Imperial Conference recognised through the Balfour Declaration that dominions were essentially independent entities that freely associated as the British Commonwealth of Nations, though after much negotiation it stopped short of using the terms nation or state. Governors-General were redefined as representatives only of the British monarch, not the British government, and were obliged now to act only on the advice of their respective dominion governments. These changes were both symbolically and practically significant in the transformation of the dominions from colonies to independent nations. Bruce had mixed feelings about these developments; on the one hand he believed that the Empire was still a strong and vital international organisation playing a positive role in international affairs, but on the other hand he was disappointed that other member nations did not share his vision or commitment to maintaining its integrity and unity. Bruce did have some successes at the conference, however, expanding the work of the Imperial Economic Committee and increasing inter-empire co-operation in technical and scientific areas.

=== Industrial relations ===
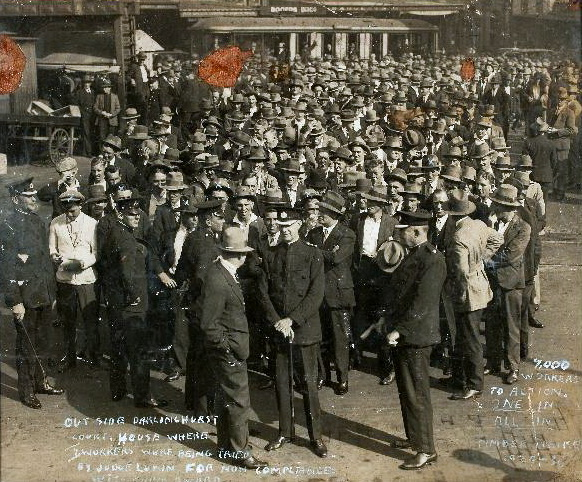
Workers protesting against the decisions of the Commonwealth Court of Conciliation and Arbitration during the 1929 Timber Workers strike

Strikes and industrial unrest were frequent in the aftermath of World War I, arising from discontent over poor conditions and the rise of militant labour organisations like the Communist Party of Australia and the Industrial Workers of the World. The problems were made worse in Australia due to the overlapping system of industrial courts that had evolved since Federation. Although federal arbitration was intended for industrial disputes that impacted upon multiple states or federal employees, courts had through several judgments greatly expanded the potential jurisdiction of federal arbitration, and the system had developed into a duality with both state and federal tribunals weighing into a wide range of industrial disputes. This was exploited by both unions and employers, who pursued matters in the courts they felt most likely to be favourable and switched between different jurisdictions to arrive at the best combination of state and federal conditions. Protracted disputes arose as employers and employees pursued disputes in different courts or refused to recognise the rulings of one in favour of the other. Billy Hughes and several of his predecessors had sought resolution to the problem through greater Commonwealth powers, but all referendums to expand Commonwealth industrial powers had failed at the ballot box.

Bruce's attitudes towards industrial relations were varied, and he was initially unsympathetic to either employer or employee complaints, believing the best resolutions to be those brokered between businesses and their employees. He frequently called upon both sides to embrace a spirit of co-operation. The situation became acute when waterfront workers led by the Seamen's Union went on strike in 1925. This had severe and immediate effect on the Australian economy, reliant as it was on sea transportation for its imports and exports, a situation the Prime Minister recognised as untenable. With the union disregarding Commonwealth rulings on the dispute, Bruce rushed through the Navigation Act and the Immigration Act. The first allowed British and foreign shipping not working under Australian industrial awards to operate in Australian waters (although British vessels working in Australia would soon initiate a strike of their own). The second allowed the Commonwealth to deport any foreign-born person whom a special tribunal found guilty of "disrupting the industrial life of the community". Key foreign-born strike leaders were immediately targeted for deportation, but New South Wales Premier Jack Lang refused to allow state police to serve summonses on two leading union leaders. Bruce responded with the Peace Officers Act, which re-established a Commonwealth police force.

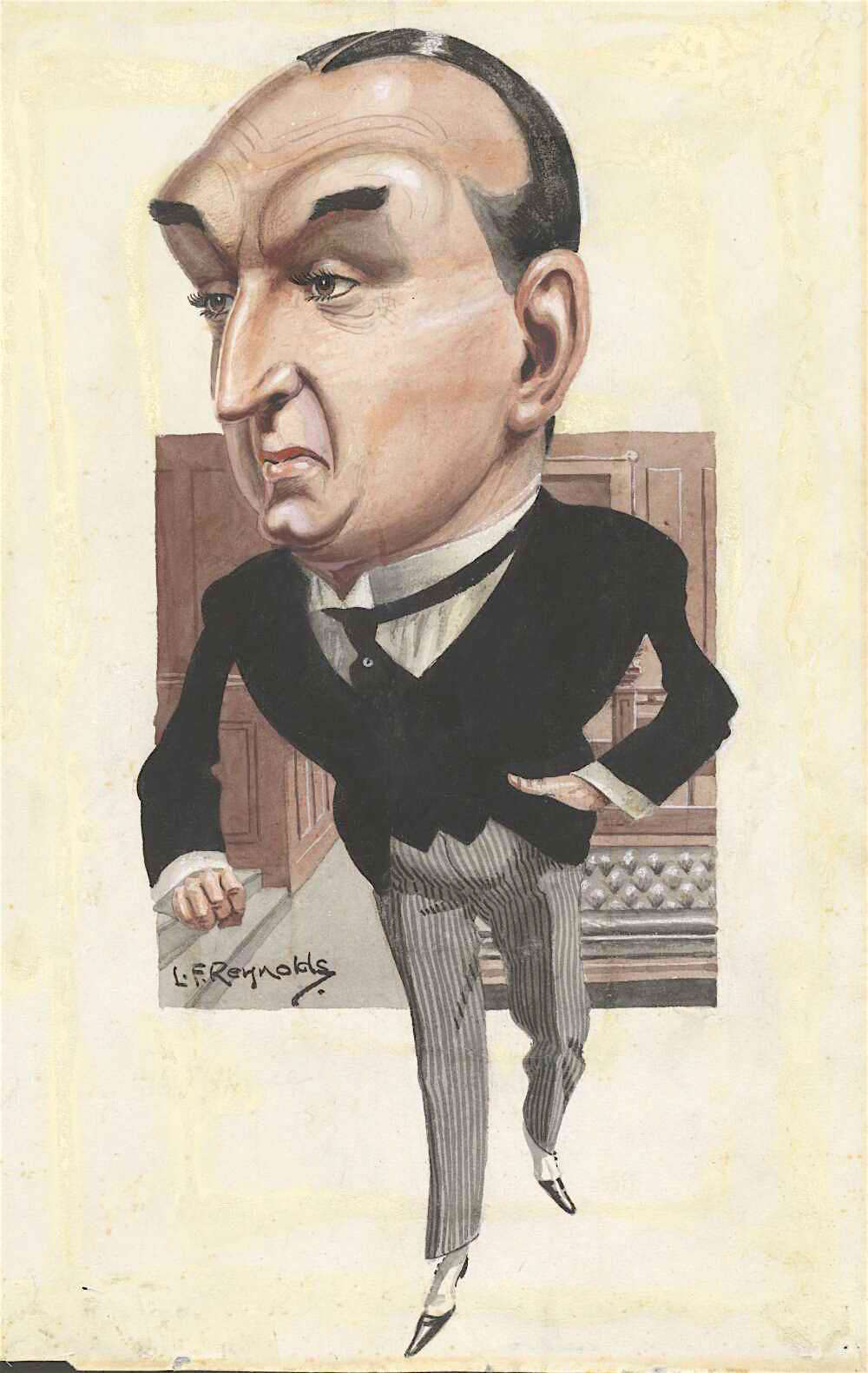
Caricature of Bruce as prime minister

These heavy-handed tactics drew outrage from the Labor Party, which challenged the Prime Minister to seek approval from the people. This Bruce did, and the elections of 1925 were Australia's first "red scare" election. He campaigned for industrial peace and an increased Commonwealth role in securing it, but also denounced "foreign agitators" and "class war" in appealing for law and order on the waterfront. He openly challenged pre-existing federal arrangements, stating on the campaign trail that Australia "should now consider whether that great historic instrument, the Constitution, meets the needs of to-day in the light of the developments which have taken place". The campaign was a success and the Bruce government was easily re-elected, increasing by 11 seats its majority over a disheartened ALP, whose leader Matthew Charlton was in poor health.

"My government was returned to power on a clear issue and with a definite mission ... to introduce measures for the preservation of industrial peace", Bruce declared during his second term, and called a referendum to amend the Australian Constitution and bring industrial relations under the exclusive jurisdiction of the Commonwealth. Attempts to amend the constitution for this purpose had been rejected narrowly in 1911, 1913 and 1919, but against a background of ongoing industrial strife, Bruce made clear the problems of mixed jurisdiction, confusing dual-awards, and insufficient regulatory and enforcement powers at the Commonwealth level. Controversially, he also formulated an "essential services" question to be put at the same time, giving the government the power to protect the public from any "actual or probable disruption to essential services". These proposals drew hostile reception from many quarters – even from future conservative prime minister Robert Menzies – and both the Australian Labor Party and conservative groups were divided in opinion on the amendments, with the ALP eventually taking no fixed position on the questions. But by September the issue had drawn so much controversy and ill-feeling that it was no surprise for many commentators that the proposals failed to attract sufficient popular support to overcome the high bar for constitutional change.

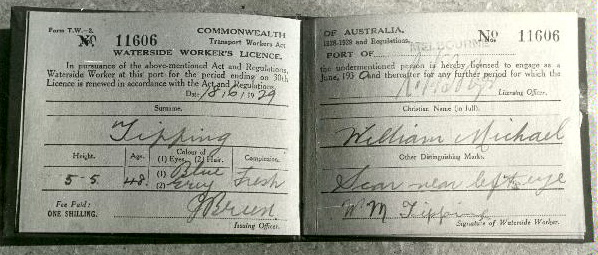
A license or 'dog collar' issued to a waterfront worker under the Transport Workers Act in 1929

The problems of industrial unrest continued to flare up, and the waterfront remained a flashpoint. In a review of the Commonwealth Conciliation and Arbitration Act in 1928, Bruce required industrial courts to consider the economic effects of its awards in addition to the welfare of worker. Immediate problems followed when a new award for waterside workers in 1928 worsened conditions for workers on economic grounds. New industrial action led by the Waterside Workers Federation broke out. In Melbourne these turned to riots, claiming casualties and at least one fatality. Reviving the "red scare" pitch for the 1928 election campaign, Bruce pushed the Transport Workers Act through parliament in response, which gave the executive unprecedented regulatory power in industrial relations. All waterfront workers now required federal licenses, or "dog collars" as they were derisively known, to work. The act allowed the Commonwealth government to effectively control who worked on the docks and nearly destroyed the Waterside Workers Federation, earning the government deep unpopularity among organised labour.

At the 1928 election Bruce's government was returned to power, but it now had a majority of just nine – a fragile result, given the growing propensity for Nationalist member defections. Most of the Nationalists' parliamentary gains from 1925 had been wiped out. James Scullin had assumed the leadership of the ALP earlier in the year, upon the retirement of Charlton, and the party was invigorated as a consequence. Bruce was undeterred, though, and became convinced that unless costs of production for industry in Australia could be lowered and industrial peace secured, Australia was heading towards a major economic crisis. This doctrine was the basis of his appeals to the public for the next year and a half.

=== Maritime industries crisis ===
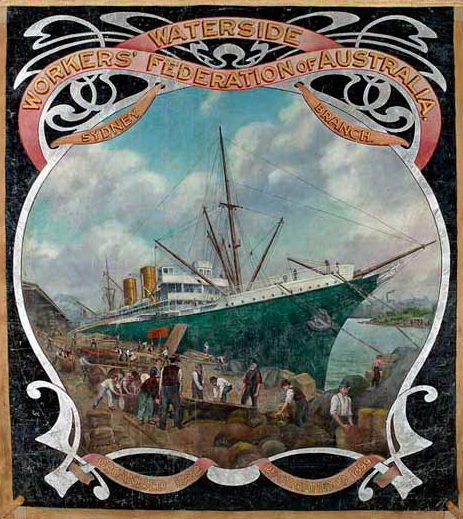
The Waterfront Workers Federation was highly militant during the 1920s. Much of Bruce's industrial legislation was targeted at curbing the organisation's power.

As early as 1927 economic indicators were signalling the onset of a recession in Australia. By 1929, the evidence was unavoidable that recession was becoming depression as a resulting of rapidly deteriorating international conditions. In that year, prices for Australian exports fell by nearly a third and GDP had fallen by 10%, with no attendant fall in the cost of living. Australia's debt now stood at £631 million – the interest payments on which were equivalent to nearly half of Australia's export receipts, a situation difficult to sustain even in a positive economic climate. Investors and banks recognised the risk and Australia's credit access was rapidly drying up. Bruce's grand economic development plans had increased the national debt significantly yet had delivered only marginal economic expansion in the short term.

To make matters worse for the government, industrial unrest was a persisting problem, particularly in the economically key states of New South Wales and Victoria. The opposition had become more potent as well: Scullin was widely recognised as one of the parliament's most gifted and articulate members; even his opponents respected his personal probity. Scullin forecast that the Australian economy was highly vulnerable given its indebtedness, and was on a course for severe depression if government finances were not turned around dramatically.

Furthermore, the Prime Minister's own party was breaking down underneath him. There had been no official party platform yet agreed to, and individual members had a wide degree of latitude to determine the issues they ran on, leading to frequent government defections on legislation. The government's existing nine-seat majority shrank during 1928 and 1929 over various issues, as a result of by-elections, and several leading figures who had previously worked with Bruce became increasingly sharp critics of him. Hughes and Edward Mann were two of the government's most ardent opponents in 1929.

Worsening economic conditions had put further pressure on industrial relations, with unemployment rising and employers seeking to cut costs. Strikes of sugar mill workers in 1927, waterside workers in 1928, and then transport and timber industry workers in 1929 continued to disrupt economic operations. The worst came with ongoing disputes between miners and mine owners on the coalfields of New South Wales had culminated in riots and lockouts in 1929, and intervention by the Bruce government failed to produce a settlement. Notably, in March 1929 Newcastle-based mine owner John Brown locked out workers from his mines at Pelaw Main and Richmond Main to try to force acceptance of lower wages. Attorney-General John Latham pursued legal action against Brown for illegally using coercive industrial tactics, but Bruce intervened to stop the prosecution, believing the case to be doubtful and that dropping it would give the government a chance to negotiate an end to the dispute. The mine-owners refused to accede to government-brokered negotiations anyway, and the government was seen to have been siding with rich businesses and applying double standards, undermining Bruce's own credibility as an impartial leader and law-and-order prime minister.

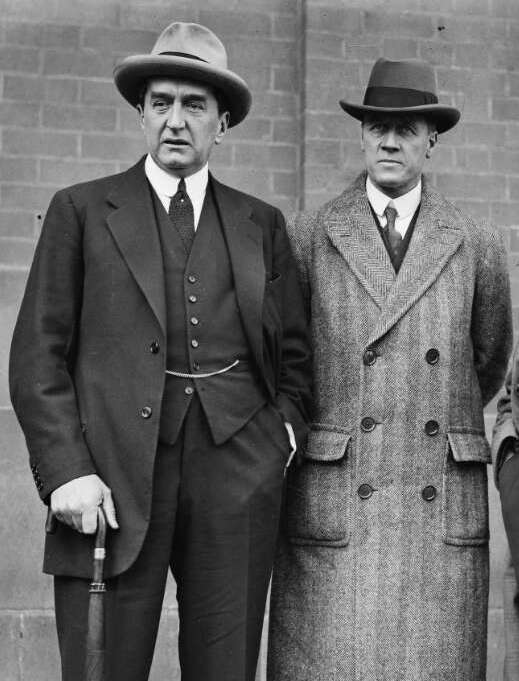
Bruce with John Latham, his Attorney-General and eventual successor as leader of the Nationalist Party

Bruce and the conservatives in parliament became increasingly convinced that "economic deterioration [was] the product, rather than the possible cause, of worsening industrial relations." Exasperated, the Prime Minister made a dramatic move and presented an ultimatum to the Australian state governments: either they should voluntarily hand their powers of industrial regulation to the federal government, or the federal government would divest itself of its industrial powers and dismantle federal arbitration. The announcement came as a major shock to all sides of politics, not least the members of Bruce's own cabinet, most of whom had not been informed of the dramatic change in policy until the day it was announced to the states. Bruce calculated that the states would not give up their powers, and thus the move was one designed to sanction the end of Commonwealth arbitration. For Bruce, the only inconceivable outcome now was that the status quo of dual jurisdiction remained unchanged. The opposition to the proposal, which the Prime Minister introduced to the parliament as the Maritime Industries Bill, was swift and fierce. In 1929 over 150 unions and 700,000 workers were covered by Commonwealth awards over a wide range of industries – although there was dissatisfaction in the coal and timber sectors, most were happy with their arrangements and feared worse pay and conditions if moved back to state awards. He defended his actions as being necessary to create certainty and end the duplication that had caused so many problems in recent years.

Other government decisions in 1929 had attracted controversy as well. Page handed down his last budget on 22 August, which hinted at the burgeoning debt crisis and introduced a new tax on entertainment and theatres to help cover the deficit. The tax was very unpopular with the public, and the entertainment industry mounted a vocal campaign to stop it. Bruce, supported by the Brigden Report of 1929, also raised concern that protective tariffs were too high and were in need of reform – a position controversial with the powerful protected industries.

The second reading of the Maritime Industries Bill passed by only four votes, with Hughes, Edward Mann and George Maxwell voting against the government. Hughes moved an amendment to the bill that stipulated it should only take effect after being approved by the people at a referendum or general election. Bruce ruled out any referendum, stating that the amendment would constitute a vote of confidence in his government and urged his party to vote it down. Nationalist MP Walter Marks and Independent MP William McWilliams joined the opposition, giving the opposition a one-vote majority. Bruce and his supporters now lobbied the Speaker, Sir Littleton Groom to make a deliberative vote in committee to tie the numbers, leaving the Committee chairman James Bayley with the casting (and presumably pro-government) vote. Groom refused, citing long-standing Westminster (though not Australian) parliamentary tradition of the speaker's impartiality. Groom's bitterness at having been dismissed by Bruce from the job of Attorney-General in 1925 had a significant bearing on his later decision.

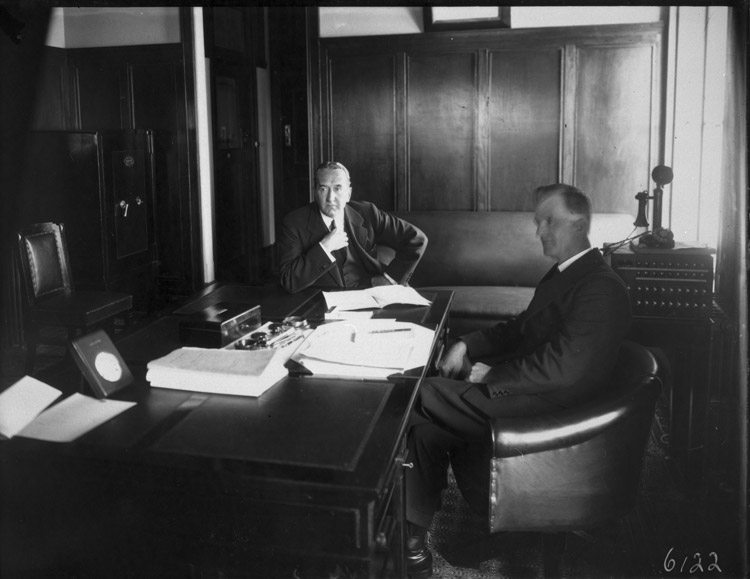
Bruce meeting with Prime Minister-elect Scullin a day before Scullin's swearing in

A snap election was called, with Bruce taking his case to the people that dramatic action on industrial relations was needed. Opposition Leader Scullin forcefully attacked the government, blaming the Prime Minister for an industrial environment that was adversarial and punitive, stressing that Commonwealth arbitration had safeguarded many rights of workers and was completely workable with conciliation and proper consultation. Scullin also criticised the government for the growing debt problem and economic malaise, which for some years he had predicted would lead to a major economic crisis.

In the event, the government was soundly defeated on 12 October, losing more than half its seats in parliament. To add to his humiliation, Bruce was defeated in his own seat of Flinders by Labor challenger Jack Holloway. On paper, there was no indication that Bruce was in any danger of losing his seat; he held Flinders with a reasonably safe majority of 10.7 percent in 1928. However, on the second count Holloway picked up enough preferences from an independent Liberal candidate to give him the victory. Bruce was the first sitting prime minister to lose his own seat, a feat which would not be repeated until 2007. He was measured in defeat however, stating, "The people have said they do not want my services, and I am going into the banishment to which they have sent me."

== Return to cabinet, 1931–1933 ==
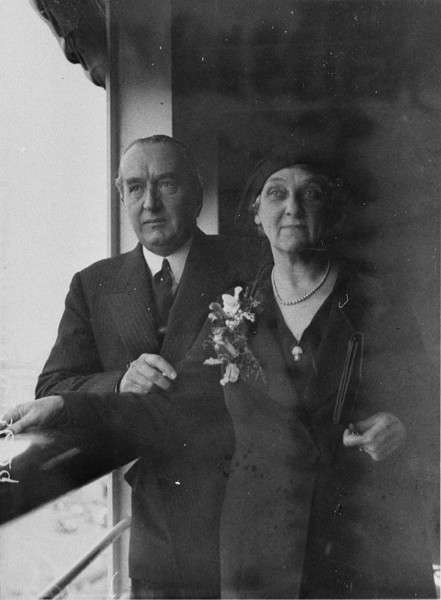
The Bruces arriving in England

Bruce returned to England after his defeat to holiday and attend to his business. Sir John Latham, took over as leader of the Nationalists. With the stock market crash in 1929 and the onset of the Great Depression in Australia, Bruce commented to his colleagues that their defeat was probably fortunate. But he ardently defended his government's record, maintaining that the economic crisis was inevitable and that his own policies were justified attempts to try to strengthen the Australian economy. It was this defence that he mounted in April 1931 when he announced he would return to politics and seek to regain his seat of Flinders at the next election. By now the Nationalists had regrouped as the United Australia Party (UAP) under Joseph Lyons, who had defected with several others from the embattled Scullin government.

In November 1931 the Scullin government was defeated in parliament over its controversial Premiers' Plan, catching Bruce by surprise as he was in England attending to Paterson, Laing and Bruce affairs when a new election was called. The Scullin government was subsequently defeated in a landslide, losing a then-record 32 seats; the two Labor factions were cut down to only 18 seats between them. With Holloway having abandoned Flinders to run in the much friendlier Melbourne Ports, Bruce was returned in absentia to his old seat, regaining it with a swing of 18.5 percent. He was appointed assistant treasurer in the new Lyons government, Lyons having taken the treasury portfolio personally. Lyons leaned heavily on Bruce and Latham in his first six months of government, though Bruce had by now set his sights on international affairs rather than the domestic crisis.

Bruce led the Australian delegation to the 1932 Imperial Economic Conference in Ottawa. He redoubled his efforts to improve Australian economic prospects with the empire, and the conference agreed to a limited form of his long-sought imperial preference scheme that would give Australia greater access and competitiveness in imperial markets over five years, an achievement for which Bruce received much praise from the Lyons government. The closer trading arrangements of the Ottawa Agreements would set the pattern for Australian-British trade relations until Britain's entry in the European Common Market in 1973.

After the success of the Imperial Economic Conference, Lyons appointed Bruce to London as Resident Minister in the United Kingdom – it was to remain his and Ethel's home for the rest of their lives. His first task in London was to renegotiate the terms of Australia's burgeoning government debts, the repayment of which was crippling Depression-era Australia. Over two years, he negotiated with the Westminster Bank and the British Government for loan conversions worth £84 million, which saved Australia millions of pounds in interest over several years and along with the Ottawa Agreements were significant in helping alleviate the Australian government's budgetary difficulties. Bruce was asked at several points during the 1930s to return to Australia by UAP backers and other political figures, who hoped that he could replace Lyons as prime minister. He himself had questioned Lyons' health and capacity to execute the role effectively, but he showed little interest in returning. In 1938 and 1939 Bruce was approached by senior UAP figures and Lyons himself to return to Australia and assume the leadership of the government, which was struggling under the ailing Lyons, but he either flatly declined or set conditions for his return (such as an all-party government behind him) that were impossible to meet.

== High Commissioner to the United Kingdom, 1933–1945 ==
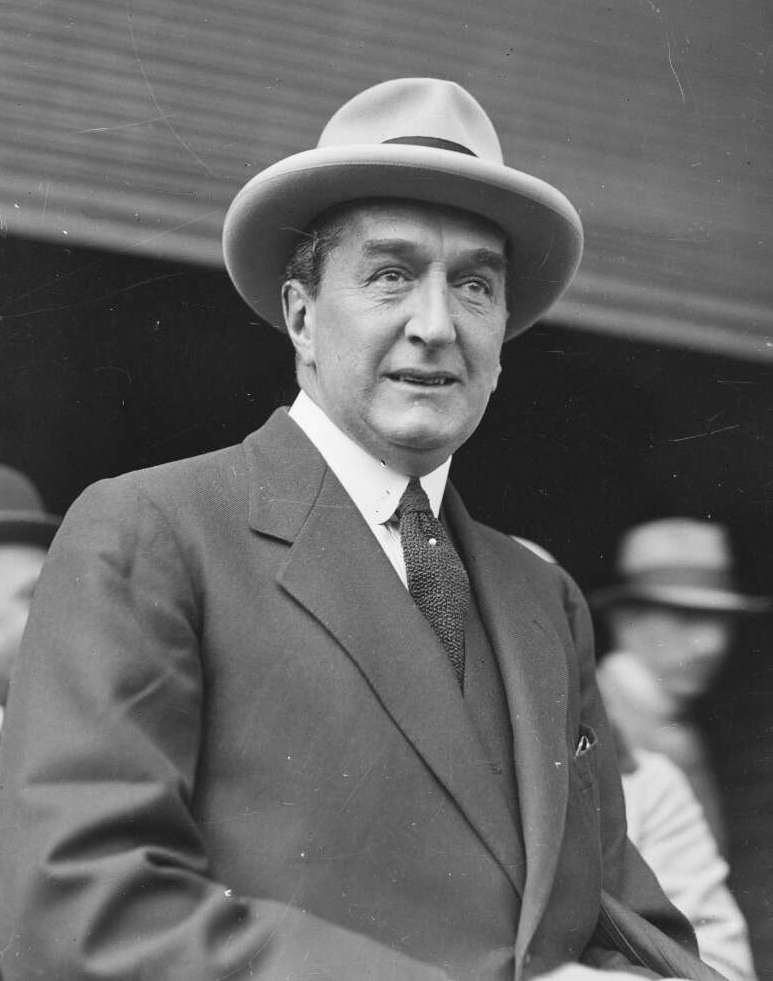
Bruce in 1934

In September 1933, Bruce was appointed by Lyons to replace the ailing Sir Granville Ryrie as High Commissioner to the United Kingdom, giving him ambassadorial rank. He formally resigned from parliament on 7 October 1933. Bruce would excel in the new post, becoming a trusted confidant among Conservative politicians and a familiar face in British government circles, which led to him at one point considering entering British politics formally. Bruce was particularly close to Prime Minister Stanley Baldwin, with whom he frequently consulted, and was notably influential in pressing for Edward VIII's abdication in 1936. His importance and power in London was due in part to the free rein that Lyons gave him – a rarity in the history of the position. Combined with the turmoil and frequent ministerial changes within the Commonwealth Department of External Affairs, Bruce was generally credited as Australia's most influential and credible international representative during his posting, often determining matters of foreign policy in his own right.

=== League of Nations ===
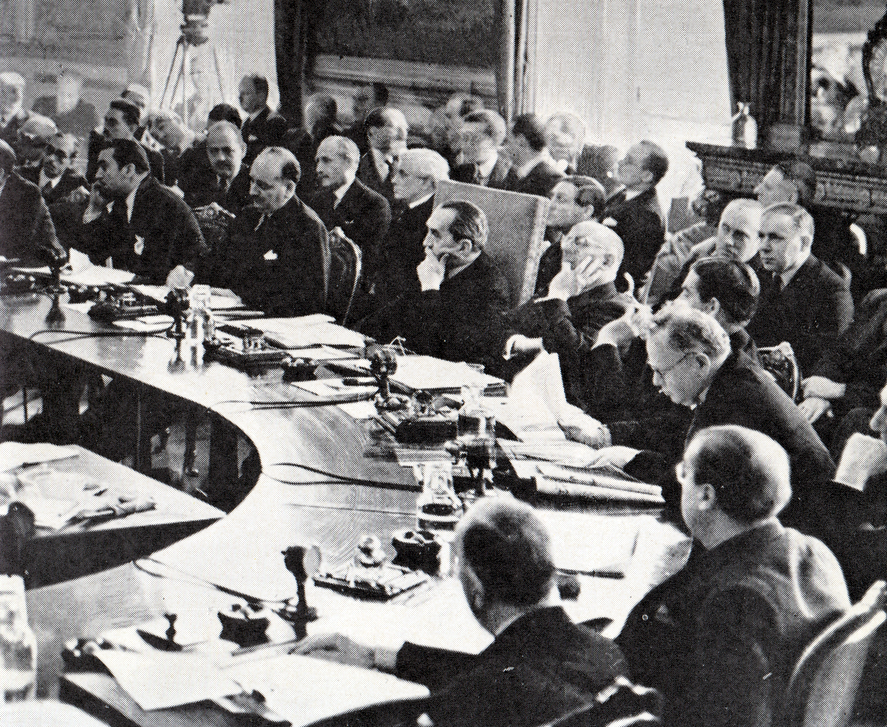
Bruce chairing the League of Nations Council in 1936. Joachim von Ribbentrop is addressing the council.

Bruce represented Australia at the League of Nations and successfully lobbied for Australia to participate as a member of the League Council from 1933 to 1936. He opposed action against Japan following the invasion of Manchuria in 1933, concerned as to Australia's trading relationship with Japan and the potential future threat it posed to peace in the Pacific. He also attempted to steer the League away from sanctioning member nations, believing it yet lacked the military or economic sway to do so effectively and feared the breakdown of the League – a prospect that loomed after Germany and Japan departed the body in 1933. During the Abyssinia Crisis, Bruce again counselled against partial sanctions, believing them the worst option as they would not stop the Ethiopian invasion and yet would alienate Italy – then a potential ally against a rearming Nazi Germany. He further argued for much greater rearmament efforts in the United Kingdom and France to provide greater military capacity to enforce future decisions by the League. Bruce assumed the presidency of the League of Nations Council in 1936 at the height of the crisis and after the failure of the Hoare–Laval Pact between France, Italy and Britain, but further attempts to forestall the invasion failed. He presided as League Council President during the Rhineland Crisis, although once again attempts to respond to fascist aggression failed. Although this did not shake his conviction in the potential of the League, he saw it doomed to failure without fundamental reforms to its structure and system of sanctions. He was nominated by Turkey to chair the 1936 Montreux Conference, which was far more successful in negotiating international agreement on passage through the Turkish Straits – an issue of particular relevance to Bruce as a veteran of the Gallipoli campaign. Despite the turmoil of his presidency, the League historian F.P. Walters would later describe Bruce as "the best, perhaps, of the many first-rate chairmen who presided over the Council, Conferences, or Committees of the League".

By 1937 Bruce's attention had shifted to social and economic co-operation, which he believed had far greater potential for success and was of greater importance to humanity at large. He had taken a leading role in promoting agriculture, nutrition and economic co-operation through the League of Nations, working intensively with Frank L. McDougall and John Boyd Orr throughout the decade. In 1937 he presented a plan of "economic appeasement", which built on this work and aimed to ease international tensions by reviving international trade and improving living standards in Europe through better working conditions, lower food prices, rural credits and housing assistance. Barriers to trade would gradually be reduced while European nations still recovering from the depression would be reintegrated into the international economy. In doing so he made a firm link between international trade and international peace, believing it key to unlocking world economic potential. Foreshadowing the logic of the Marshall Plan, Bruce argued that unrelieved economic and social hardship threatened to push other nations towards fascism or communism.

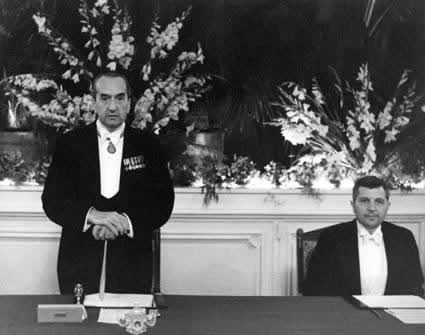
Bruce as Chairman of the Montreux Conference, 1938

I feel very strongly that it will be impossible to find a solution to the political problems of Europe and remove the present nightmare conditions unless something is done to improve the economic position ... it is vital for the prestige and future wellbeing of the League that it should afford active leadership towards bringing about economic appeasement.

The plan was supported by Secretary-General Joseph Louis Anne Avenol, who like Bruce recognised that the League was rapidly becoming moribund and that a major change of direction was needed, although neither was successful in convincing key states in contributing to the plan. Critically, new British prime minister Neville Chamberlain could not be convinced by Bruce to invest further into the development of the League, and the body began to lose its political impetus as war loomed. He would continue to press for League reform in the lead up to the war. The Bruce committee to advise on League reform was formed in 1939 in the aftermath of the partition of Czechoslovakia by Nazi Germany and the apparent failure of Chamberlain's appeasement policy. This committee, which met in July and August 1939, proposed a significant expansion of Bruce's earlier ideas to the League, bringing a wide range of economic and social programs under its purview as a means of fostering international co-operation. Their work, however, would be rendered moot by the outbreak of World War II.

=== World War II ===
In the events leading up to World War II, Bruce and Lyons had been supporters of the British under Chamberlain and the policy of appeasement exercised with regards to the reoccupation of the Rhineland, the Anschluss and the Munich Crisis. Even during the "phoney war", Bruce continued to advocate the implementation of a more durable international system to enforce peace through mutual disarmament, the expansion of transnational trade, and global organisations capable of addressing the pressing social and economic questions that he felt were the recurrent causes of international conflict. He had become a close confidant of senior Conservative Party figures Anthony Eden and Neville Chamberlain in this period, and was strident in advancing the opinion of Australia (and the dominions more broadly) that negotiation and compromise with Nazi Germany was preferable to war. Bruce actively participated in the negotiations for the Munich Agreement. When Lyons died in April 1939, Earle Page and Richard Casey personally appealed for Bruce to return to Australia and take over once more as prime minister at the head of the UAP. Bruce demurred, however, and made it the condition of his return that he be allowed to sit in parliament as an independent and lead an all-party unity government. Such conditions were politically impossible to meet, and Robert Menzies was elected as the new leader of the UAP.

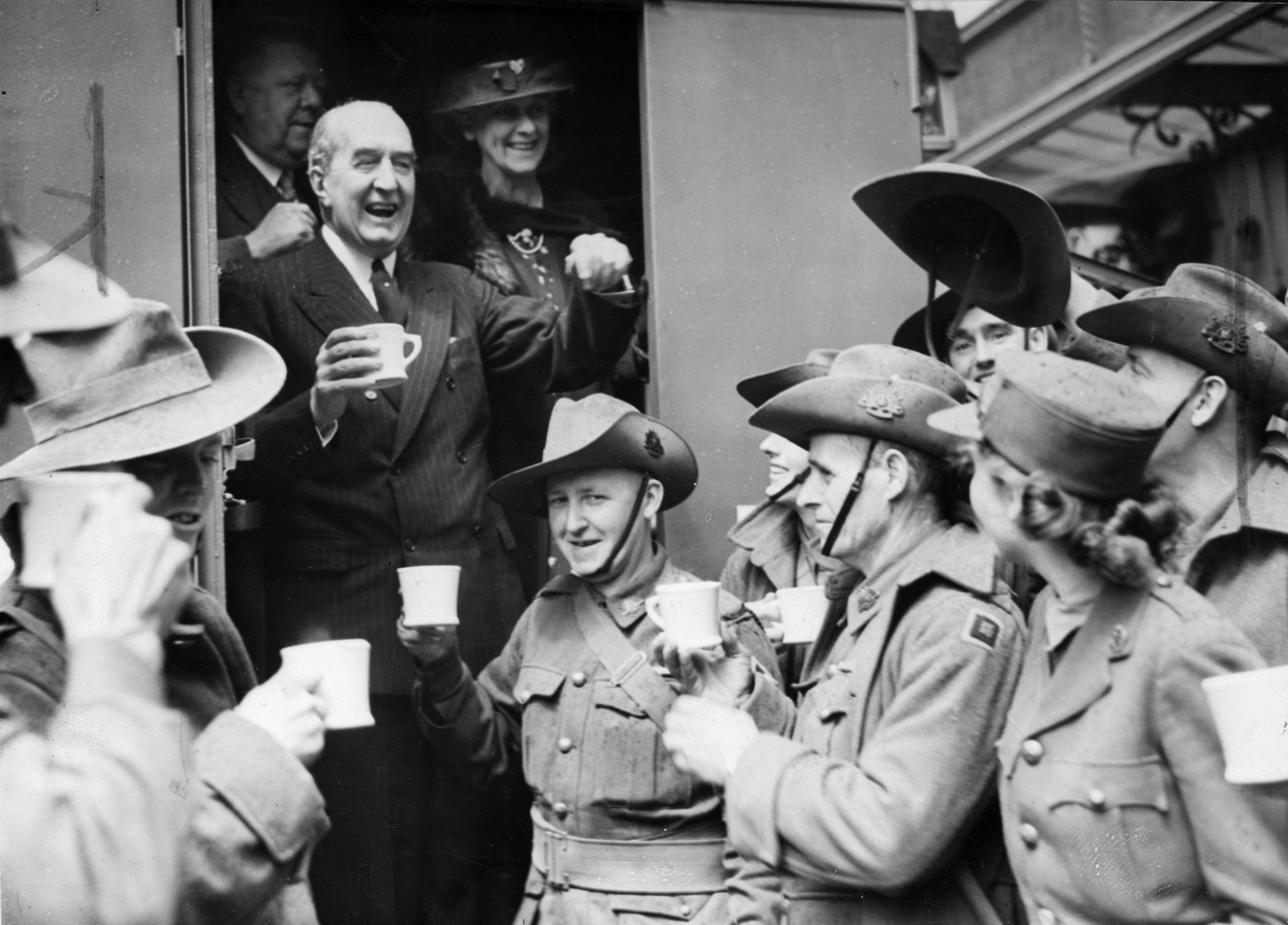
High Commissioner Bruce drinking tea with Australian troops in London during World War II

Britain's declaration of war against Germany on 3 September 1939 was followed within hours by Australia's prime minister Menzies stating that because of Britain's declaration Australia too was now at war with Germany. Winston Churchill's accession as British prime minister in May 1940 brought Bruce into frequent conflict with the British government. Churchill saw the dominions as still semi-dependent colonies who were at London's command whereas Bruce saw the Empire as a kind of international partnership and the dominions as rightful parties to the decision-making process. Britain's preoccupation with the European theatre alarmed Australian politicians, given the tenuous position of Far Eastern possessions and the looming possibility of Japanese invasion.

After a string of defeats in the Far East, particularly the Fall of Singapore, the Australian government was finally successful in having Bruce accredited to the British War Cabinet and Pacific War Council as an Australian (and dominion) representative. However, Bruce soon became embroiled in the disputes over Churchill's autocratic leadership style and his lack of consultation with the cabinet over war decisions. He was regularly left out of cabinet communique or not invited to meetings, much to his displeasure. With the fear of Japanese invasion mounting in Australia throughout 1942, Bruce directly confronted Churchill on a number of occasions over Far East policy and the continuing lack of consultation with Australia and his own cabinet. Churchill usually responded by rebuffing him or pointedly excluding him further from government business. Although outwardly relenting in the face of pressure exerted by the dominions for representation in war decisions, Churchill routinely marginalised or ignored that representation. Bruce persisted in this difficult arrangement until May 1944 when he became completely disillusioned and resigned, choosing other forums in which to represent Australia in London. In spite of his tempestuous relationship with Churchill, Bruce was held in high regard by many cabinet members, particularly future prime ministers Clement Attlee and Anthony Eden, and his dogged determination to advance dominion interests during the war years earned him high praise from John Curtin and the other dominion prime ministers.

== Food and Agriculture Organization, 1946–1951 ==
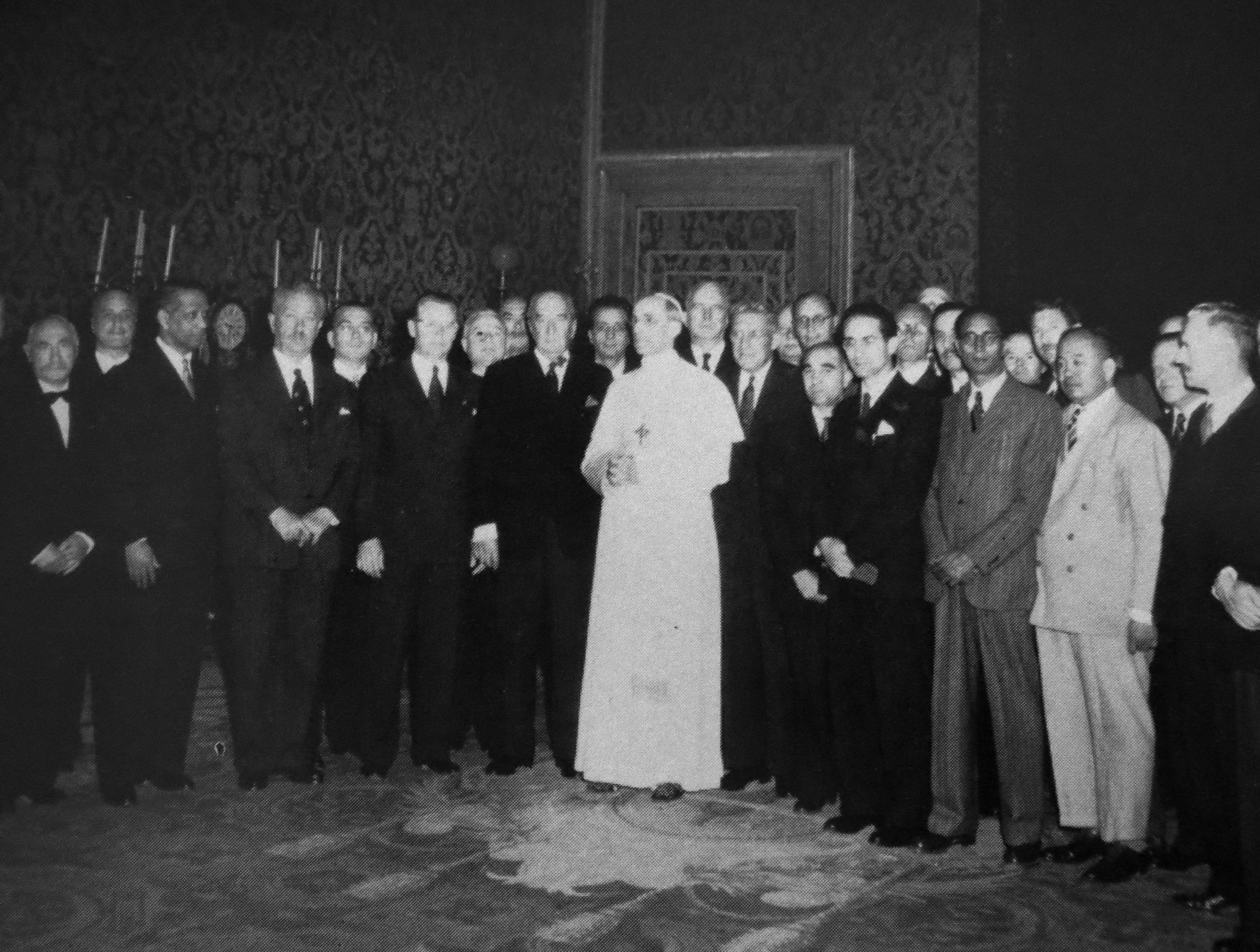
Pope Pius XII with chairman Bruce and members of the World Food Council in Rome, 1950

By the war's end in 1945, Bruce had become tired of the High Commission posting and hinted to Curtin's successor Ben Chifley that he would not object to being replaced in the position. In the last years of the war he had envisaged a post-war order based on a continuing alliance of the four powers – the United States, the British Empire, the Soviet Union and China – that could evolve into a new international body with a similar function as the League of Nations, but with a stronger role and authority in international matters. Bruce had rejoined Frank McDougall and John Boyd Orr in these years in reviving their proposals for international co-operation on nutrition and agriculture. He wrote and made representations at all levels on the subject, and became a leading voice once more advocating the creation of an international body to examine social and economic questions, much as he had done during his years with the League of Nations. The efforts of McDougall, Bruce and Orr finally paid off when their work came to the attention of Eleanor Roosevelt, and subsequently the American government, and their proposals would find expression at the Food and Agriculture Conference that Franklin Roosevelt convened in Hot Springs, Virginia, in May 1943. This conference agreed to the establishment of the Food and Agriculture Organization (FAO), which became an associated institution with the United Nations when it was established formally in October 1945.

As the war in Europe drew to a close and the United Nations Charter was promulgated in June 1945, Bruce's name was among those being considered to become the first Secretary-General of the United Nations, with American Secretary of State Dean Acheson and British Foreign Secretary Anthony Eden actively supporting his candidacy. Bruce, however, was now 62 and indicated that he felt himself too old for the position, instead preferring a less demanding role considering economic and social questions. In 1946 he assumed the chairmanship of the FAO Preparatory Commission on World Food Proposals, which had the mission of establishing a "world food board" to coordinate international policy on nutrition and develop a system to eliminate global agricultural shortages. He proposed many international schemes as part of this work, particularly a world food reserve and special pricing mechanisms to reallocate and release food to where it was most needed in times of need. Bruce's Commission also placed a high emphasis on agricultural modernisation, international development aid, commodity agreements and price stability to help starving developing nations in its findings presented in 1947. The proposals were never adopted, as the costs and challenges to national sovereignty proved too difficult to overcome politically.

Undeterred, Bruce was elected Chairman of the newly formed FAO Council in November 1947, working once more with John Boyd Orr, now Secretary-General of the FAO. Acute shortages of cereals and livestock were rampant following severe droughts in Europe, and the international food supply system was under serious strain after the devastation of the war. Bruce and the council worked in these years to distribute fertiliser and agricultural machinery, as well as improve nutrition, especially in less developed nations. More than two-thirds of the world was undernourished in 1949 and Bruce felt it imperative for the council to bring these stark facts to the developed nations. A landmark agreement on technical aid between the FAO and the United Nations was reached in November 1949, and the FAO received the funding and logistical capacity to act on the food shortage crisis and the problems of poor nutrition in the developing world. Bruce and the FAO were successful in these years in supporting the recovery of world agricultural output. By 1951 this had exceeded pre-war levels, and general levels of nutrition were rising internationally, but by the time Bruce stepped down in that year neither had improved fast enough to keep pace with the post-war population boom. The Council faced major obstacles in supporting the improvement of conditions in the developing world as governments there began diverting resources to arms programs as independence, post-colonial and Cold War conflicts multiplied. Frustrated by continuing world conflict and the lack of commitment from the developed world to support the lofty but very difficult aims of the FAO, both Bruce and Orr resigned from the FAO disappointed by its modest gains and insufficient powers to alleviate world food problems.

== Later life ==
Arms of Viscount Bruce of Melbourne Or, a saltire gules cantoned between four mullets sable, on a chief of the second a pale argent charged with a saltire of the third

Bruce occupied a range of positions in his later years, sharing his time between the United Kingdom and Australia. He had been Chairman of the Finance Corporation of Industry since 1946 and continued in the role until 1957, providing finance to projects of benefit to the British national economy. Bruce helped establish the program in Australia in 1954 and on a Commonwealth basis in 1956. He became the first Chancellor of the newly established Australian National University in 1952, and took an active interest in its development, especially as a research centre for the study of Asia and the Pacific. Bruce concluded that Australia's position in the world had changed as a result of World War II, commenting:

[Australia] has become a bridgehead between East and West. It is now vital that Australia should understand the problems of the East, that she should do whatever is in her power to alleviate those problems, and that she should interpret the nature of those problems to the rest of the world.

The residential college Bruce Hall was named in his honour, and he remained active in the life of the university until his retirement from the position in 1961. Bruce sat as director on many corporate boards in retirement, notably the National Bank of Australia, P&O and National Mutual. In 1947 he became the first Australian to sit in the House of Lords (Sir John Forrest had been granted a peerage but died before it could be invested).

Having been elevated to the peerage as Viscount Bruce of Melbourne by long-time colleague Clement Attlee, he would be an active participant in the chamber, attending regularly until his death. Bruce used it as a platform to continue to campaign on international and national social and economic questions, and to promote recognition and representation for Australia within the Commonwealth, though by this time Australian and British interests were becoming increasingly far apart, and the British Empire was rapidly disintegrating. He also continued to lobby the British government in these years to increase its commitment to third world development and the FAO. An avid golfer his whole life, Bruce became the first Australian captain of the Royal and Ancient Golf Club of St Andrews in 1954. From 1948 to 1952 he was President of Leander Club, while continuing to coach rowing at Cambridge University sporadically, and frequently appeared at public events both in Australia and in England.

== Death ==
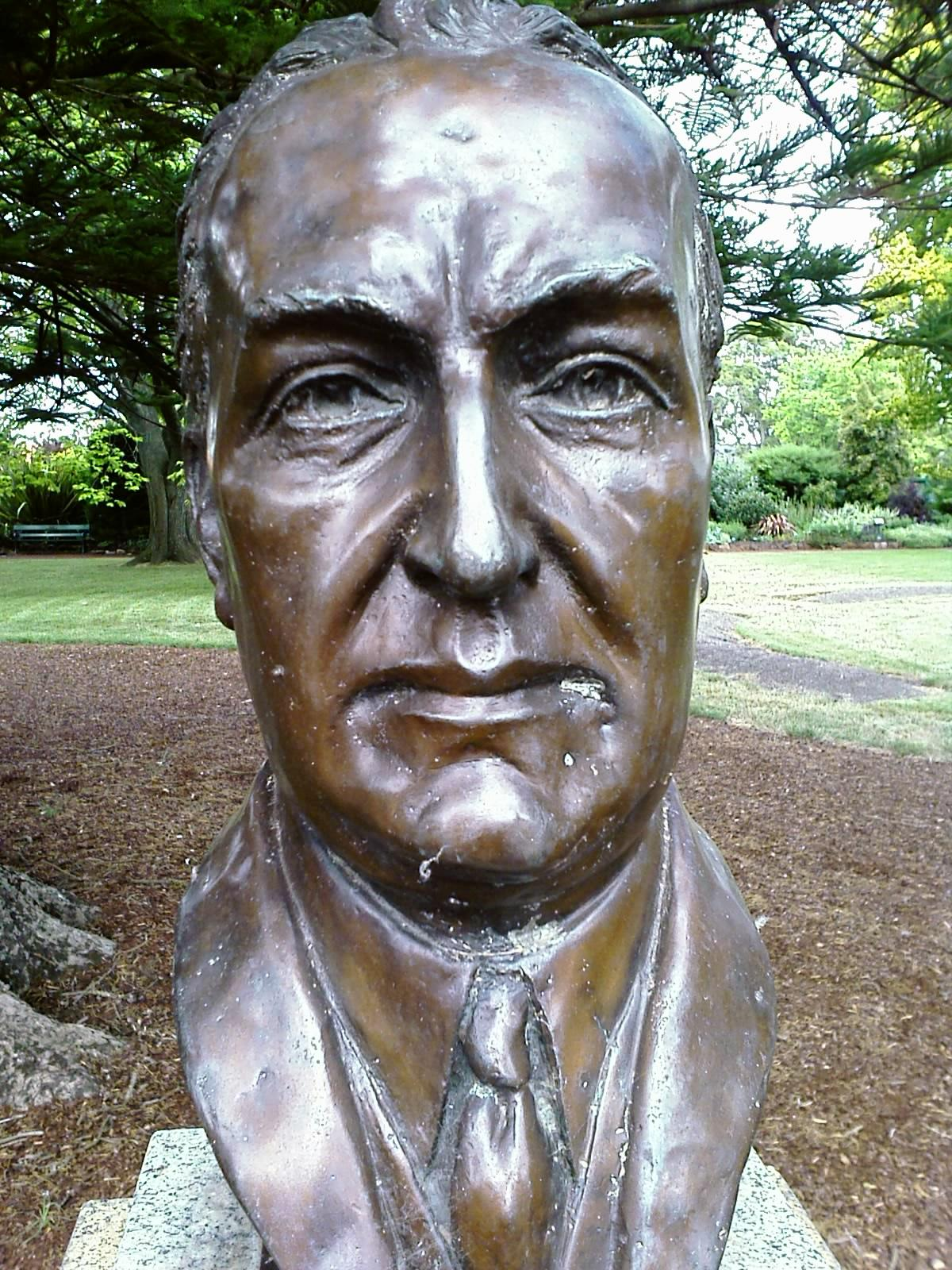
Bust of Stanley Bruce by sculptor Wallace Anderson located in the Prime Ministers Avenue in the Ballarat Botanical Gardens in Ballarat, Victoria

Bruce remained active and in good health right through his retirement despite the gradual onset of deafness, but the death of his wife Ethel in March 1967 took a deep toll on him. He died on 25 August 1967 at the age of 84. He was the last surviving member of Billy Hughes' Cabinet. His memorial service was held at St Martin-in-the-Fields and was widely attended, including by representatives of the Royal Family. His ashes were scattered over Lake Burley Griffin in Canberra. The Canberra suburb of Bruce, and the electoral Division of Bruce based in south-east Melbourne, were both named for him.

== Legacy and evaluation ==
Despite his many accomplishments both at home and abroad, Bruce's post-prime ministerial career was not well known in Australia, and most still harboured memories of his harsh anti-union legislation and his government's landslide defeat in 1929. His public persona was one of an aloof man, too English for Australia in style and bearing. Upon his death in 1967, The Age of his hometown Melbourne remarked that "for most Australians, he is little more than a shadow." Bruce spent much of his life and career in the United Kingdom, the country that conversely held him in high regard, but never forgot his Australian roots and for much of his career was a tireless advocate for its interests. In contrast to his image as a member of the British aristocratic elite, he spent much of his later career working for solutions to the problems facing the world's poorest.

Bruce was high-minded and ambitious in setting an agenda – as prime minister he pursued complex and aspiring schemes of economic, social and administrative development, including grandiose solutions to the problem of industrial relations and an egalitarian reworking of the British Empire. In his diplomatic career he pursued better treatment for the Commonwealth and programs through the League of Nations and United Nations that would address world questions of pressing social and economic concern, culminating in his most ambitious work to eliminate world hunger through the Food and Agriculture Organization. The Australian government even nominated Bruce for the Nobel Peace Prize in recognition for these efforts. Yet his schemes frequently bordered on the idealistic, and he was frequently disappointed at the limited degree to which he could practically implement his ideas. As Bruce himself would concede in later life, he was overly ambitious by nature and "forever buying into things that aren't really my concern". But despite his lack of public recognition in Australia, peers and historians have long recognised the abiding impact Bruce had both as prime minister and internationalist, leading his successor as Chancellor of the Australian National University Sir John Cockcroft to conclude in 1962 that Bruce was "probably the outstanding Australian of our time". The Melbourne Sun agreed with the assessment, stating upon his death that Bruce was "probably the least remembered but the most extraordinary of our Prime Ministers".

== See also ==
- First Bruce Ministry
- Second Bruce Ministry
- Third Bruce Ministry
- Bruce Manor

== Bibliography ==
=== Biographies ===
- Cumpston, Ina Mary (1989). Lord Bruce of Melbourne. Melbourne: Longman Cheshire. ISBN 0-582-71274-2.
- Edwards, Cecil (1965). Bruce of Melbourne : Man of Two Worlds. London: Heinemann.
- Fitzhardinge, Laurence Frederic (1979). William Morris Hughes: A Political Biography. Volume 2: The Little Digger, 1914–1952. Sydney: Angus & Robertson. ISBN 0-207-13245-3.
- Henderson, Anne (2011). Joseph Lyons: The People's Prime Minister. Sydney: NewSouth. ISBN 978-1-74223-142-6.
- Lee, David (2010). Stanley Melbourne Bruce: Australian Internationalist. London: Continuum Press. ISBN 978-0-8264-4566-7.
- ————— (2020). Stanley Melbourne Bruce: Institution Builder. Australian Biographical Monographs. Vol. 7. Redland Bay, Qld: Connor Court Publishing. ISBN 9781922449177.
- Stirling, Alfred (1974). Lord Bruce: The London Years. Melbourne: Hawthorn Press. ISBN 0-7256-0125-6.

=== General histories ===
- Alexander, Fred (1982). Australia Since Federation : A Narrative and Critical Analysis (Updated ed.). Melbourne: Nelson. ISBN 0-17-005861-1.
- Andrews, Eric Montgomery (1988). A History of Australian Foreign Policy. Melbourne: Longman Cheshire. ISBN 0-582-66368-7.
- Brett, Judith (2003). Australian Liberals and the Moral Middle Class: From Alfred Deakin to John Howard. Melbourne: Cambridge University Press. ISBN 0-521-53634-0.
- Carroll, Brian (2004). Australia's Prime Ministers: From Barton to Howard (Revised ed.). Dural, NSW: Rosenberg Publishing. ISBN 1-877058-22-X.
- Edwards, P.G. (1978). "The Rise and Fall of the High Commissioner: S.M.Bruce in London, 1933–45". In Madden, A.F.; Morris-Jones, W.H. (eds.). Australia and Britain: Studies in a Changing Relationship. London: Frank Cass. ISBN 0-203-98820-5.
- Hasluck, Paul (1970). The Government and the People, 1942–1945. Canberra: Australian War Memorial. ISBN 0-642-99367-X.
- Hudson, William James (1980). Australia and the League of Nations. Sydney: Sydney University Press. ISBN 0-424-00084-9.
- Macintyre, Stuart (2009). A Concise History of Australia (Third ed.). Melbourne: Cambridge University Press. ISBN 978-0-521-51608-2.
- Millmow, Alex (2010). The Power of Economic Ideas: The Origins of Keynesian Macroeconomic Management in Interwar Australia, 1929–39. Canberra: ANU E-Press. ISBN 978-1-921666-27-8.
- Murray, Robert (1970). The Confident Years : Australia in the Twenties. London: Allen Lane. ISBN 0-7139-1155-7.
- Nethercote, John (2001). Liberalism and the Australian Federation. Annandale, NSW: Federation Press. ISBN 1-86287-402-6.
- Plowman, David (1989). Holding the Line: Compulsory Arbitration and National Employer Co-ordination in Australia. Cambridge, UK: Cambridge University Press. ISBN 0-521-36085-4.
- Reid, G.S.; Forrest, Martyn (1989). Australia's Commonwealth Parliament 1901–1988: Ten Perspectives. Carlton, Victoria: Melbourne University Press. ISBN 0-522-84418-9.
- Sawer, Geoffrey (1956). Australian Federal Politics and Law, 1901–1929. Melbourne: Melbourne University Press.
- Schedvin, C.B. (1989). Australia and the Great Depression. Sydney: Sydney University Press. ISBN 0-424-06660-2.
- Souter, Gavin (1988). Acts of Parliament : A Narrative History of the Senate and House of Representatives. Carlton, Victoria: Melbourne University Press. ISBN 0-522-84367-0.
- Starr, Graeme (1978). "The Liberal Party of Australia". In Starr, Graeme; Richmond, Keith; Maddox, Graham (eds.). Political Parties in Australia. Richmond, Victoria: Heinemann Educational Australia. ISBN 0-85859-178-2.
- Weller, Patrick (2007). Cabinet Government in Australia, 1901–2006. Sydney: UNSW Press. ISBN 978-0-86840-874-3.
- Wildavsky, Aaron (1958). The 1926 Referendum. Melbourne: Cheshire.

=== Periodicals ===
- Barber, Stephen (2011). "Federal Election Results, 1901–2010". Parliamentary Library Research Papers. Canberra: Department of the Parliamentary Library.
- Commonwealth of Australia. Parliamentary Debates. Canberra: House of Representatives.
- Hawkins, John (2009). "SM Bruce: The Businessman as Treasurer". Economic Round-Up. 3: 71–83.
- Mathews, Russell (1977). "Innovations and Development in Australian Federalism". Publius. 7 (3): 9–19.

=== Online ===
- "Stanley Bruce, Prime Minister of Australia". Canberra: National Archives of Australia. Archived from the original on 14 October 2018.
- "Stanley Melbourne Bruce (1883–1967)". Bruce, Stanley Melbourne (1883–1967). Australian Dictionary of Biography. Canberra: National Centre of Biography, Australian National University.
- "S.M. Bruce: The Business Man as Treasurer". Canberra: Treasury of Australia. Archived from the original on 2 February 2014.

Parliament of Australia
Preceded by William Irvine	Member for Flinders; 1918–1929	Succeeded by Jack Holloway
Preceded by Jack Holloway	Member for Flinders; 1931–1933	Succeeded by James Fairbairn
Political offices
Preceded by Sir Joseph Cook	Treasurer of Australia; 1921–1923	Succeeded by Earle Page
Preceded by Billy Hughes	Prime Minister of Australia; 1923–1929	Succeeded by James Scullin
Preceded by Billy Hughes	Minister for External Affairs; 1923–1929	Succeeded by James Scullin
Preceded by Sir Neville Howse	Minister for Health; 1927–1928	Succeeded by Sir Neville Howse
Preceded by Herbert Pratten	Minister for Trade and Customs; 1928	Succeeded by Henry Gullett
Party political offices
Preceded by Billy Hughes	Leader of the Nationalist Party of Australia; 1922–1929	Succeeded by John Latham
Diplomatic posts
Preceded by Sir Granville Ryrie	Australian High Commissioner to the United Kingdom; 1933–1945	Succeeded by Jack Beasley
New title Position established	Australian Minister to the Netherlands; 1942–1945	Succeeded by John Hood as Chargé d'affaires
Peerage of the United Kingdom
New title	Viscount Bruce of Melbourne; 1947–1967	Extinct
Academic offices
Preceded by Richard Charles Mills as Chair of the Interim Council	Chancellor of the Australian National University; 1951–1961	Succeeded by John Cockcroft
