= First Bruce ministry =

16th ministry of government of Australia

- 16th Ministry of Australia

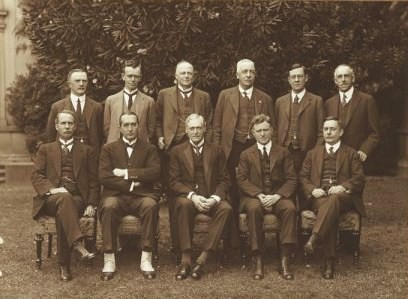
- Group photo of the First Bruce ministry
- Date formed: 9 February 1923
- Date dissolved: 18 December 1925

People and organisations
- Monarch: George V
- Governor-General: Lord Forster; Lord Stonehaven
- Prime Minister: Stanley Bruce
- No. of ministers: 15
- Member party: Nationalist–Country coalition
- Status in legislature: Coalition majority government
- Opposition party: Labor
- Opposition leader: Matthew Charlton

History
- Election: 16 December 1922
- Outgoing election: 14 November 1925
- Legislature term: 9th
- Predecessor: Fifth Hughes ministry
- Successor: Second Bruce ministry

The First Bruce ministry (Nationalist–Country Coalition) was the 16th ministry of the Government of Australia. It was led by the country's 8th prime minister, Stanley Bruce. The First Bruce ministry succeeded the Fifth Hughes ministry, which dissolved on 9 February 1923 following the December 1922 federal election and the subsequent resignation of Billy Hughes as prime minister. The Nationalists had lost their majority in the election, and had no choice but to negotiate a Coalition deal with the Country Party. However, Country leader Earle Page let it be known that no deal could be made unless Hughes resigned. It is the first ministry that consists of a centre-right Coalition between the senior conservative party and the junior rural party - this Coalition has more or less endured to this day with the modern-day Liberal Party and National Party. The ministry was replaced by the Second Bruce ministry on 18 December 1925 following the 1925 federal election.

Stanley Bruce, who died in 1967, was the last surviving member of the First Bruce ministry; Bruce was also the last surviving member of the Fifth Hughes ministry and the Second Bruce ministry. Earle Page was the last surviving Country minister.

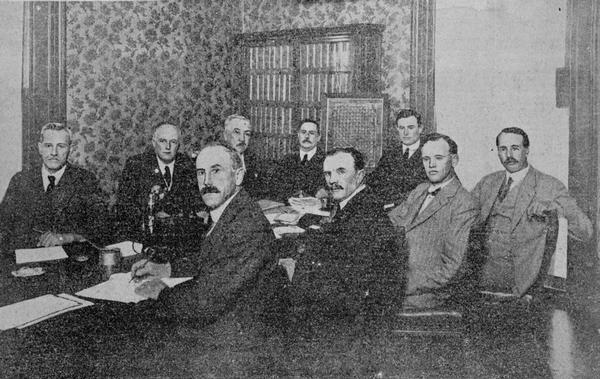
The ministry meets in Canberra for the first time, at Yarralumla House, on 30 January 1924.

== Ministry ==
Party	Minister	Portrait	Portfolio
Nationalist	Stanley Bruce (1883–1967) MP for Flinders (1918–1929)		Prime Minister; Leader of the Nationalist Party; Minister for External Affairs
Country	Earle Page (1880–1961) MP for Cowper (1919–1961)		Leader of the Country Party; Treasurer
Nationalist	Sir Littleton Groom (1867–1936) MP for Darling Downs (1901–1929)		Attorney-General; Minister for Trade and Customs (from 26 May 1924 to 13 June 1924); Minister for Health (from 26 May 1924 to 13 June 1924)
Nationalist	George Pearce (1870–1952) Senator for Western Australia (1901–1938)		Minister for Home and Territories; Leader of the Government in the Senate
Nationalist	Austin Chapman (1864–1926) MP for Eden-Monaro (1901–1926)		Minister for Trade and Customs (to 26 May 1924); Minister for Health (to 26 May 1924)
Country	Percy Stewart (1885–1931) MP for Wimmera (1919–1931)		Minister for Works and Railways (to 8 August 1924)
Nationalist	Eric Bowden (1871–1931) MP for Parramatta (1922–1929)		Minister for Defence (to 16 January 1925)
Country	William Gibson (1869–1955) MP for Corangamite (1918–1929)		Deputy Leader of the Country Party; Postmaster-General
Country	Llewellyn Atkinson (1867–1945) MP for Wilmot (1906–1929)		Vice-President of the Executive Council
Nationalist	Victor Wilson (1877–1957) Senator for South Australia (1920–1926)		Honorary Minister (to 16 January 1925); Minister for Markets and Migration (from 16 January 1925)
Nationalist	Thomas Crawford (1865–1948) Senator for Queensland (1917–1947) (in Ministry from 14 February 1923)		Honorary Minister (from 14 February 1923)
Nationalist	Herbert Pratten (1865–1928) MP for Martin (1922–1928) (in Ministry from 13 June 1924)		Minister for Trade and Customs (from 13 June 1924); Minister for Health (from 13 June 1924 to 16 January 1925)
Country	William Hill (1866–1939) MP for Echuca (1919–1934) (in Ministry from 8 August 1924)		Minister for Works and Railways (from 8 August 1924)
Nationalist	Sir Neville Howse (1863–1930) MP for Calare (1922–1929) (in Ministry from 16 January 1925)		Minister for Defence (from 16 January 1925); Minister for Health (from 16 January 1925)
Nationalist	Charles Marr (1880–1960) MP for Parkes (1919–1929) (in Ministry from 16 January 1925)		Chief Government Whip in the House; Honorary Minister (from 16 January 1925)
