= Electoral results for the Division of Parkes (1901–1969) =

Australian division election results

This is a list of electoral results for the Division of Parkes (1901–69) in Australian federal elections from the division's creation in 1901 until its abolition in 1969.

== Members ==
Member	Party	Term
Bruce Smith	Free Trade, Anti-Socialist	1901–1909
Bruce Smith	Liberal	1909–1917
Bruce Smith	Nationalist	1917–1919
Bruce Smith	Independent	1919–1919
Charles Marr	Nationalist	1919–1929
Edward McTiernan	Labor	1929–1930
(Sir) Charles Marr	Nationalist	1931–1931
(Sir) Charles Marr	United Australia	1931–1943
Les Haylen	Labor	1943–1963
Tom Hughes	Liberal	1963–1969

== Election results ==
=== Elections in the 1960s ===
==== 1966 ====
1966 Australian federal election: Parkes
Party	Candidate	Votes	%	±%
Liberal	Tom Hughes	19,196	51.2	+3.5
Labor	Doug Sutherland	14,843	39.6	−6.7
Liberal Reform Group	John Crew	2,364	6.3	+6.3
Democratic Labor	Kevin Davis	1,122	3.0	−3.0
Total formal votes		37,525	96.1	
Informal votes		1,505	3.9	
Turnout		39,030	94.0	
Two-party-preferred result
Liberal	Tom Hughes		55.9	+4.2
Labor	Doug Sutherland		44.1	−4.2
Liberal hold		Swing	+4.2	

==== 1963 ====
1963 Australian federal election: Parkes
Party	Candidate	Votes	%	±%
Liberal	Tom Hughes	18,437	47.7	+9.8
Labor	Les Haylen	17,900	46.3	−6.2
Democratic Labor	Vincent Couch	2,331	6.0	−3.6
Total formal votes		38,668	98.3	
Informal votes		676	1.7	
Turnout		39,344	95.6	
Two-party-preferred result
Liberal	Tom Hughes	19,994	51.7	+5.9
Labor	Les Haylen	18,674	48.3	−5.9
Liberal gain from Labor		Swing	+5.9	

==== 1961 ====
1961 Australian federal election: Parkes
Party	Candidate	Votes	%	±%
Labor	Les Haylen	20,352	52.5	+2.6
Liberal	William Dowd	14,675	37.9	−7.2
Democratic Labor	Vincent Couch	3,725	9.6	+4.6
Total formal votes		38,752	97.3	
Informal votes		1,079	2.7	
Turnout		39,831	95.0	
Two-party-preferred result
Labor	Les Haylen		54.2	+3.2
Liberal	William Dowd		45.8	−3.2
Labor hold		Swing	+3.2	

=== Elections in the 1950s ===
==== 1958 ====
1958 Australian federal election: Parkes
Party	Candidate	Votes	%	±%
Labor	Les Haylen	20,096	49.9	−0.8
Liberal	George Chambers	18,178	45.1	−4.2
Democratic Labor	Maurice Colreavy	2,024	5.0	+5.0
Total formal votes		40,298	97.2	
Informal votes		1,167	2.8	
Turnout		41,465	95.5	
Two-party-preferred result
Labor	Les Haylen	20,562	51.0	+0.3
Liberal	George Chambers	19,736	49.0	−0.3
Labor hold		Swing	+0.3	

==== 1955 ====
1955 Australian federal election: Parkes
Party	Candidate	Votes	%	±%
Labor	Les Haylen	20,895	50.7	−2.0
Liberal	John Spicer	20,295	49.3	+2.0
Total formal votes		41,190	97.0	
Informal votes		1,269	3.0	
Turnout		42,459	95.6	
Labor hold		Swing	−2.0	

==== 1954 ====
1954 Australian federal election: Parkes
Party	Candidate	Votes	%	±%
Labor	Les Haylen	19,307	56.0	+5.1
Liberal	William Ness	15,173	44.0	−5.1
Total formal votes		34,480	98.7	
Informal votes		466	1.3	
Turnout		34,946	96.4	
Labor hold		Swing	+5.1	

==== 1951 ====
1951 Australian federal election: Parkes
Party	Candidate	Votes	%	±%
Labor	Les Haylen	18,964	50.9	−0.9
Liberal	Dick Dein	18,283	49.1	+0.9
Total formal votes		37,247	98.2	
Informal votes		676	1.8	
Turnout		37,923	96.1	
Labor hold		Swing	−0.9	

=== Elections in the 1940s ===
==== 1949 ====
1949 Australian federal election: Parkes
Party	Candidate	Votes	%	±%
Labor	Les Haylen	19,966	51.8	−8.2
Liberal	Dick Dein	18,579	48.2	+8.5
Total formal votes		38,545	97.9	
Informal votes		826	2.1	
Turnout		39,371	97.0	
Labor hold		Swing	−7.8	

==== 1946 ====
1946 Australian federal election: Parkes
Party	Candidate	Votes	%	±%
Labor	Les Haylen	32,806	50.1	+1.6
Liberal	Athol Richardson	32,642	49.9	+22.1
Total formal votes		65,448	98.2	
Informal votes		1,176	1.8	
Turnout		66,624	95.6	
Labor hold		Swing	−2.8	

==== 1943 ====
1943 Australian federal election: Parkes
Party	Candidate	Votes	%	±%
Labor	Les Haylen	29,891	48.5	+10.8
United Australia	Sir Charles Marr	17,141	27.8	−22.7
Liberal Democratic	Nigel Love	12,020	19.5	+19.5
Women	Pauline Budge	1,301	2.1	+2.1
One Parliament	Arthur Miles	929	1.5	+1.5
Independent	Francis Wilson	171	0.3	+0.3
Independent	Arthur Thompson	155	0.3	+0.3
Total formal votes		61,608	96.7	
Informal votes		2,074	3.3	
Turnout		63,682	97.4	
Two-party-preferred result
Labor	Les Haylen		52.9	+10.3
United Australia	Sir Charles Marr		47.1	−10.3
Labor gain from United Australia		Swing	+10.3	

==== 1940 ====
1940 Australian federal election: Parkes
Party	Candidate	Votes	%	±%
United Australia	Sir Charles Marr	28,909	50.5	−13.2
Labor	Daniel Murphy	21,565	37.7	+1.4
Independent	David Knox	6,785	11.8	+11.8
Total formal votes		57,259	98.6	
Informal votes		833	1.4	
Turnout		58,092	95.6	
Two-party-preferred result
United Australia	Sir Charles Marr		57.4	−6.3
Labor	Daniel Murphy		42.6	+6.3
United Australia hold		Swing	−6.3	

=== Elections in the 1930s ===
==== 1937 ====
1937 Australian federal election: Parkes
Party	Candidate	Votes	%	±%
United Australia	Sir Charles Marr	35,468	63.7	+3.7
Labor	Karl Guhl	20,217	36.3	+36.3
Total formal votes		55,685	98.1	
Informal votes		1,050	1.9	
Turnout		56,735	96.8	
United Australia hold		Swing	−2.6	

==== 1934 ====
1934 Australian federal election: Parkes
Party	Candidate	Votes	%	±%
United Australia	Charles Marr	31,745	60.0	−1.3
Labor (NSW)	Leo Taylor	15,591	29.5	+6.1
Social Credit	Harold Bondeson	5,564	10.5	+10.5
Total formal votes		52,900	97.9	
Informal votes		1,108	2.1	
Turnout		54,008	95.7	
Two-party-preferred result
United Australia	Charles Marr		66.3	+0.5
Labor (NSW)	Leo Taylor		33.7	−0.5
United Australia hold		Swing	+0.5	

==== 1931 ====
1931 Australian federal election: Parkes
Party	Candidate	Votes	%	±%
United Australia	Charles Marr	34,502	59.9	+17.7
Labor (NSW)	Herbert Garden	16,483	28.6	+28.6
Labor	William Gibbs	6,636	11.5	−46.3
Total formal votes		57,621	97.5	
Informal votes		1,460	2.5	
Turnout		59,081	94.2	
Two-party-preferred result
United Australia	Charles Marr		62.8	+20.6
Labor (NSW)	Herbert Garden		37.2	+37.2
United Australia hold		Swing	+20.6	

1931 Parkes by-election
Party	Candidate	Votes	%	±%
Nationalist	Charles Marr	31,227	56.8	+14.6
Labor	Joseph Martin	22,394	40.7	−17.1
Economic Reform	Richard Blake	986	1.8	+1.8
Communist	Ted Tripp	382	0.7	+0.7
Total formal votes		54,989	97.5	
Informal votes		1,431	2.5	
Turnout		56,420	88.8	
Two-party-preferred result
Nationalist	Charles Marr		57.8	+15.6
Labor	Joseph Martin		42.2	−15.6
Nationalist gain from Labor		Swing	+15.6	

=== Elections in the 1920s ===
==== 1929 ====
1929 Australian federal election: Parkes
Party	Candidate	Votes	%	±%
Labor	Edward McTiernan	32,387	57.8	+15.2
Nationalist	Charles Marr	23,618	42.2	−15.2
Total formal votes		56,005	97.8	
Informal votes		1,268	2.2	
Turnout		57,273	95.5	
Labor gain from Nationalist		Swing	+15.2	

==== 1928 ====
1928 Australian federal election: Parkes
Party	Candidate	Votes	%	±%
Nationalist	Charles Marr	28,798	57.4	−5.4
Labor	George Sherringham	21,343	42.6	+5.4
Total formal votes		50,141	93.6	
Informal votes		2,627	6.4	
Turnout		52,768	93.5	
Nationalist hold		Swing	−5.4	

==== 1925 ====
1925 Australian federal election: Parkes
Party	Candidate	Votes	%	±%
Nationalist	Charles Marr	28,320	62.8	+1.0
Labor	William Dunn	16,808	37.2	−1.0
Total formal votes		45,128	98.3	
Informal votes		788	1.7	
Turnout		45,916	90.2	
Nationalist hold		Swing	+1.0	

==== 1922 ====
1922 Australian federal election: Parkes
Party	Candidate	Votes	%	±%
Nationalist	Charles Marr	12,970	61.8	+17.6
Labor	Edward Cohen	8,008	38.2	+0.1
Total formal votes		20,978	96.6	
Informal votes		737	3.4	
Turnout		21,715	50.1	
Nationalist hold		Swing	+1.7	

=== Elections in the 1910s ===
==== 1919 ====
1919 Australian federal election: Parkes
Party	Candidate	Votes	%	±%
Nationalist	Charles Marr	18,276	45.6	−19.8
Labor	Arthur Jones	13,807	34.4	−0.2
Ind. Nationalist	Bruce Smith	8,032	20.0	+20.0
Total formal votes		40,115	92.1	
Informal votes		3,437	7.9	
Turnout		43,552	66.0	
Two-party-preferred result
Nationalist	Charles Marr	25,512	63.6	−1.8
Labor	Arthur Jones	14,603	36.4	+1.8
Nationalist hold		Swing	−1.8	

==== 1917 ====
1917 Australian federal election: Parkes
Party	Candidate	Votes	%	±%
Nationalist	Bruce Smith	26,432	65.4	+6.9
Labor	Mark Gosling	13,982	34.6	−6.9
Total formal votes		40,414	96.9	
Informal votes		1,288	3.1	
Turnout		41,702	68.8	
Nationalist hold		Swing	+6.9	

==== 1914 ====
1914 Australian federal election: Parkes
Party	Candidate	Votes	%	±%
Liberal	Bruce Smith	19,259	58.5	−3.4
Labor	William Russell	13,676	41.5	+3.4
Total formal votes		32,935	97.9	
Informal votes		722	2.1	
Turnout		33,657	64.9	
Liberal hold		Swing	−3.4	

==== 1913 ====
1913 Australian federal election: Parkes
Party	Candidate	Votes	%	±%
Liberal	Bruce Smith	20,424	61.9	+18.0
Labor	William Russell	12,546	38.1	+1.4
Total formal votes		32,970	97.0	
Informal votes		1,006	3.0	
Turnout		33,976	75.7	
Liberal hold		Swing	+8.3	

==== 1910 ====
1910 Australian federal election: Parkes
Party	Candidate	Votes	%	±%
Liberal	Bruce Smith	11,342	45.0	−33.2
Labour	Ernest Burgess	8,776	34.8	+34.8
Independent Liberal	Herbert Pratten	5,009	20.2	+20.2
Total formal votes		25,217	99.0	
Informal votes		262	1.0	
Turnout		25,479	67.9	
Liberal hold		Swing	−23.1	

=== Elections in the 1900s ===
==== 1906 ====
1906 Australian federal election: Parkes
Party	Candidate	Votes	%	±%
Anti-Socialist	Bruce Smith	11,178	78.2	+4.3
Ind. Anti-Socialist	Hampton Slatyer	3,114	21.8	+21.8
Total formal votes		14,292	95.7	
Informal votes		647	4.3	
Turnout		14,939	49.6	
Anti-Socialist hold		Swing	+0.4	

==== 1903 ====
1903 Australian federal election: Parkes
Party	Candidate	Votes	%	±%
Free Trade	Bruce Smith	15,610	73.9	+0.8
Labour	Charles Dyer	3,876	18.4	+18.4
Ind. Free Trade	Varney Parkes	1,318	6.2	+6.2
Ind. Free Trade	Edward Beeby	216	1.0	+1.0
Ind. Free Trade	Hampton Slatyer	90	0.4	+0.4
Total formal votes		21,110	97.6	
Informal votes		513	2.4	
Turnout		21,623	58.7	
Free Trade hold		Swing	+2.6	

==== 1901 ====
1901 Australian federal election: Parkes
Party	Candidate	Votes	%	±%
Free Trade	Bruce Smith	7,321	73.1	+73.1
Protectionist	Robert Thomson	2,284	22.8	+22.8
Independent Labour	George Burns	413	4.1	+4.1
Total formal votes		10,018	98.2	
Informal votes		185	1.8	
Turnout		10,203	64.1	
Free Trade win		(new seat)		
