= Lyons Ministry =

Fraser Ministry may refer to:

- First Lyons Ministry
- Second Lyons Ministry
- Third Lyons Ministry
- Fourth Lyons Ministry
