= Second Lyons ministry =

21st ministry of government of Australia

- 21st Ministry of Australia

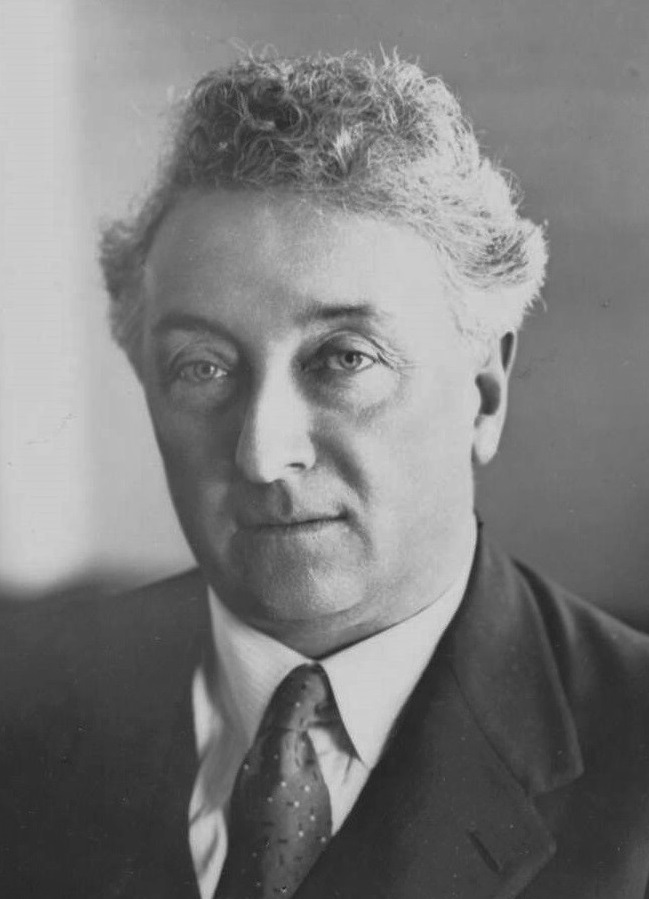
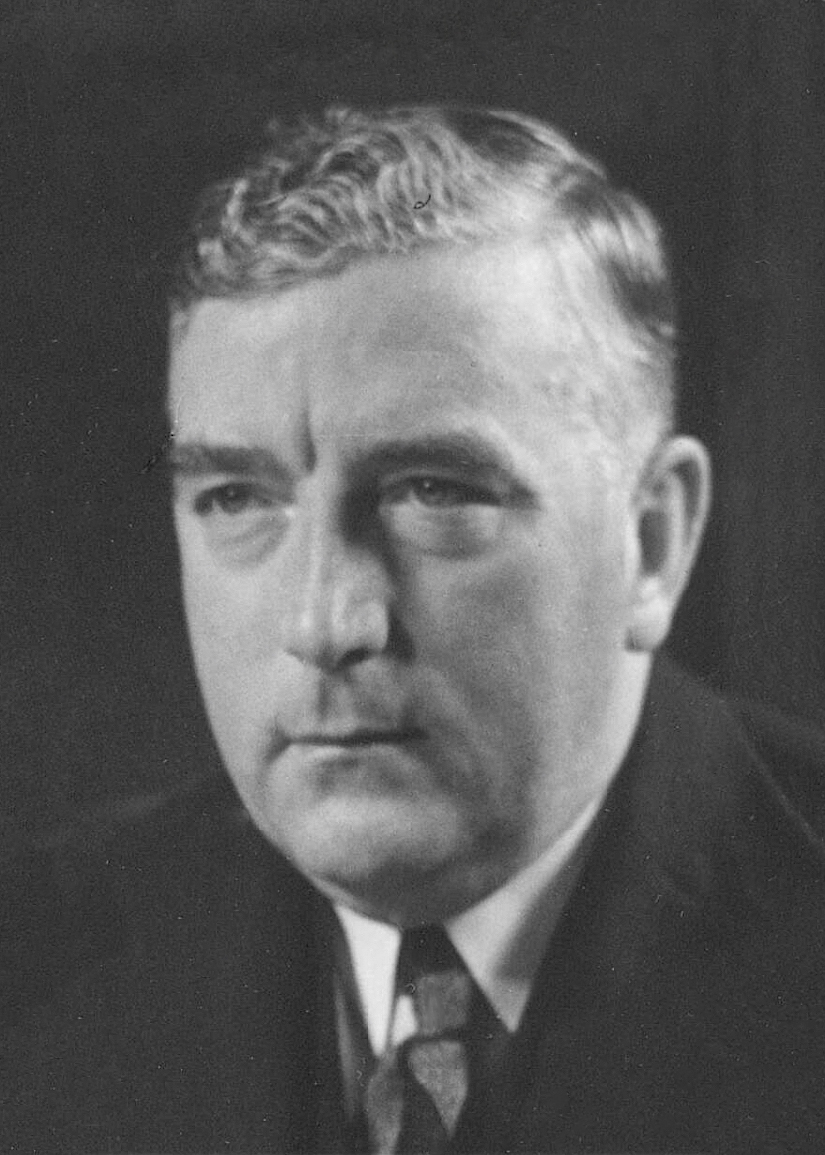
- Joseph Lyons Robert Menzies
- Date formed: 12 October 1934
- Date dissolved: 9 November 1934

People and organisations
- Monarch: George V
- Governor-General: Sir Isaac Isaacs
- Prime Minister: Joseph Lyons
- No. of ministers: 14
- Member party: United Australia
- Status in legislature: Minority government
- Opposition party: Labor
- Opposition leader: James Scullin

History
- Election: 15 September 1934
- Legislature term: 14th
- Predecessor: First Lyons ministry
- Successor: Third Lyons ministry

The Second Lyons ministry (United Australia) was the 21st ministry of the Government of Australia. It was led by the country's 10th Prime Minister, Joseph Lyons. The Second Lyons ministry succeeded the First Lyons ministry, which dissolved on 12 October 1934 following the federal election that took place in September. However, it was a minority government relying on support from the Country Party in order to remain in office. The ministry was replaced by the Third Lyons ministry on 9 November 1934 after Lyons entered into a formal Coalition with Earle Page and his Country Party; the second such coalition after that of the Bruce government.

Robert Menzies, who died in 1978, was the last surviving member of the Second Lyons ministry; Menzies was also the last surviving member of the Third Lyons ministry.

== Ministry ==
Party	Minister	Portrait	Portfolio
United Australia	Joseph Lyons (1879–1939) MP for Wilmot (1929–1939)		Prime Minister; Leader of the United Australia Party; Treasurer
United Australia	Robert Menzies (1894–1978) MP for Kooyong (1934–1966)		Attorney-General; Minister for Industry
United Australia	Sir George Pearce (1870–1952) Senator for Western Australia (1901–1938)		Minister for External Affairs; Minister in charge of Territories; Leader of the Government in the Senate
United Australia	Archdale Parkhill (1878–1947) MP for Warringah (1927–1937)		Minister for Defence
United Australia	Thomas White (1888–1957) MP for Balaclava (1929–1951)		Minister for Trade and Customs
United Australia	Frederick Stewart (1884–1961) MP for Parramatta (1931–1946)		Minister for Commerce
United Australia	Eric Harrison (1892–1974) MP for Wentworth (1931–1956)		Minister for the Interior
United Australia	Billy Hughes (1862–1952) MP for North Sydney (1922–1949)		Minister for Health; Minister for Repatriation; Vice-President of the Executive Council
United Australia	Alexander McLachlan (1872–1956) Senator for South Australia (1926–1944)		Postmaster-General; Minister in charge of Development and Scientific and Industrial Research
United Australia	Josiah Francis (1890–1964) MP for Moreton (1922–1955)		Minister in charge of War Service Homes; Minister assisting the Minister for Repatriation
United Australia	Richard Casey (1890–1976) MP for Corio (1931–1940)		Assistant Treasurer
United Australia	Charles Marr (1880–1960) MP for Parkes (1931–1943)		Minister without portfolio
United Australia	Sir Henry Gullett (1878–1940) MP for Henty (1925–1940)		Minister without portfolio
United Australia	Tom Brennan (1866–1944) Senator for Victoria (1931–1938)		Minister without portfolio
