= Third Lyons ministry =

22nd ministry of government of Australia

- 22nd Ministry of Australia

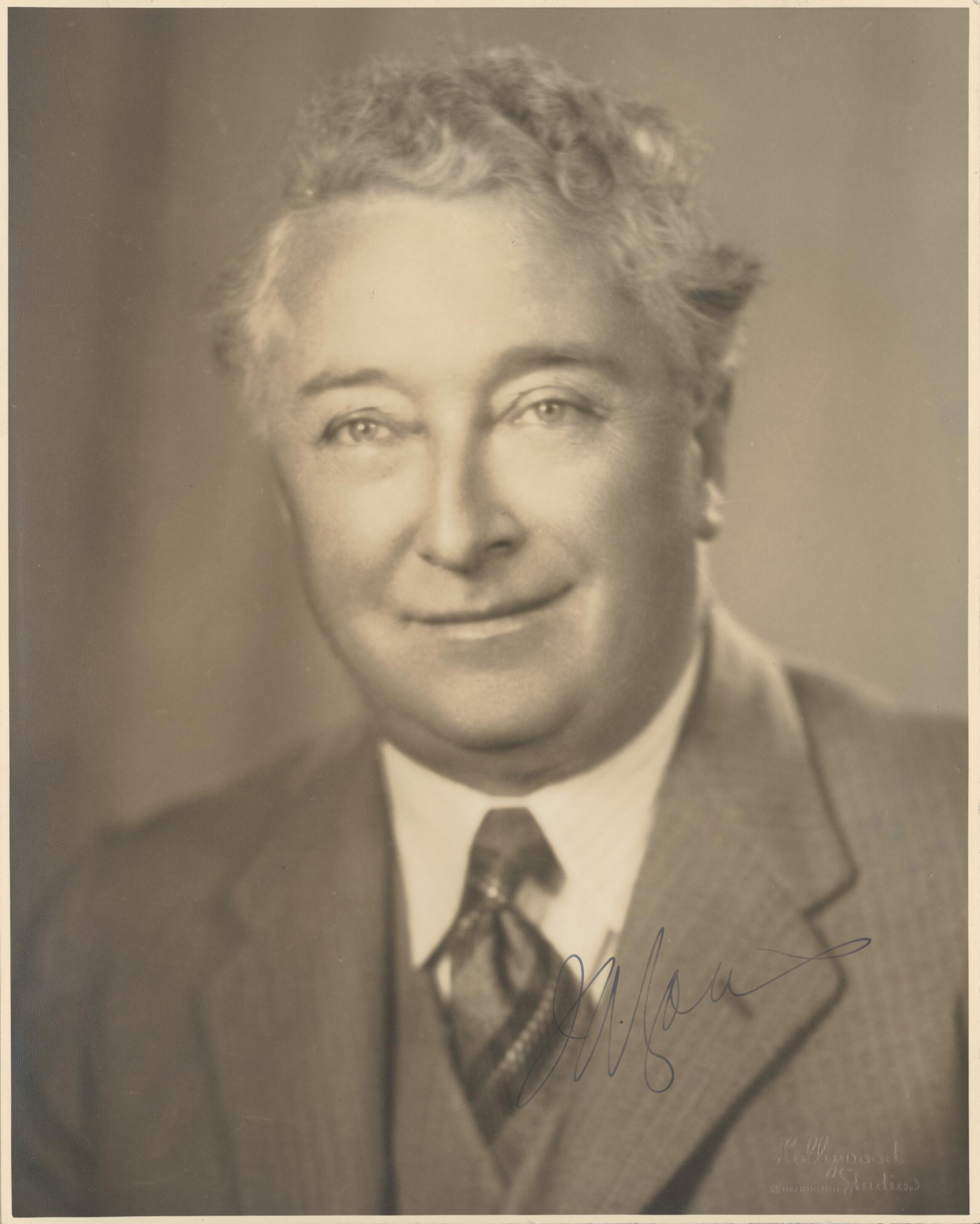
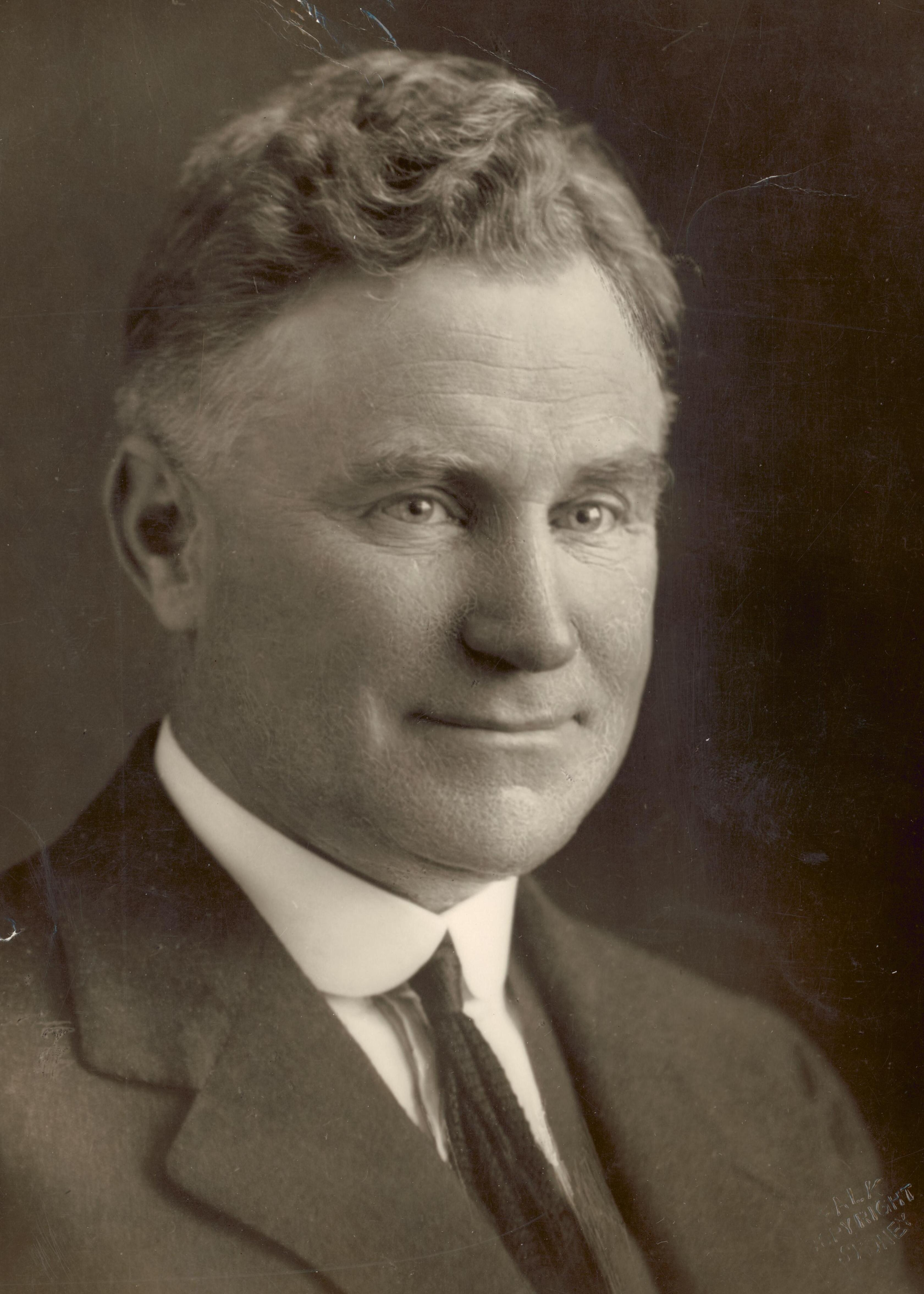
- Joseph Lyons Earle Page
- Date formed: 9 November 1934
- Date dissolved: 29 November 1937

People and organisations
- Monarch: George V Edward VIII; George VI
- Governor-General: Sir Isaac Isaacs; Lord Gowrie
- Prime Minister: Joseph Lyons
- No. of ministers: 15
- Member party: United Australia–Country coalition
- Status in legislature: Majority government
- Opposition party: Labor
- Opposition leader: James Scullin; John Curtin

History
- Outgoing election: 23 October 1937
- Legislature term: 14th
- Predecessor: Second Lyons ministry
- Successor: Fourth Lyons ministry

The Third Lyons ministry (United Australia–Country Coalition) was the 22nd ministry of the Government of Australia. It was led by the country's 10th Prime Minister, Joseph Lyons. The Third Lyons ministry succeeded the Second Lyons ministry, which dissolved on 9 November 1934 after Lyons entered into a formal Coalition with Earle Page and his Country Party; the second such coalition after that of the Bruce government. The ministry was replaced by the Fourth Lyons ministry on 29 November 1937 following the 1937 federal election.

Robert Menzies, who died in 1978, was the last surviving member of the Third Lyons ministry; Menzies was also the last surviving member of the Second Lyons ministry. Harold Thorby was the last surviving Country minister.

== Ministry ==
Party	Minister	Portrait	Portfolio
United Australia	Joseph Lyons (1879–1939) MP for Wilmot (1929–1939)		Prime Minister; Leader of the United Australia Party; Treasurer (to 3 October 1935); Vice-President of the Executive Council (from 8 November 1935); Minister for Health (from 8 November 1935 to 26 February 1936); Minister for Repatriation (from 8 November 1935 to 6 February 1936); Minister for Defence (from 20 November 1937)
Country	Earle Page (1880–1961) MP for Cowper (1919–1961)		Leader of the Country Party; Minister for Commerce
United Australia	Robert Menzies (1894–1978) MP for Kooyong (1934–1966)		Deputy Leader of the United Australia Party (from 5 December 1935); Attorney-General; Minister for Industry
United Australia	Sir George Pearce (1870–1952) Senator for Western Australia (1901–1938)		Minister for External Affairs; Minister in charge of Territories; Leader of the Government in the Senate
United Australia	Archdale Parkhill (1878–1947) MP for Warringah (1927–1937)		Minister for Defence (to 20 November 1937)
Country	Thomas Paterson (1882–1952) MP for Gippsland (1922–1943)		Deputy Leader of the Country Party (to 27 November 1937); Minister for the Interior
United Australia	Alexander McLachlan (1872–1956) Senator for South Australia (1926–1944)		Postmaster-General; Minister in charge of Development and Scientific and Industrial Research
United Australia	Thomas White DFC VD (1888–1957) MP for Balaclava (1929–1951)		Minister for Trade and Customs
United Australia	Richard Casey (1890–1976) MP for Corio (1931–1940)		Assistant Treasurer (to 3 October 1935); Treasurer (from 3 October 1935)
United Australia	Billy Hughes (1862–1952) MP for North Sydney (1922–1949)		Vice-President of the Executive Council (to 6 November 1935); Minister for Health (to 6 November 1935; from 26 February 1936); Minister for Repatriation (to 6 November 1935; from 6 February 1936)
United Australia	Charles Marr (1880–1960) MP for Parkes (1931–1943)		Minister without portfolio (to 31 December 1934)
United Australia	Sir Henry Gullett (1878–1940) MP for Henty (1925–1940)		Minister without portfolio directing negotiations for trade treaties (to 11 March 1937)
United Australia	Tom Brennan (1866–1944) Senator for Victoria (1931–1938)		Minister without portfolio assisting the Minister for Industry; Minister without portfolio assisting the Minister for Commerce
Country	Harold Thorby (1888–1973) MP for Calare (1931–1940)		Deputy Leader of the Country Party (from 27 November 1937); Minister without portfolio assisting the Minister for Repatriation (to 1 September 1935); Minister without portfolio in charge of War Service Homes (to 11 September 1936); Minister without portfolio assisting the Minister for Commerce (from 1 September 1935)
Country	James Hunter (1882–1968) MP for Maranoa (1921–1940)		Minister without portfolio representing the Postmaster-General in the House of Representatives (to 11 September 1935); Minister without portfolio assisting the Minister for Repatriation (from 1 September 1935); Minister without portfolio assisting the Minister for the Interior (from 23 September 1935); Minister without portfolio in charge of War Service Homes (from 11 September 1936); Minister without portfolio assisting the Minister for Commerce (from 18 March 1937 to 25 July 1937)
