= Page ministry =

24th ministry of government of Australia

- 24th Ministry of Australia

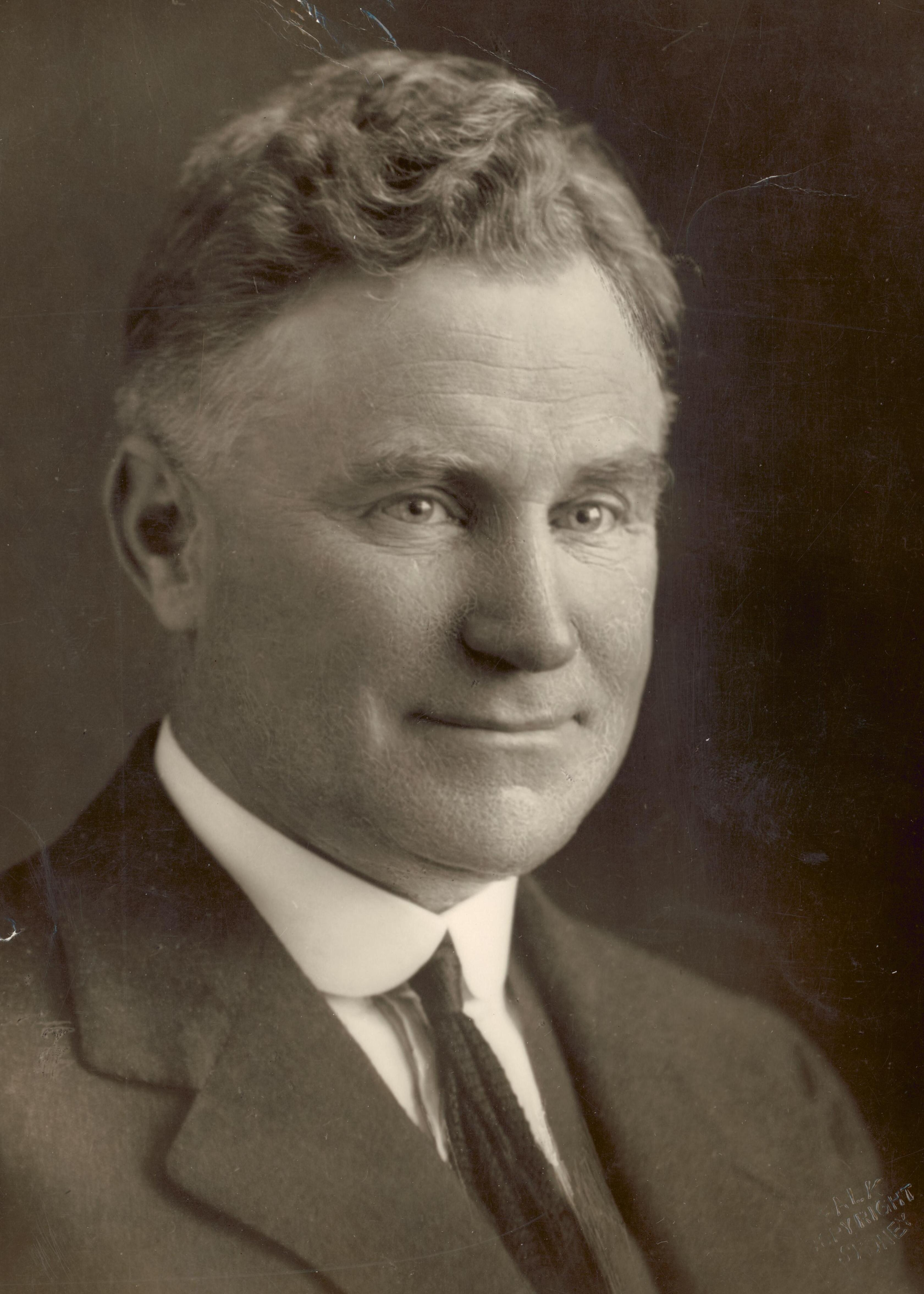
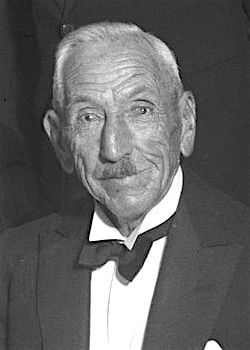
- Earle Page Billy Hughes
- Date formed: 7 April 1939
- Date dissolved: 26 April 1939

People and organisations
- Monarch: George VI
- Governor-General: Lord Gowrie
- Prime Minister: Sir Earle Page
- No. of ministers: 13
- Member party: Country–United Australia coalition
- Status in legislature: Majority government
- Opposition party: Labor
- Opposition leader: John Curtin

History
- Legislature term: 15th
- Predecessor: Fourth Lyons ministry
- Successor: First Menzies ministry

The Page ministry (Country–United Australia Coalition) was the 24th ministry of the Government of Australia. It was led by the country's 11th Prime Minister, Sir Earle Page. The Page ministry succeeded the Fourth Lyons ministry, which dissolved on 7 April 1939 following the death of former prime minister Joseph Lyons – the first of three occasions where a prime minister died in office. Since Page was the head of the Country Party, it was a caretaker ministry until the senior partner in the Coalition, the United Australia Party, could elect a new leader. Former Attorney-General Robert Menzies was ultimately elected on 18 April 1939. However, due to the Country Party withdrawing from the Coalition after relations between Page and Menzies broke down, Menzies along with his ministry was not sworn in until 26 April 1939.

John McEwen, who died in 1980, was the last surviving member of the Page ministry; McEwen was also the last surviving member of the Fourth Lyons ministry. Robert Menzies was the last surviving UAP minister.

== Ministry ==
Party	Minister	Portrait	Portfolio
Country	Sir Earle Page (1880–1961) MP for Cowper (1919–1961)		Prime Minister; Leader of the Country Party; Minister for Commerce
United Australia	Billy Hughes (1862–1952) MP for North Sydney (1922–1949)		Minister for External Affairs; Attorney-General; Minister for Industry
United Australia	Richard Casey (1890–1976) MP for Corio (1931–1940)		Treasurer
Country	Harold Thorby (1888–1973) MP for Calare (1931–1940)		Deputy Leader of the Country Party; Minister for Works; Minister for Civil Aviation
United Australia	John Perkins (1878–1954) MP for Eden-Monaro (1931–1943)		Minister for Trade and Customs
United Australia	Geoffrey Street (1894–1940) MP for Corangamite (1934–1940)		Minister for Defence
Country	John McEwen (1900–1980) MP for Indi (1937–1949)		Minister for the Interior
United Australia	George McLeay (1892–1955) Senator for South Australia (1935–1947)		Vice-President of the Executive Council; Leader of the Government in the Senate
United Australia	Harry Foll (1890–1977) Senator for Queensland (1917–1947)		Minister for Health; Minister for Repatriation
Country	Archie Cameron (1895–1956) MP for Barker (1934–1956)		Postmaster-General
United Australia	Eric Harrison (1892–1974) MP for Wentworth (1931–1956)		Minister without portfolio administering external territories; Minister without portfolio assisting the Prime Minister
United Australia	Allan MacDonald (1892–1978) Senator for Western Australia (1935–1947)		Minister without portfolio assisting the Treasurer
Country	Victor Thompson (1885–1968) MP for New England (1922–1940)		Minister without portfolio assisting the Minister for Commerce
