= First Lyons ministry =

20th ministry of the government of Australia

- 20th Ministry of Australia

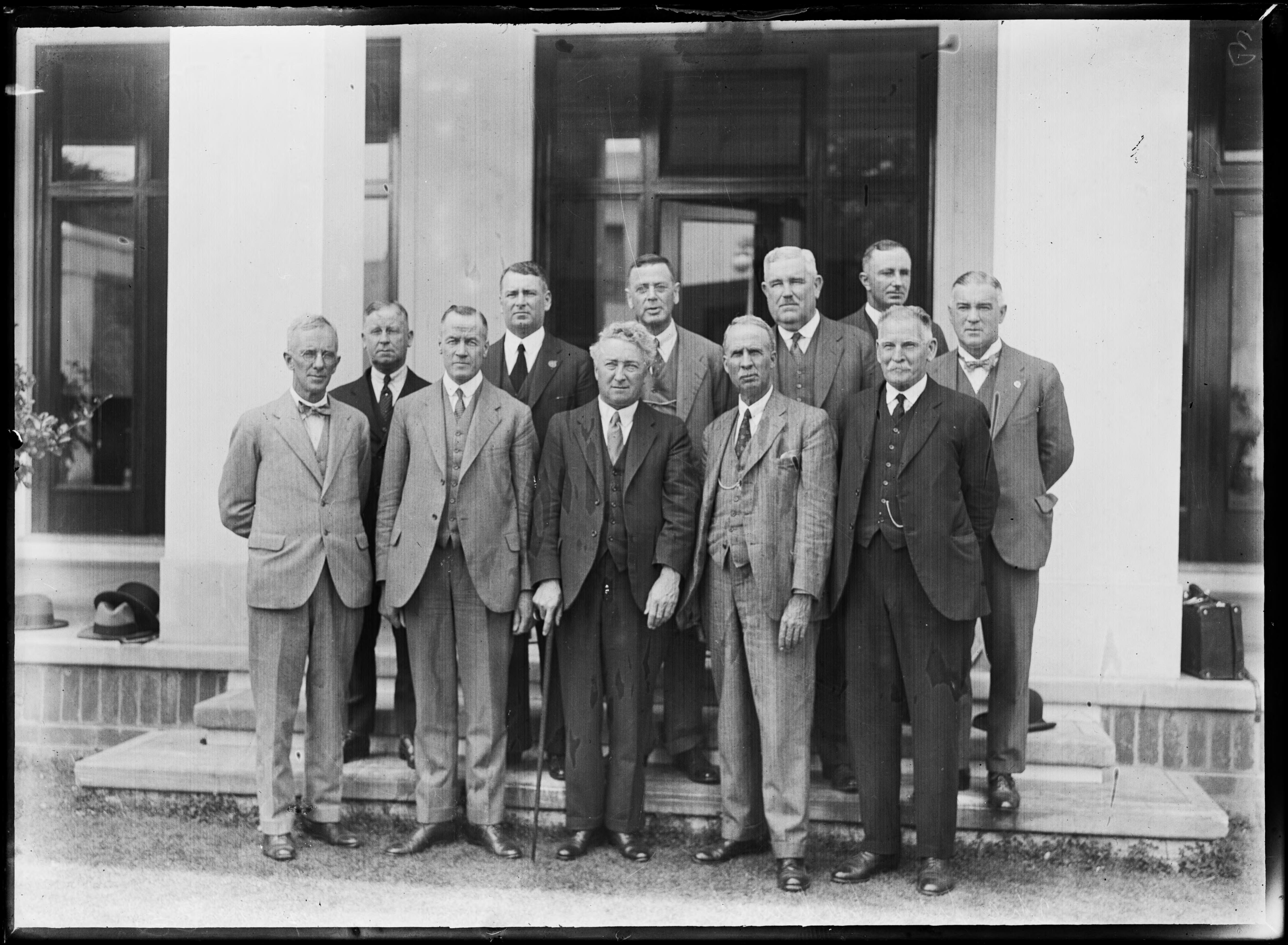
- Group photo of the First Lyons ministry
- Date formed: 6 January 1932
- Date dissolved: 12 October 1934

People and organisations
- Monarch: George V
- Governor-General: Sir Isaac Isaacs
- Prime Minister: Joseph Lyons
- No. of ministers: 18
- Member party: United Australia
- Status in legislature: Majority government
- Opposition party: Labor
- Opposition leader: James Scullin

History
- Election: 19 December 1931
- Outgoing election: 15 September 1934
- Legislature term: 13th
- Predecessor: Scullin ministry
- Successor: Second Lyons ministry

The First Lyons ministry (United Australia) was the 20th ministry of the Government of Australia. It was led by the country's 10th Prime Minister, Joseph Lyons. The First Lyons ministry succeeded the Scullin ministry, which dissolved on 6 January 1932 following the federal election that took place on 19 December which saw the UAP defeat James Scullin's Labor Party. The ministry was replaced by the Second Lyons ministry on 12 October 1934 following the 1934 federal election.

Allan Guy, who died in 1979, was the last surviving Assistant Minister of the First Lyons ministry. John Latham was the last surviving Cabinet minister.

== Ministry ==
Party	Minister	Portrait	Portfolio
United Australia	Joseph Lyons (1879–1939) MP for Wilmot (1929–1939)		Prime Minister; Leader of the United Australia Party; Treasurer; Minister for Commerce (from 3 October 1932 to 13 October 1932)
United Australia	John Latham (1877–1964) MP for Kooyong (1922–1934)		Deputy Leader of the United Australia Party (to 15 September 1934); Attorney-General; Minister for External Affairs; Minister for Industry
United Australia	Sir George Pearce (1870–1952) Senator for Western Australia (1901–1938)		Minister for Defence; Leader of the Government in the Senate
United Australia	Archdale Parkhill (1878–1947) MP for Warringah (1927–1937)		Minister for Transport (to 12 April 1932); Minister for Home Affairs (to 12 April 1932); Minister for the Interior (from 12 April 1932 to 13 October 1932); Postmaster-General (from 13 October 1932)
United Australia	Henry Gullett (1878–1940) MP for Henty (1925–1940)		Minister for Trade and Customs (to 14 January 1933)
United Australia	Charles Marr (1880–1960) MP for Parkes (1931–1943)		Minister for Health; Minister for Works and Railways (to 12 April 1932); Minister in charge of Territories (to 24 May 1934); Minister for Repatriation (from 12 April 1932)
United Australia	Charles Hawker (1894–1938) MP for Wakefield (1929–1938)		Minister for Repatriation (to 12 April 1932); Minister for Markets (to 13 April 1932); Minister for Commerce (from 13 April 1932 to 23 September 1932)
United Australia	Alexander McLachlan (1872–1956) Senator for South Australia (1926–1944)		Vice-President of the Executive Council; Minister in charge of Development and Scientific and Industrial Research
United Australia	Josiah Francis (1890–1964) MP for Moreton (1922–1955)		Minister in charge of War Service Homes; Assistant Minister for Defence
United Australia	James Fenton (1864–1950) MP for Maribyrnong (1910–1934)		Postmaster-General (to 13 October 1932)
United Australia	John Perkins (1878–1954) MP for Eden-Monaro (1931–1943) (in Ministry from 13 October 1932)		Assistant Minister for Trade and Customs (to 13 October 1932); Minister for the Interior (from 13 October 1932)
United Australia	Frederick Stewart (1884–1961) MP for Parramatta (1931–1946) (in Ministry from 13 October 1932)		Minister for Commerce (from 13 October 1932)
United Australia	Thomas White (1888–1957) MP for Balaclava (1929–1951) (in Ministry from 14 January 1933)		Minister for Trade and Customs (from 14 January 1933)
United Australia	Sir Harry Lawson (1875–1952) Senator for Victoria (1929–1935) (in Ministry from 24 May 1934)		Assistant Minister (Treasury) (from 17 October 1933 to 24 May 1934); Minister in charge of Territories (from 24 May 1934)

== Assistant ministers ==
Party	Minister	Portrait	Portfolio
United Australia	Stanley Bruce (1883–1967) MP for Flinders (1931–1933)		Assistant Treasurer (to 29 June 1932); Minister without portfolio (from 29 June 1932 to 26 September 1932); Minister without portfolio, London (from 26 September 1932 to 6 October 1933)
United Australia	Sir Walter Massy-Greene (1874–1952) Senator for New South Wales (1926–1938)		Minister assisting the Leader of the Government in the Senate (to 23 June 1932); Assistant Minister (Treasury) (to 25 September 1933)
United Australia	Allan Guy (1890–1979) MP for Bass (1929–1934)		Assistant Minister for Trade and Customs (from 13 October 1932)
United Australia	Richard Casey (1890–1976) MP for Corio (1931–1940)		Assistant Minister (Treasury) (from 25 September 1933)
