= Fourth Lyons ministry =

23rd ministry of government of Australia

- 23rd Ministry of Australia

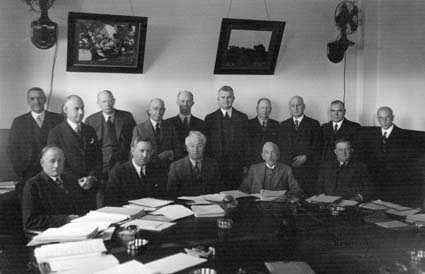
- Group photo of the Fourth Lyons ministry
- Date formed: 29 November 1937
- Date dissolved: 7 April 1939

People and organisations
- Monarch: George VI
- Governor-General: Lord Gowrie
- Prime Minister: Joseph Lyons
- No. of ministers: 17
- Member party: United Australia–Country coalition
- Status in legislature: Majority government
- Opposition party: Labor
- Opposition leader: John Curtin

History
- Election: 23 October 1937
- Legislature term: 15th
- Predecessor: Third Lyons ministry
- Successor: Page ministry

The Fourth Lyons ministry (United Australia–Country Coalition) was the 23rd ministry of the Government of Australia. It was led by the country's 10th Prime Minister, Joseph Lyons. The Fourth Lyons ministry succeeded the Third Lyons ministry, which dissolved on 29 November 1937 following the federal election that took place in October. The ministry was replaced by the Page ministry on 7 April 1939, following the death of Lyons — the first of three occasions on which a prime minister had died in office.

John McEwen, who died in 1980, was the last surviving member of the Fourth Lyons ministry; McEwen was also the last surviving member of the Page ministry. Robert Menzies was the last surviving UAP minister.

== Ministry ==
Party	Minister	Portrait	Portfolio
United Australia	Joseph Lyons (1879–1939) MP for Wilmot (1929–1939)		Prime Minister; Leader of the United Australia Party
Country	Sir Earle Page (1880–1961) MP for Cowper (1919–1961)		Leader of the Country Party; Minister for Commerce; Minister for Health (to 7 November 1938)
United Australia	Robert Menzies (1894–1978) MP for Kooyong (1934–1966)		Deputy Leader of the United Australia Party (to 20 March 1939); Attorney-General (to 20 March 1939); Minister for Industry (to 20 March 1939)
United Australia	Alexander McLachlan (1872–1956) Senator for South Australia (1926–1944)		Postmaster-General (to 7 November 1938); Leader of the Government in the Senate (to 7 November 1938)
United Australia	Thomas White (1888–1957) MP for Balaclava (1929–1951)		Minister for Trade and Customs (to 8 November 1938)
United Australia	Richard Casey (1890–1976) MP for Corio (1931–1940)		Treasurer; Minister in charge of Development and Scientific and Industrial Research (to 7 November 1938)
United Australia	Billy Hughes (1862–1952) MP for North Sydney (1922–1949)		Minister for External Affairs; Vice-President of the Executive Council (to 7 November 1938); Minister in charge of Territories (to 7 November 1938); Attorney-General (from 20 March 1939); Minister for Industry (from 20 March 1939)
Country	Harold Thorby (1888–1973) MP for Calare (1931–1940)		Deputy Leader of the Country Party; Minister for Defence (to 7 November 1938); Minister for Works (from 7 November 1938); Minister for Civil Aviation (from 7 November 1938)
United Australia	Harry Foll (1890–1977) Senator for Queensland (1917–1947)		Minister in charge of War Service Homes (to 7 November 1938); Minister for Repatriation (from 7 November 1938); Minister for Health (from 7 November 1938)
Country	John McEwen (1900–1980) MP for Indi (1937–1949)		Minister for the Interior
Country	Archie Cameron (1895–1956) MP for Barker (1934–1956)		Minister without portfolio assisting the Minister for Commerce (to 7 November 1938); Postmaster-General (from 7 November 1938)
Country	Victor Thompson (1885–1968) MP for New England (1922–1940)		Minister without portfolio assisting the Minister for Commerce
United Australia	Allan MacDonald (1892–1978) Senator for Western Australia (1935–1947)		Minister without portfolio assisting the Minister for Commerce (to 7 November 1938); Minister without portfolio assisting the Treasurer (from 7 November 1938)
United Australia	George McLeay (1892–1955) Senator for South Australia (1935–1947) (in Ministry from 7 November 1938)		Chief Government Whip in the Senate (to 29 November 1937); Vice-President of the Executive Council (from 7 November 1938); Leader of the Government in the Senate (from 7 November 1938)
United Australia	Geoffrey Street (1894–1940) MP for Corangamite (1934–1940) (in Ministry from 7 November 1938)		Minister for Defence (from 7 November 1938)
United Australia	John Perkins (1878–1954) MP for Eden-Monaro (1931–1943) (in Ministry from 7 November 1938)		Minister without portfolio administering external territories (from 7 November 1938 to 8 November 1938); Minister without portfolio assisting the Prime Minister (from 7 November 1938 to 8 November 1938); Minister for Trade and Customs (from 8 November 1938)
United Australia	Eric Harrison (1892–1974) MP for Wentworth (1931–1956) (in Ministry from 8 November 1938)		Minister without portfolio administering external territories (from 8 November 1938); Minister without portfolio assisting the Prime Minister (from 8 November 1938)
