= 1931 Parkes by-election =

Australian federal by-election

31 January 1931
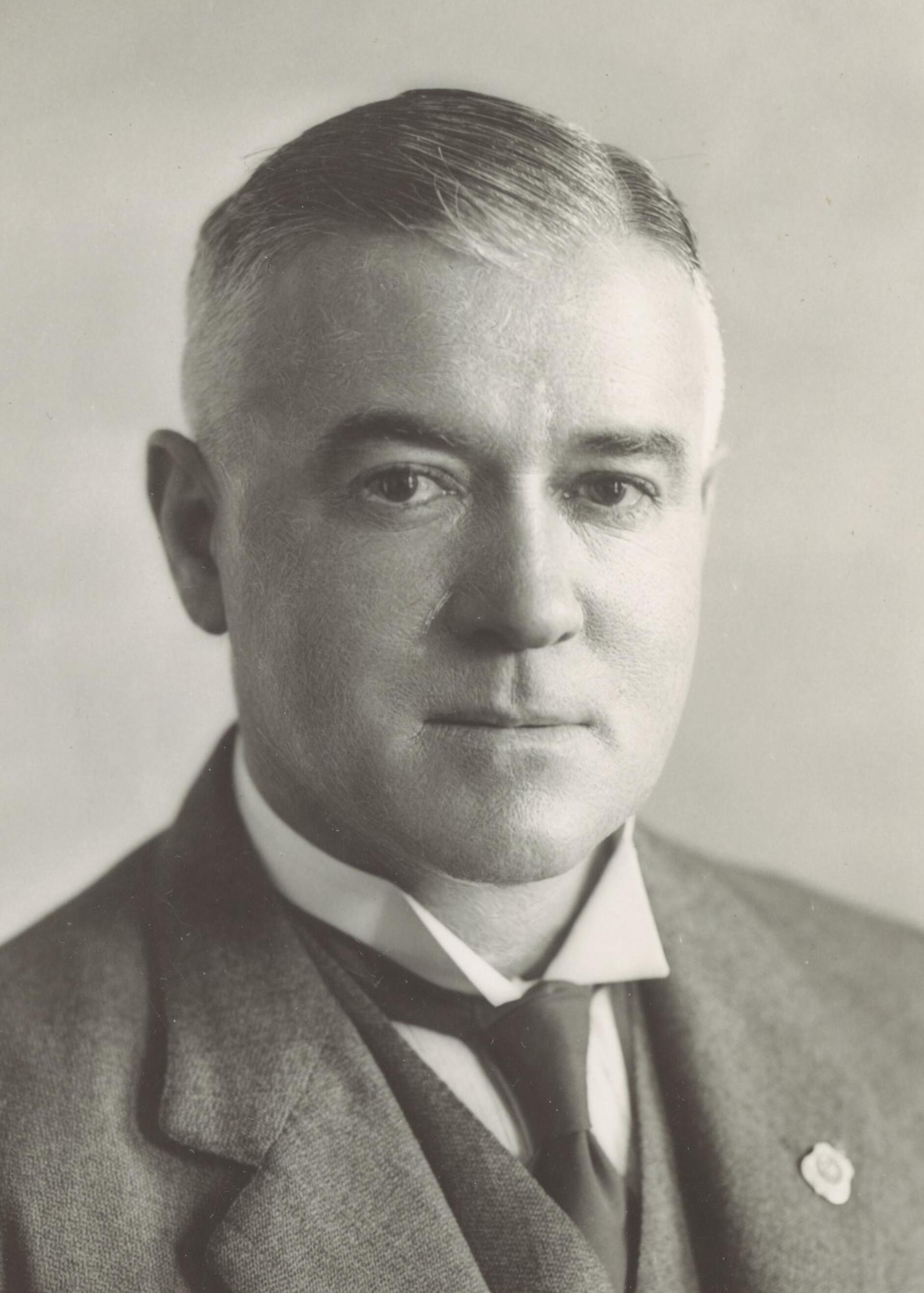
	First party	Second party
		ALP
Candidate	Charles Marr	Joseph Martin
Party	Nationalist	Labor
Popular vote	31,227	22,394
Percentage	56.8%	40.7%
Swing	▲14.6pp	▼17.1pp
TPP	57.8%	42.2%
TPP swing	▲15.6pp	▼42.2pp
MP before election
Edward McTiernan
Labor
Elected MP
Charles Marr
Nationalist

A by-election was held for the Australian House of Representatives seat of Parkes on 31 January 1931. This was triggered by the resignation of Labor MP Edward McTiernan to take a seat on the High Court.

The by-election was won by Nationalist candidate Charles Marr, who had represented the seat from 1919 until his defeat by McTiernan in 1929.

This was the first time the Communist Party endorsed a candidate at federal level.

== Results ==
Parkes by-election, 1931
Party	Candidate	Votes	%	±%
Nationalist	Charles Marr	31,227	56.8	+14.6
Labor	Joseph Martin	22,394	40.7	−17.1
Economic Reform	Richard Blake	986	1.8	+1.8
Communist	Ted Tripp	382	0.7	+0.7
Total formal votes		54,989	97.5	
Informal votes		1,431	2.5	
Turnout		56,420	88.8	
Two-party-preferred result
Nationalist	Charles Marr		57.8	+15.6
Labor	Joseph Martin		42.2	−15.6
Nationalist gain from Labor		Swing	+15.6	
