= Ted Tripp =

British-Australian political activist

Edward Clavell Tripp
- Born: 25 September 1900; Acton, London
- Disappeared: 21 September 1979
- Organization: Australian Workers' Union
- Political party: Communist Party of Australia

Edward Clavell Tripp (25 September 1900 – 21 September 1979) was an English-born Australian political organiser and communist.

Tripp was born at Acton in London to cigar merchant Clavell John Francis Tripp and Violet Mary, née Vinall. He attended boarding school and, despite taking the University of Cambridge entrance examination, became an apprentice to an engineer. He worked for the Metropolitan Railways in London during World War I and became politically radicalised by the 1917 Russian Revolution. In 1924 Tripp moved to Western Australia and then to Townsville, where he worked on the government railways and joined the Australian Workers' Union and the Communist Party of Australia. In 1929 he ran for the Legislative Assembly of Queensland as an Independent Communist candidate for Mundingburra. He visited Britain, Germany and Moscow later in 1929 and leaned towards Trotskyism, returning to Australia by mid-1930.

In 1931 Tripp was a candidate for the 1931 by-election for the House of Representatives seat of Parkes, making him the first endorsed Communist to stand for federal parliament. At the federal election later that year he contested Darling and in 1932 ran for the New South Wales Legislative Assembly seat of King. Despite being president of the Friends of the Soviet Union from 1930 to 1933, he lost favour with the Communist Party and was expelled in 1934, joining the Sydney Trotskyists, a local branch of the Workers' Party of Australia. He became secretary of the Workers' Party in 1935 and edited the organisations journal, the Militant. He fell out with his new party in 1937 and led the League for Revolutionary Democracy (Independent Communist League), a rival group.

Tripp moved to Melbourne in 1938 and on 30 July married Ruby May Bullock at Carlton. He worked as a fitter in a munitions factory at Footscray until 1965 but continued his involvement in the radical unionist movement, being appointed tutor at the Victorian Labor College in 1945 and becoming the college's secretary in 1956. In a largely symbolic gesture he joined the Socialist Workers' Party in 1978. He died at Footscray in 1979.
