= Les Haylen =

Australian politician

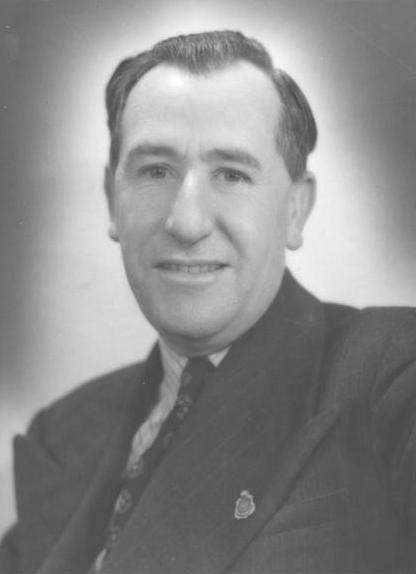

Member of the Australian Parliament for Parkes
- In office 21 August 1943 – 30 November 1963
- Preceded by: Charles Marr
- Succeeded by: Tom Hughes

Personal details
- Born: 23 September 1898 Gundaroo, Colony of New South Wales
- Died: 12 September 1977 (aged 78) Lewisham, New South Wales, Australia
- Party: Australian Labor Party
- Spouse: Sylvia Myrtle Rogers
- Occupation: Journalist

Leslie Clement "Les" Haylen (23 September 1898 – 12 September 1977), also known by the pen-name Sutton Woodfield, was an Australian politician, playwright, novelist and journalist.

== Early life ==
Haylen was born on 23 September 1898 at Gundaroo, near Queanbeyan, to Irish maintenance worker Thomas Haylen and Catherine, née Day. He was the youngest of twelve children; the family moved to Sydney in 1908. Haylen was raised as a Catholic, but later lost his faith. Among his childhood influences were his literature-loving grandfather William Henry Day, and family friend Mary Gilmore.

Haylen enlisted in the Australian Imperial Force on 6 July 1918 and was sent to Europe, but his ship was recalled and he was discharged in January of the following year. Re-enlisting in June 1919, he escorted prisoners of war being repatriated to Germany on the passenger ferry Trás-os-Montes. On his return to Sydney in November, he became a journalist with The Sunday Times. On 30 April 1927 he married shop-assistant Sylvia Myrtle Rogers at Chancery Square.

== Journalism ==
The couple moved to Wagga Wagga, where Haylen became chief sub-editor and leader writer of The Daily Advertiser. His first play, the anti-war Two Minutes' Silence, was first staged in 1930; it received positive reviews and ran in Sydney for twenty-six weeks. A film based on the play was produced in 1933. Returning to Sydney in 1933, Haylen became news editor of The Australian Women's Weekly.

In 1942, he sought Australian Labor Party (ALP) pre-selection for the seat of Parkes in the Australian House of Representatives. As a consequence, his contract with Consolidated Press Ltd was terminated by its owner, Frank Packer, and Haylen then became editor of the official newspaper of the ALP, the Standard. He scored an unexpected victory in the 1943 federal election over the long-standing member Sir Charles Marr, attracting 52.9% of the two-party-preferred vote.

== Federal politics ==
Haylen was a committed socialist and read widely on the subject. In parliament in particular, he was renowned for his wit and irreverence. Generally bored by parish pump politics, he once described formal occasions in his electorate as "fetes worse than death". His chief interests were in foreign affairs, economics and the arts. In 1944 he was the publicity director for the 1944 referendum, and in 1945 he was appointed chairman of the Commonwealth Immigration Advisory Committee. The 1946 report of that committee formed the basis for Australia's post-war immigration program.

Haylen was overlooked for a cabinet post after the 1946 elections, but led a parliamentary delegation to Japan in 1948, where he sparked controversy by shaking hands with Emperor Hirohito. That same year he visited China to arrange the migration to Australia of Europeans from Shanghai, and in 1957, when in opposition, he once again visited China, with a Labor Party delegation. Haylen's 1959 publication Chinese Journey expressed his support for the changes enacted by the communists in China. He was also a member of a 1963 parliamentary delegation to Southeast Asia.

Haylen was always a supporter of his parliamentary leaders Ben Chifley, H.V. Evatt and Arthur Calwell, and unsuccessfully stood for the deputy-leadership of the party in 1960. He was surprisingly defeated in the 1963 elections, but continued writing. He was unsuccessful in his attempts to enter the Senate in 1964 or to achieve pre-selection again for Parkes in 1965. Haylen's memoirs Twenty Years' Hard Labor were published in 1969, revealing his disillusionment with parliament and aspects of the ALP, especially its right wing. A reviewer noted that Haylen was "not of the old school of Labor [but] neither was he of the new".

Haylen died on 12 September 1977 at Lewisham in Sydney, and was survived by his wife and two sons.

== Works ==
=== Plays ===
- Two Minutes Silence (1930)
- Change of Policy (1934)
- Freedom has a Beard (1937)
- Blood on the Wattle (1948)
- The Stormy Blast (1966)

=== Novels ===
- The Game Darrells (1933)
- The Brierley Rose (1935)
- Brown Boy Singing (1940)
- A for Artemis (1960), as Sutton Woodfield
- Big Red (1965)

=== Other works ===
- Chinese Journey (1959)
- The Tracks We Travel (1965, 1976), editor
- Twenty Years' Hard Labor (1969)

Parliament of Australia
Preceded by Charles Marr	Member for Parkes; 1943–1963	Succeeded by Tom Hughes
