= Tom Hughes (Australian politician) =

Australian politician (1923–2024)

The Honourable Tom Hughes AO KC
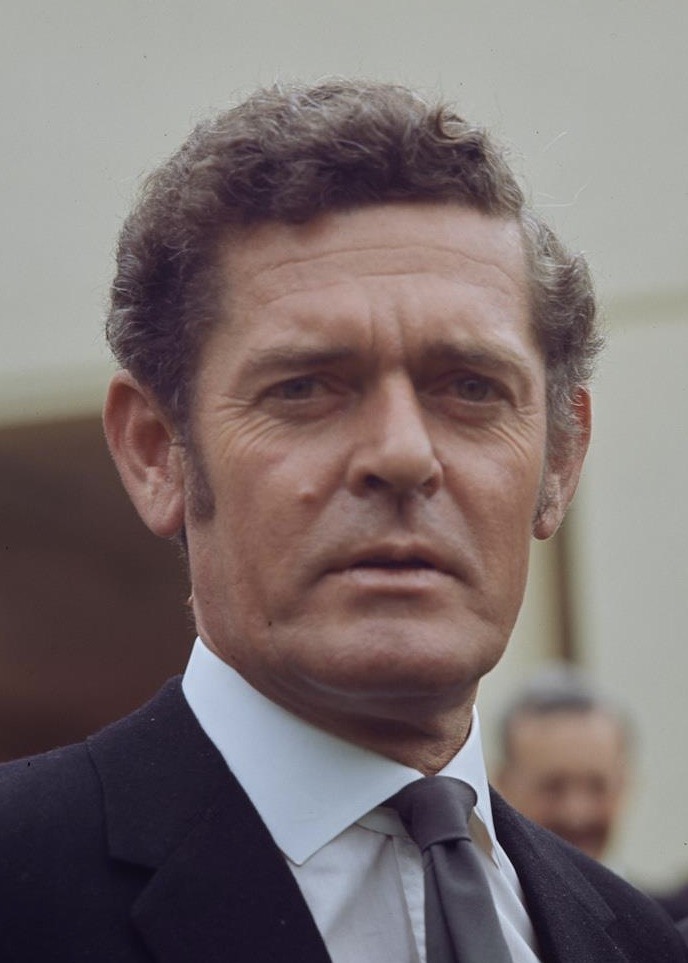
- Hughes in 1969

Attorney-General of Australia
- In office 12 November 1969 – 22 March 1971
- Prime Minister: John Gorton; William McMahon
- Preceded by: Nigel Bowen
- Succeeded by: Nigel Bowen

Member of the Australian Parliament for Parkes
- In office 30 November 1963 – 25 October 1969
- Preceded by: Les Haylen
- Succeeded by: Division abolished

Member of the Australian Parliament for Berowra
- In office 25 October 1969 – 2 November 1972
- Preceded by: Division created
- Succeeded by: Harry Edwards

Personal details
- Born: Thomas Eyre Forrest Hughes; 26 November 1923 Rose Bay, New South Wales, Australia
- Died: 28 November 2024 (aged 101) Rose Bay, New South Wales, Australia
- Party: Liberal
- Spouses: Joanna Fitzgerald (m. 1951; div. 1972); Christine Abel Smith (m. 1981)
- Children: 3, including Lucy
- Parents: Geoffrey Forrest Hughes; Margaret Vidal
- Relatives: Thomas Hughes (grandfather); Robert Hughes (brother); Malcolm Turnbull (son-in-law); See Hughes-Turnbull family
- Education: University of Sydney
- Occupation: Lawyer; politician

Thomas Eyre Forrest Hughes AO KC (26 November 1923 – 28 November 2024) was an Australian barrister and politician. A member of the Liberal Party, he served as Attorney-General in the Gorton government from 1969 to 1971, and was a member of the House of Representatives from 1963 to 1972, representing the New South Wales seats of Parkes and Berowra. He was a president of the New South Wales Bar Association and was one of Sydney's most prominent barristers for a number of decades. Hughes was the last surviving Liberal minister of the Gorton and McMahon governments.

== Early life and education ==
Hughes was born on 26 November 1923 in Rose Bay, New South Wales. He was one of four children born to lawyer and aviator Geoffrey Forrest Hughes and his wife Margaret Eyre Sealy (née Vidal). His brother was the writer and critic Robert Hughes, while his grandfather Thomas Hughes and great-uncle John Hughes were members of the New South Wales Legislative Council.

Hughes was educated at Saint Ignatius' College, Riverview, and the University of Sydney, where he graduated in law. He enlisted in the Royal Australian Air Force in May 1942 and was trained as a pilot. In December 1943, he began a tour of operations with 10 Squadron RAAF as second pilot of a crew flying Short Sunderland flying boats, becoming a first pilot in his crew just prior to Invasion of Normandy, and then in January 1945 captain of his own Sunderland crew. He was discharged in February 1946. In 2005, he was awarded the French Légion d'honneur for his contribution to Operation Overlord. He was called to the New South Wales bar in 1949, becoming a Queen's Counsel (QC) in 1962.

Hughes appeared in a number of high-profile defamation cases. In 1960, he successfully defended Australian Consolidated Press, its editor-in-chief David McNicoll, and political journalist Alan Reid against a suit brought by union secretary Charlie Oliver. In 1964 he represented author Hal Porter against The Mercury for publishing a bad review of his autobiography.

== Politics ==
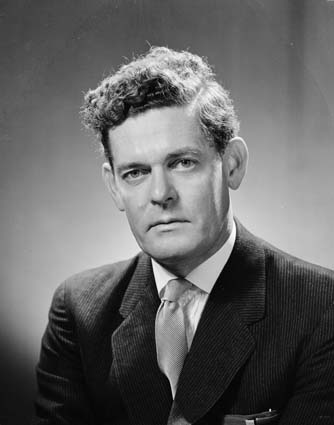
Hughes in 1964

Hughes defeated the long-serving Labor member Les Haylen to unexpectedly win the seat of Parkes at the 1963 election. He switched to the Division of Berowra at the 1969 federal election. He served on the Joint Standing Committee on Foreign Affairs from 1964 to 1969.

Hughes continued to practise as a barrister during his time as a backbencher. In 1967 he represented Clive Evatt Jr., nephew of former ALP leader Herbert Evatt, against the New South Wales Bar Association in a professional misconduct case. In August 1969, he represented Alexander McLeod-Lindsay at a special inquiry into his conviction for attempting to murder his wife, arguing there had been a mistrial.

=== Attorney-General ===
Hughes was appointed Attorney-General in the second Gorton ministry in a major reshuffle after the 1969 federal election.

In May 1970, Hughes publicly spoke in favour of decriminalising homosexuality, in the context of the drafting of new criminal codes for the Australian Capital Territory and Northern Territory. In the same year he supported Rae Else-Mitchell's call for federal and state courts to be merged into a single judicial system. In 1971, Hughes led the Commonwealth's successful case in Strickland v Rocla Concrete Pipes Ltd, an appeal to the High Court from a Commonwealth Industrial Court decision, which marked a significant expansion of the federal government's corporations power.

Hughes came into conflict with university students on a number of occasions. He was "jostled" by protestors after a speech at the University of Sydney in July 1970 and subsequently abandoned his car, inadvertently causing over 300 police to be called out when the event's organisers could not locate him. At a speech to the Australian National University's Liberal Club in September 1970, he was interrupted by anti-war demonstrators and "grabbed a Vietcong flag from a student and tore it from its supporting pole". The previous month his home in Bellevue Hill had been invaded by anti-war demonstrators, resulting in eight students and two press photographers being arrested. He reportedly "came out carrying a cricket bat and scuffled with some of the demonstrators" before performing a citizen's arrest on one student. Hughes was charged with unlawful assault in relation to his use of the bat, but was found not guilty by reason of provocation.

Hughes supported John Gorton in the 1971 leadership spill and was not retained as attorney-general when William McMahon replaced Gorton as party leader and prime minister. He later spoke of a "feeling of having been wronged" over the demotion. In August 1971 he opposed McMahon's attempts to sack Gorton from the new ministry, describing them as "bordering on the insane". Hughes quickly returned to his legal practice, appearing before the Supreme Court of the Australian Capital Territory a few months after his sacking. He was opposed for Liberal preselection in October 1971 by four other candidates, winning a majority on the first ballot. The Canberra Times reported that his bid for renomination was opposed by the conservative faction led by Jim Cameron, and that since leaving the ministry his comments "had established him as one of the principal spokesmen for the 'radical wing' of the Liberal Party".

In November 1971, Hughes announced his decision to retire from federal politics at the next election, citing a desire to return to practising law full-time.

== Later career ==
In September 1972 Hughes was elected to the council of the Australian National University, to a term expiring in 1975.

After leaving politics he became one of the leading figures at the Sydney bar, and was president of the New South Wales Bar Association between 1973 and 1975. He was formerly engaged in full-time practice as a member of Sydney's Blackstone Chambers, and as of 2016 was the most senior member of the NSW Bar.

In 1974 Hughes defended New South Wales premier Robert Askin against a defamation suit brought by Jack Mundey, the president of the Communist Party of Australia. In 1976 he simultaneously appeared for prime minister Gough Whitlam in the New South Wales Court of Petty Sessions while representing Vic Garland against Whitlam in the Supreme Court of the Australian Capital Territory. The cases were unrelated and as such there was no perceived conflict of interest. Hughes assisted media mogul Kerry Packer at the Costigan Royal Commission in 1984. In the same year he represented bookmaker Bill Waterhouse at the New South Wales Racing Appeals Tribunal following the Fine Cotton scandal.

Hughes represented High Court judge Lionel Murphy in several different venues relating to his alleged attempts to pervert the course of justice. In 1984 he appeared for Murphy before a Senate committee, and the following year he represented Murphy in his appeal against a conviction for conspiracy to pervert the course of justice.

In 2002, The Sydney Morning Herald reported that Hughes was still working full-time at the age of 78, as one of only two active barristers admitted to the New South Wales bar in the 1940s. He retired from the bar in October 2013, a month before his 90th birthday.

Hughes delivered the eulogy at the state memorial service for John Gorton in May 2002. His speech was highly critical of Malcolm Fraser's actions in 1971, which he termed a "political assassination". Fraser was in attendance at the service.

== Personal life ==
In 1951 Hughes married Joanna Fitzgerald, a niece of the poet R. D. Fitzgerald. The couple had three children together – Lucy, Tom Jr. and Michael. Lucy served as Lord Mayor of Sydney (2000–2002), and married Malcolm Turnbull, who became prime minister of Australia (2015–2018). Tom followed his father into the legal profession, often serving as his junior. Michael became a stockbroker and business executive, also holding senior office in the Liberal Party's organisational wing.

Hughes and his wife divorced in 1972. He proposed marriage subsequently to the actress Kate Fitzpatrick, who turned him down. In 1981 he married, secondly, Chrissie Abel Smith (née Taylor), at a ceremony officiated by Ted Noffs.

Hughes was raised Catholic. He left the church for a period due to disagreements with its social policies, but rejoined in the early 1990s.

In the early 1970s Hughes bought an 800-hectare (2,000-acre) farming property at Gurrundah, New South Wales. He initially raised cattle but in 1976 established a Poll Dorset sheep stud with six rams and 320 ewes. He won prizes at local agricultural shows and exhibited at the Sydney Royal Easter Show.

Hughes died on 28 November 2024, at the age of 101.

== Honours ==
Officer of the Order of Australia (AO)	1988 for services to the legal profession
1939–45 Star	
France and Germany Star	
War Medal 1939–1945	
Australia Service Medal 1939–45	
Centenary Medal	2001
Chevalier of the Legion of Honour	(France) 2005

Political offices
Preceded by Nigel Bowen	Attorney-General; 1969–1971	Succeeded by Nigel Bowen
Parliament of Australia
Preceded by Les Haylen	Member for Parkes; 1963–1969	Succeeded by Abolished
Preceded by New division	Member for Berowra; 1969–1972	Succeeded by Harry Edwards
