= Allan MacDonald (Western Australian politician) =

Australian politician

The Honourable Allan MacDonald
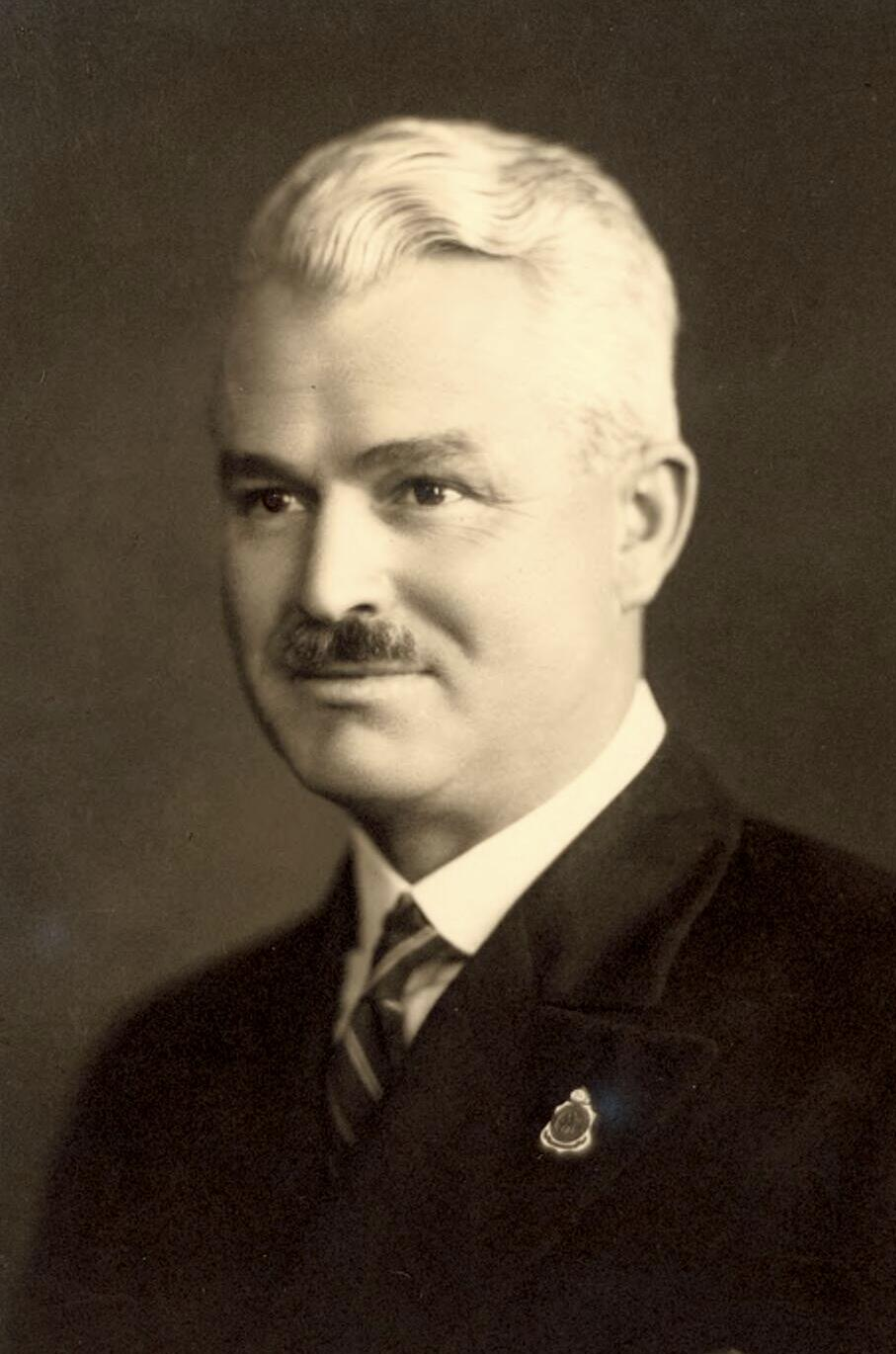

Senator for Western Australia
- In office 5 March 1935 – 30 June 1947

Personal details
- Born: 25 August 1892 Lochee, Scotland
- Died: 18 January 1978 (aged 85) Nedlands, Western Australia
- Party: UAP (until 1945); Liberal (from 1945)
- Spouse: Christiana Hildreth (m. 1916)
- Occupation: Soldier; Accountant

Allan Nicoll MacDonald (25 August 1892 – 18 January 1978) was an Australian politician who served as a Senator for Western Australia from 1935 to 1947. He served as a minister without portfolio in the Lyons and Page governments.

== Early life ==
MacDonald was born on 25 August 1892 in Lochee, Forfarshire, Scotland. He was the son of Helen Christie (née Nicoll) and Alexander MacDonald. His father had been manager of a jute mill near Naihati, India, before retiring to Scotland.

MacDonald was educated at Arbroath High School. He immigrated to Australia in 1911, initially settling in Collie, Western Australia, where he worked in a bakery and as a labourer. He moved to Perth in 1914 and took evening classes in accounting and commerce at the Perth Technical School while working for Rankin, Morrison & Co., an accounting firm.

During World War I, MacDonald enlisted in the Australian Imperial Force two days after its formation. He joined the 8th Battery, Australian Field Artillery, and served on the Gallipoli campaign until being evacuated due to ill health. MacDonald spent seven months recuperating in England, before joining the Australian Army Pay Corps in Egypt where he was a warrant officer. He was discharged from the AIF at his own request in 1919 to joined the American Red Cross in Palestine. He worked for the Red Cross from June to October 1919 and also spent periods in Armenia, Mesopotamia, Syria and Turkey.

MacDonald resumed work with his previous employer Rankin, Morrison & Co. after returning to Australia in 1920. He was appointed secretary of the Western Australian Consultative Council in 1925, a fundraising body that facilitated business donations to the anti-Labor parties. He was also active in the Returned Sailors and Soldiers Imperial League of Australia and developed "a pronounced Australian accent" despite his Scottish origin.

== Politics ==
MacDonald's political involvement began with the National Party of Western Australia, initially in organisational roles with the National Political Organization. He was the state campaign director at the 1927 state election and 1931 federal election, and served as the party's general secretary from 1930 to 1935.

At the 1934 federal election, MacDonald was elected to a six-year Senate term beginning on 1 July 1935, running on the United Australia Party ticket. He instead began his term on 5 March 1935, after being appointed to fill the casual vacancy caused by the death of retiring senator Walter Kingsmill. MacDonald was re-elected to a second term at the 1940 election. He joined the new Liberal Party in 1945 but lost his seat at the 1946 election, with his term concluding on 30 June 1947.

On 29 November 1937, MacDonald was appointed as a minister without portfolio in the Lyons government, maintaining Western Australian representation in the cabinet following the defeat of external affairs minister George Pearce at the 1937 election. He was minister assisting the Minister for Commerce until November 1938 and then minister assisting the Treasurer until April 1939, when Lyons' successor Robert Menzies chose not to retain him in the new ministry. After the end of his ministerial career he served on the Standing Committee on Regulations and Ordinances from 1939 to 1947 and on the Joint Standing Committee on Broadcasting from 1943 to 1944.

MacDonald supported the Lyons government's National Insurance scheme and "was persistent on behalf of the disadvantaged, and relatively generous on social issues, especially pensions, compensation, housing and, specifically, conditions of work for nurses and seamen". In December 1939 he crossed the floor with his Western Australian colleague Bertie Johnston to vote against the Menzies government's gold tax bill, which may have prejudiced his chances of regaining a cabinet post. MacDonald spoke regularly on defence matters in the Senate and in 1937 advocated the resumption of universal training, a form of conscription. He supported the formation of a national unity government during World War II and visited England and Canada in 1943 as part of an Empire Parliamentary Association delegation.

MacDonald had several health problems while in parliament. In 1941, he missed the balloting for president of the Senate due to gallstones, allowing Australian Labor Party candidate James Cunningham to defeat the government candidate John Hayes. In the same year he was granted several months of absence while hospitalised for ulcers. He experienced further bouts of illness in 1943 and 1945.

== Personal life ==
In 1916, MacDonald married Christiana Hildreth, a Women's Legion driver whom he met while recuperating in London. The couple had three sons and two daughters.

MacDonald lived in Canberra while in parliament but returned to Perth after his defeat. He was active in real estate and was appointed to the Lotteries Commission of Western Australia in 1948, serving as chairman from 1961 to 1965.

MacDonald retired to his home in Mount Lawley, Western Australia. He died on 18 January 1978 at the Repatriation General Hospital, Hollywood, aged 85.
