= Joseph Martin (Australian politician) =

Australian politician

Joseph Michael Martin (3 January 1898 – 5 March 1940) was an Australian politician.

Martin was born at Pyrmont in Sydney to engineer John Martin and Maria Theresa, née McArdle. He married Minnie Louise Fuller on 20 September 1919, with whom he had two children. Long involved in the trade union movement, Martin was an organiser of the Electrical Trades Union in 1931 and a member of the Milk Board from 1931 to 1938. In 1931 he was appointed to the New South Wales Legislative Council as a Labor member, serving until 1934. Martin died at Newcastle in 1940.
