= Charles Marr =

Australian politician (1880–1960)

The Honourable Sir Charles Marr KCVO DSO MC
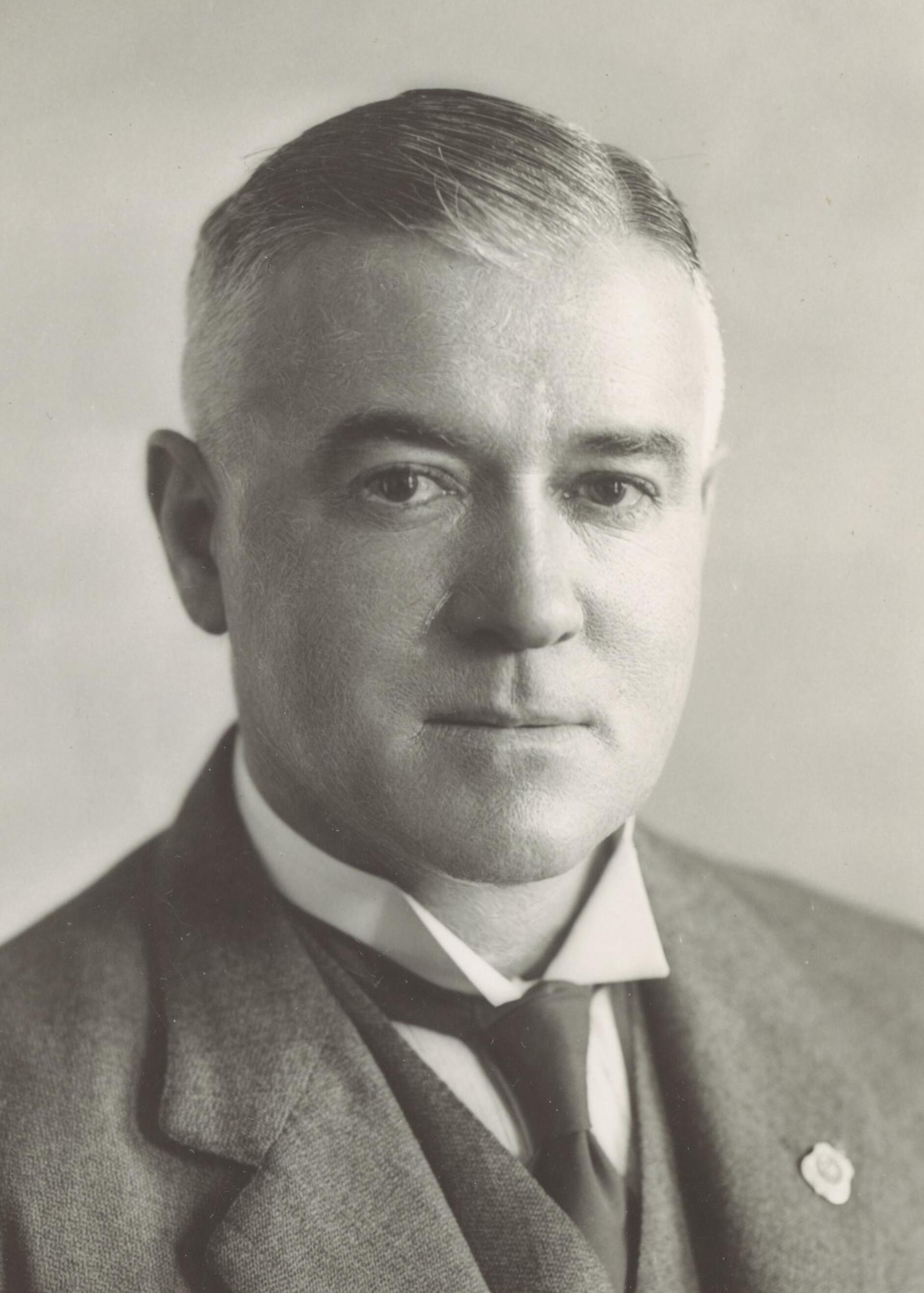

Minister for Repatriation
- In office 12 April 1932 – 12 October 1934
- Prime Minister: Joseph Lyons
- Preceded by: Charles Hawker
- Succeeded by: Billy Hughes

Minister for Health
- In office 6 January 1932 – 12 October 1934
- Prime Minister: Joseph Lyons
- Preceded by: John McNeill
- Succeeded by: Billy Hughes

Minister for Works and Railways
- In office 6 January 1932 – 12 April 1932
- Prime Minister: Joseph Lyons
- Preceded by: Albert Green
- Succeeded by: Abolished

Minister for Home and Territories
- In office 2 April 1927 – 24 February 1928
- Prime Minister: Stanley Bruce
- Preceded by: William Glasgow
- Succeeded by: Neville Howse

Member of the Australian Parliament for Parkes
- In office 31 January 1931 – 21 August 1943
- Preceded by: Edward McTiernan
- Succeeded by: Les Haylen
- In office 13 December 1919 – 12 October 1929
- Preceded by: Bruce Smith
- Succeeded by: Edward McTiernan

Personal details
- Born: 23 March 1880 Petersham, New South Wales, Australia
- Died: 20 October 1960 (aged 80) Pymble, New South Wales, Australia
- Party: Nationalist (to 1931); UAP (from 1931)
- Spouse: Ethel May Ritchie
- Education: Newington College; Sydney Technical College
- Occupation: Electrical engineer

Military service
- Allegiance: Australia
- Branch/service: Australian Army
- Years of service: 1898–c.1920s
- Rank: Major
- Battles/wars: First World War: Mesopotamian campaign
- Awards: Knight Commander of the Royal Victorian Order; Distinguished Service Order; Military Cross; Mentioned in Despatches (2)

Sir Charles William Clanan Marr KCVO, DSO, MC (23 March 1880 – 20 October 1960) was an Australian politician, engineer and soldier. He was a member of cabinet under prime ministers Stanley Bruce and Joseph Lyons, serving as Minister for Home and Territories (1927–1928), Works and Railways (1932), Health (1932–1934), and Repatriation (1932–1934). He was a member of the House of Representatives for over 20 years, representing the New South Wales seat of Parkes (1919–1929, 1931–1943). Prior to entering politics he was an officer with the Australian Imperial Force during World War I, winning the Distinguished Service Order and Military Cross for his service on the Mesopotamian campaign.

== Early life and military career ==
Marr was born on 23 March 1880 in Petersham, New South Wales, the son of Ellen (née Nilson) and James Clanan Marr. His mother was born in Ireland and his father, a bootmaker, was born in Hobart. Marr was educated at Fort Street Model School, Newington College (1895) and Sydney Technical College, graduating as an electrical engineer. He joined the state Postmaster-General's Department and transferred to the federal Postmaster-General's Department in 1901. He married Ethel May Ritchie in September 1905. He took an early interest in radio broadcasting and developed this interest while in military service with the first Australian Imperial Force during World War I in Mesopotamia. He received a Military Cross in 1917 and a Distinguished Service Order in 1918.

== Political career ==
Marr commenced his political career by winning the Nationalist Party endorsement for the seat of Parkes from the incumbent Bruce Smith, and easily won the seat in the 1919 general election.

In October 1927, he urged the Australian parliament not to highlight the past mistreatment of indigenous Australians, in order to preserve the White Australia policy:

To review the past (...) would be to unjustly misrepresent the conditions that obtain today. If we were to broadcast to the world that nearly 100 years ago the aborigines were treated in a dastardly way-and admittedly they were-we should do injury to our White Australia policy; whereas we wish to convince the world that we are as mindful of our black brethren as of the whites.

In 1929, as an honorary minister in the Bruce–Page government, Marr was sent to represent Australia at the League of Nations. On the journey to Europe he developed a friendship with Amanullah Khan, the recently deposed king of Afghanistan; they conversed in French. He subsequently gave an account of their meetings to an Australian correspondent.

Marr lost the seat of Parkes to Edward McTiernan at the 1929 federal election. However, he regained Parkes at a 1931 by-election when McTiernan resigned to join the High Court of Australia and held the seat until 1943, initially as a Nationalist and later as a member of the United Australia Party. Marr held a number of cabinet posts in the Bruce and Lyons governments, including Home and Territories, Works and Railways, Health and Repatriation.

== Personal life ==
Marr died in the Sydney suburb of Pymble, survived by his wife, two sons and two daughters. He was made a Knight Commander of the Royal Victorian Order in 1934 for his role in organising the Australian tour of the Duke of Gloucester.

== Notes ==
Political offices
Preceded by William Glasgow	Minister for Home and Territories; 1927–28	Succeeded by Neville Howse
Preceded by Albert Green	Minister for Works and Railways; 1932	Title abolished
New title	Minister in charge of Territories; 1932	Succeeded by Harry Lawson
Preceded by John McNeill	Minister for Health; 1932–34	Succeeded by Billy Hughes
Preceded by Charles Hawker	Minister for Repatriation; 1932–34	Succeeded by Billy Hughes
Parliament of Australia
Preceded by Bruce Smith	Member for Parkes; 1919–29	Succeeded by Edward McTiernan
Preceded by Edward McTiernan	Member for Parkes; 1931–43	Succeeded by Les Haylen
