= Division of Parkes (1901–1969) =

Former Australian federal electoral division

Parkes Australian House of Representatives Division
- Created: 1901
- Abolished: 1969
- Namesake: Henry Parkes

The Division of Parkes was an Australian Electoral Division in the state of New South Wales. It was located in the south-west of Sydney, and originally included the suburbs of Canterbury, Burwood and Ashfield. By the time it was abolished in 1969, it had been redistributed to cover suburbs such as Earlwood and Harcourt.

The division was proclaimed in 1900, and was one of the original 75 divisions to be contested at the first Federal election. It was named after Sir Henry Parkes, seventh Premier of New South Wales and sometimes known as the 'Father of Federation'. The seat was vacant for a short time at the end of 1930, when Edward McTiernan was appointed a Justice of the High Court of Australia. He was to become the longest serving Justice of that court.

At the redistribution of 11 October 1984, a new Division of Parkes was created. However, this was located in north-west rural New South Wales, and had no connection to this division.

== Members ==
| Image | Member | Party | Term | Notes |
|---|---|---|---|---|
| | Bruce Smith (1851–1937) | Free Trade | 29 March 1901 – 1906 | Previously held the New South Wales Legislative Assembly seat of Glebe. Lost preselection and then lost seat |
| | Bruce Smith (1851–1937) | Anti-Socialist | 1906 – 26 May 1909 | Previously held the New South Wales Legislative Assembly seat of Glebe. Lost preselection and then lost seat |
| | Bruce Smith (1851–1937) | Liberal | 26 May 1909 – 17 February 1917 | Previously held the New South Wales Legislative Assembly seat of Glebe. Lost preselection and then lost seat |
| | Bruce Smith (1851–1937) | Nationalist | 17 February 1917 – 1919 | Previously held the New South Wales Legislative Assembly seat of Glebe. Lost preselection and then lost seat |
| | Bruce Smith (1851–1937) | Independent | 1919 – 13 December 1919 | Previously held the New South Wales Legislative Assembly seat of Glebe. Lost preselection and then lost seat |
| | Charles Marr (1880–1960) | Nationalist | 13 December 1919 – 12 October 1929 | Served as Chief Government Whip in the House under Bruce. Served as minister under Bruce. Lost seat |
| | Edward McTiernan (1892–1990) | Labor | 12 October 1929 – 19 December 1930 | Previously held the New South Wales Legislative Assembly seat of Western Suburbs. Resigned to become a Justice of the High Court |
| | Sir Charles Marr (1880–1960) | Nationalist | 31 January 1931 – 7 May 1931 | Served as minister under Lyons. Lost seat |
| | Sir Charles Marr (1880–1960) | United Australia | 7 May 1931 – 21 August 1943 | Served as minister under Lyons. Lost seat |
| | Les Haylen (1898–1977) | Labor | 21 August 1943 – 30 November 1963 | Lost seat |
| | Tom Hughes (1923–2024) | Liberal | 30 November 1963 – 25 October 1969 | Transferred to the Division of Berowra after Parkes was abolished in 1969 |
